= Jeep Grand Wagoneer =

Jeep Grand Wagoneer may refer to:

- a variant of the Jeep Wagoneer (SJ), produced from 1984 to 1991
- a variant of the Jeep Grand Cherokee (ZJ), produced from 1992 to 1993
- Jeep Grand Wagoneer (WS), an SUV made by Jeep from 2021 onwards

== See also ==
- Jeep Wagoneer
