= Dodge Charger =

Series of automobiles marketed by Dodge

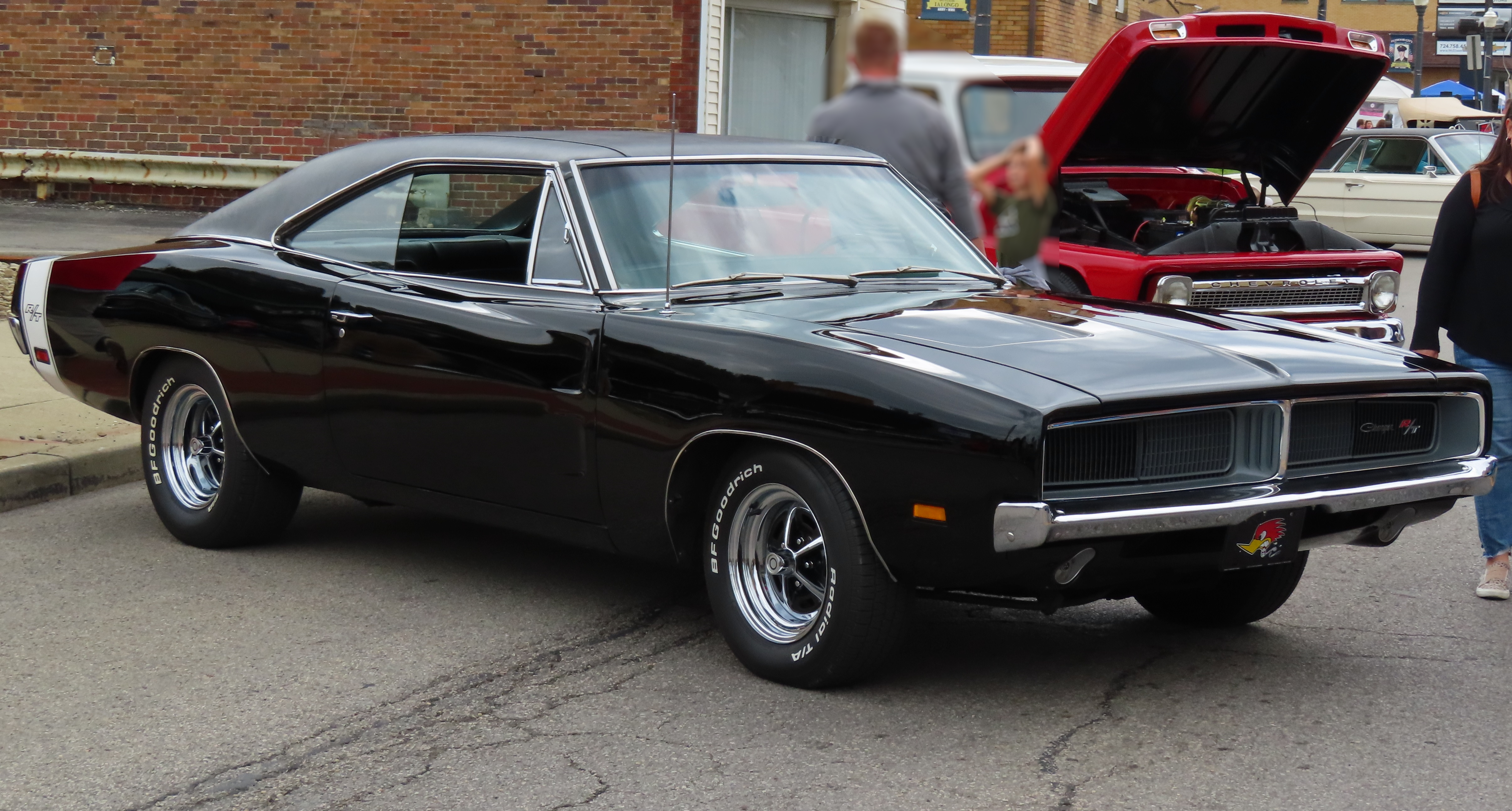
- 1969 Dodge Charger R/T

Overview
- Manufacturer: Dodge
- Production: 1966–1978; 1981–1987; 2005–present
- Model years: 1966–1978; 1982–1987; 2006–present

The Dodge Charger is a model of automobile marketed by Dodge in various forms over eight generations since 1966.

The first Charger was a show car in 1964. The Charger nameplate was applied to a special trim version of the 1965 Dodge Dart compact with 273 cu in (4.5 L) V8 engines. A 1965 Charger II concept car resembled the 1966 production version.

In the United States, the Charger nameplate has been used on mid-size cars, personal luxury coupes, subcompact hatchbacks, and full-size sedans.

== Background ==
The 1966 Charger was an effort by Dodge to produce an upscale, upsized pony car. American Motors Corporation (AMC) had already introduced a very similar vehicle in 1965, the Rambler Marlin, which was positioned as a personal car, an emerging market niche.

Demand for larger specialty cars was rapidly increasing. Mercury was successful in its execution when it introduced the upscale Cougar, a larger and more refined version of the Ford Mustang that pioneered the pony car concept when it was introduced in 1964. General Motors was fielding specialty models across all its nameplates.

The first generation Charger included high-trim and comfort features, positioned as a luxurious fastback hardtop. It was aimed at the segment that included the Oldsmobile Toronado and Ford Thunderbird rather than as a muscle car.

== First generation: 1966–1967 ==
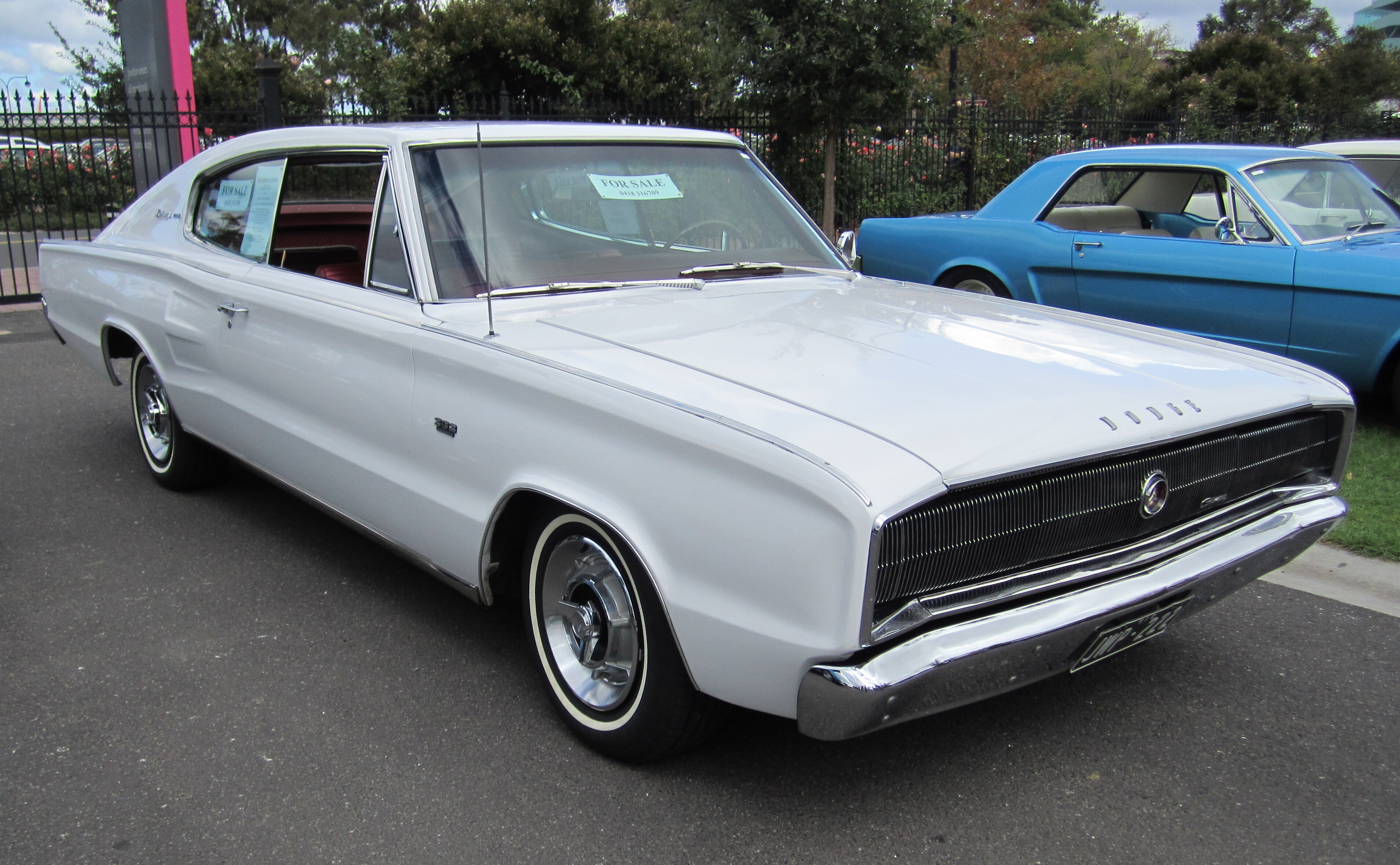
1966 Charger

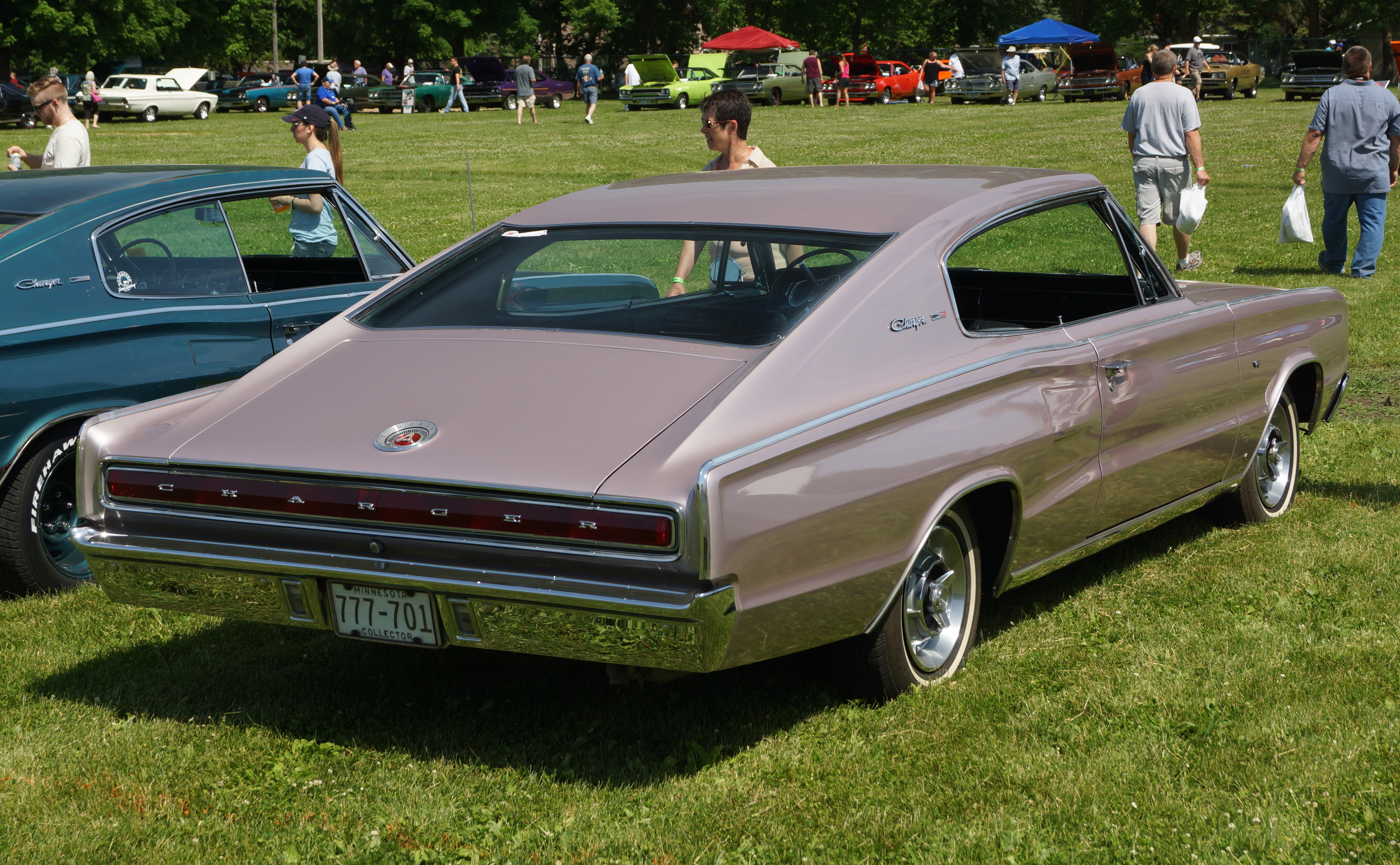
1966 Charger

The Charger was introduced in the mid-1966 model year. Derived from the Chrysler B-body intermediate-sized Dodge Coronet, it shared major components like the chassis and much of the two-door Coronet's front body with a fastback roofline following the pattern set by AMC's 1965 Marlin. Similar to the positioning of the Marlin, the Charger was a more substantial car focused on more mature buyers because "Pony cars, the implication ran, were for kids."

The fastback styling was popular with Corvette and Mustang buyers. The Charger's interior featured four bucket seats with a center console that went to the back seats and had "race-inspired" instrument gauges. The front fascia introduced hidden headlights behind a full-width grille and a "wall-to-wall" taillamp design. The base engine was a 318 cu in (5.2 L) V8 with a three-speed manual transmission, while automatic and floor-mounted manual transmissions were optional. Larger and more powerful engines were available up to the 426 cu in (7.0 L) Hemi V8.

Positioned as a sporty luxury model, the first generation Chargers saw low interest among buyers. The cars' front and rear overhang made the fastback design look tall, especially given its relatively narrow track dimensions (the distance between the centreline of two wheels on the same axle). Adapting a pony car-sized fastback roofline to intermediate-sized cars was not attractive, "with pundits pointing to the similar fate of AMC's Marlin to support the theory." A total of 37,344 Chargers were sold the first year and only 15,788 for the 1967 model year.

== Second generation: 1968–1970 ==
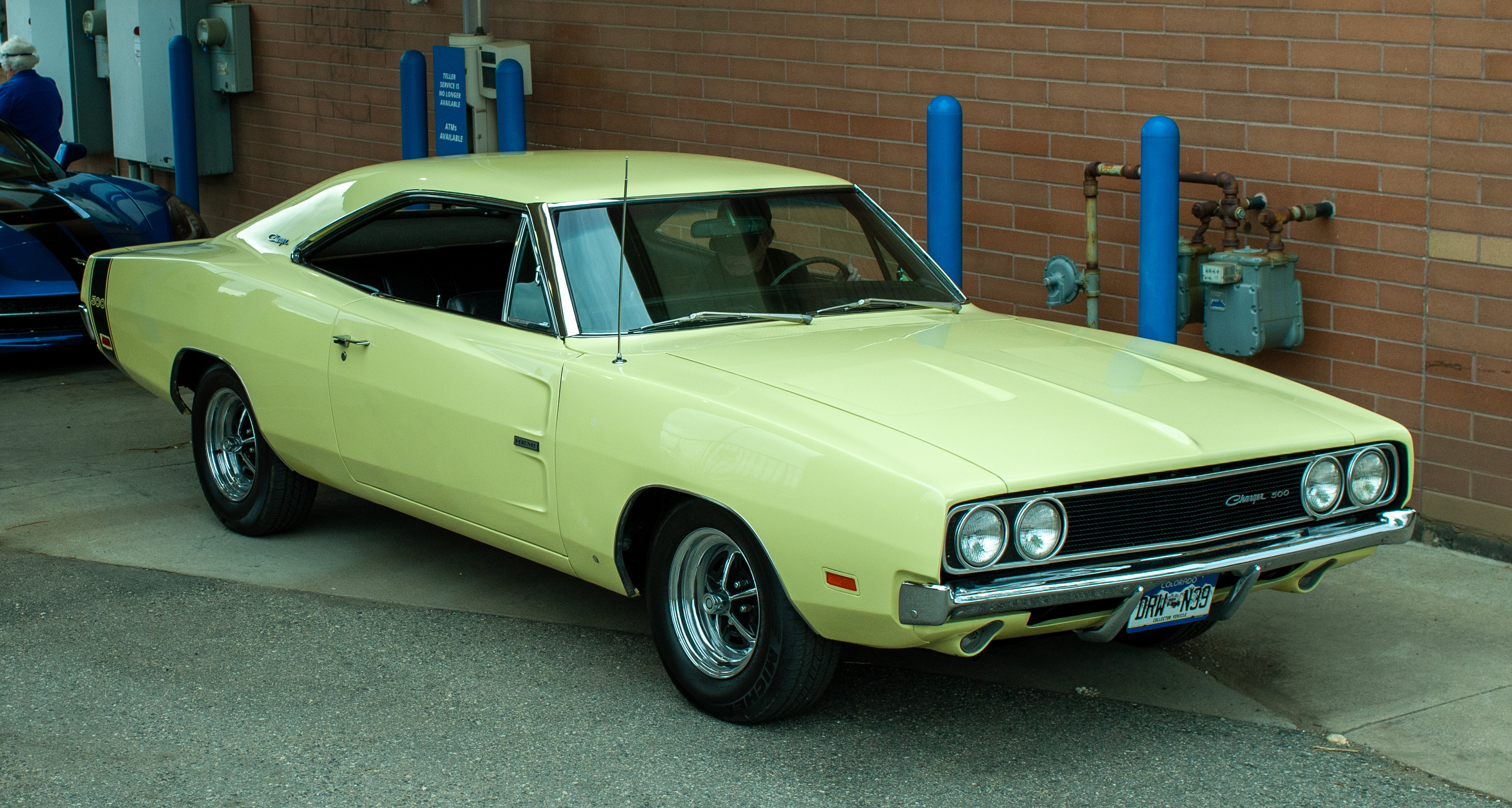
1969 Charger 500 Hemi

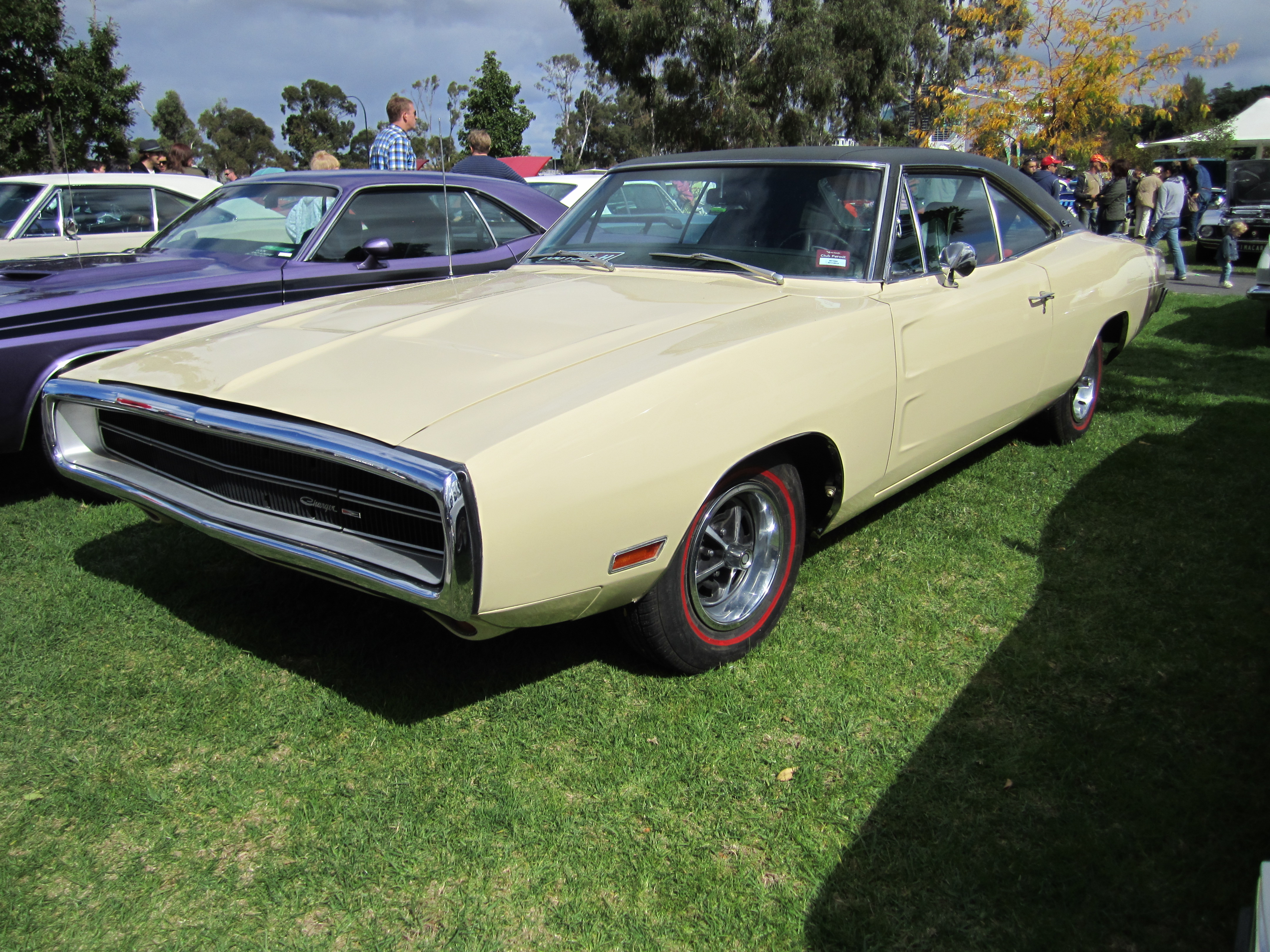
1970 Charger

The Charger was redesigned for 1968 with a "less daring" body, a six-cylinder engine, simplified interior layout, and a conventional trunk. Dodge planned 35,000 units for production, but demand was high, and 96,100 Chargers were built.

Based on the Chrysler B platform, the 1968 through 1970 model years had cosmetic changes to the exterior and interior. These included going from twin round tail lights to broad horizontal units and adding a horizontal trim to the grille. The powertrains were carried over from 1967, with the 225 cu in (3.7 L) slant-6 available in mid-1968.

The 1968 Charger was unsuccessful in stock car racing, such as NASCAR. A more aerodynamic shape formed the Charger 500 model, later followed by the 1969 Charger Daytona. The 1970 Charger won the most NASCAR races that year, helping Bobby Isaac claim the championship.

The Dukes of Hazzard television series made the second-generation Dodge Chargers familiar to the American public.

== Third generation: 1971–1974 ==
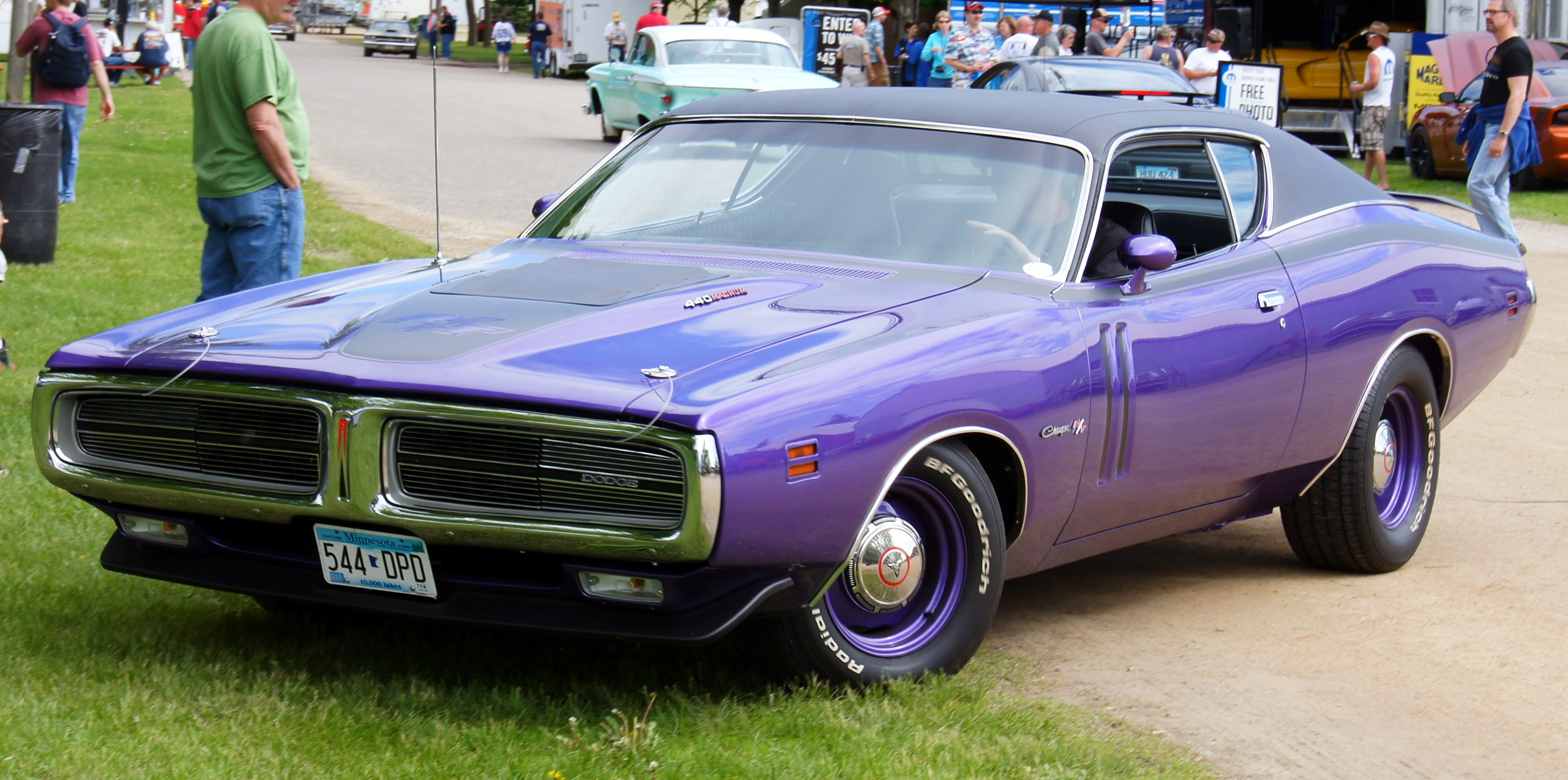
1971 Charger R/T

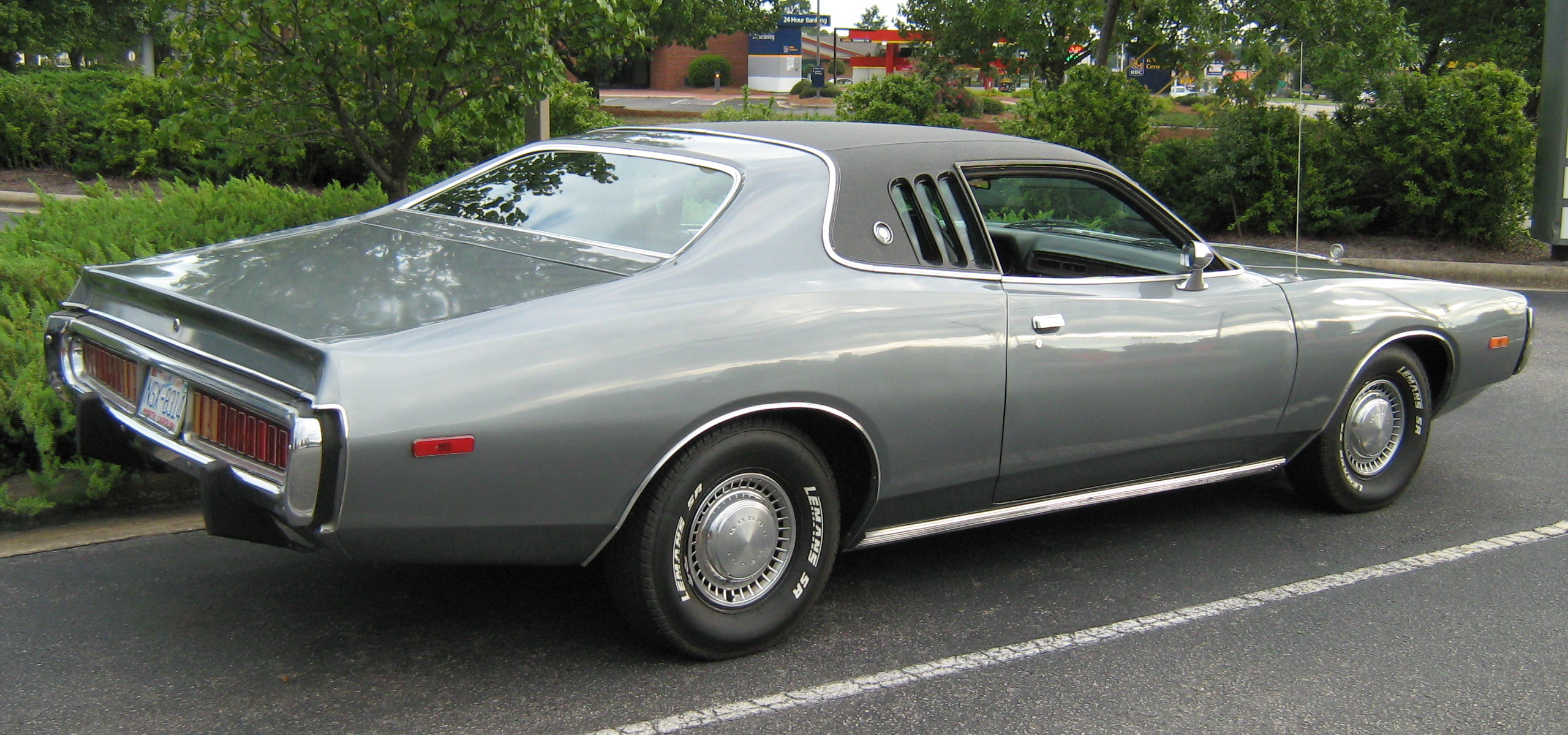
1973 Charger

The third generation Charger was introduced for the 1971 model year. Chrysler's B platform was modified to meet new emissions and safety regulations. Available in six different packages with cosmetic changes, including a split grille, semi-fastback rear window, and a ducktail spoiler.

The 1973 and 1974 Chargers were similar to the 1971s, with minor differences in the grille and headlamps. The 1973 and 1974 Chargers also featured new quarter windows, which were larger and shaped differently than those on the 1971 and 1972 models.

The increase in sales was primarily due to the elimination of the Dodge Coronet two-door, which meant Dodge offered the two-door intermediate-size body style only as the Charger (although the Coronet two-door would reappear in 1975).

The name Charger was also used in Brazil as a performance model based on the Dart (A-Body) (1971–1980).

== Fourth generation: 1975–1978 ==
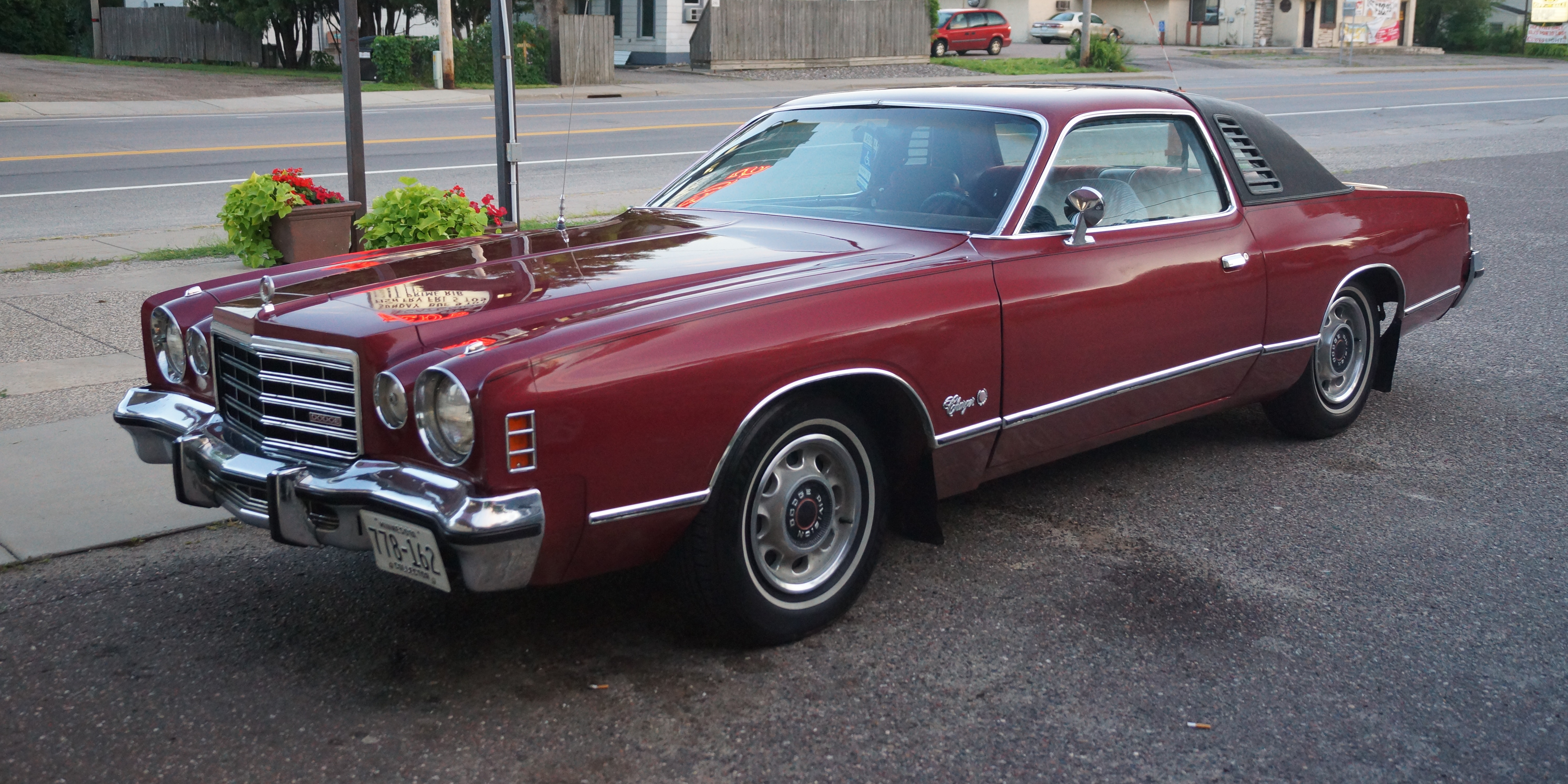
1975 Charger

The 1975 model year Charger continued as a B-body car and was restyled in an effort by Dodge to move the model into the growing personal luxury car market segment. It shared a body with the new Chrysler Cordoba.

For 1976, the former Coronet coupes were rebranded Charger and Charger Sport. A Daytona model was added featuring stripes that ran along the length of the car.

In 1978, Dodge added the Magnum to that segment.

== Fifth generation: 1981–1987 ==
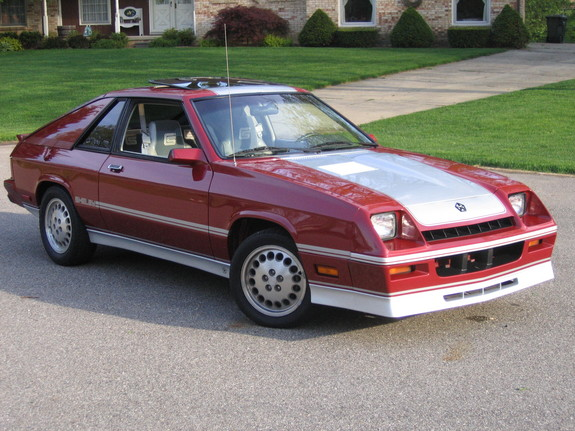
1987 Charger "Shelby Edition"

The Charger returned in 1981 as a front-wheel drive subcompact hatchback coupe with a five-speed manual or a three-speed automatic transmission. This economy-type model was similar to the Dodge Omni 024, but slightly larger. The Charger was available with a normally aspirated 2.2 L SOHC engine or a turbocharged version. Unlike in the Dodge Daytona, the turbo was available only with the manual transmission.

A Shelby Charger was marketed starting in 1983, with a turbo version available in 1984, rated at 142 hp (106 kW; 144 PS) at 5600 rpm and 160 lb⋅ft (217 N⋅m) of torque at 3200 rpm. The engine was not intercooled and used a small t3 Garrett turbo. In 1985, the electronics were updated, allowing for an increase in boost pressure. As a result, output was increased by 4-horsepower (3 kW; 4 PS). In 1987, the intercooler-equipped 2.2L Turbo II engine was included with the Shelby-built Charger GLHS. These were the last 1,000 L-body Chargers built, with power increased to 175 hp (130 kW; 177 PS) and 175 lb⋅ft (237 N⋅m) of torque with the intercooler as well as a two-piece intake manifold, larger injectors and throttle body, as well as a Shelby-tuned ECM.

== Sixth generation: 2006–2010 (LX) ==
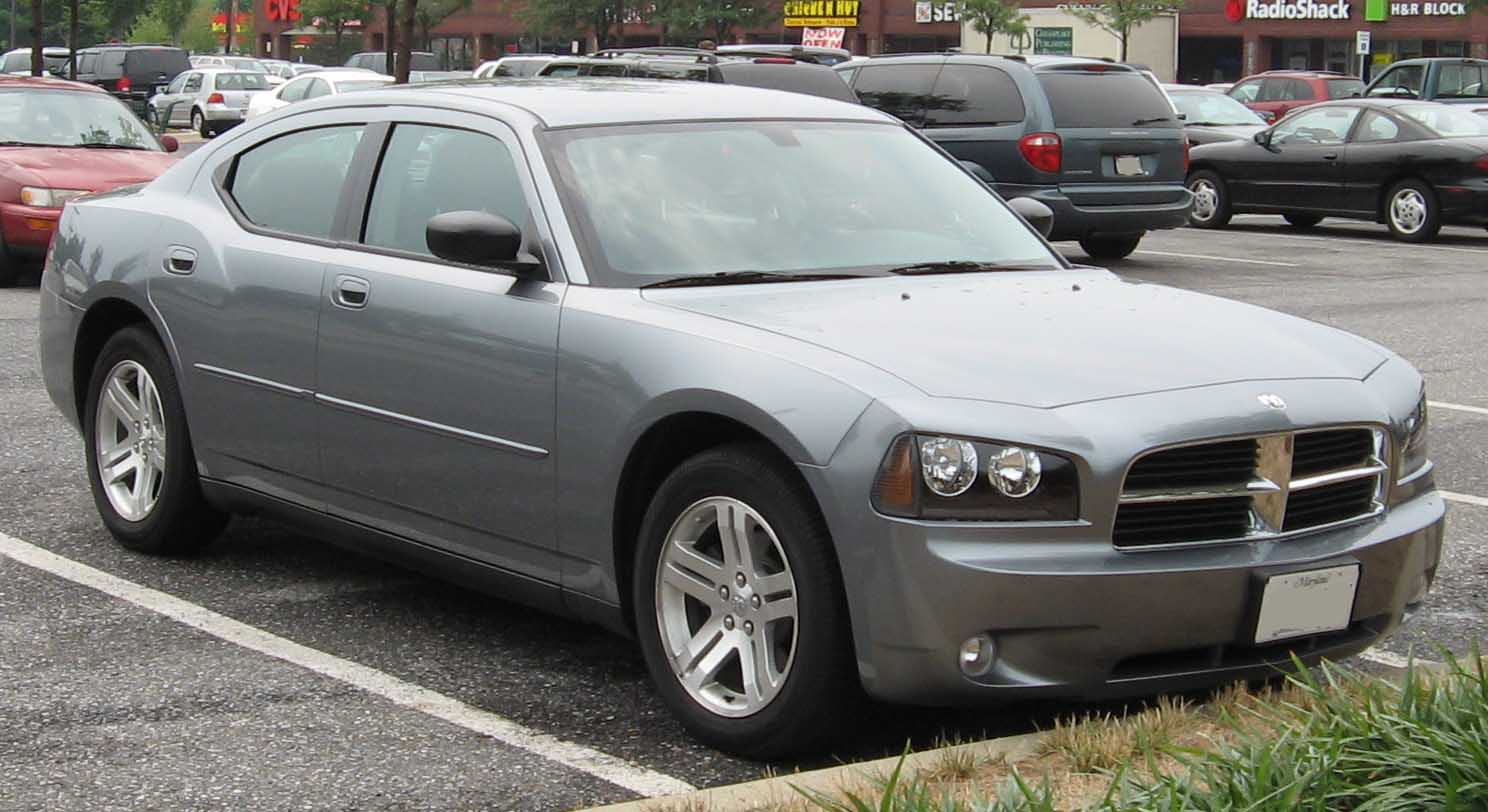
2006–2007 Charger

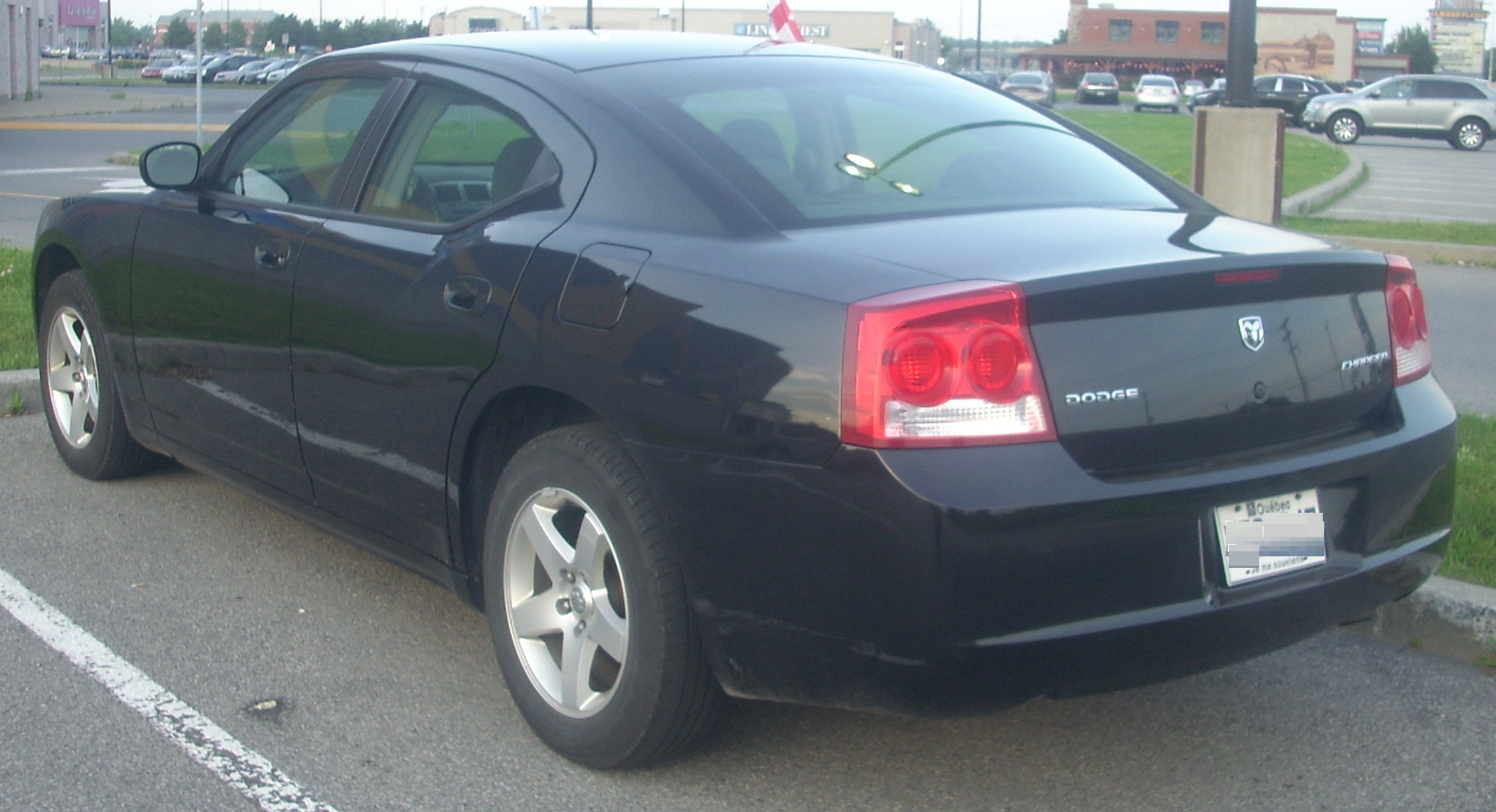
2009–2010 Charger

After a twenty-year absence, Dodge reintroduced the Charger in 2005 for the 2006 model year as a Chrysler LX platform-based four-door sedan. Although the 1999 Charger concept car featured four doors, it shared little else with the 2006 production model.

Initially, the Charger was available in SE, SXT, R/T, R/T with Road/Track Performance Group, Police, and Daytona R/T versions. A V6 engine was available for the first time, as was all-wheel drive (AWD). All-wheel drive was first only available on the R/T package. However, from 2009 onwards, all-wheel drive was also an option for the SE and SXT versions.

The basic SE model included a 2.7 L V6 engine and a four-speed automatic transmission. The 3.5 L V6 included an "AutoStick" manual shifting feature, 17-inch wheels, air conditioning, all-speed traction control, as well as ABS and electronic stability control, a CD player, tilt and telescoping steering column, power locks/mirrors/windows, and remote keyless entry. Additional features and trims were available, including the Charger R/T with a 5.7 L Hemi V8 mated to a five-speed automatic transmission. A multiple-displacement system that allowed it to save fuel by running on only four cylinders when cruising was also featured in the V8.

Performance was the focus of the Charger SRT8 equipped with a 6.1 L Hemi engine mated to a five-speed automatic, as well as conveniences such as an eight-way power front passenger seat, automatic climate control, unique grille and rear spoiler, body-colour interior trim, special front fascia and engine cover, larger exhaust tips, performance steering gear, heated front seats with perforated suede inserts, power-adjustable pedals, and unique colours and exterior trim. An optional Road/Track package offered ten additional horsepower, a GPS navigation system, a 322-watt audio system, a sunroof, and a rear-seat DVD entertainment system and radio.

== Seventh generation: 2011–2023 (LD) ==
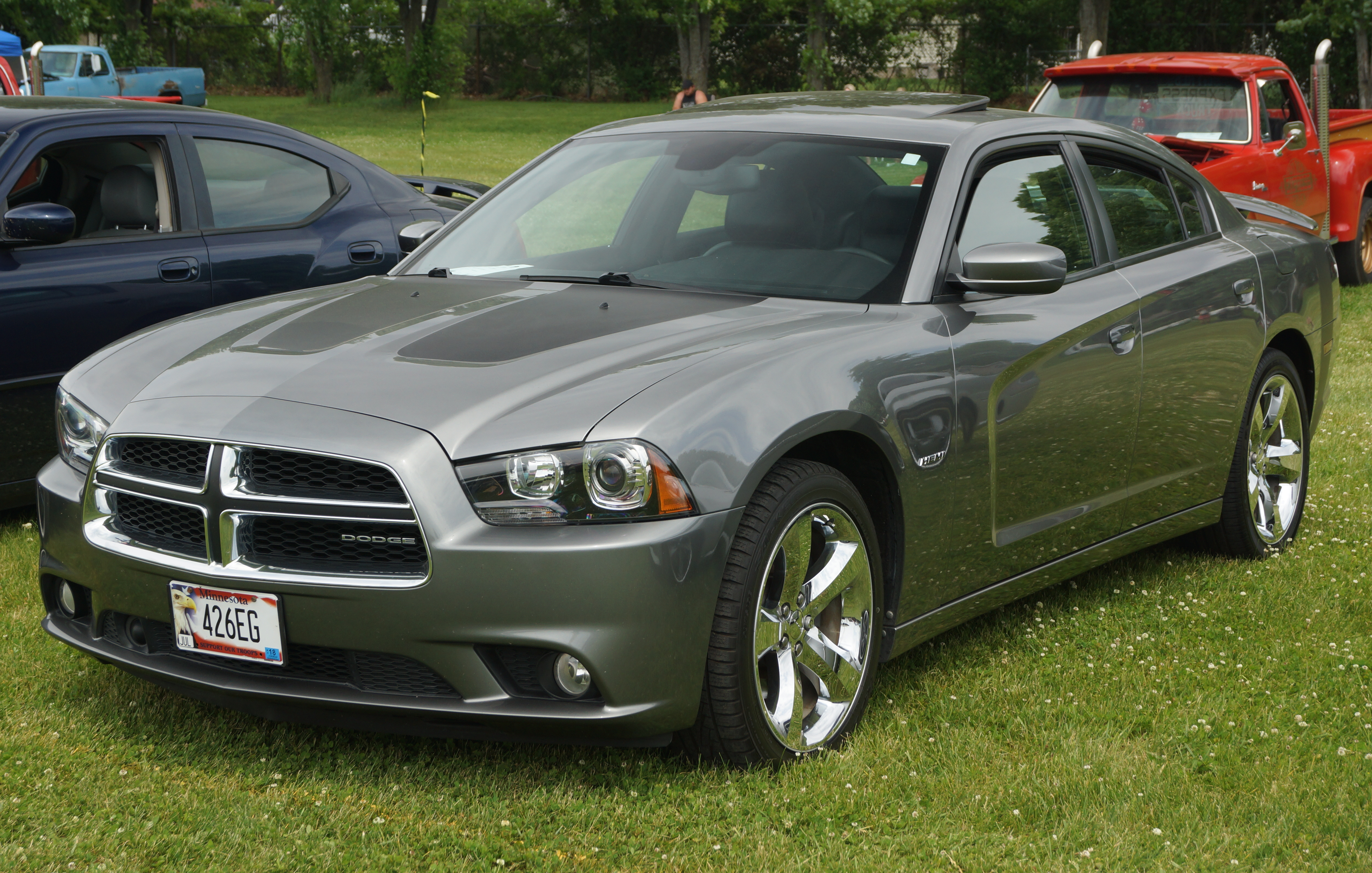
2011 Charger

The Charger received an improved interior and new exterior styling for 2011. This included new side scoops along both front and rear doors, more angular headlights, aggressive new grille styling, and a more defined and aerodynamic shape overall. Most notably, the back end adopted a more modern wrap-around LED tail light spanning nearly the entire trunk width. Driver visibility was improved by more than 15%, addressing complaints from previous years. The side and rear styling cues are reminiscent of the 1968 through 1970 models.

Base performance was increased, with the 3.5 L 250 hp (186 kW; 253 PS) V6 engine replaced with a Pentastar 3.6 L producing 292 hp (218 kW; 296 PS) at 6350 rpm and 260 lb⋅ft (350 N⋅m) of torque at 4800 rpm. The 4-speed automatic transmission was replaced with the five-speed A580 auto.

The SRT8 was not produced for the 2011 model year.

The 2012 year featured a new eight-speed automatic transmission to the V6 model. The SRT8 returned to the model lineup. AWD was also added to the V6, making AWD available on all but the SRT8 model.

For the 2012 through 2018 model years, the Super Bee platform (later called Scat Pack 15+) was available, using features seen in regular SRT8 models with accessories and badges reminiscent of the 1960s and 1970s muscle car. These included a 6.4 L engine rated at 470 hp (350 kW; 477 PS) and had four-piston Brembo calipers, slotted rotors, paddle shifters, SRT launch features - such as 0-60 timing, Live G-Force readings, and 1/4 mi (0.40 km) and 1/8 mi (0.20 km) drag timers, custom seat embroidery, and other features.

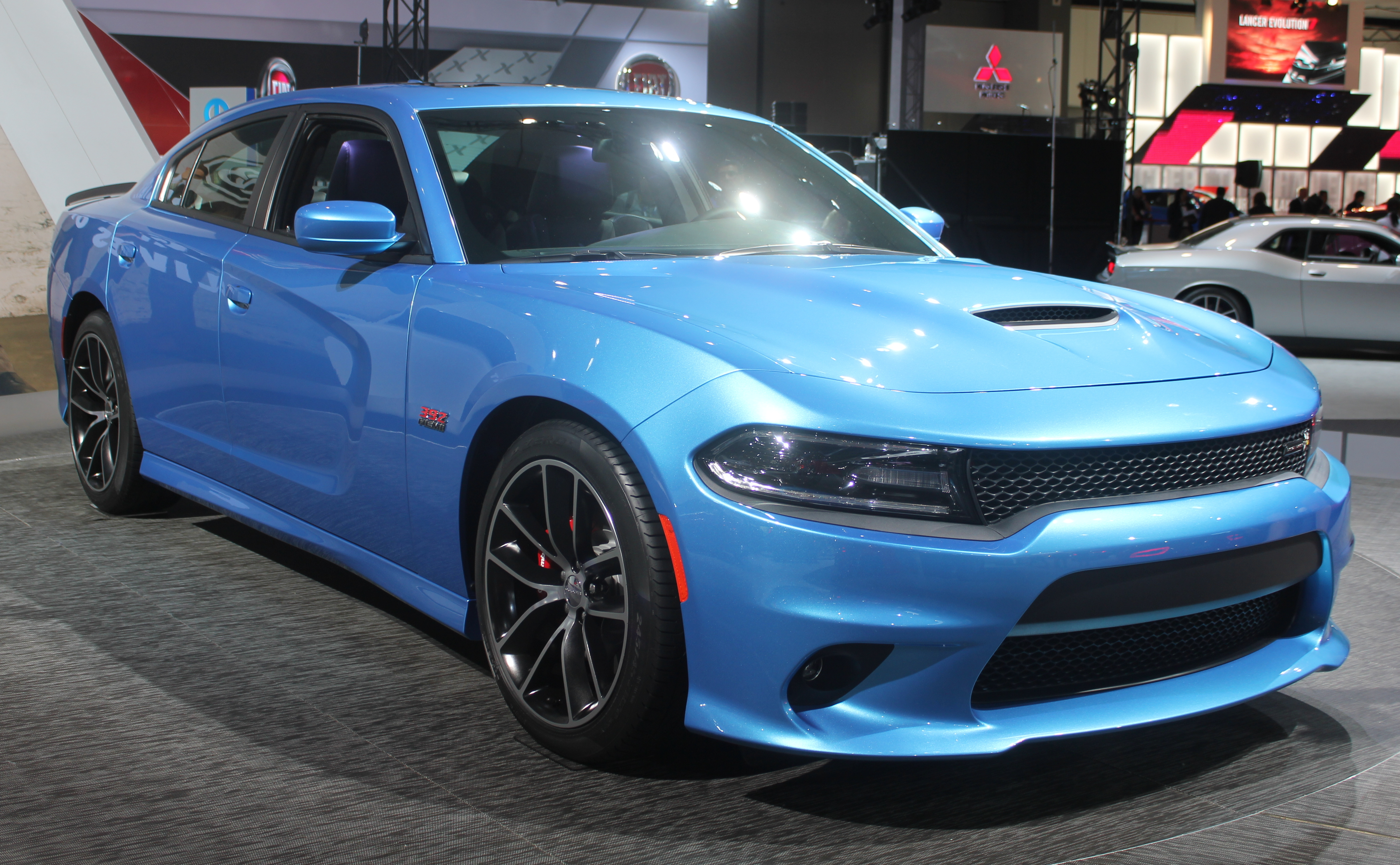
2015 facelift

For 2015, the Charger received significant exterior styling updates. Most notably, the new front end featured new LED lights and a more aerodynamic nose that was less angled and featured a noticeable curve around the headlight housing. Suspensions, interiors, and brakes were also redesigned.

The 2017 model had an upgrade to the 8.4-inch (210 mm) navigation/display system and was restyled due to issues with the previous system.

In 2019 the Scat pack and Hellcat models received a front grille update incorporating so called "snorkels" The Hellcat trim levels also utilized these snorkels as part of the ram air intake which uses a tube directed into the air filter element to provide, cooler air more rapidly under acceleration, this is an option that could be installed by end users on lower trim cars provided they buy the Hellcat lower airbox and inlet tubing.

Except for Charger Pursuit (through 2020), all models came standard with the eight-speed automatic transmission. In December 2014, the AWD Charger Pursuit appeared, and the V8 R/T AWD model disappeared. Sales of the AWD Pursuit increased.

For 2020, the Charger Hellcat comes standard with the "widebody" to accommodate an improved tire/suspension package. Dodge also added a new trim for 2020 called the SRT Hellcat Redeye. The Hellcat Redeye comes standard with the 797 hp (594 kW; 808 PS) V8 engine. The 2020 Charger Pursuit was only available in the RWD V6 and AWD V8 models. Beginning in 2021, the roles reversed, with the V6 Pursuit now equipped with AWD and the 850RChaE 8-spd auto. The V8 Pursuit was RWD with the 8HP70. In 2022, several police models were dropped, including the V8-RWD Charger Pursuit, the V6-AWD Durango Pursuit, and both Durango SSV models. That leaves police with the V6-AWD Charger and V8-AWD Durango Pursuit models, and 4×4 1500/2500/3500 Ram SSV models, through 2023.

In 2022, the Street and Racing Technology team produced the "Jailbreak Edition", based on the 2020 Hellcat Redeye Widebody. SRT added ten extra horsepower from the stock Hellcat Redeye, which totals 807. The idea behind it was for the user to be able to customize the Charger through the factory as if there was a "Jailbreak". The interior offers different options for the floor mats, the colour of the leather seats, logos, sound system, and headliner. The exterior of the Charger has the options to add racing stripes to differ from the Challenger. Users have the option of changing the colour of the car, brake callipers, wheels, badges, exhaust tips, and an option of adding the SRT spoiler.

In January 2022, Dodge announced that the Hemi V8 Charger (5.7L, 6.4L, and 6.2L) would be retired at the end of the 2023 model year.

== Eighth generation: 2024–present (LB) ==
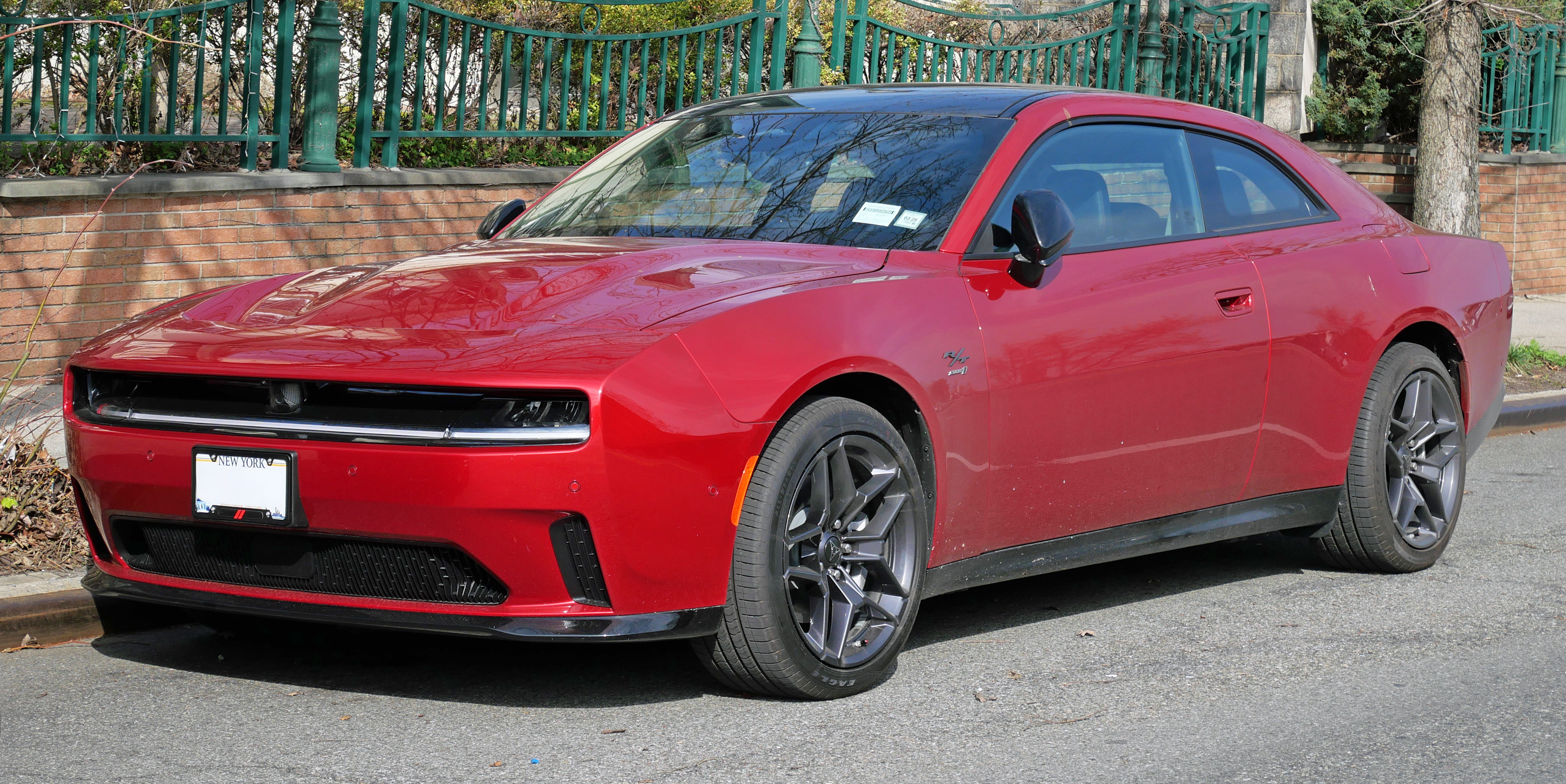
2024 Dodge Charger Daytona RT

The eighth-generation Charger, now in two- and four-door liftback body styles, was introduced for the 2025 model year with the Charger Daytona EV in "R/T" and the "Scat Pack" trim levels. The Charger SixPack was introduced for 2026, with a 3.0 L Hurricane twin-turbo inline-six.

== Other models ==
- Dodge Charger Daytona – the name given to three different modified Dodge Chargers built on the B-body and LX platforms
- Dodge Super Bee
- Shelby Charger
- Dodge Charger R/T (1999 concept)

== See also ==
- 1971–1976 Chrysler Valiant Charger – short wheelbase Valiant coupe produced by Chrysler Australia
- The General Lee – Dodge Charger used in the television series The Dukes of Hazzard
