= Dodge Charger (2024) =

American full-size car

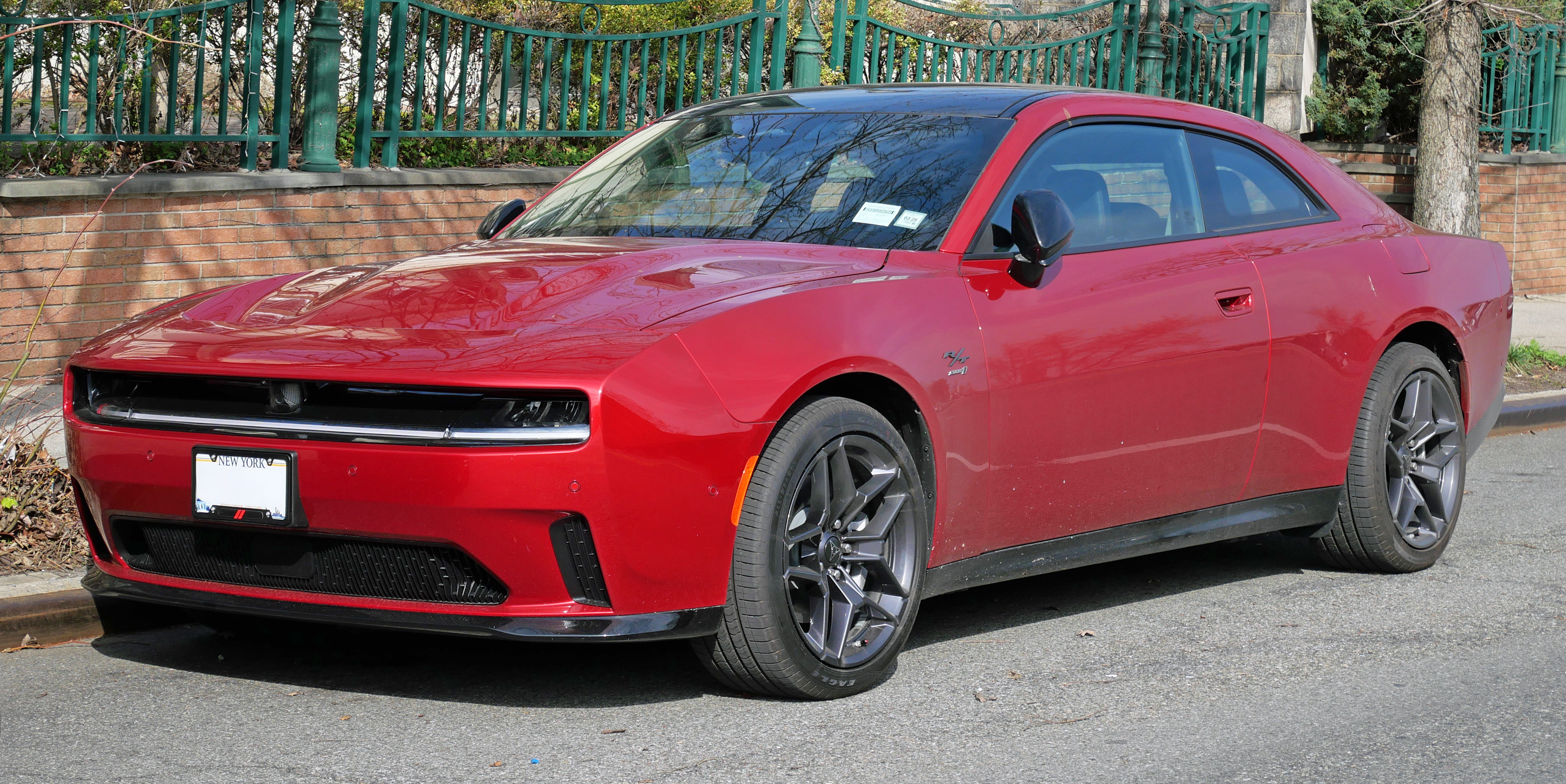
- 2024 Dodge Charger Daytona R/T

Overview
- Manufacturer: Dodge (Stellantis North America)
- Production: December 2024 – present
- Model years: 2024–present
- Assembly: Canada: Windsor, Ontario (Windsor Assembly)
- Designer: Ralph Gilles

Body and chassis
- Class: Full-size car
- Body style: 3/5-door liftback
- Layout: Front-engine, all-wheel-drive (Sixpack); Front-engine, rear-wheel drive (Hustle Stuff Drag Pak); Dual-motor, four-wheel-drive (Daytona)
- Platform: STLA Large

Powertrain
- Engine: Gasoline: 3.0 L Hurricane twin-turbo I6; 5.8 L Hemi supercharged V8 (Hustle Stuff Drag Pak)
- Electric motor: 2× Permanent magnet synchronous motors (R/T & Scat Pack); 496–690 hp (503–700 PS; 370–515 kW) 400-volt
- Transmission: 3-speed automatic (Hustle Stuff Drag Pak); 8-speed ZF TorqueFlite 880RE 2nd automatic (Sixpack)
- Battery: 100.5 kWh Li-NMC
- Range: 317 mi (510 km) (R/T); 260 mi (418 km) (Scat Pack)

Dimensions
- Wheelbase: 121.0 in (3,073 mm)
- Length: 206.6 in (5,248 mm)
- Width: 79.8 in (2,027 mm)
- Height: 58.9–59.0 in (1,496–1,499 mm)
- Curb weight: 5,838 lb (2,648 kg) (Daytona); 4,816 lb (2,185 kg) (Sixpack)

Chronology
- Predecessor: Dodge Charger (2006) (4-door); Dodge Challenger (2008) (2-door)

The eighth-generation Dodge Charger is a battery electric and internal combustion engine full-size car manufactured by Stellantis North America under the Dodge marque, initially with the electric Charger Daytona in December 2024, and gasoline Charger Sixpack in December 2025.

The eighth-generation Charger is available in two-door and four-door liftback body styles, with the former acting as a replacement to the third-generation Challenger.

== Concept car ==
The concept car version called the Dodge Charger Daytona SRT was unveiled on August 17, 2022 during the third day of the Dodge Speed Week event in Pontiac, Michigan. Dodge announced that it will be produced in 2024. It has a new powertrain called the Banshee, which Dodge says acts as the new pinnacle of performance in the Brotherhood of Muscle, eclipsing the Hemi, Hellcat and Redeye engines.

Said to preview the brand's electrified future, it features a Fratzonic Chambered exhaust system that can reach 126 dB, making it as loud as a Hellcat-powered Dodge. The system pushes its sound through an amplifier and tuning chamber located at the rear of the vehicle.

Dodge showed a red Charger Daytona SRT concept at SEMA in November 2022, including a Bugatti-like speed key for increasing power up to 670 hp (679 PS; 500 kW).

The concept car appeared alongside the DeLorean Alpha5 in the Fast X movie.

Concept car

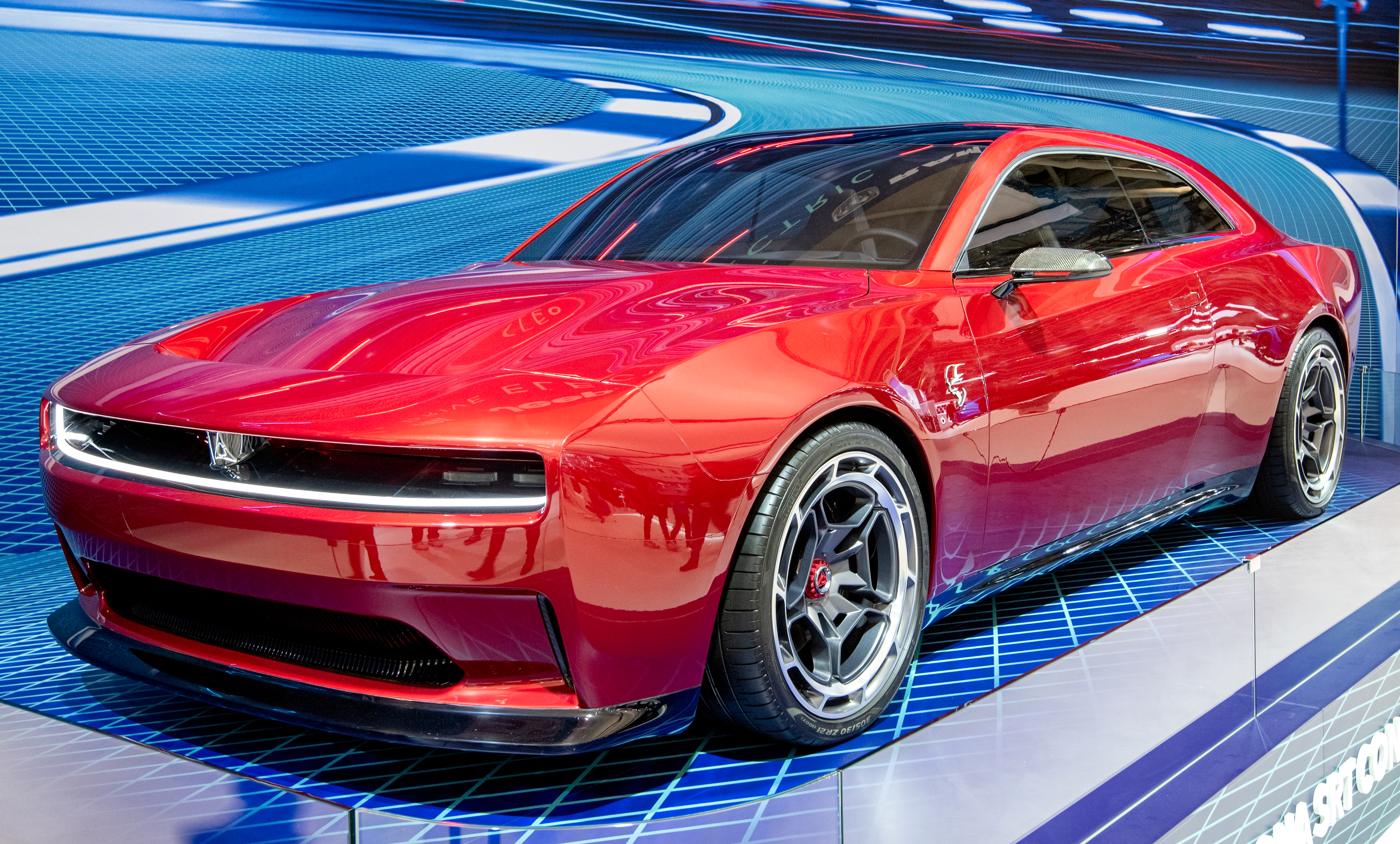
Front view

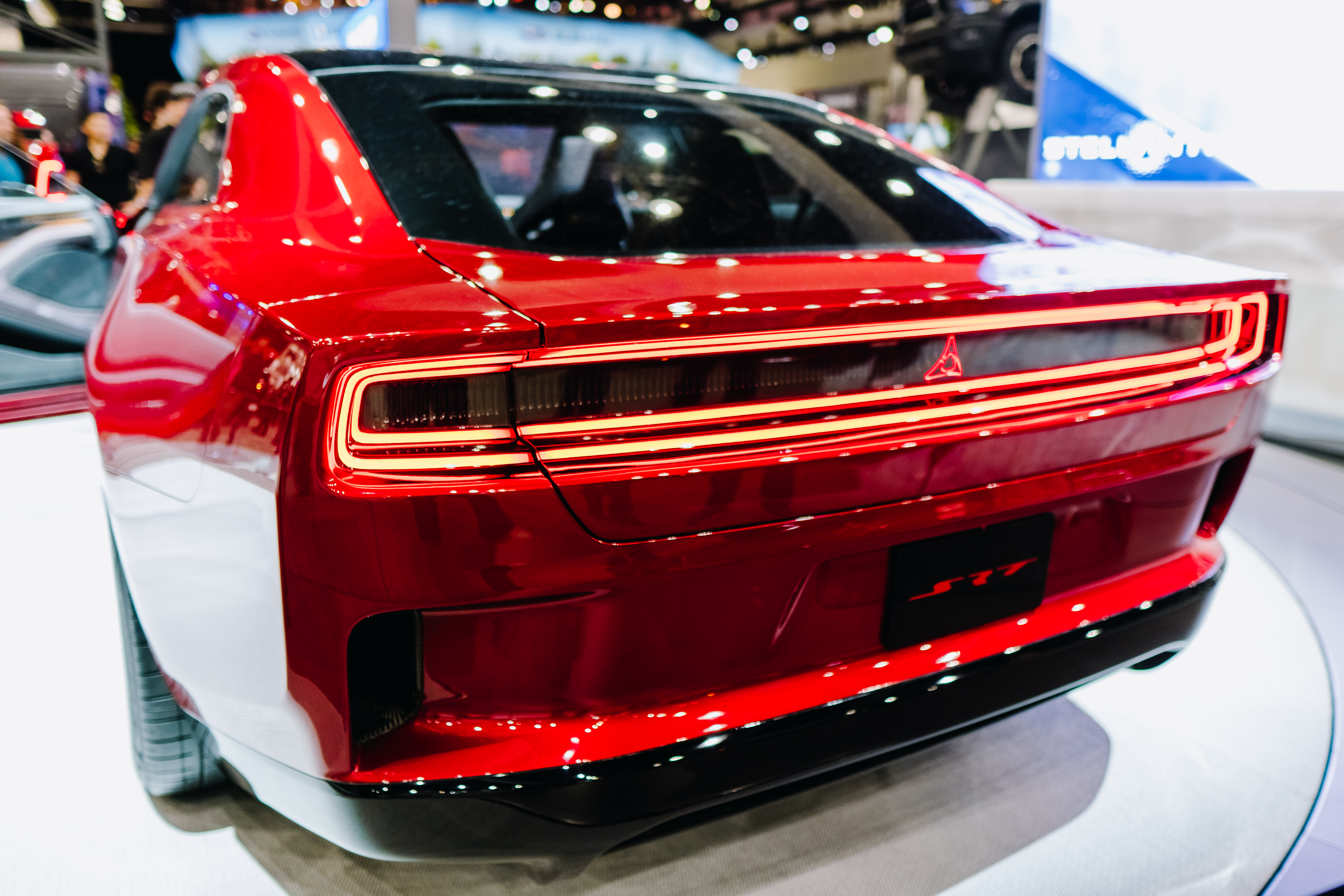
Rear view

== Production version ==
On June 8, 2026 Dodge announced it will sell the Charger in Europe.

=== Charger Daytona ===
On March 5, 2024, the Dodge Charger was previewed in 2-door and 4-door forms, with the 2-door slated to go on sale in 2024 and the 4-door in 2025. The Charger Daytona will be available in two versions, R/T and Scat Pack with 496 and 670 hp (503 and 679 PS; 370 and 500 kW), respectively, from two electric motors. Both come standard with all-wheel drive and a 100.5 kilowatt-hour battery.

On August 7, 2024, Stellantis announced the price of the car to be $59,595 for the 2024 Dodge Charger Daytona R/T, and $73,190 for the 2024 Dodge Charger Daytona Scat Pack and both models would qualify for a $7,500 federal tax credit if leased.

The first batch of Charger Daytona models arrived at dealerships in January 2025.

Charger Daytona R/T

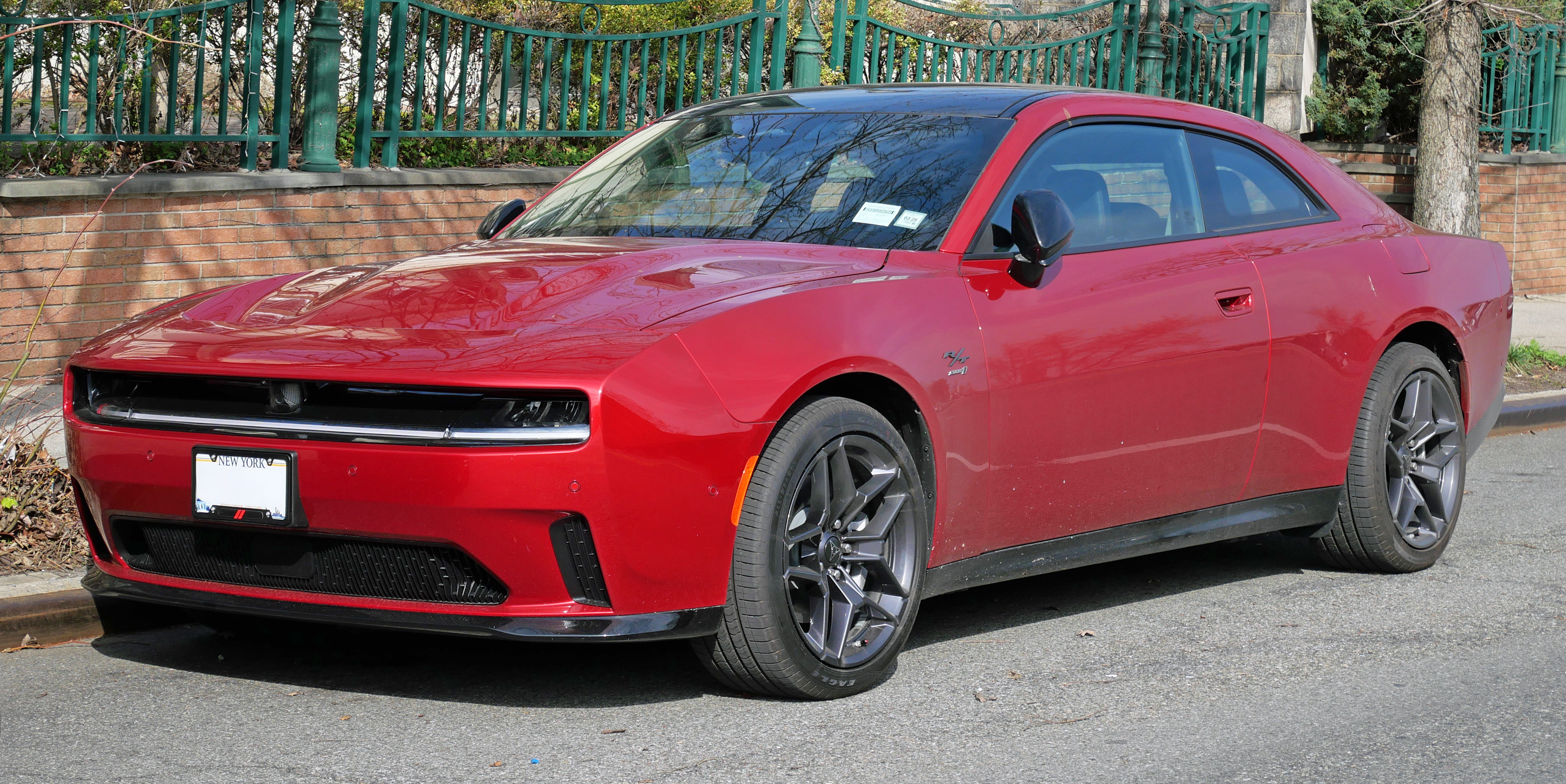
2 door Front view

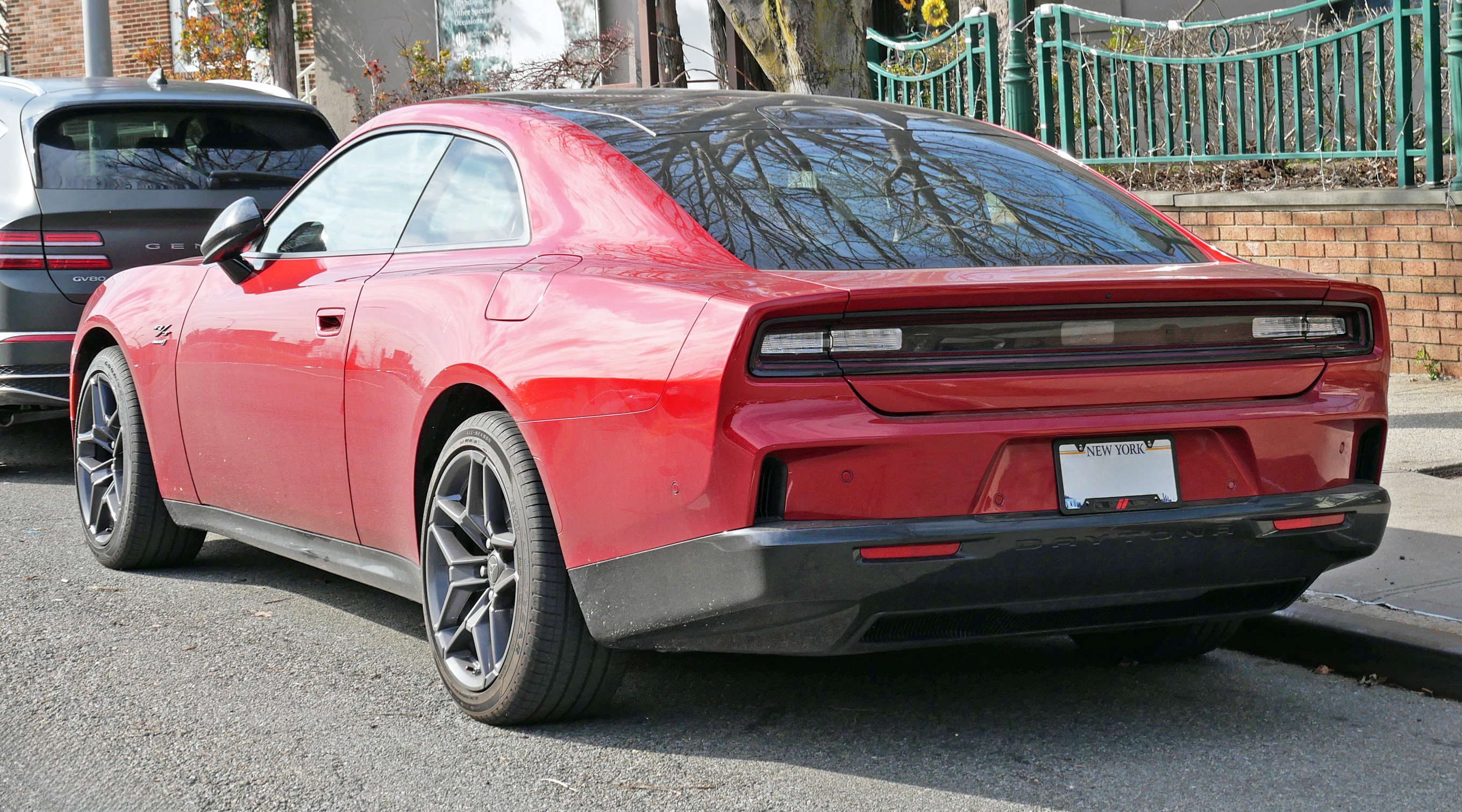
2 door Rear view

=== Charger Sixpack ===
In August 2023, it was reported that the production version of the Charger will be available with a gasoline inline-six Hurricane engine, while the range topping Daytona will be fully electric powered.

The Charger Sixpack is powered by the 3.0-liter twin-turbo gasoline inline-six Hurricane engine. The engine offered for the Charger R/T at 420 hp (426 PS; 313 kW) and for the Charger Scat Pack at 550 hp (558 PS; 410 kW). It is able to switch from all-wheel drive to rear-wheel drive.

In the Charger Sixpack range, the Charger Scat Pack was released first, in late 2025, and the Charger R/T was released in the first half of 2026. The two-door Scat Pack is to begin deliveries in December 2025.

Charger Sixpack

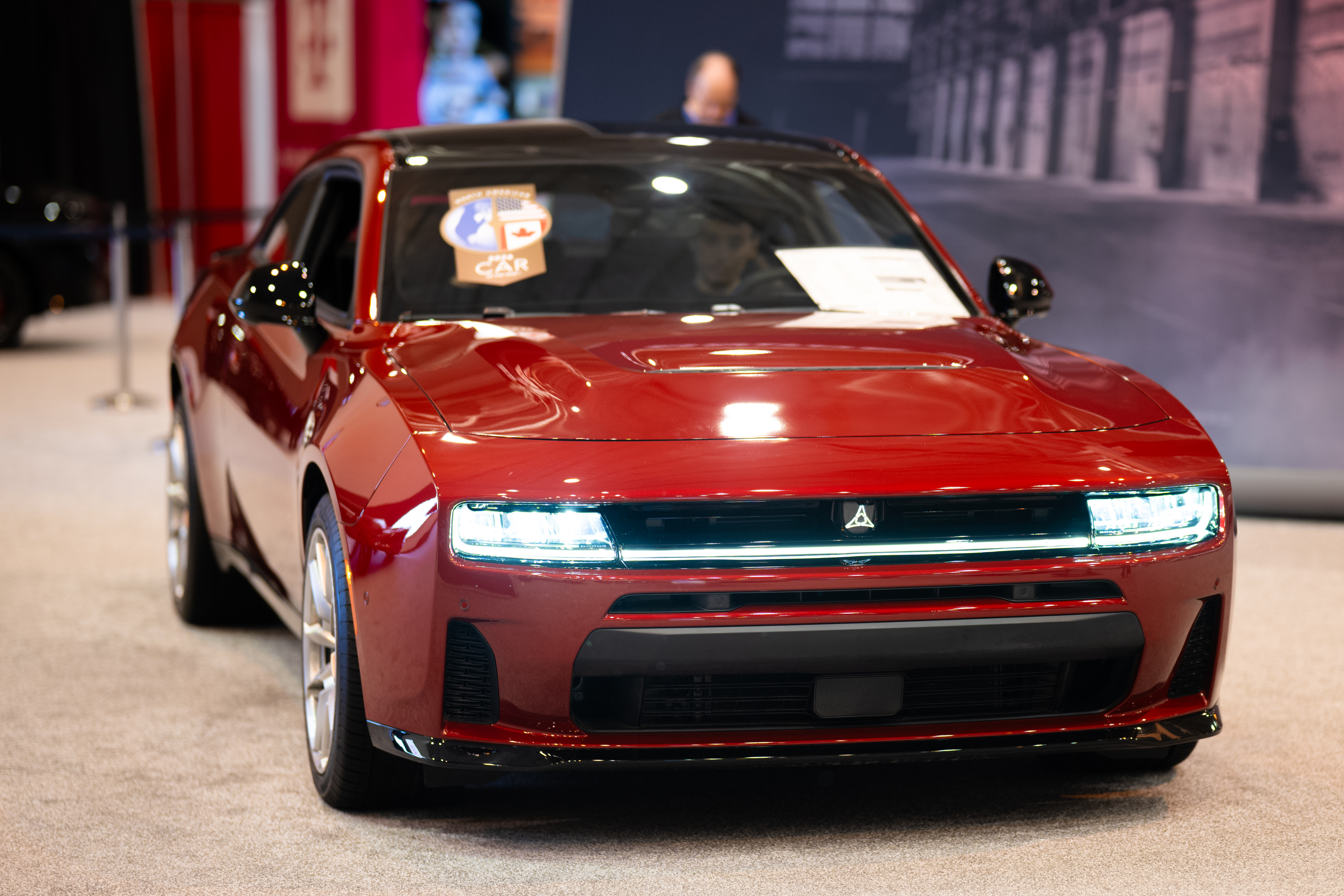
Front view

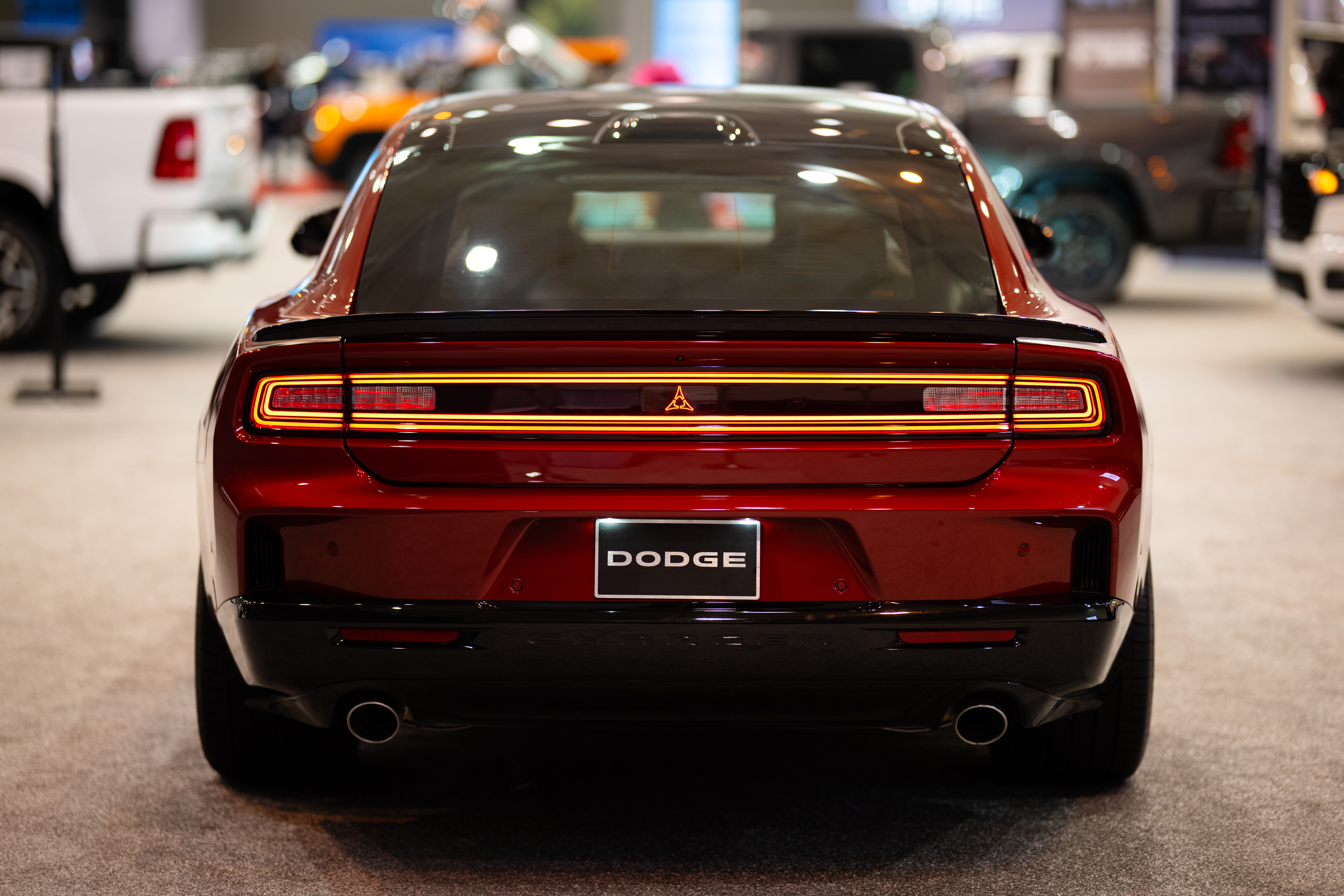
Rear view

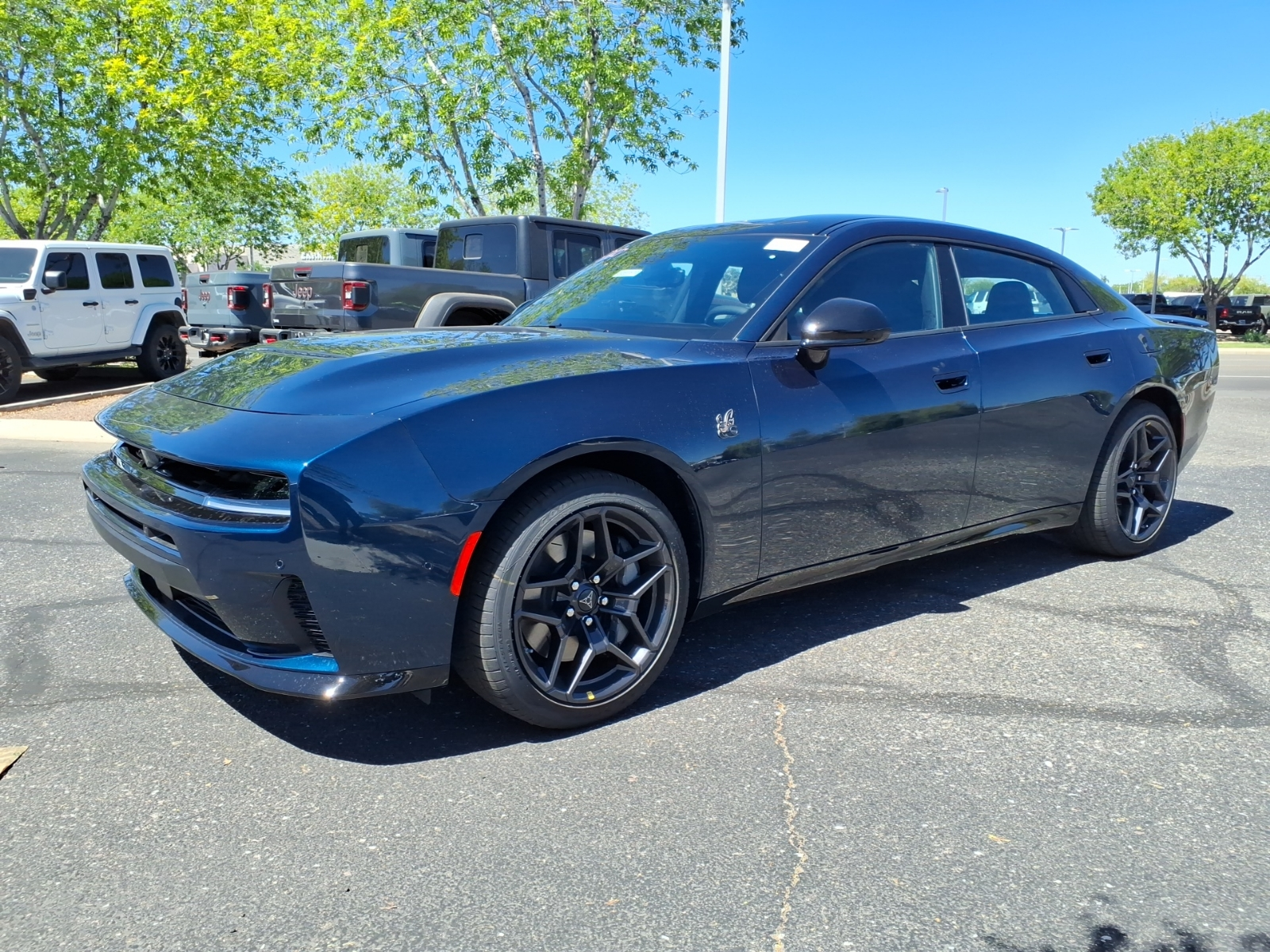
Side view (4-door)

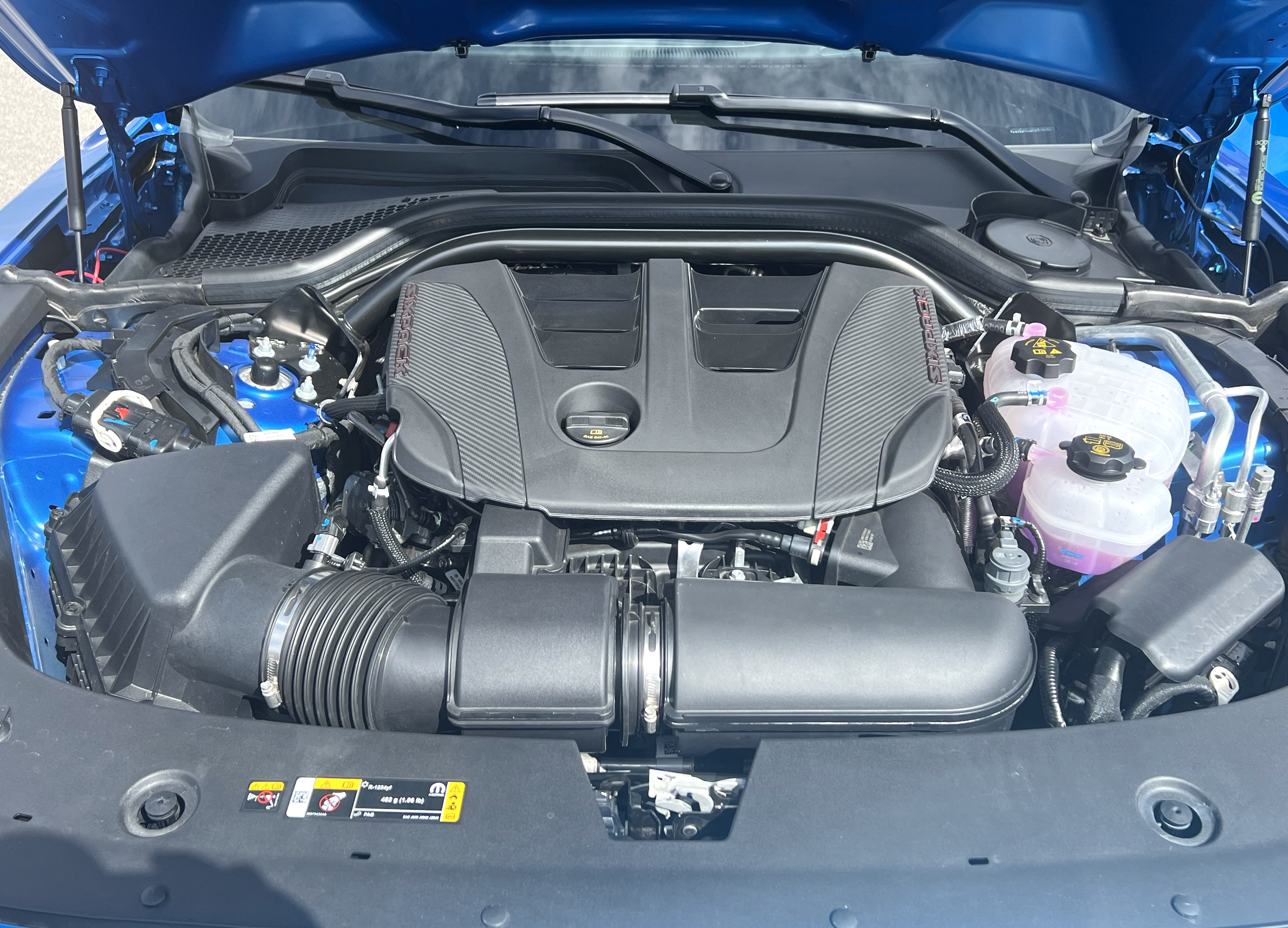
Engine bay

=== Special editions ===
In October 2025, Dodge announced the Hustle Stuff Drag Pak, a track-only drag car with a 5.8-liter supercharged Hemi V8, and 3-speed automatic transmission. Only 50 units are to be produced.

On August 7, 2026, Dodge announced the Super Bee for the 2027 model year. It increases the output of the High Output Hurricane engine by 50 hp (51 PS; 37 kW) to 600 hp (608 PS; 447 kW), with the torque figure unchanged from 531 lb⋅ft (720 N⋅m), but with peak torque arriving at 3,000 rpm instead of 3,500. The Super Bee also features a redesigned front end, which Dodge claims increases downforce, as well as upgraded Brembo brakes, a new set of CDC dual-valve adaptive dampers, a stiffer rear anti-roll bar, and stiffer front bushings. Dodge claims a 3.6 second 0–60 mph (0–97 km/h) time and 11.8 second quarter mile time.

== Powertrain ==
Specifications
Model	Year	Transmission	Power	Torque
Electric
Electric motors	2025–present		670 hp (679 PS; 500 kW)	627 lb⋅ft (850 N⋅m)
Electric motors	2025–present		496 hp (503 PS; 370 kW)	404 lb⋅ft (548 N⋅m)
Gasoline
3.0L Hurricane Standard Output	2026–present	8-speed automatic	420 hp (426 PS; 313 kW)	468 lb⋅ft (635 N⋅m)
3.0L Hurricane High Output	2026–present	8-speed automatic	550–600 hp (558–608 PS; 410–447 kW)	531 lb⋅ft (720 N⋅m)
5.8L HEMI Supercharged V8 (Hustle Stuff Drag Pak)	October 2025–present (Limited 50 units)	3-speed automatic		

== Sales ==
Year	United States	Canada
2024	0	54
2025	7,421	689
