= Stellantis Hurricane engine =

Hurricane GME-T6
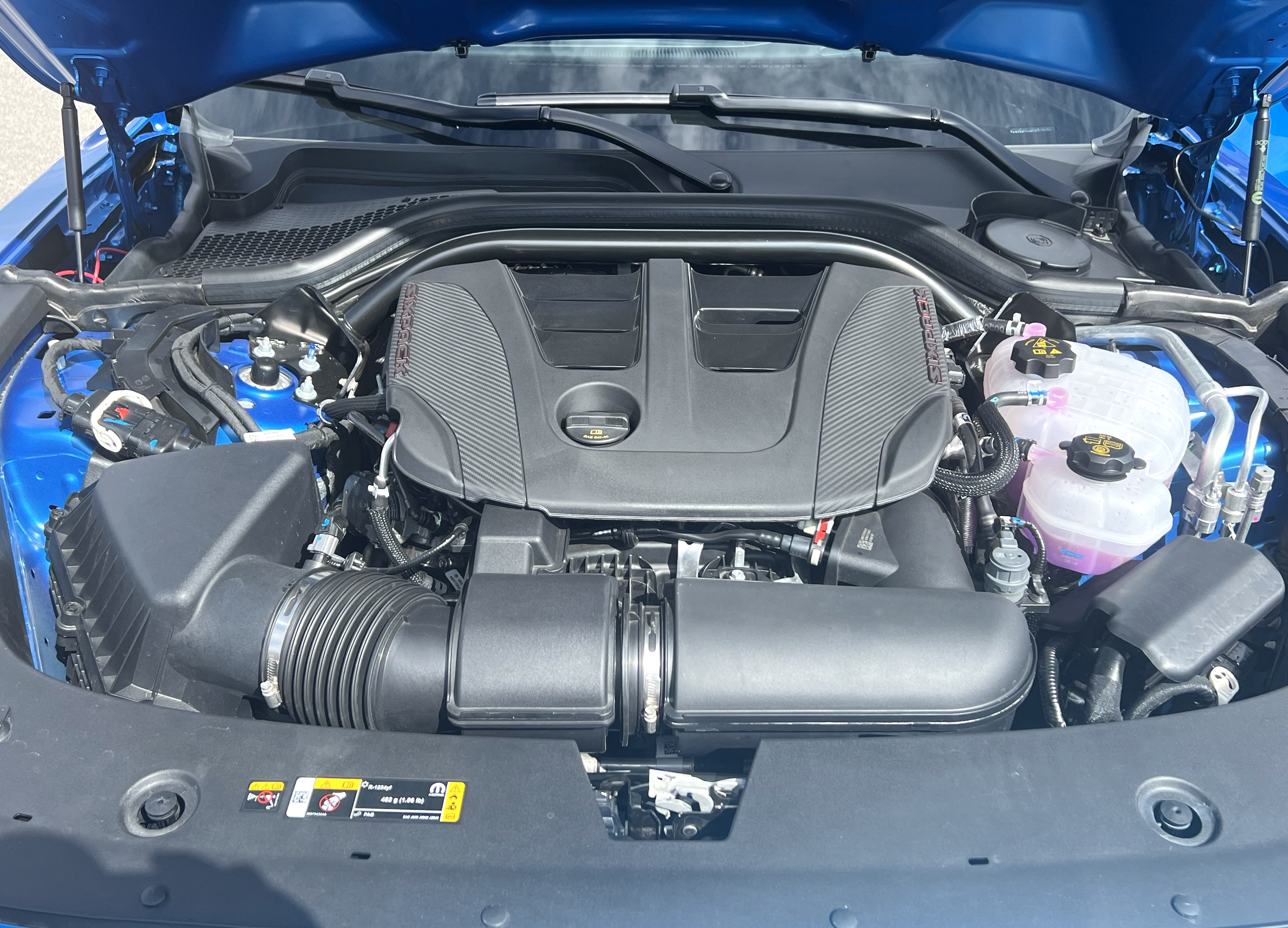
- Hurricane engine in a Dodge Charger Sixpack

Overview
- Manufacturer: Chrysler (now Stellantis North America)
- Production: 2021−present

Layout
- Configuration: Straight-six
- Displacement: 2,993 cc (182.6 cu in)
- Cylinder bore: 84.0 mm (3.31 in)
- Piston stroke: 90.0 mm (3.54 in)
- Cylinder block material: Aluminum
- Cylinder head material: Aluminum
- Valvetrain: DOHC 24-valve
- Compression ratio: SO: 10.4:1; HO: 9.5:1

RPM range
- Max. engine speed: SO: 5,800 rpm; HO: 6,100 rpm

Combustion
- Turbocharger: Twin high-flow
- Fuel system: Direct injection, ≤ 35 MPa
- Fuel type: Gasoline
- Oil system: Wet sump
- Cooling system: Water-cooled

Output
- Power output: SO: 420 hp (310 kW); HO: 510–600 hp (380–450 kW)
- Specific power: ≥ 133 hp/L
- Torque output: SO: 468–469 lb⋅ft (635–636 N⋅m); HO: 500–531 lb⋅ft (678–720 N⋅m)

Dimensions
- Dry weight: SO: 430 lb (200 kg); HO: 441 lb (200 kg)

Emissions
- Emissions target standard: Federal Tier III
- Emissions control systems: Three-way catalytic converters, heated oxygen sensors, cooled EGR (SO only)

The Chrysler Hurricane GME-T6 engine is a twin-turbocharged straight-six engine produced by Chrysler (now Stellantis North America) since November 2021 at their Saltillo Engine Plant and announced publicly in March 2022.

The engine made its debut in the Jeep Grand Wagoneer in 2022. It was then added to the 2025 Ram 1500 mid-cycle refresh and was later added to the Dodge Charger range in late 2025. It is expected to be added to the Jeep Grand Cherokee in 2028.

== Overview ==
It had been in development since 2013 by then Chrysler Group LLC with the initial design dating back as far as 2009, as a response to Ford’s then new EcoBoost engine. It debuted with two versions, standard output (SO) and high output (HO), both featuring a start-stop system but designed for more extensive electrification in the future.

Despite having cylinder spacing and bore and stroke in common with the FCA Global Medium Engine, and valvetrain similarities, "less than 5% of content on the new Hurricane is shared with existing engines." The engine was developed at the Chrysler Headquarters and Technology Center in Auburn Hills, Michigan, over the course of three years.

Stellantis North America (Chrysler Group) expects the Hurricane engine to be the main internal combustion power plant for future Chrysler (brand), Dodge, Jeep, and Ram Trucks vehicles in the North American market, and is offering its use to other automobile manufacturers. The manufacturer claims the engine is up to 15 percent more efficient than larger engines.

The high-output (HO) variant has 54mm Garrett GT2054 turbochargers, forged aluminum pistons, and a forged steel crankshaft.

=== Applications ===
Year(s)	Model	Power	Torque
2022–present	Jeep Wagoneer (WS)	420 hp (313 kW) at 5,200 rpm 510 hp (380 kW) at 5,700 rpm 540 hp (403 kW) at 6,200 rpm	468–521 lb⋅ft (635–706 N⋅m) at 3,500 rpm
2024–present	Ram 1500 (DT)	420 hp (313 kW) at 5,200 rpm 540 hp (403 kW) at 5,700 rpm	469 lb⋅ft (636 N⋅m) at 3,900 rpm 521 lb⋅ft (706 N⋅m) at 3,500 rpm
2025–present	Dodge Charger (2024)	420–600 hp (313–447 kW)	468–531 lb⋅ft (635–720 N⋅m)

== See also ==
- Hurricane 4 EVO
