= Jeep Grand Wagoneer (WS) =

Luxury full-size SUV by Jeep

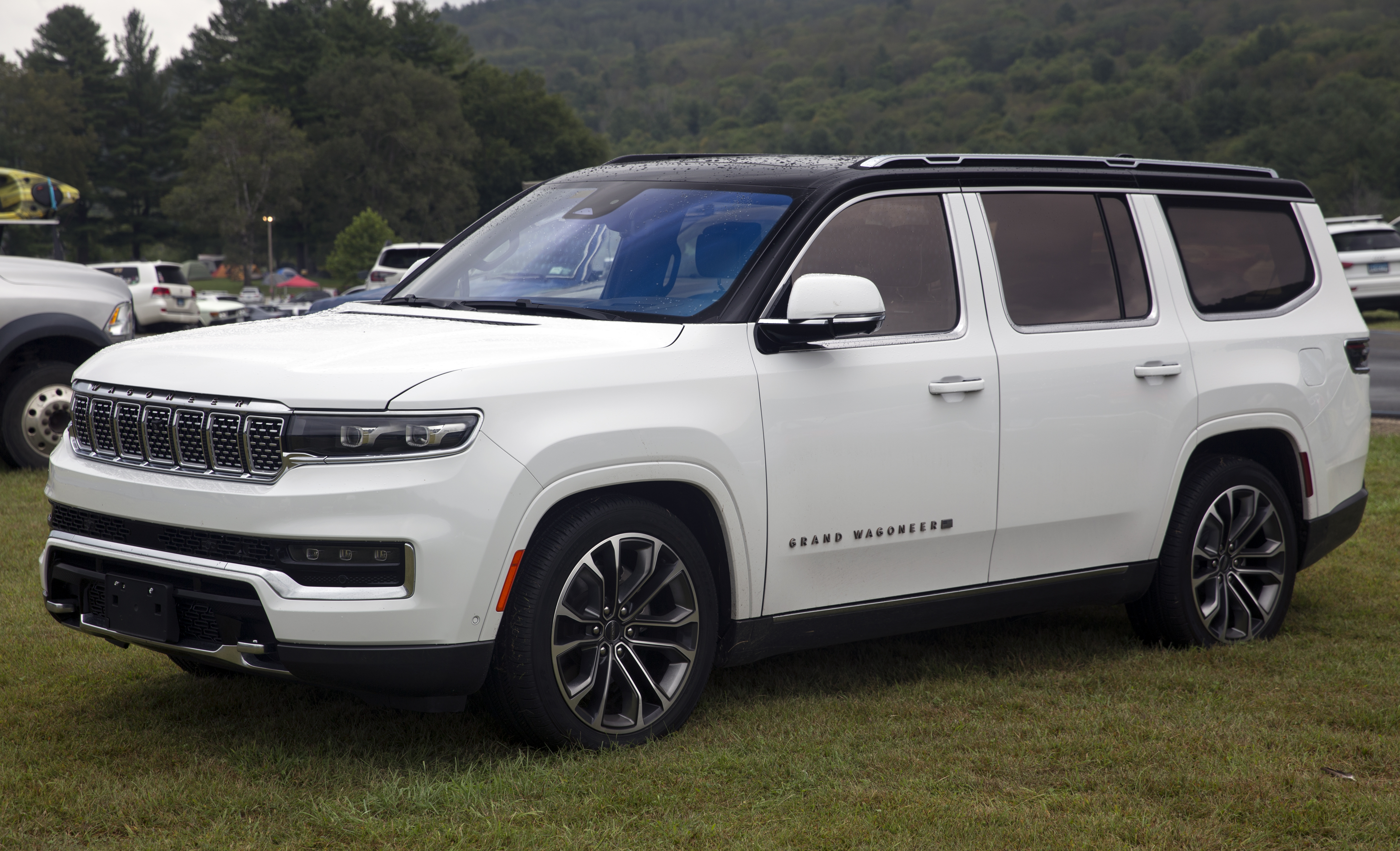
- 2022 Grand Wagoneer Series III

Overview
- Manufacturer: Jeep (Stellantis North America)
- Model code: WS
- Also called: Jeep Wagoneer (2022–2025)
- Production: 2021–present
- Model years: 2022–present
- Assembly: United States: Warren, Michigan (Warren Truck Assembly)
- Designer: Ralph Gilles

Body and chassis
- Class: Full-size SUV (2022–2025 Wagoneer, 2026– Grand Wagoneer); Full-size luxury SUV (2022–2025 Grand Wagoneer only)
- Layout: Front-engine, rear-wheel-drive; Front-engine, four-wheel-drive
- Chassis: Body-on-frame
- Related: Ram 1500 (DT); Ram 1500 REV; Ram 1500 TRX; Ram Heavy Duty

Powertrain
- Engine: Gasoline: 3.0 L Hurricane twin-turbo I6; 6.4 L Hemi V8 (Grand Wagoneer) (2021-2024); Gasoline mild hybrid (MHEV): 5.7 L Hemi V8 (Wagoneer)
- Electric motor: 16 hp (12 kW) Magneti Marelli (MHEV)
- Transmission: 8-speed ZF 8HP75 automatic
- Hybrid drivetrain: eTorque belted alternator starter (MHEV)
- Battery: 0.43 kWh, 48 V lithium-ion (MHEV)

Dimensions
- Wheelbase: 123.0 in (3,124 mm); 130.0 in (3,302 mm) (L)
- Length: 214.7 in (5,453 mm); 226.7 in (5,758 mm) (L)
- Width: 83.6 in (2,123 mm)
- Height: 75.6 in (1,920 mm)
- Curb weight: 5,960–6,420 lb (2,700–2,910 kg); 6,068–6,704 lb (2,752–3,041 kg) (L)

Chronology
- Predecessor: Jeep Wagoneer (SJ)

The Jeep Grand Wagoneer is a full-size SUV produced by the Jeep division of Stellantis North America. Originally launched in March 2021 under two sub-models; the Wagoneer and Grand Wagoneer, they were initially branded as "Wagoneer by Jeep" without the Jeep badge on vehicles and were described as a "premium extension" of the Jeep brand in marketing copy. The Wagoneer served as the affordable mainstream model, while the Grand Wagoneer was the luxury version. Both were available in short wheelbase and long wheelbase "L" configurations. Production of the 2022 Wagoneer and Grand Wagoneer commenced in the first half of 2021 at Warren Truck Assembly.

Due to customer confusion, the Wagoneer line was absorbed into Grand Wagoneer line in 2026.

== History ==
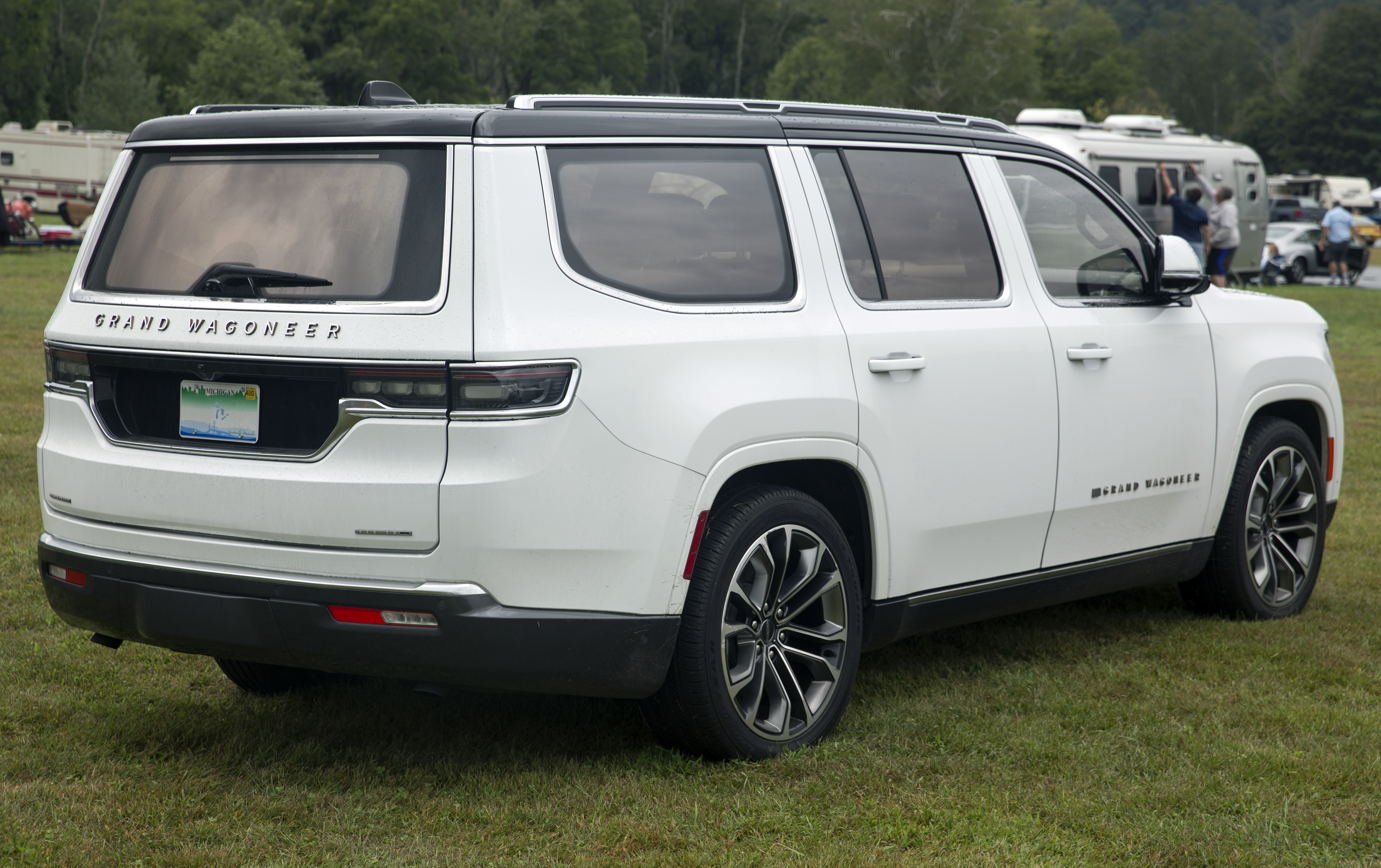
Rear view (Series III)

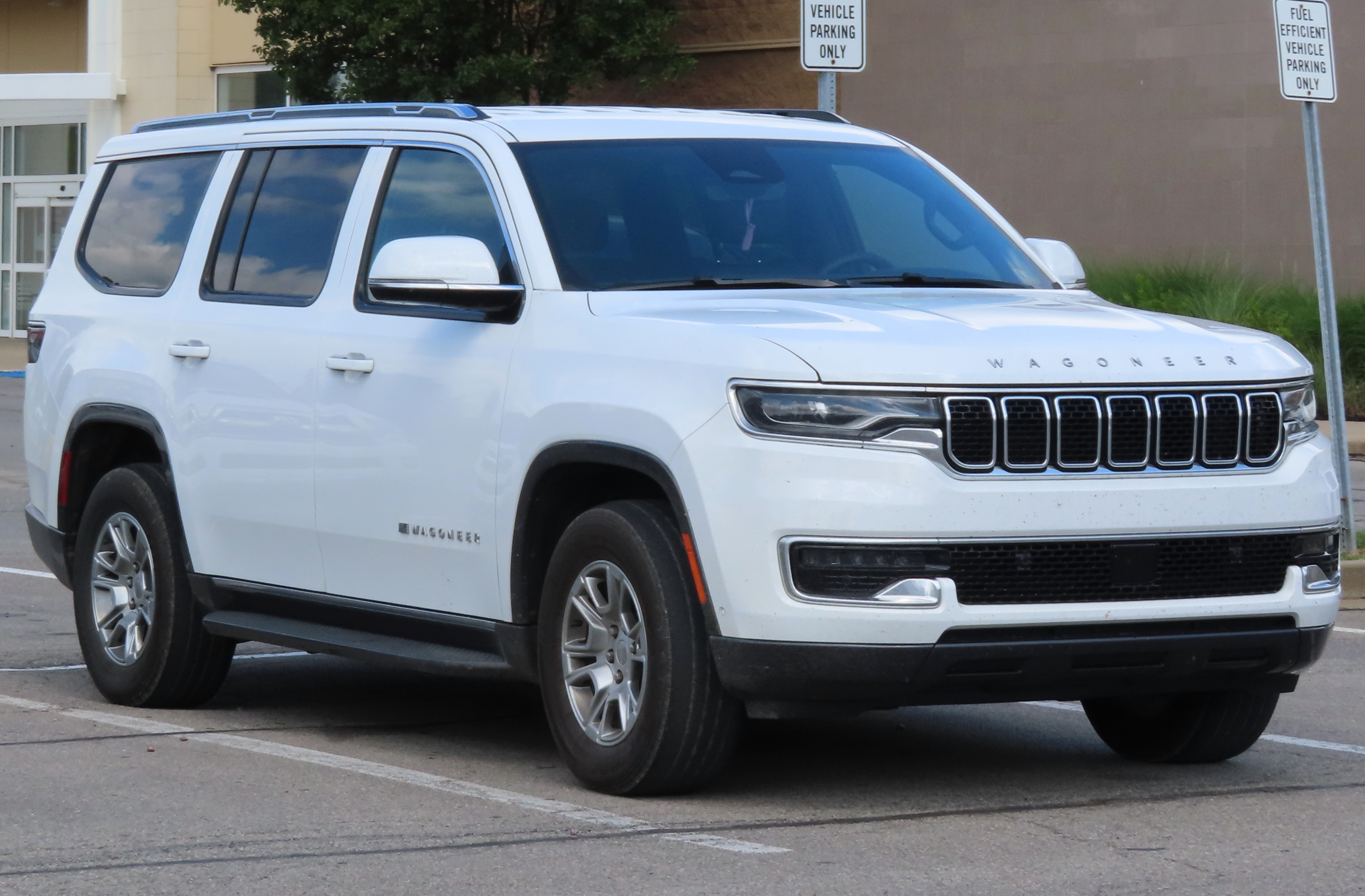

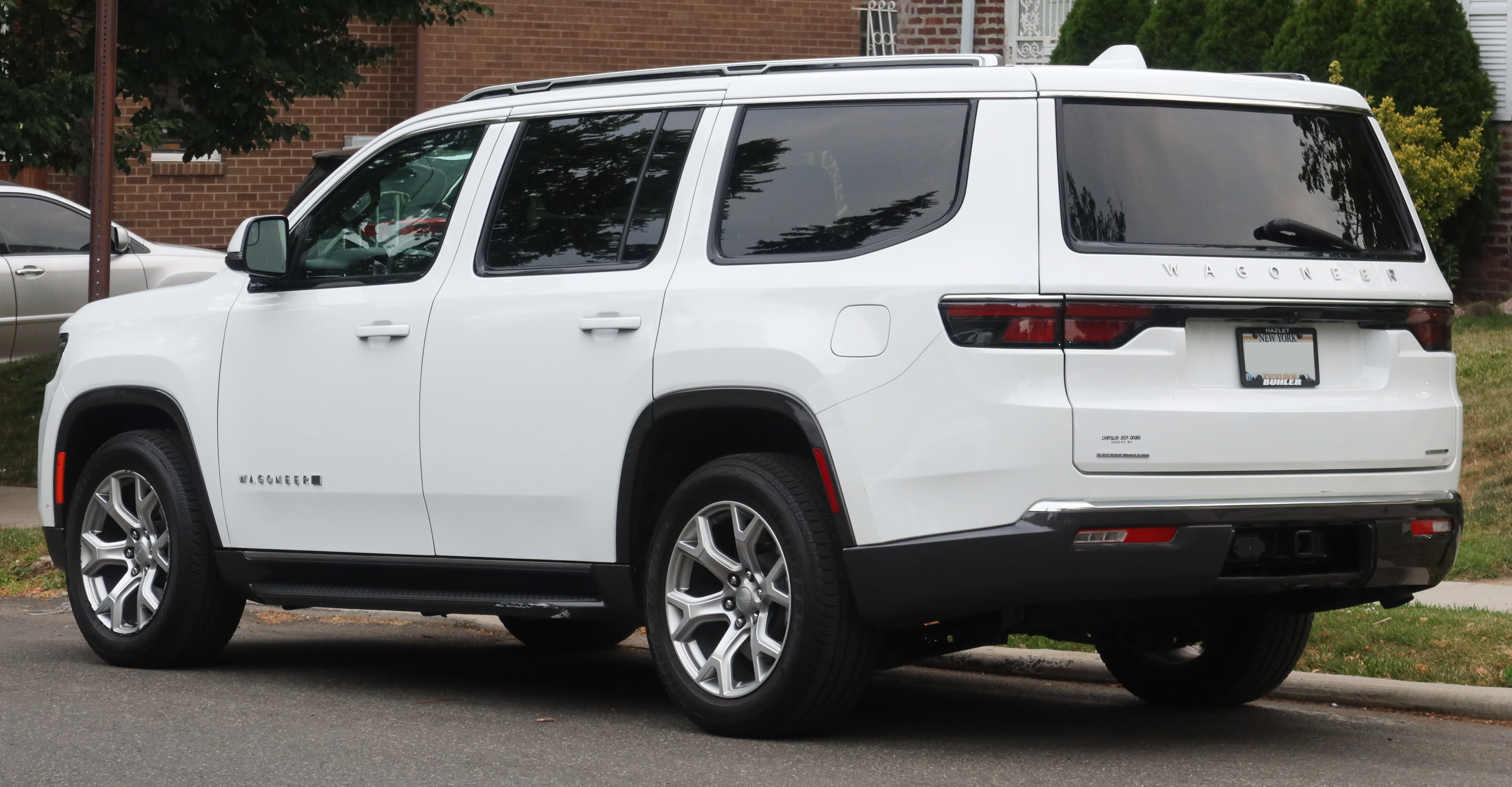
2022 Wagoneer Series I

Jeep had been continually attempting to redesign the Wagoneer since the mid-1990s with various proposals. In January 2011, Sergio Marchionne, CEO of Fiat S.p.A. and later Fiat Chrysler Automobiles (FCA), announced at his press conference at the North American International Auto Show in Detroit that the name "Grand Wagoneer" would be relaunched as a new SUV built on the same platform as the Jeep Grand Cherokee and the Dodge Durango. On September 2, 2013, Chrysler announced that they would delay production until 2015 to allow the Dodge Durango to find an audience but at the same time would use the Grand Wagoneer concept as a basis for a full-size luxury SUV that would compete against the Cadillac Escalade and Lincoln Navigator, whose redesigns went on sale in 2014.

On June 9, 2015, FCA announced that it would unveil a new version of the full-sized Grand Wagoneer at its dealers' convention on August 25, 2015. In August 2015, however, FCA announced that the production of the upcoming Grand Cherokee replacement would be delayed into 2018 and was scheduled to be built at Warren Truck Assembly. On October 18, 2016, Jeep released teaser photos of the Grand Wagoneer, which indicated that it would be based on the third generation Durango and introduced as a 2019 model. The plan was delayed again in March 2017.

On December 5, 2019, spy shots surfaced of FCA testing a Wagoneer using a Ram 1500 body on frame SUV. Due to the 2020 COVID-19 pandemic, FCA delayed the start of production by at least three months and was expected to debut this full-size version in early 2021 as a 2022 model.

On September 3, 2020, Jeep presented the Grand Wagoneer concept, which foreshadowed the next Grand Wagoneer marketed in 2021. The SUV is distinguished by a massive silhouette with oblong headlights and a multi-hole grille. A characteristic feature is the lack of Jeep-branded markings on the body and in the passenger compartment in favor of badges with the model name. Production models of the Wagoneer were revealed on March 11, 2021. The first models were expected to ship later in the year, with general dealership availability starting October 2021.

On July 3, 2023, the Grand Wagoneer was launched in the Middle East.

=== 2026 Facelift ===
In October 2025, Jeep unveiled the facelifted Grand Wagoneer. Every model was renamed "Grand Wagoneer", absorbing the previous standalone Wagoneer line. Models now also featured "Jeep" branding on the outside, as plans to turn Wagoneer into a sub-brand were scrapped. The front-end was also redesigned, with a new grille and headlights. In addition, all chrome trim was switched over to silver metallic trim on the Grand Wagoneer.

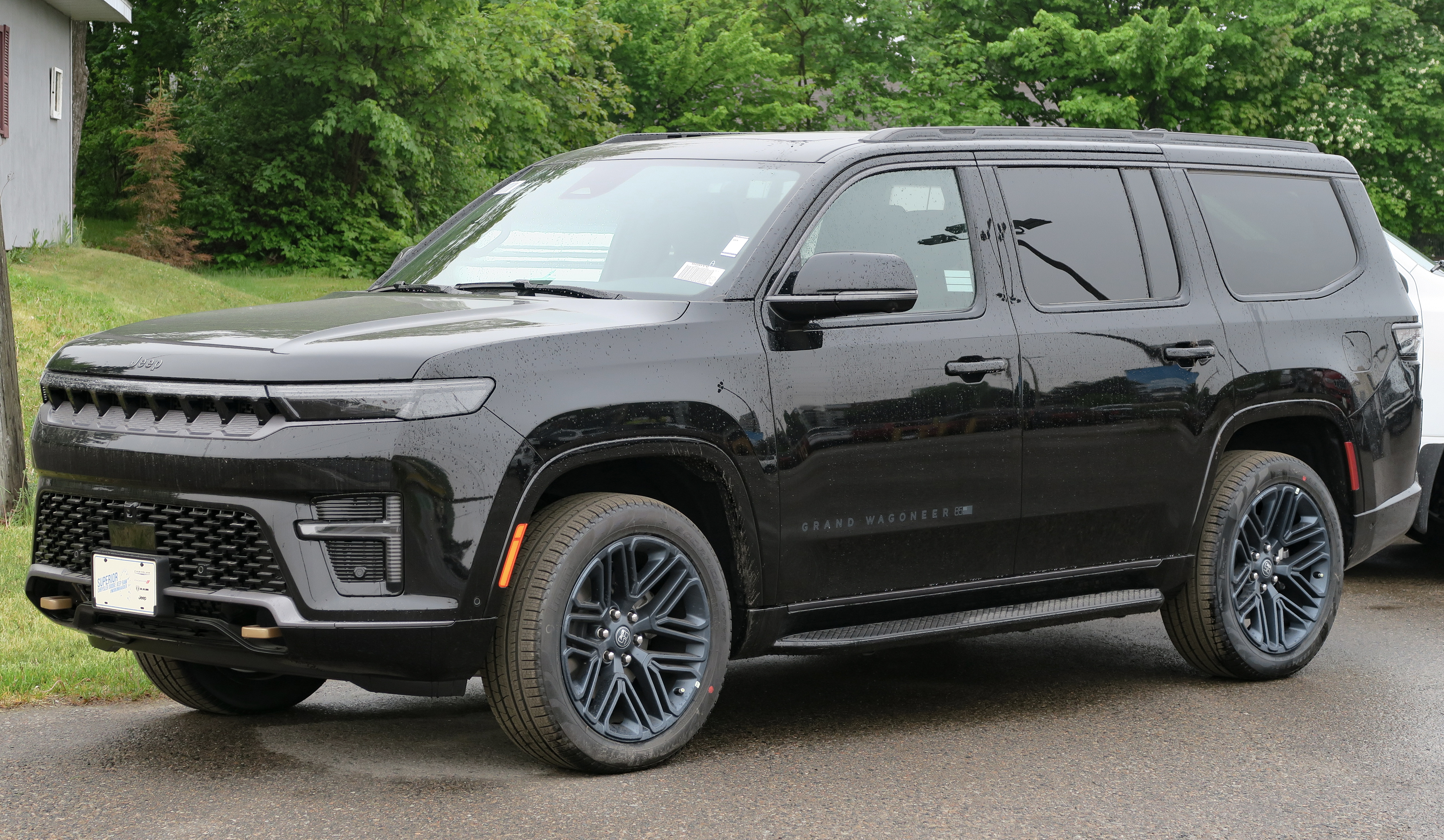
Front

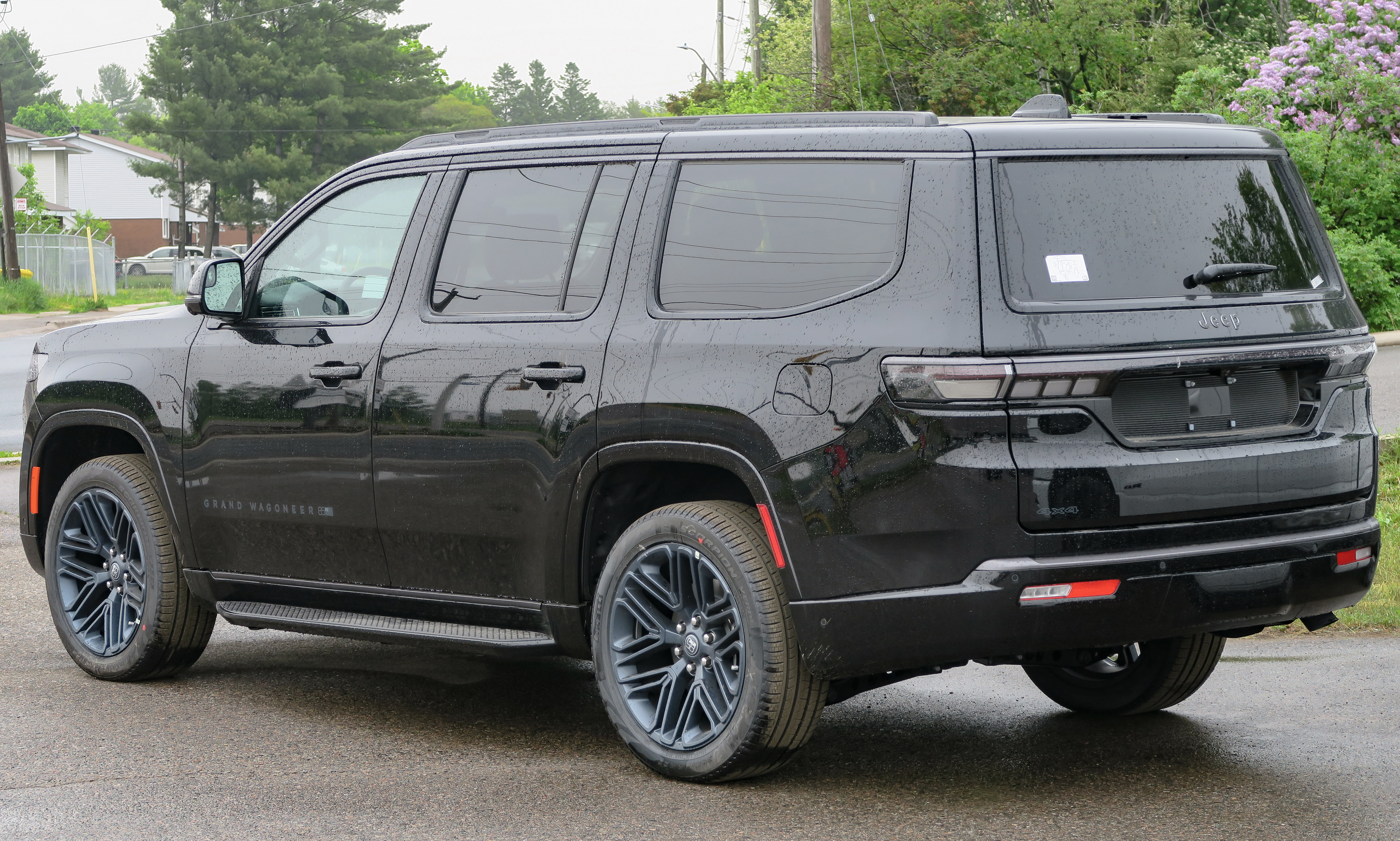
Rear

== Layout ==
Rear-wheel drive is standard on the Wagoneer model with optional four-wheel drive available, while four-wheel drive is standard on the Grand Wagoneer. Furthermore, introduced to the selection is the Quadra-Trac full-time four-wheel-drive system.

== Trims ==
At launch, the Wagoneer was offered in four trim levels: Series I, Series II, Carbide, and Series III. The Grand Wagoneer was offered in five: Series I, Series II, Obsidian, Series III, and Series III Obsidian. All trim levels were offered with the Standard or Long Wheelbase "L." For 2026, the trim levels were renamed with the standalone Wagoneer line being discontinued. The trims for the Grand Wagoneer became: base, Limited Altitude, Upland, Limited Reserve, Summit Obsidian, and Summit Reserve. All trims are available in both standard and long wheelbase "L" configurations, with the exception of the Upland, which is available in standard wheelbase only.

== Features ==
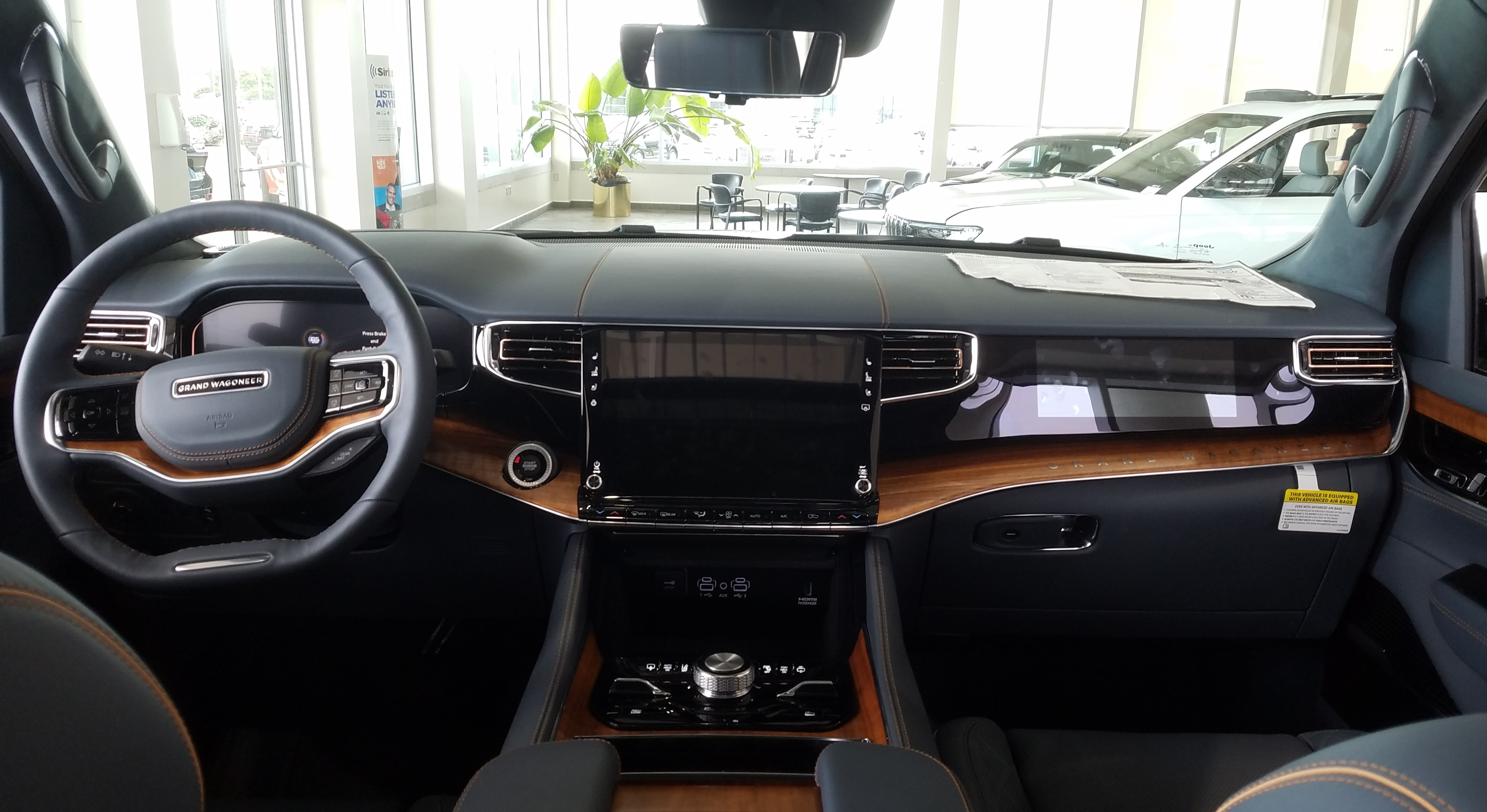
Grand Wagoneer interior

The fifth-generation UConnect 5 infotainment suite is available 10.1" in the Wagoneer, or 12" in the Grand Wagoneer. Other features include Amazon Alexa, wireless Apple CarPlay, and Android Auto smartphone integration, SiriusXM Satellite Radio with 360L, SiriusXM Travel Link services, and SiriusXM-powered UConnect Guardian.

There are two McIntosh premium audio systems available on the Wagoneer and Grand Wagoneer: a 19-speaker system with 950-watt amplifier and 10" subwoofer, and a larger 23-speaker McIntosh system with 1,375-watt amplifier and 12" subwoofer.

Both the Wagoneer and Grand Wagoneer feature several standard screens, with several more screens being available as options. These include a standard digital instrument cluster, a central touchscreen infotainment system, and an interactive front passenger touchscreen display integrated into the woodgrain on the passenger side of the dashboard and allowing the passenger to stream music wirelessly to the vehicle's audio system via Bluetooth, view the GPS navigation map, and send directions directly to the central touchscreen display. The display features a special coating that is only viewable to the passenger, so as not to distract the driver while the vehicle is in motion. Several models also feature a touchscreen control panel for the rear seat climate controls, as well as a dual-screen rear seat entertainment system that allows rear seat passengers to connect their own external devices via HDMI or Bluetooth, connect to the Internet, view entertainment from Amazon, and play integrated games via the seatback-mounted displays.

== Wagoneer L and Grand Wagoneer L ==
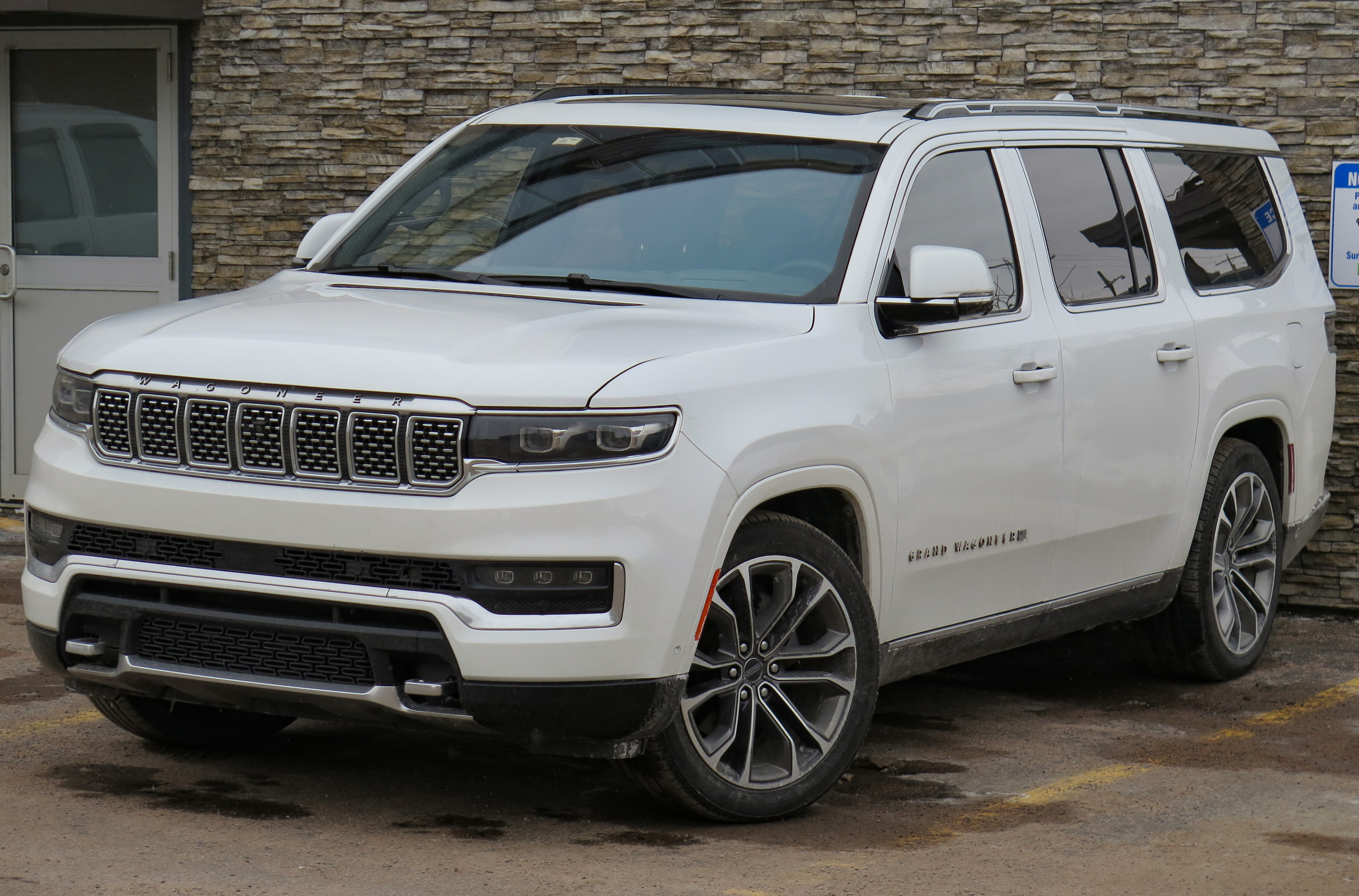
2023 Grand Wagoneer L Series III

At the 2022 New York International Auto Show (NYIAS), Jeep unveiled the extended-length 2023 Wagoneer L and Grand Wagoneer L, which are a foot longer than their Wagoneer and Grand Wagoneer counterparts. Trim level and feature content are expected to be the same as the Wagoneer and Grand Wagoneer, although both vehicles feature new 3.0-liter Hurricane twin-turbo inline-six (I6) gasoline engine.

The standard output version of this engine, used on the Wagoneer L models, produces 420 horsepower (313 kW; 426 PS) and 468 lb⋅ft (635 N⋅m; 65 kg⋅m) of torque. The high-output version of the "Hurricane" engine used on Grand Wagoneer and Grand Wagoneer L models produced 510 horsepower (380 kW; 517 PS) and 500 lb⋅ft (678 N⋅m; 69 kg⋅m) of torque from 2022 to 2024. The 2025 Grand Wagoneer and Grand Wagoneer L increased the power to 540 horsepower (403 kW; 547 PS) and 521 lb⋅ft (706 N⋅m; 72 kg⋅m).

== Powertrain ==
Model	Years	Engine	Power	Torque	0–60 mph
Wagoneer / Wagoneer L	2022–2023	5.7 L (350 cu in) Hemi eTorque V8	392 hp (397 PS; 292 kW) at 5600 rpm	404 lb⋅ft (548 N⋅m) at 3950 rpm	6.7 seconds
Wagoneer / Wagoneer L	2023–2025	3.0 L (180 cu in) Hurricane twin turbo I6	420 hp (426 PS; 313 kW) at 5200 rpm	468 lb⋅ft (635 N⋅m) at 3500 rpm	5.4 seconds
Grand Wagoneer / Grand Wagoneer L	2022–2023	6.4 L (392 cu in) Hemi V8	471 hp (478 PS; 351 kW) at 6000 rpm	455 lb⋅ft (617 N⋅m) at 4400 rpm	5.4 seconds
Grand Wagoneer / Grand Wagoneer L	2022–2024	3.0 L (180 cu in) Hurricane twin turbo I6	510 hp (517 PS; 380 kW) at 5700 rpm	500 lb⋅ft (678 N⋅m) at 3500 rpm	4.7 seconds
Grand Wagoneer / Grand Wagoneer L	2025	3.0 L (180 cu in) Hurricane twin turbo I6	540 hp (547 PS; 403 kW) at 6200 rpm	521 lb⋅ft (706 N⋅m) at 3500	4.6 seconds
Grand Wagoneer / Grand Wagoneer L	2026	3.0 L (180 cu in) Hurricane twin turbo I6	420 hp (426 PS; 313 kW) at 5200 rpm	468 lb⋅ft (635 N⋅m) at 3500 rpm	5.3 seconds

All versions use an 8-speed TorqueFlite 8HP75 automatic.

== Safety ==
The Wagoneer was the only model out of three most popular full-size SUVs in the U.S to be awarded "2024 Top Safety Pick" by IIHS. It excels in the small overlap crash test with maintaining survival space for the occupants, and the front and side curtain airbags worked correctly.

IIHS scores (2024)
Small overlap front	Good	
Moderate overlap front (Original Test)	Good	
Moderate overlap front (Updated Test)	Marginal	
Side (Updated Test)	Good	
Headlights (Varies by trim/option)	Good	Acceptable
Front crash prevention (Vehicle-to-Pedestrian)	Good	
Seatbelt reminders	Marginal	
Child seat anchors (LATCH) ease of use	Good+	

== Criticism ==
The Grand Wagoneer has faced criticism for its high price point, with some analysts questioning its competitiveness in the full-size luxury SUV market. Despite initial expectations, the vehicle has experienced sluggish sales; as of December 2024, reports indicated that over 100,000 units remained unsold, even as the broader automotive market showed signs of recovery. The model has also been subject to quality control concerns. In late 2024, the National Highway Traffic Safety Administration (NHTSA) launched an investigation into reports of Grand Wagoneer engines shutting off unexpectedly while operating at low speeds.

== Sales ==
Calendar year	United States			Canada		
Calendar year	Wagoneer	Grand Wagoneer	Total	Wagoneer	Grand Wagoneer	Total
2021	5,349	2,675	8,024	168	161	329
2022	36,219	11,736	47,955	1,631	930	2,561
2023	29,149	10,618	39,767	2,756	729	3,485
2024	43,125	11,959	55,084	1,197	537	1,734
2025	39,907	5,133	45,040	—N/a	983	983
