= List of Dodge concept vehicles =

List of concept vehicles from American brand

Dodge, a division of Stellantis, has produced a number of concept vehicles during its history.

== Concept vehicles ==
Image	Name	Year	Description
	Dodge Firearrow I	1953	A part of a series of concept cars designed by Ghia.
	Dodge Storm Z-250 Zeder	1953	A coupé designed by Gruppo Bertone.
	Dodge Firearrow II	1954	A part of a series of concept cars designed by Ghia.
	Dodge Firearrow III	1954	A part of a series of concept cars designed by Ghia.
	Dodge Firearrow IV	1954	A part of a series of concept cars designed by Ghia.
	Dodge Granada	1954	A convertible with a fiberglass body.
	Dodge Flitewing	1961	A coupé with flip-up windows rather than conventional roll-down windows.
	Dodge Turbo Dart	1962	A Dodge Dart with a gas turbine engine that was a part of the Chrysler gas turbine engine program.
	Dodge Turbo Truck	1962	A Dodge Power Giant with a gas turbine engine that was a part of the Chrysler gas turbine engine program.
	Dodge Charger	1964	A show car based on the Dodge Polara.
	Dodge Charger II	1965	A coupé previewing the first generation Dodge Charger.
	Dodge Deora	1967	A heavily-customized Dodge A100 designed by Harry Bentley Bradley.
	Dodge Charger III	1968	A coupé with a canopy door.
	Dodge Daroo I	1968	A show car based on a Dodge Dart.
	Dodge D-100 Scat Packer	1968	A modified Dodge D-100 used as a show car.
	Dodge Super Bee Convertible	1968	A convertible version of the Dodge Super Bee.
	Dodge Topless Charger	1968	A topless version of the second generation Dodge Charger
	Dodge Dart Swinger 340	1969	A show car based on the Dodge Dart.
	Dodge Daroo II	1969	A show car based on the Dodge Dart.
	Dodge Yellow Jacket	1969	A show car based on a Dodge Challenger.
	Dodge Challenger Special	1970	A coupé designed by Pietro Frua.
	Dodge Diamante	1970	A show car that superseded the Dodge Yellow Jacket.
	Dodge Super Charger	1970	A modified topless Dodge Charger with a nose cone.
	Dodge Mirada Magnum	1980	A coupé show car.
	Dodge M4S	1981–1988	A sports car prototype used as a pace car. It appeared in The Wraith. Only 4 were built.
	Dodge Turbo Charger	1981	A sports car prototype designed to be used as a pace car.
	Dodge Shelby Street Fighter	1983	A pickup based on a Dodge Rampage.
	Dodge Daytona 199x	1987	A coupé.
	Dodge Intrepid	1988	A mid-engine coupé. Some styling elements from it were later featured on the Dodge Stealth.
	Dodge Dakota Sport V8	1989	A pickup truck based on the first generation Dodge Dakota.
	Dodge Viper VM-01	1989	A roadster that previewed the Dodge Viper.
	Dodge Daytona R/T	1990	A coupé which had many of its styling elements later featured on the Dodge Daytona.
	Dodge LRT	1990	A small pickup truck.
	Dodge Neon	1991	An economically friendly sedan that featured recycled components.
	Dodge EPIC	1992	A battery electric minivan. The name was later used for electric fleet versions of the Dodge Caravan and Plymouth Voyager.
	Dodge Viper GTS	1993	A concept version of the Dodge Viper that later went into production.
	Dodge Aviat	1994	An experimental coupé based on the Dodge Neon designed to be aerodynamic.
	Dodge Venom	1994	A coupé built on a modified Chrysler PL platform.
	Dodge Caravan ESS	1996	A performance version of the Dodge Caravan aimed at enthusiasts.
	Dodge Intrepid ESX I	1996	A sedan that is a part of the Intrepid ESX series of prototypes designed to meet the demands of the consumer while also achieving 80 MPG.
	Dodge Copperhead	1997	A roadster originally designed as a slimmed-down Dodge Viper for those who could not afford one.
	Dodge Sidewinder	1997	A concept roadster utility that featured a V10 from a Dodge Viper.
	Dodge T-Rex	1997	A 6x6 version of the Dodge Ram.
	Dodge Intrepid ESX II	1998	A sedan that is a part of the Intrepid ESX series of prototypes and was dubbed a "mybrid" (mild hybrid).
	Dodge Big Red	1998	A version of the second generation Dodge Ram designed to haul.
	Dodge Caravan R/T	1999	A performance version of the Dodge Caravan aimed at enthusiasts.
	Dodge Charger R/T	1999	A sedan that took many styling elements from the original Dodge Charger.
	Dodge Power Wagon	1999	A concept pickup truck.
	Dodge MAXXcab	2000	A pickup truck designed with passenger comfort in mind.
	Dodge Viper	2000	A race car version of the Dodge Viper.
	Dodge Powerbox	2001	A hybrid SUV which demonstrated DaimlerChrysler's attempt to improve hybrid automobiles.
	Dodge Super 8 Hemi	2001	A sedan which featured design elements from Dodge's past vehicles and their SUVs and trucks.
	Dodge M80	2002	A pickup truck designed as a modern interpretation of Dodge trucks of the 1930s and 1940s.
	Dodge Razor	2002	A coupé designed by Razor as a partnership between Dodge.
	Dodge Avenger	2003	A fastback crossover SUV.
	Dodge Durango Hemi R/T	2003	An SUV that previewed the second generation Dodge Durango.
	Dodge Intrepid ESX	2003	A sedan that is a part of the Intrepid ESX series of prototypes and achieved 72 miles per gallon.
	Dodge Kahuna	2003	A minivan targeted at surfers.
	Dodge Magnum SRT-8	2003	A station wagon that previewed the Dodge Magnum.
	Dodge Tomahawk	2003	A non-street legal motorcycle originally intended as a one-off concept, but was later produced as a limited-production vehicle.
	Dodge Viper SRT-10 Carbon	2003	A highly tuned Dodge Viper in a coupé body style
	Dodge Dakota Warrior H.O.	2004	A prerunner-inspidered version of the Dodge Dakota
	Dodge Durango "Dude"	2004	A high performance pickup based on the Dodge Durango.
	Dodge "Hot Rod" Magnum	2004	A version of the Dodge Magnum designed after Chrysler's 1970s muscle cars.
	Dodge Slingshot	2004	A hardtop convertible targeted at a younger generation.
	Dodge Caliber	2005	A compact hatchback that was later put into production.
	Dodge Nitro	2005	An SUV that was later put into production.
	Dodge Avenger	2006	A sedan previewing the Dodge Avenger.
	Dodge Challenger	2006	A coupé previewing the third generation Dodge Challenger.
	Dodge Hornet	2006	A mini MPV planned to be introduced to the market in 2010, but cancelled due to the Great Recession combined with the Chrysler Chapter 11 reorganization.
	Dodge Rampage	2006	A concept pickup truck.
	Dodge Demon	2007	A roadster considered for production.
	Dodge Fantasticar	2007	A concept vehicle designed for Fantastic Four: Rise of the Silver Surfer.
	Dodge Avenger Stormtrooper	2008	An modified version of the Dodge Avenger.
	Dodge Challenger SRT10	2008	A version of the Dodge Challenger with an engine from a Dodge Viper.
	Dodge Challenger Targa	2008	A version of the Dodge Challenger designed as a competition car
	Dodge ZEO	2008	A battery-electric sport wagon featuring scissor doors.
	Trazo by Dodge	2008	A cancelled badge-engineered first generation Nissan Tiida sedan intended for the Mexican market.
	Dodge Circuit EV	2009	A battery-electric coupé based on a Lotus Europa S.
	Dodge Charger Juiced	2012	A high performance version of the seventh generation Dodge Charger.
	Dodge Dart Carbon Fire	2012	A performance version of the Dodge Dart.
	Dodge Challenger Mopar Drag Pak	2014	A version of the Dodge Challenger designed for drag racing.
	Dodge Challenger T/A	2014	A version of the Dodge Challenger that is a homage to the T/A package from the first generation Dodge Challenger.
	Dodge Challenger R/T Mopar	2014	A version of the seventh generation Dodge Charger featuring Mopar accessories.
	Dodge Viper ACR	2014	A track-focused version of the third generation Dodge Viper that was later produced.
	Dodge Dart R/T	2014	A performance version of the Dodge Dart.
	Dodge Charger Deep Stage 3	2015	A high performance version of the seventh generation Dodge Charger.
	Dodge Dart GLH	2015	A performance version of the Dodge Dart.
	Dodge Barracuda	2015	A Plymouth Barracuda inspired derivative of the Alfa Romeo Giulia (2015).
	Dodge Durango Shaker	2016	A high performance version of the third generation Dodge Durango.
	Dodge Shakedown Challenger	2016	A customized version of the first generation Dodge Challenger.
	Dodge Super Charger 1968	2018	A customized version of the second generation Dodge Charger.
	Dodge Charger Hellcat Widebody	2019	A widebody version of the Dodge Charger SRT Hellcat previewing the "Widebody Package" introduced in 2020.
	Dodge Charger Daytona SRT	2022	A coupé previewing the eighth generation Dodge Charger.
	Dodge Hornet GT GLH	2022	A performance version of the Dodge Hornet.
	Dodge Hornet R/T GLH	2023	A performance version of the Dodge Hornet.
