= Razor (disambiguation) =

A razor is a bladed tool used for removing unwanted body hair.

Razor may also refer to:

== Philosophy ==
- Philosophical razor, a principle or rule-of-thumb used to remove unlikely explanations for a phenomenon.

== Places ==
- Razor (mountain), Slovenia
- Razor, Texas, a community in the United States
- Razor Hill, a hill in Hong Kong
- Razor Point, South Georgia Island, Atlantic Ocean

== People ==
- Razor (nickname), a list of people
- Razor Ramon, a ring name of American professional wrestler Scott Hall (1958–2022)
- Razor Ramon HG, a ring name of Japanese professional wrestler Masaki Sumitani (born 1975)

== Arts and entertainment ==
- "Razor" (short story), by Vladimir Nabokov
- Razor (band), a Canadian thrash metal band formed in 1984
- "Razor", a song on the album In Your Honor by the Foo Fighters
- Battlestar Galactica: Razor, a television film
- Underbelly: Razor, a 2011 Australian television mini-series

== Products and companies ==
- Razor (scooter), a compact aluminum kick scooter
- Razor Entertainment, a trading cards and collectibles company based in Dallas, Texas
- Dodge Razor, a concept car introduced in 2002
- RazorUSA, a manufacturer of rideable toys

== Computing ==
- Razor (configuration management), Visible Systems software suite for configuration management and issue tracking
- Razor 1911, a software cracking, "warez", and computer demo group
- ASP.NET Razor, a programming syntax used to create dynamic web pages.
- Razor-qt, a free desktop environment for personal computers.
- Nexus 7 (2013) Android tablet, codename razor

== Fictional characters ==
- Razor (character), a superhero from the comic book series also titled "Razor"
- Hanzo the Razor, featured in a Japanese film trilogy
- Jake "Razor" Clawson, an anthropomorphic feline from the series SWAT Kats: The Radical Squadron
- Razor, from the 1987 computer game Maniac Mansion
- Razor, a character from the 1998 Manga Hunter x Hunter
- Razor (real name Clarence Callahan), the main rival character of the racing video game Need for Speed: Most Wanted
- Razor, a character in 2020 video game Genshin Impact

== Other uses ==
- Gillette Stadium, a sports stadium in Foxborough, Massachusetts, nicknamed "the Razor"
- Strata SE1, a tower in London, nicknamed "Razor"

== See also ==
- Razor clam (disambiguation)
- Motorola RAZR, a mobile phone
- RZA, U.S. rapper, member of the Wu-Tang Clan
- Razar (disambiguation)
- Razer (disambiguation)
- Rasor (disambiguation)
