= Freeman Thomas =

American automobile designer (born 1957)

Freeman Thomas (born August 20, 1957) is an American automobile and industrial designer who has worked for Porsche, Volkswagen Group, DaimlerChrysler and Ford.

== Background ==
Thomas, the son of an American military air traffic controller and a German mother, traveled frequently around Europe during his childhood. This led to an early awareness of cars - in his own words, "a certain sense of automotive space."

== Early career ==
After graduating from Art Center College of Design in Pasadena, California, Freeman worked as a senior designer at Porsche from 1983 to 1987.

After leaving Porsche, he worked in consultancy, journalism and teaching, before joining Volkswagen of America in 1991.

== Volkswagen Group ==
While at the Volkswagen Design Center in Simi Valley, California, he collaborated with fellow Art Center graduate J Mays on the design of the Volkswagen Concept 1 concept car, a modern re-interpretation of the original Volkswagen Beetle. This was first shown at the 1994 North American International Auto Show (NAIAS), and the positive response led to the car entering production as the Volkswagen New Beetle. In 1994, he began the design of the acclaimed Audi TT concept car, which also led to a production model.

From 1996 to 1999, Thomas was a member of J Mays' SHR Perceptual Management industrial design consultancy, before returning to Volkswagen of America as head of design.

== DaimlerChrysler ==
In 1999, Thomas was appointed vice president of DaimlerChrysler Advanced Product Design Strategy, later becoming head of their Pacifica Advanced Design Center in 2002. At DaimlerChrysler he oversaw the design of several Chrysler, Dodge and Jeep concept cars and production models.

== Ford ==
Thomas moved to the Ford Motor Company, taking up the role of Director, Strategic Design for North America on 1 June 2005. He is responsible for developing product design strategies and concept vehicles for the Ford (inclusive of the current Mustang design), Lincoln and Mercury marques.

== R Gruppe ==
Cris Huergas and Freeman Thomas of California founded R Gruppe, an early 911 Porsche sports club on May 15, 1999. They did so with the intention of bringing like-minded individual together to share technical and historical information related to their cars, as well as sharing views and ideas concerning the ownership, preparation, maintenance and operation of their cars.

== Designs ==
Thomas is credited with the following designs:

- Volkswagen New Beetle
- Audi TT
- Audi A4
- Audi A6
- Panoz Roadster
- Chrysler Pacifica
- Dodge Super 8 Hemi concept
- Jeep Willys concept
- Jeep Treo concept
- Dodge Sling Shot concept
- Jeep Rescue concept
- Dodge Tomahawk concept motorcycle
- With Ralph Gilles
  - Chrysler 300
  - Dodge Magnum
  - Dodge Charger
