= Treo =

Treo may refer to:

- Gillette Treo, a razor designed for caregivers to shave seniors and people with disabilities
- Jeep Treo, a 2003 electric concept car
- Palm Treo, a line of smartphones
- Total Rare Earth Oxides, a measurement of rare-earth oxides
- Treo (dog), recipient of the Dickin Medal
- Treo (drug), a painkiller

== See also ==
- Trio (disambiguation)
