= RZR =

RZR may refer to:

- Cleveland Regional Jetport (FAA airport code RZR), Tasso, Tennessee, USA; near Cleveland, Bradley County, Tennessee, USA
- Ramsar International Airport (IATA airport code RZR), Ramsar, Mazandaran, Iran
- Zephyr Express (ICAO airline code RZR); see List of airline codes (Z)
- Polaris RZR, a sport side-by-side offroad vehicle
- Razor 1911 (also "RZR"), a Norwegian warez demo group
- RZR (eSports team), from Razer Inc.
- RZR is a rebranding of the company Aarki which was then acquired by Skillz (company)

== See also ==
- Razer (disambiguation)
- Razor (disambiguation)
- Razr
