= Envi =

Envi or ENVI may refer to:

- Standing Committee on Environment and Sustainable Development (ENVI) in the Canadian Parliament
- ENVI is an acronym for the European Parliament Committee on the Environment, Public Health and Food Safety
- Envi (automobile), a defunct Chrysler division to develop hybrid and full electric vehicles.
- ENVI (software), a geospatial imagery analysis and processing application

== See also ==
- Envy
