= Razar (disambiguation) =

Razar is a tehsil of Khyber Pakhtunkhwa, Pakistan.

Razar may also refer to:

- Razar (DC Comics) known as 'The Changeling', fictional enemy of The Flash in DC Comics
- Razar (Teenage Mutant Ninja Turtles), character in Teenage Mutant Ninja Turtles
- Razar (Legends of Chima), a character in Legends of Chima
- Razar (Australian band), punk band from Brisbane, Australia, active from 1977 to 1979 (see Brisbane punk rock)
- Razar (English band), late 1970s London punk band including Grant Stevens

== See also ==
- Razor (disambiguation)
- Razer (disambiguation)
- Rasor (disambiguation)
- Rezar, wrestler
