= Razor (scooter) =

Model of scooter

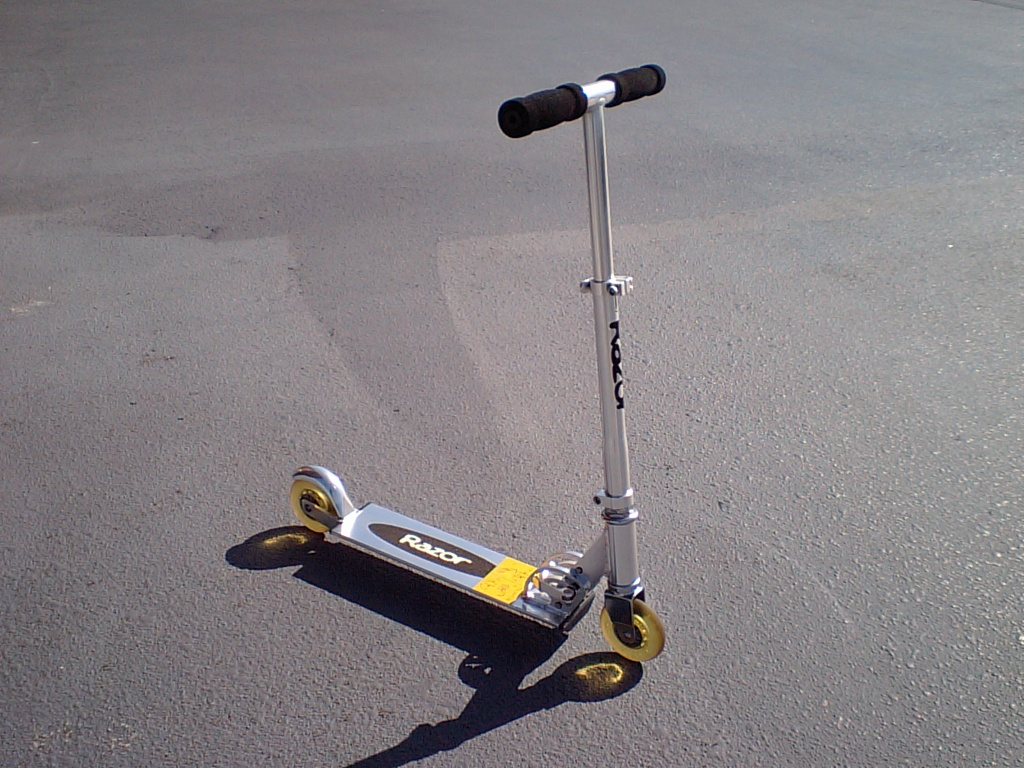
Razor A Model 1st generation, the first Razor scooter aka Old A

The Razor Scooter is a compact folding scooter developed by Micro Mobility Systems and manufactured by JD Corporation. Over 5 million units were sold in the six months following the launch of the first Razor scooter in 2000, and it was named as Spring/Summer Toy of the Year that same year. The first electric Razor scooter was released in 2003. The Razor has since been manufactured by RazorUSA, based in Cerritos, California, in the United States.

== Design ==
The basic scooter design consists of an aluminum frame, 98 mm polyurethane wheels, and a hinged fender over the rear wheel, which is pushed down by the foot to act as a spoon brake. The handlebar and headtube fold for carriage when a quick release latch is opened.

=== Models ===
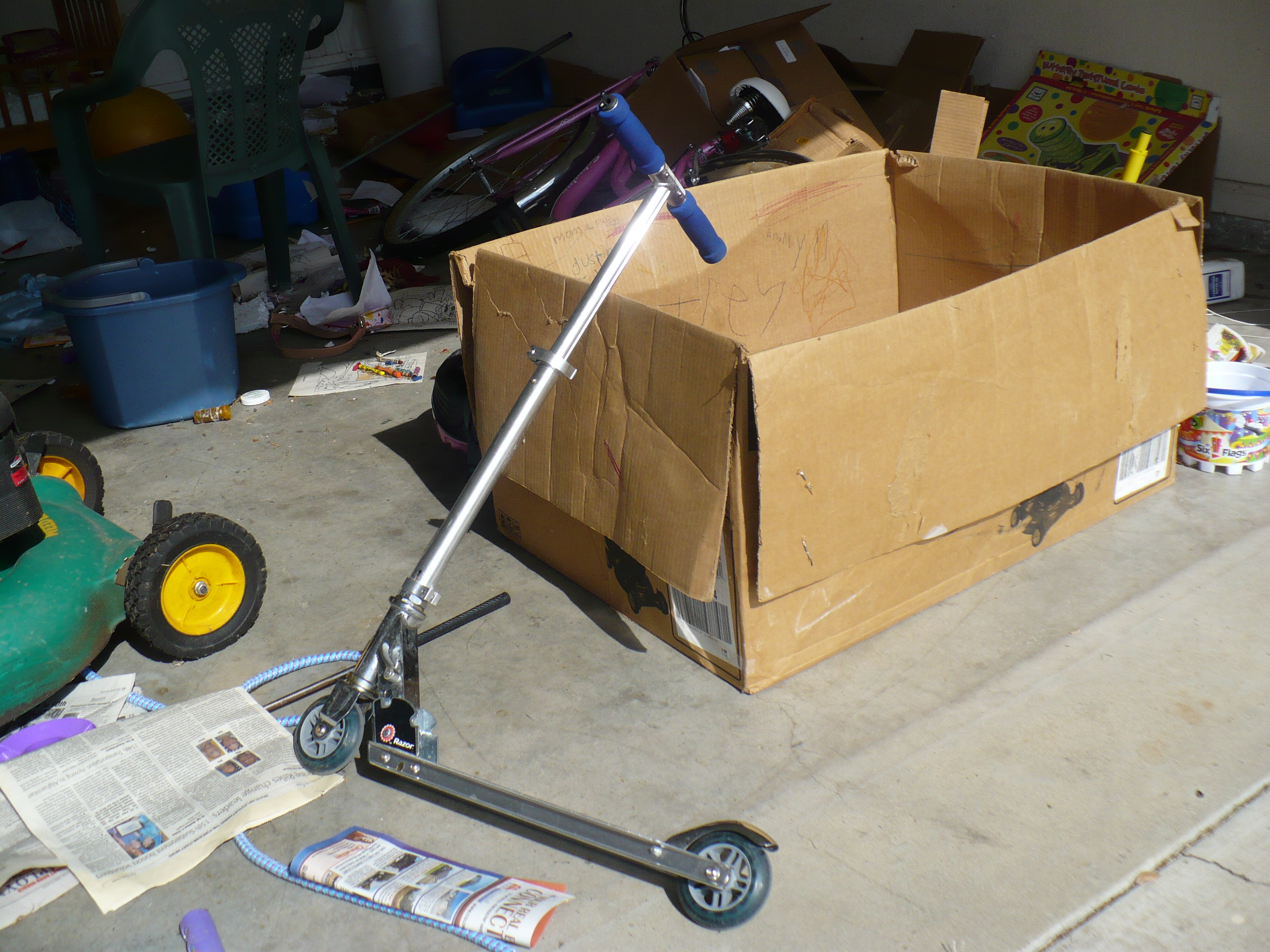
Razor A Model 2nd generation, aka New A

- A - 98mm wheels
- S - "A" with fixed-height handle bars (no height adjustment)
- AW - "A" with a wheelie bar
- Spark - "A" with a spark bar for real spark action from the rear brake
- A2 - "A" with a front suspension and a wheelie bar
- A3 - extended A2, early versions have 98mm wheels and later ones have 125mm wheels
- AW125 - extended A3 with 125mm wheels, upgrade to the early versions of the A3
- A5 Lux - 200mm wheels
- Non-Pro Model - the non-stunt model
- Ultra Pro - for stunts, not foldable
- Cruiser - 140mm wheels
- Malibu Cruiser - cruiser but with 125mm wheels and a metal deck
- Finger Crusher - lightweight design, Dan Green Pro Model

== Electric scooters ==
In 2003, RazorUSA introduced its first electric Razor scooter. It operates with the use of a twisting throttle. These new models reach speeds up to 15 miles per hour. Electric scooters became a popular way to travel slightly longer distances than one might with a traditional Razor scooter, yet distances short enough that using a bike would be excessive.

== Freestyle riding ==
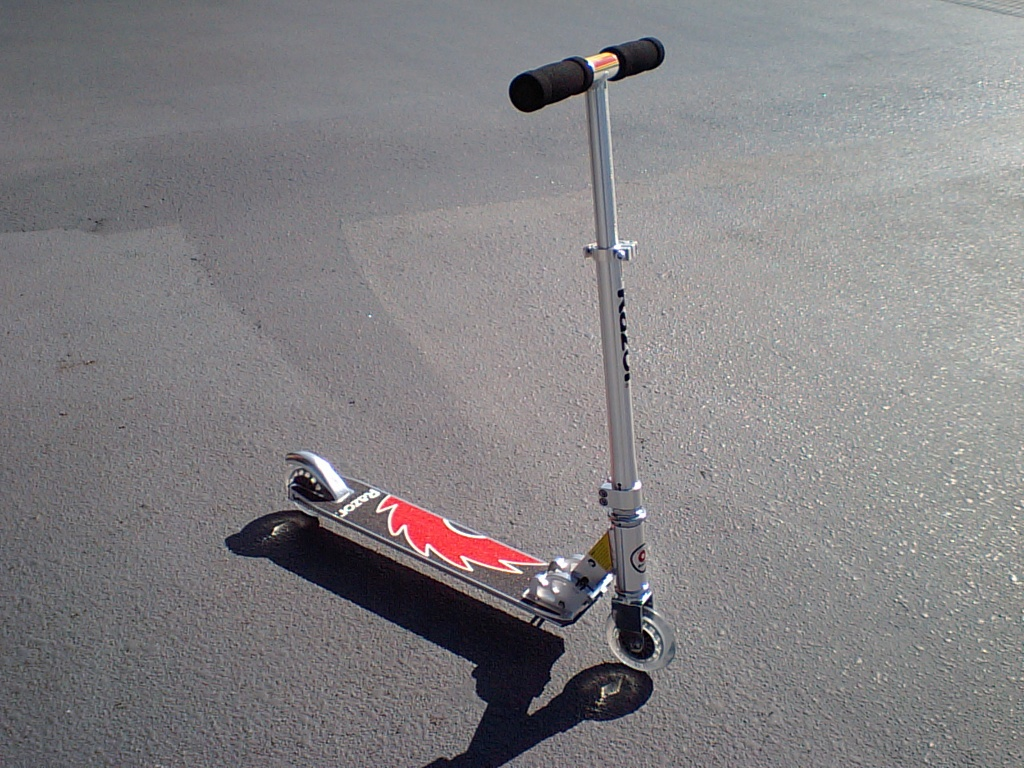
Razor Pro Model

Freestyle scootering is a growing sport. Due to the rough demands of trick riding, people often reinforce the scooter to withstand impacts and high force.

== Safety ==
Razor scooters have received attention for the frequency of injuries sustained by riders. In 2014, The Atlantic and other news outlets reported that Razor and other brands of scooters contributed to substantial increases in yearly numbers of emergency room visits.

Razor claims their scooters are safe to ride, and recommends adult supervision and the use of protective gear when riding. To increase the safety of younger riders, razor recommends a three wheeled scooter.

== Team Razor ==
Team Razor is an exhibition scooter team sponsored by Razor. This team of professionals travels across the U.S., wowing crowds with their tricks and talents, and appeared at X Games Los Angeles 2013. In October 2013 they completed the Team Razor Cross Country Tour, visiting 17 states as well as the District of Columbia. The team held their most recent exhibition event on August 30, 2014 at the 3rd Annual Triple Crown.

=== Current roster ===
Name	Age	Hometown	Joined team
Graham Kimbell	23	Harby, UK	2012
Jason Beggs	26	Long Beach, CA	2010
John Radtke	29	Pomona, CA	2006
Michael Pytel	23	Newport, DE	2012
Nat Barber	23	Stratford upon Avon	2012
Big Ron Sharpe	29	Elk Grove, CA	2008
Royce King	22	Glenbrook, Blue Mountains, Australia	2011
Tanner Markley	28	Temple City, CA	2010
Trevor Navarre	18	Mission Viejo, CA	2012
