= Rasor =

Rasor may refer to:

- Rasor Off-Highway Vehicle Area, in the Mohave Desert, California
- Rasor Airport, former name of Avoca Airport, a privately owned airport in Michigan
- Rasor Elementary School, Plano, Texas

== See also ==
- Razor (disambiguation)
- Razer (disambiguation)
- Razar (disambiguation)
