= Razer =

Razer may refer to:

== People ==
- Greg Razer, American politician
- Helen Razer (born 1968), Australian radio presenter and writer

=== Fictional characters ===
- Razer, a character in SWAT Kats: The Radical Squadron
- Razer (DC Comics), a main character in Green Lantern: The Animated Series who also appears in the fourth season of Young Justice

== Businesses and brands ==
- Razer Inc., a Singaporean-American computer peripherals manufacturer
- MTV2 (Canadian TV channel), a Canadian digital television specialty service that was branded Razer from 2005 to 2008

== Other uses ==
- Razer (robot), a contestant on the series Robot Wars
- Razer Airport, airport serving Koran va Monjan, Badakhshan, Afghanistan
- "Razer" (The Cape), a 2011 television episode

== See also ==
- Razor (disambiguation)
- Razar (disambiguation)
- Rasor (disambiguation)
- RZR (disambiguation)
