= Razor (nickname) =

Razor or The Razor is the nickname of:

- Junior Farzan Ali (born 1980), Fijian boxer and WBF Asia Pacific lightweight champion
- Sergiy Dzinziruk (born 1976), Ukrainian boxer and former WBO Super Welterweight champion
- Scott Hall (born 1958), a professional wrestler who came to prominence under the ring name "Razor Ramon"
- Daryl Reaugh (born 1965), ice hockey color commentator
- Donovan Ruddock (born 1963), Canadian retired heavyweight boxer
- Neil Ruddock (born 1968), English retired footballer
- Jim Sharp (bull rider) (born 1965), retired professional bull rider
- Noel "Razor" Smith (born 1960), English writer and reformer robber
- William Charles Razor Smith (1877–1946), English cricketer

== See also ==
- Razor (disambiguation)
