= Hernando Téllez =

Colombian journalist and author (1908–1966)

- Born: March 22, 1908; Bogotá, Colombia
- Died: 1966 (aged 57–58)
- Occupations: Journalist, author, writer
- Known for: Author of Just Lather and Nothing Else

Hernando Téllez (22 March 1908 – 1966) was a Colombian journalist and writer. Born and educated in Bogotá, Téllez entered very early the world of journalism, with which he is primarily identified, having been on the staff of some of Colombia's most popular newspapers and magazines. It was not until 1950 with the publication of his short story collection Cenizas para el viento (Ashes for the Wind), that his name became more widely known. His tragicomic tales evidence his keen and extremely sensitive observations of contemporary life and, more particularly, the anguishing reality of his native country.

== Career ==
During Téllez's lifetime, Colombia suffered through several civil wars and military dictatorships, collectively called La Violencia ("The Violence"). Téllez was also a student of history and was aware of the three rebellions of the 19th century which caused the former nation of Gran Colombia to be divided into the separate countries of Colombia, Venezuela and Ecuador. Téllez served in the Congress of Colombia.

Possibly the most famous work by Téllez is his short story "Espuma y nada más" ("Lather and Nothing Else", or "Just Lather, That's All"). The story is widely read by American high school students learning Spanish, and depicts the inner conflict of a barber and secret rebel spy who is shaving the captain of a military unit which has tracked and executed members of a local resistance organization. The barber vacillates between thoughts of slitting the captain's throat with his razor and giving him the expert shave for which he is known. In the end the barber decides he does not want to be stained in blood, but only in soap lather, or "espuma y nada más". As the captain leaves, he reveals that he heard that the barber would kill him and that his visit was to see if this was true.

== Stories ==
- "Espuma y nada más" ("Lather and Nothing Else" or "Just Lather, That's All")
- Ashes for the Wind and Other Stories

== See also ==
- "Razor", a short story by Vladimir Nabokov that is very similar to Espuma y nada más
