= Envi (automobile) =

Short-lived Chrysler electric vehicle division (2007-2009)

ENVI
- Company type: Division
- Industry: Automotive
- Founded: 2007
- Defunct: November 2009; 16 years ago
- Fate: Dissolved
- Headquarters: Auburn Hills, Michigan, United States
- Area served: U.S.
- Products: Electric-Drive Vehicles
- Parent: Chrysler

ENVI was a division of American automobile manufacturer Chrysler formed in 2007 to create electric-drive vehicles and related advanced-propulsion technologies.

== Birth and dissolution ==
Chrysler announced the formation of ENVI in September 2007. It was headed by Lou Rhodes who had formerly been in charge of "Advance Vehicle Concepts and Innovation" at Chrysler Group LLC. The group was dedicated solely to creating production vehicles, and not basic engineering research. "ENVI" was derived from "ENvironment" and "New Vehicles."

Chrysler's new owner Fiat SpA disbanded the division in November 2009, removed the three ENVI models from its 5-year plan for Chrysler, and Chrysler announced Lou Rhodes will become the group line executive in charge of electric car development for both Fiat and Chrysler. The first electric vehicle planned from Fiat-Chrysler is an electrified Fiat Doblò light commercial van.

== Planned products ==
In September 2008, ENVI revealed three "production intent" electric vehicles to the public and announced that Chrysler Group LLC would start bringing a portfolio of electric vehicles to showrooms in 2010. The vehicles were the electric-only Dodge EV sports car (based on the Lotus Europa S), the range-extended Chrysler EV minivan (two examples: one on static display, based on the Chrysler Town & Country, and a running development mule based on the Mercedes B-Class), and the range-extended Jeep EV (based on the Jeep Wrangler JK Unlimited, running rear-wheel-drive only). All used advanced lithium-ion batteries, and the two range-extended models had a small gasoline engine to power an electric generator, providing a claimed all-electric range of 40 miles (64 km) and an extended range of 400 miles (640 km). At the time Chrysler said it was investigating in-wheel motors and dual battery chemistries. In addition, a neighborhood electric vehicle named the PeaPod based on the existing GEM was announced.

The ENVI group announced it was also creating a new hybrid vehicle from "the ground up", designed in the same manner as the Toyota Prius and Honda Insight.

== See also ==
- Dodge Circuit EV
- Chrysler 200C EV
- Chrysler Town & Country EV
- Jeep Wrangler EV
- Jeep Patriot EV
- Global Electric Motorcars
