= Dodge MAXXcab =

Overview
- Manufacturer: Dodge
- Production: 2000

Body and chassis
- Class: Concept car
- Body style: 4-door SUT

Powertrain
- Engine: 4.7 L Magnum V8
- Transmission: Multi-speed electronic automatic

The Dodge MAXXcab was a four-door sport utility pickup truck concept car developed by Dodge. Unveiled at the 2000 Detroit Auto Show, it was billed by Dodge as a "Passenger Priority Truck".

It shared styling cues from other vehicles in the Dodge and Chrysler line up, and is based on a modified Dodge Dakota chassis. It featured nimble, sedan-like handling, a shortened utility bed, and a minivan style interior with seating for five passengers, the rear bench having built in child seats.

It was powered by 4.7L Magnum V8 producing 238 hp (177 kW) and 295 lb⋅ft (400 N⋅m) of torque mated to a multi-speed electronic automatic transmission. It accelerates from 0–60 mph (0–97 km/h) in 7.7 seconds and reaching a top speed of 114 mph (183 km/h).

While not intended for production, the MAXXcab did showcase features that were to be found on subsequent Dodge products, such as the idea of making a pickup truck more centered on the passengers was utilized in the Dodge Ram Mega Cab, which was available starting in the 2006 model year.
