= Dodge Charger III =

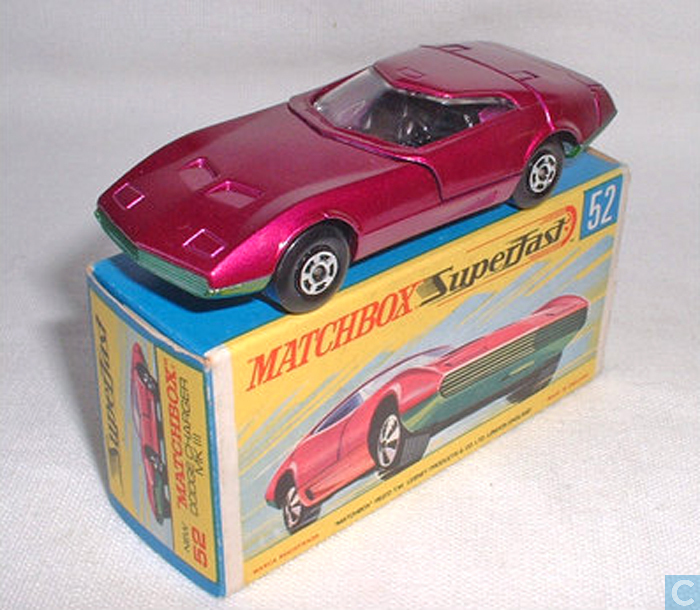
- Dodge Charger MkIII by Matchbox

Overview
- Manufacturer: Dodge
- Model years: 1968
- Designer: Jim Ebejer

Body and chassis
- Class: Concept car

Dimensions
- Wheelbase: 381 mm (15 in)
- Length: 4,674 mm (184 in)
- Width: 1,854 mm (73 in)
- Height: 1,067 mm (42 in)

The Dodge Charger III (or Charger 3) is a 1968 Dodge concept car.

Standing 42 in (110 cm) tall and measuring 73 in (190 cm) wide and 184 in (470 cm) long overall, the Charger III resembles a 1972 Sting Ray or a Hot Wheels car, with a pronounced Kammback. It used 15 in (38 cm) wheels and 8 in × 15 in (20 cm × 38 cm) front and 8.2 in × 15 in (21 cm × 38 cm) rear Super Stock racing tires.

The car seated two, in bucket seats, under a flip-up canopy with fixed windows, supported by struts when open. The steering wheel and instrument cluster swung aside to allow entry, while the seats elevated and lowered (by 8 in (20 cm)) to ease access. The wheel and instrument cluster was from a 1968 Dodge Charger. Air was admitted to the cockpit through vents at the windshield base.

The engine bay would accept any Dodge V8, including the 426.

The exhaust exited through rectangular outlets under the rear lights, at the center of the car. The windshield was very steeply raked, and the hood had inlet vents. The deck had a small access door at the extreme rear. Headlights are hidden.

The car never entered production.

The body design was used in Funny Car by Al "Flying Dutchman" Vanderwoude in 1970.

== Dodge Charger III in miniature ==
A model of the Dodge Charger III was produced by Lesney Products as No 52 in the Matchbox 1-75 series from 1970 until its deletion in 1975.
