= Dodge Venom =

Concept car developed by Dodge

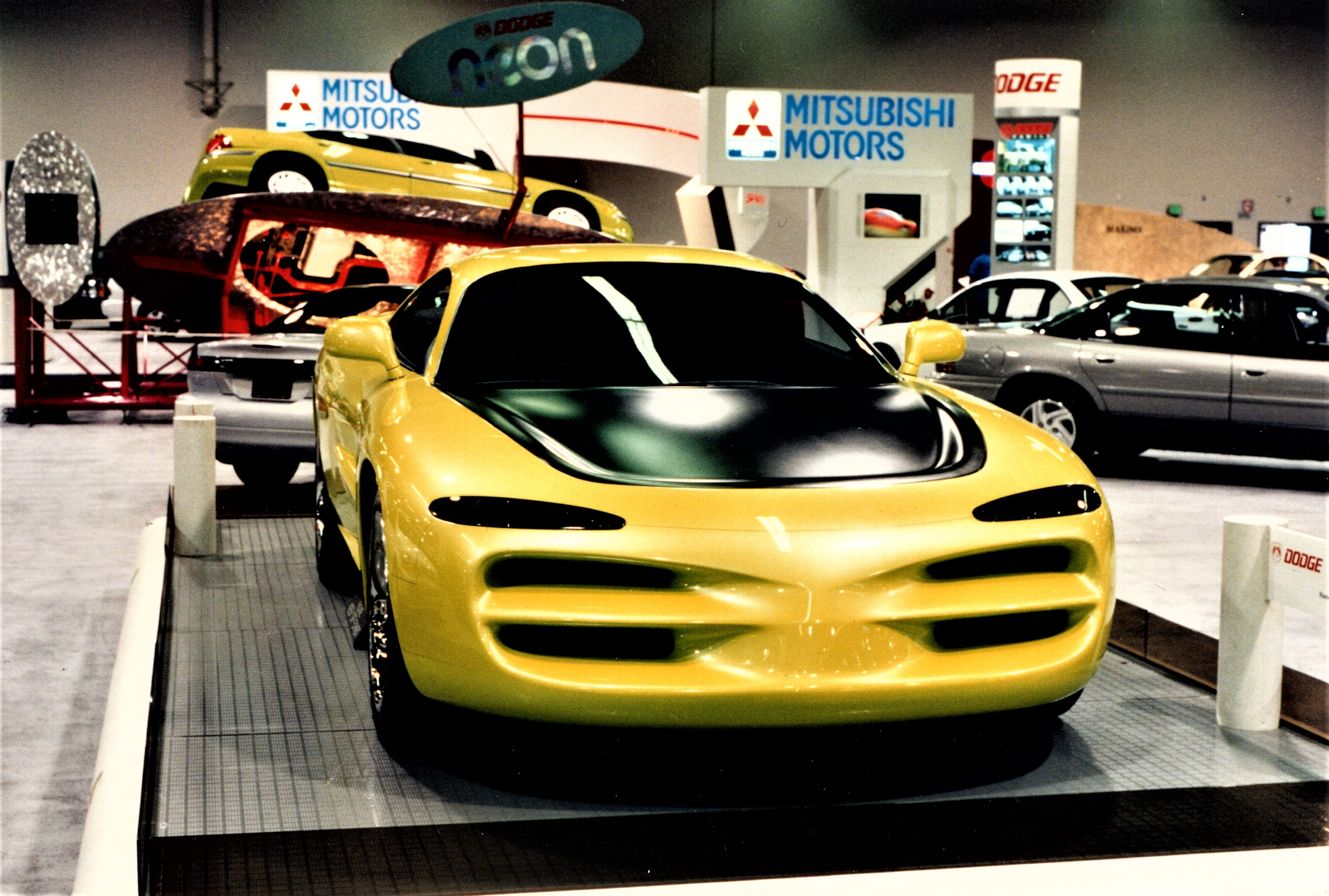

Overview
- Manufacturer: Dodge
- Production: 1994

Body and chassis
- Class: Concept car
- Body style: 2-door coupé
- Layout: FR
- Platform: Chrysler PL platform

Powertrain
- Engine: 3.5L EGE SOHC V6
- Power output: 245 hp (183 kW)
- Transmission: 6-speed manual

Dimensions
- Wheelbase: 106 in (2,692 mm)
- Length: 182.6 in (4,638 mm)
- Width: 74.9 in (1,902 mm)
- Height: 51.5 in (1,308 mm)

The Dodge Venom was a concept car that was produced in 1994 by the American automaker Dodge. The car was built on a modified version of the Chrysler PL platform that was used in the Dodge Neon. The car was designed to showcase Dodge's Cab-Forward design in a two-seat sports car package. Although based on the Neon, the upgraded V6 engine and rear wheel drive set gave this car a sports appeal. The car featured a 3.5-liter, overhead-cam, 24-valve V6 engine that was able to put out 245 hp (183 kW) and 221 lb⋅ft (300 N⋅m) of torque at 2,800 rpm. It was debuted along with two other concept cars on January 3, 1994. The car was projected to cost $8,975, $13,000 "fully loaded".

== Design ==
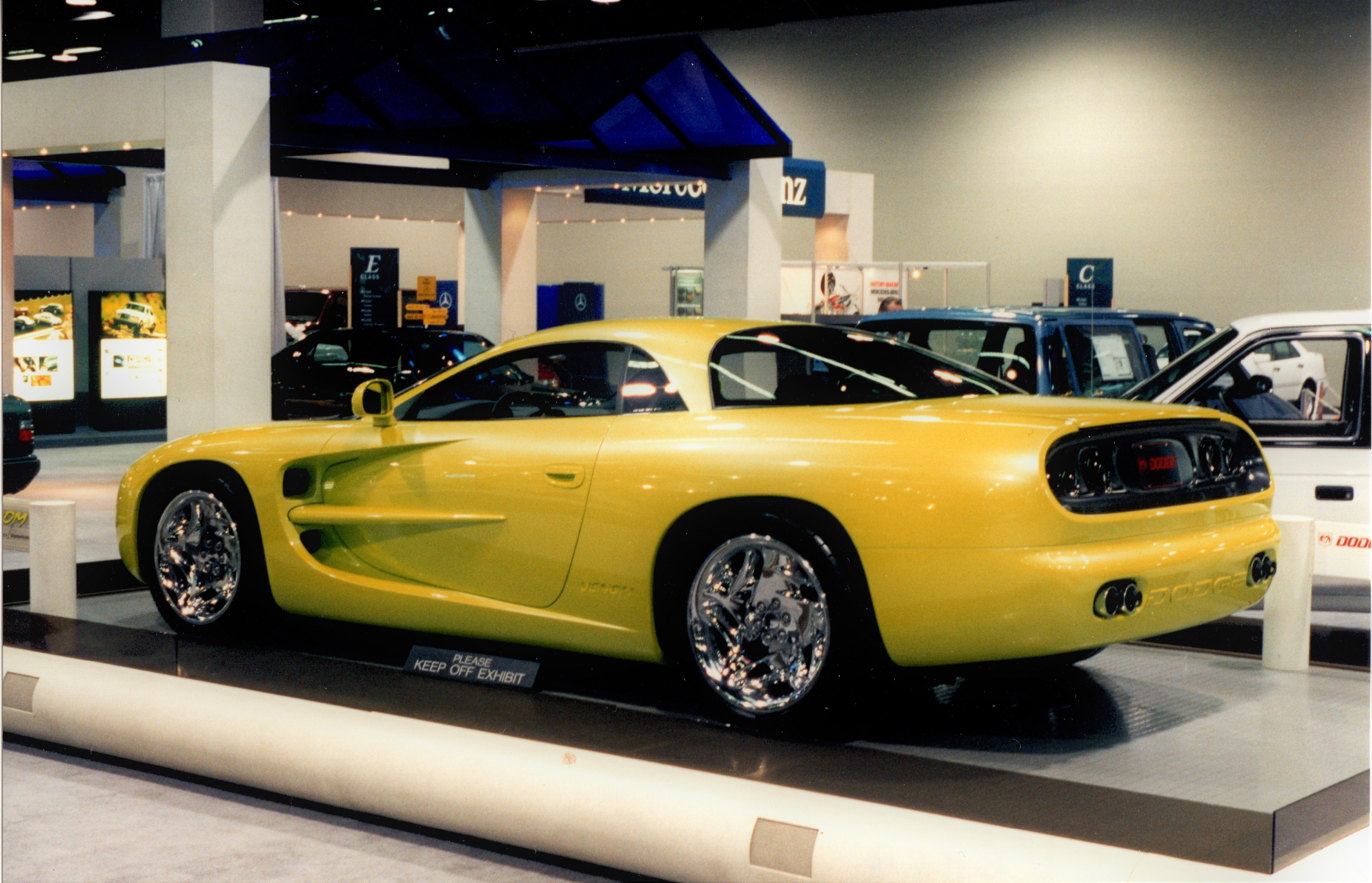
Rear view

Built from all steel, with an aluminum structure, and a cantilever roofline, the aforementioned Cab-Forward design allowed the car to be more aerodynamic, and roomy. The engine block was made of cast iron, and featured carbon fiber and Kevlar aramid fiber components. The design was based on another Dodge performance SRT car, The Viper. The car was optimized for performance on race courses, and could go from 0 to 60 mph (97 km/h) in 5.2 seconds. The front and rear utilized a double A-arm suspension setup, featured up-to-date four-wheel anti-lock disc brakes, and 245-millimeter tires. The front tires were 19 inches and the rear tires were 20 inches The wheels were moved towards the corners in the model, which increased both the wheel base and the track. This allowed for more agile handling. The car was only released with a neon yellow green pearl exterior with a black hood. The car also featured a quad exhaust set up, which makes the car louder. The car also featured parts from other cars such as the old Coronet handle-bar grille, the Viper side scoop, and the Challenger and Barracuda rear end. The car weighs about 2,700 pounds, which is lighter compared to older versions of muscle cars, which weighed around 3,700 pounds. The length of the car was 13.4 inches longer, 3.5 inches lower, and 7.5 inches higher than other subcompact cars of the time.

== Popularity ==
The car was popular with car enthusiasts, being featured in the international auto circuit for years. Usually a concept car's popularity does not last for years, but only weeks. However, the car never made it into production. This concept was one of the first attempts at making a modern muscle car, however, because it never made it into production, the first modern muscle car to be produced by Dodge was the Dodge Challenger in 2008.

== Specifications ==
=== 1994 ===
- Suspension: front and rear independent, double A-arms
- Brakes: four-wheel disc with ABS
- Front track: 63.7 inches
- Rear track: 65.3 inches
- Front tires: P245/45R19
- Rear tires: P245/45R20
