= Jeep Treo =

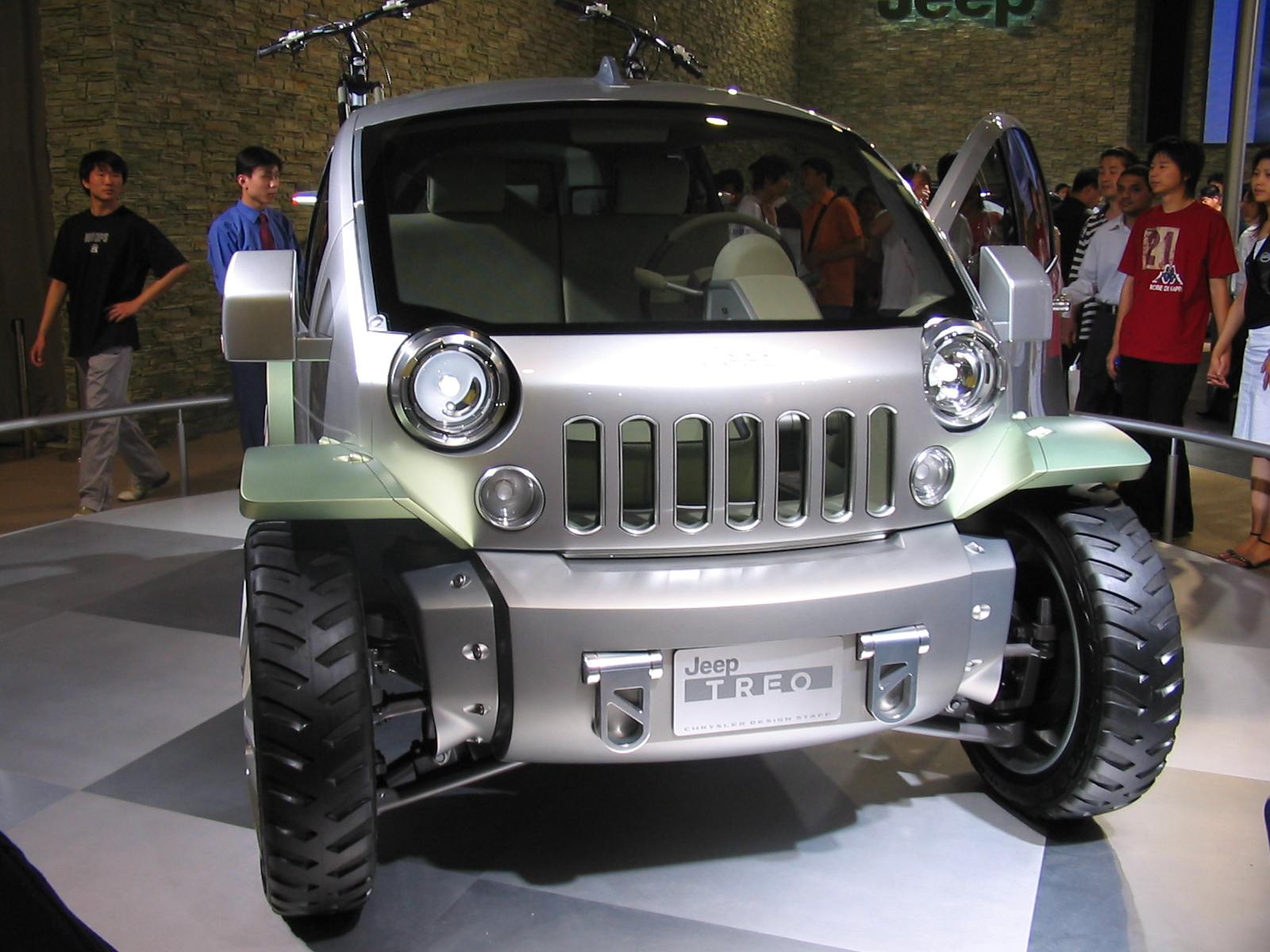

Overview
- Model years: 2003
- Designer: Freeman Thomas

Body and chassis
- Class: Mini sport utility vehicle
- Layout: Four-wheel drive

Powertrain
- Electric motor: 2
- Hybrid drivetrain: Hydrogen fuel cell

Dimensions
- Wheelbase: 2,450 mm (96.5 in)
- Length: 3,235 mm (127.4 in)
- Width: 1,680 mm (66.1 in)
- Height: 1,585 mm (62.4 in)
- Curb weight: 816 kg (1,799 lb)

The Jeep Treo was an electric concept car produced by Chrysler under their Jeep brand in the early twenty first century. Launched at the 2003 Tokyo Motor Show, it was envisaged for production in 2008, but the single prototype remained a one-off. Designed for the Asian young urban driver, the car was fitted with three seats and had the provision to carry mountain bikes as an integral part of the near-teardrop shaped design. Although the prototype was designed to be powered by a hydrogen fuel cell, in its production form the car was to be given hybrid petrol-electric drive.

== Design ==
Designed by the Chrysler Advanced Product Design Center in California by a team led by designer Freeman Thomas, the Jeep Treo was envisaged as "the ultimate student car" to attract young urban drivers. The car was designed to appeal to a younger audience than others in the Jeep range, it being expected that they would then move onto the more traditional models as they aged. It had a wheelbase of 2,450 mm (96.5 in) and the body was 3,235 mm (127.4 in) long, 1,680 mm (66.1 in) wide and 1,585 mm (62.4 in) high. It weighed 816 kg (1,799 lb). Power was provided by two electric motors, one mounted on each axle, to give four-wheel drive, driven by a hydrogen fuel cell mounted under the floor, to offer a zero-emissions vehicle.

The design was inspired by anime concepts. The exterior was in the shape of a near-teardrop with an open grille at the front. The interior was designed to be light and airy with a large windshield and glass roof extending over the rear cargo space. The cabin had two seats forward with a single foldable seat behind, and the ability to carry two mountain bikes at the back. The bike mountings were integral to the design to emphasise that the car was envisioned for use by the more active city-dweller. The car was designed to use drive by wire to eliminate the need for heavy and bulky mechanical components, while the driver's controls were modular so that the car could be easily switched from left to right hand drive.

== Production ==
The Jeep Trio was produced to appeal to the young urban market in Asia and was unveiled at the 2003 Tokyo Motor Show. The design was promoted as a vision of urban driving “a decade or more” in the future. The concept car was well received by motor journalists and a production vehicle was planned powered by a petrol/electric hybrid drivetrain to be launched by 2008. However, the vehicle remained a one-off build.

== See also ==
- List of fuel cell vehicles
- List of hybrid vehicles
