= Dodge EV =

American concept car

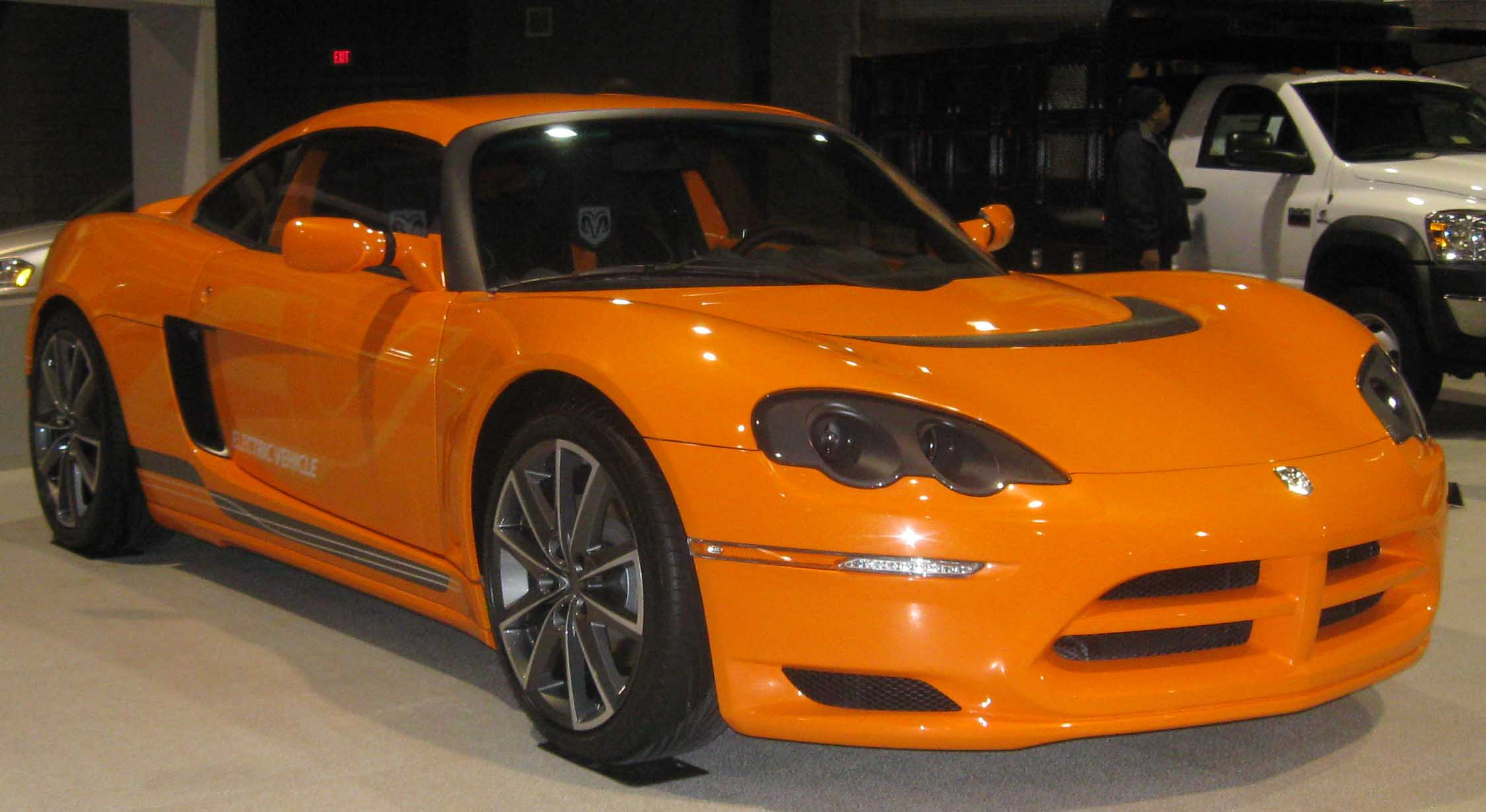

Overview
- Manufacturer: Dodge (Chrysler)
- Also called: Dodge Circuit EV; Dodge Circuit

Body and chassis
- Class: Concept car Sports car (S)
- Body style: 2-door coupé
- Layout: Rear mid-motor, rear-wheel drive
- Related: Lotus Europa S; Tesla Roadster

Powertrain
- Electric motor: 200 kW (270 hp) AC induction motor
- Transmission: Single speed BorgWarner fixed gear
- Battery: lithium-ion

Dimensions
- Wheelbase: 2,330 mm (91.7 in)
- Length: 3,900 mm (153.5 in)
- Width: 1,714 mm (67.5 in)
- Height: 1,150 mm (45.3 in)

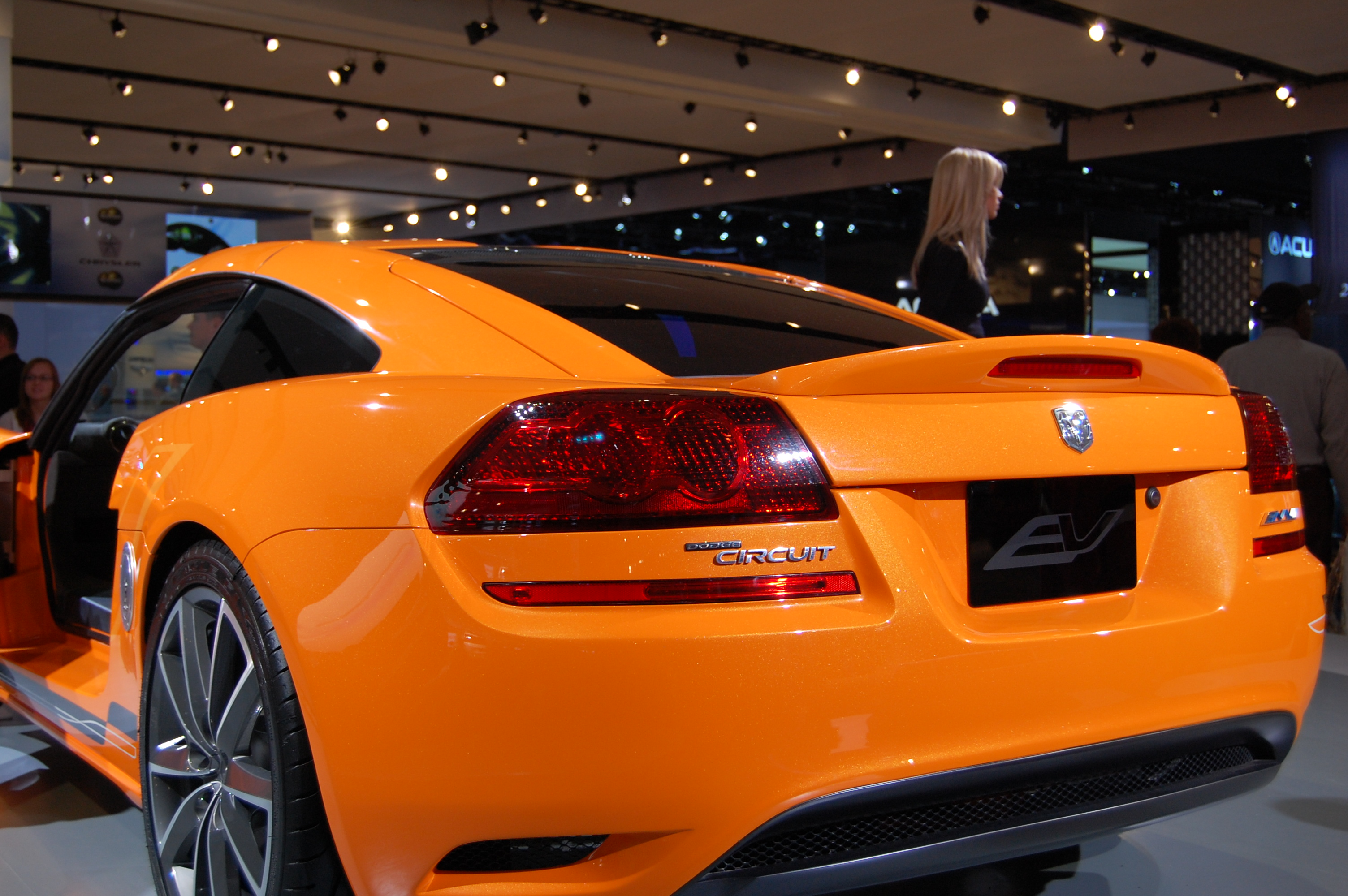
The Dodge EV at the 2009 North American International Auto Show.

The Dodge EV concept car, also called Dodge Circuit EV sports car, was a two-passenger, rear-wheel-drive, all-electric sports car shown to the public at the 2009 North American International Auto Show by Dodge.

The car was based on the Lotus Europa S, and combined a lithium-ion battery pack with a 200 kW (270 hp) electric motor, capable of 480 lb⋅ft (651 N⋅m) of torque.

Dodge claimed that the Dodge EV had a driving range of 150–200 miles (240–320 km), approaching the range and performance of the all-electric Tesla Roadster, which is built on the same chassis. According to Dodge, the Dodge EV could be recharged in eight hours using a standard 120 V outlet, or in only four hours using a 240 V outlet, the type commonly used for electric ovens and dryers.

Dodge unveiled the working prototypes of this all-electric vehicle and announced plans to bring it to market in the United States by 2010. But in May 2009 Autocar claimed the project was cancelled and in November Fiat SpA disbanded Chrysler's ENVI electric car division and dropped its models from future product plans.
