= Dodge M4S =

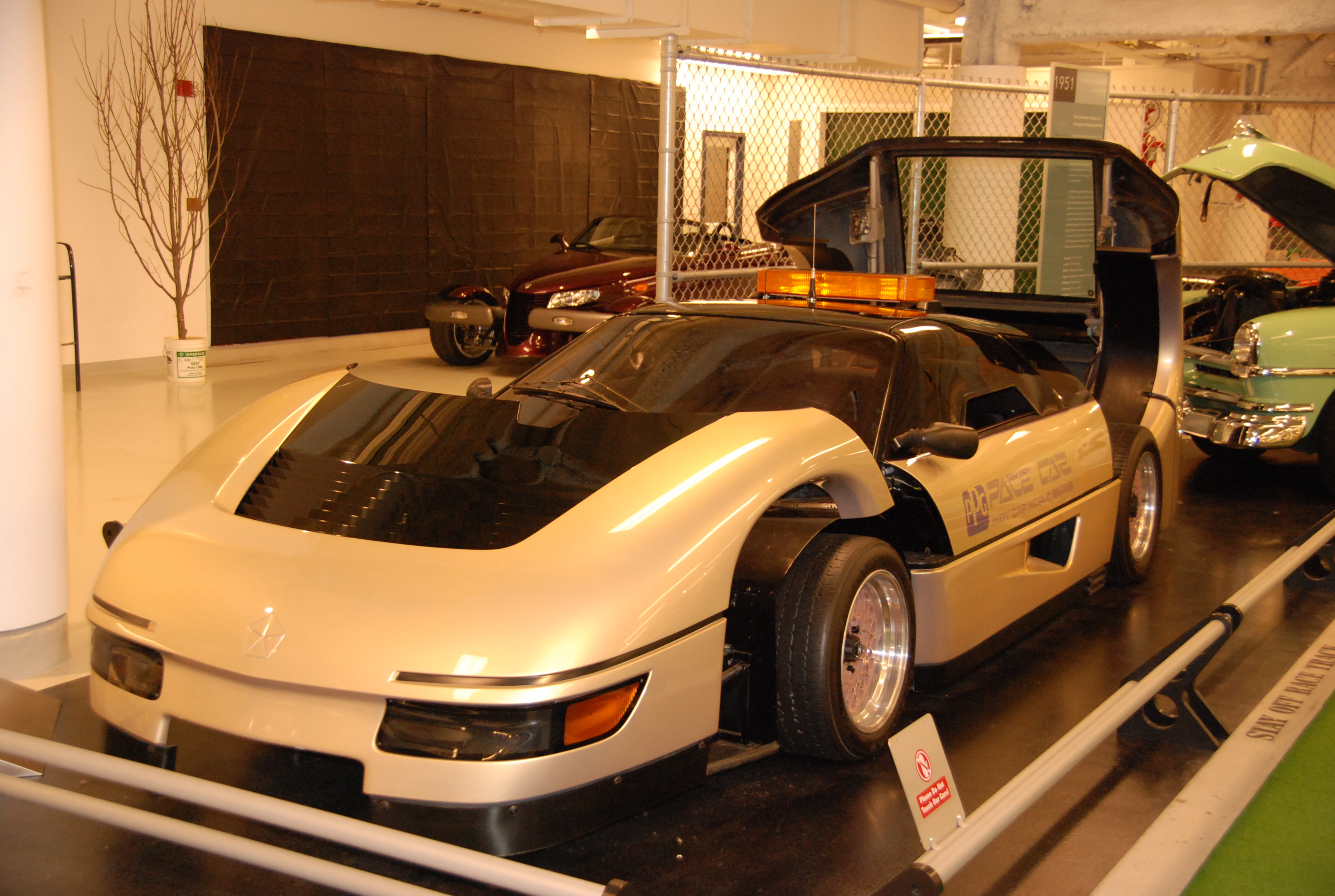

Overview
- Manufacturer: Dodge
- Also called: Dodge M4S Turbo Interceptor PPG Pace Car
- Production: 1981-1987 (4 functional units built, 5 non-functional units built)
- Assembly: United States: Troy, Michigan
- Designer: Bob Ackerman

Body and chassis
- Class: Sports coupe
- Body style: 2-door coupe
- Layout: Mid-engine, rear-wheel drive

Powertrain
- Engine: 2.198-litre (134.1 cu in) Cosworth-headed 16-valve DOHC I4 w/ dual Garrett T25 turbochargers
- Power output: 440 bhp (446 PS; 328 kW); 400 lb⋅ft (542 N⋅m)
- Transmission: Liberty-modified Chrysler five-speed transaxle

Dimensions
- Wheelbase: 100.3 in (2,548 mm)
- Curb weight: ~2,550 lb (1,160 kg)

The Dodge M4S is an American prototype high-performance sports coupe originally engineered, designed, and built by Dodge in 1981 as a technology demonstrator vehicle. The designation M4S denotes "Mid-engine, 4-cylinder, Sport“. It was developed in collaboration with PPG Industries in the early 1980s and was used intermittently from 1984 to 1987, including as an CART pace car.

== History ==
The M4S was penned by then-chief designer of Dodge, Bob Ackerman. From its conception, the car was intended to be built as a fully engineered running prototype rather than as a display piece. Because it was intended to be used as a pace car, it was designed to reach a top speed of 200 mph (322 km/h). Chrysler designed the body and conducted extensive wind tunnel testing to achieve a drag coefficient of .236.

Although the car was designed by Chrysler, actual construction of the vehicle was handled by subcontractors. The semi-monocoque race car chassis was ordered from Huffaker Motorsports of California. 3-D Industries of Madison Heights, Michigan modeled the body and created molds. Special Projects, Inc. of Plymouth, Michigan cast the body panels, assembled the body and interior, and gave the car its signature “root beer brown” paint color by painting layers of pearl over a black base coat. Specialized Vehicles, Inc. of Troy, Michigan handled fabrication, final assembly, and maintenance of the completed car.

The M4S had a tested and confirmed top speed of 194.8 mph (313.5 km/h) and could go from 0 to 60 mph (97 km/h) in 4.1 seconds, with more than 440 hp (328 kW) under the hood coming from its relatively small turbocharged 2.2-litre (130 cu in) 4-cylinder engine.

The car was made famous by its appearance in The Wraith, a 1986 supernatural film, which has since gained it an enthusiast cult following.

A 1982 Dodge M4S Concept was present at the Walter P. Chrysler Museum before its closure.
