= Dodge ZEO =

Concept car developed by Dodge

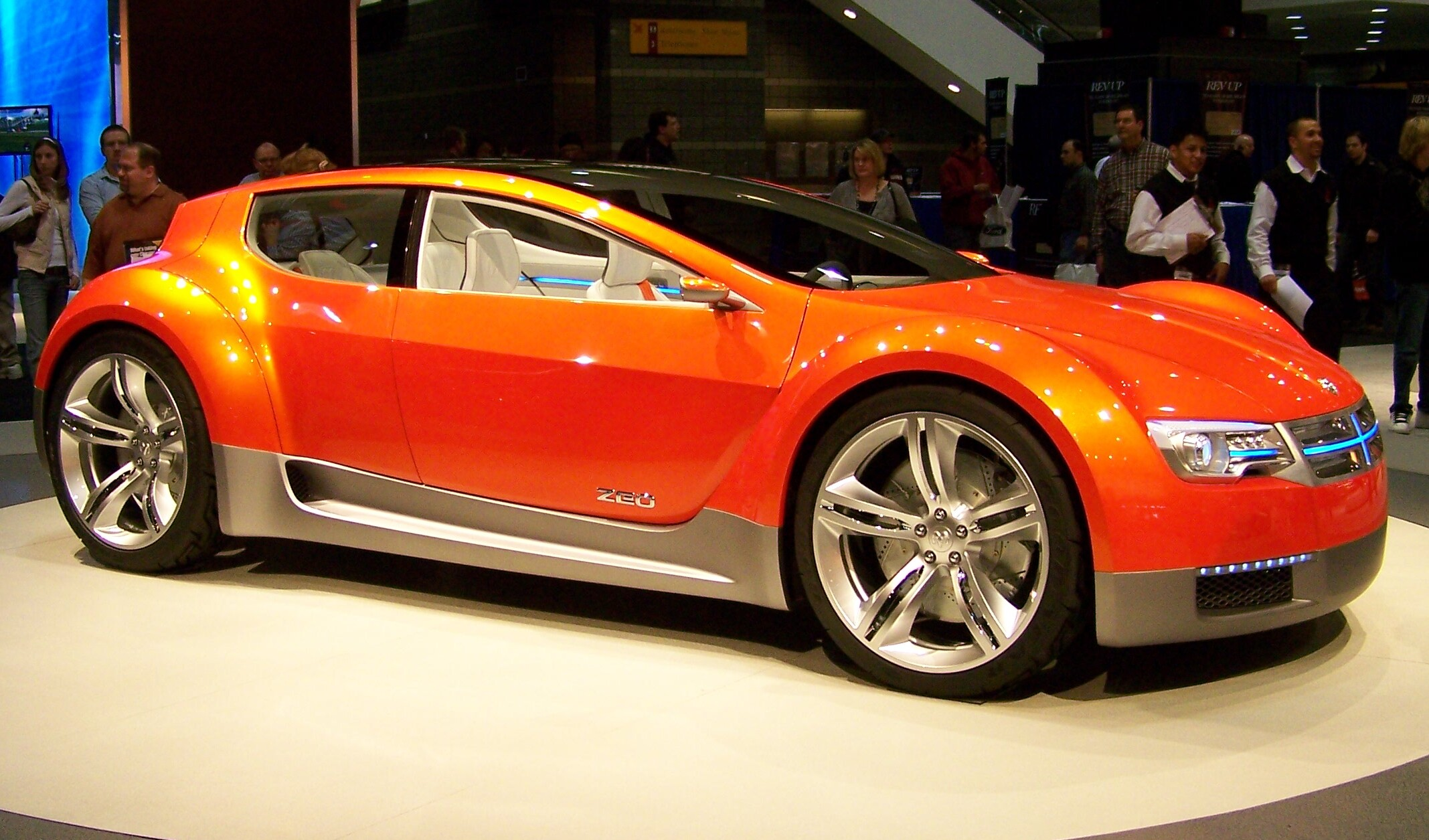

Overview
- Manufacturer: Dodge (Chrysler)
- Production: 2008

Body and chassis
- Class: Sport compact Concept car
- Body style: 2- and 4-door sport wagon
- Layout: Rear mid-motor, rear-wheel drive
- Doors: Scissor doors (front); Rear-hinged scissor doors (rear)

Powertrain
- Engine: Single electric motor
- Power output: 200 kW (268 hp)

Dimensions
- Wheelbase: 109.9 in (2792 mm)
- Length: 172.8 in (4390 mm)
- Width: 76.5 in (1944 mm)
- Height: 50.8 in (1290 mm)
- Curb weight: GVWR 2,650 lb (1,202 kg); 3,400 lb (1,542 kg)

The Dodge ZEO (Zero Emissions Operation) was a concept car built by Dodge. The ZEO showcases that the electric powertrain technology will potentially faster than the gasoline powered muscle cars.

The car was shown on 14 January 2008 at the 2008 North American International Auto Show. Due to the automotive industry crisis and Chrysler Chapter 11 reorganization occurred at the time, it never saw for production and the electric vehicle projects were scrapped.

== All electric vehicle ==
The Zeo was a four-passenger sport wagon, powered by a single 268 hp (200 kW) electric motor with a lithium-ion battery. It is rear wheel drive and could accelerate from 0-60 mph (97 km/h) in 5.7 seconds. The vehicle had a range of 250 miles (402 km) between charges. It featured conventional scissor doors in the front and rear hinged scissor doors in the back.

== Plug-in hybrid ==
A series plug-in hybrid version was expected to have a 40 miles (64 km) only-electric range.

The company said it expected to outsource much of the production, had not selected partners, and had no timetable for production. In the event, the Dodge ZEO never saw production.

== Gallery ==
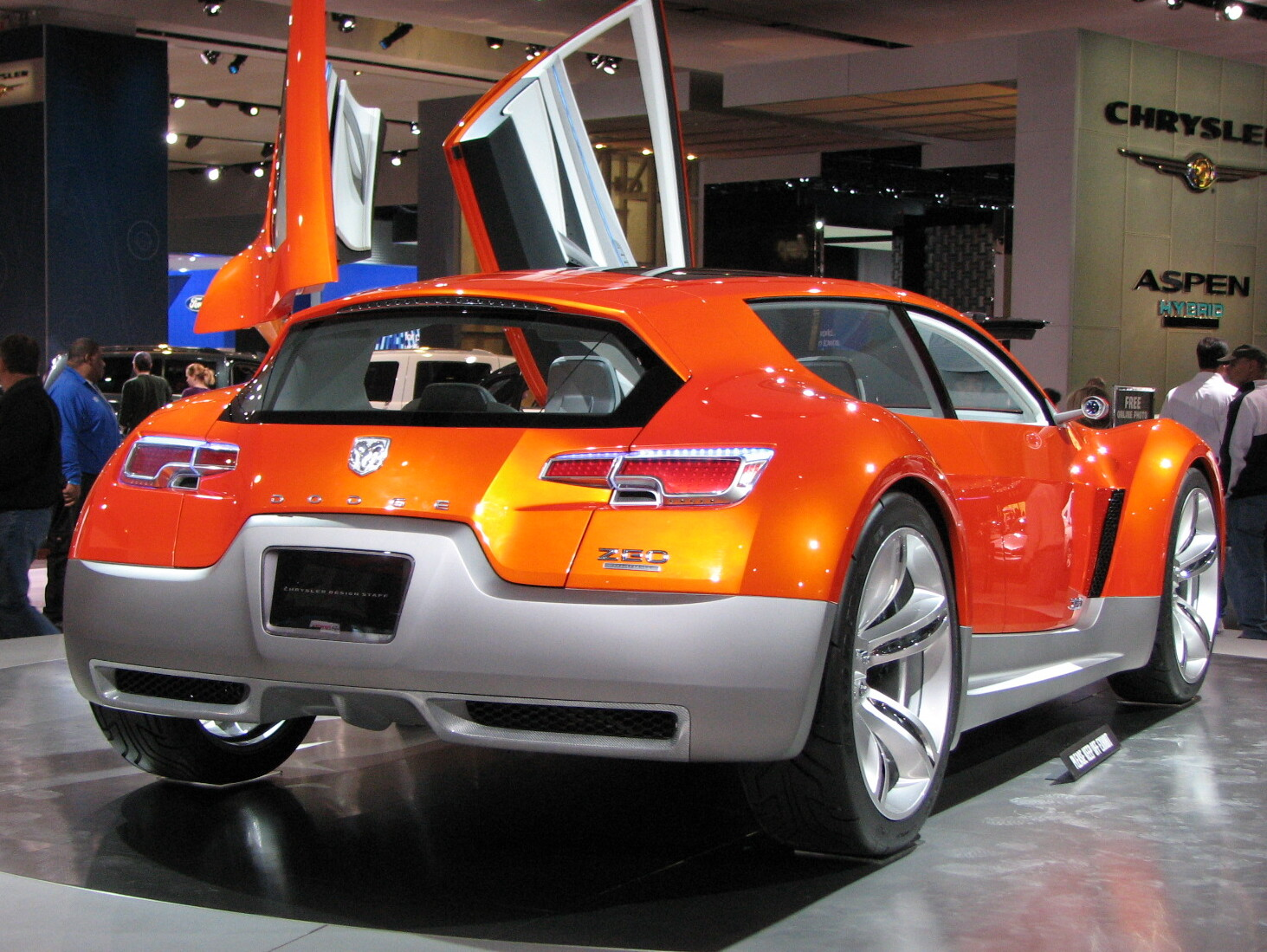
Rear view

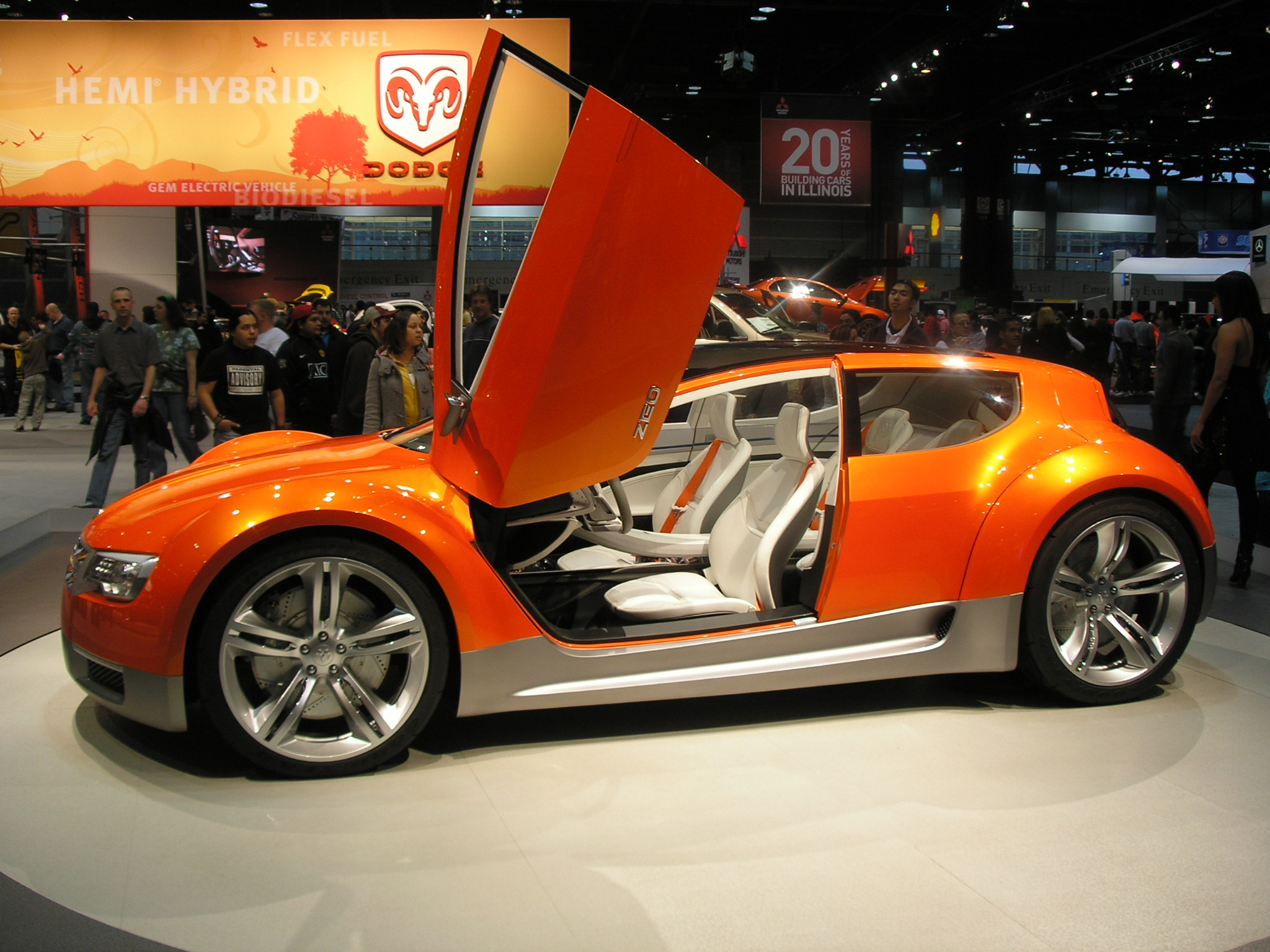
Side view with front door open
