= The Wraith =

1986 action/supernatural horror film by Mike Marvin

- Theatrical release poster
- Directed by: Mike Marvin
- Written by: Mike Marvin
- Produced by: John Kemeny
- Starring: Charlie Sheen; Nick Cassavetes; Sherilyn Fenn; Randy Quaid
- Cinematography: Reed Smoot
- Edited by: Scott Conrad; Gary Rocklen
- Music by: Michael Hoenig; J. Peter Robinson
- Production companies: New Century Entertainment Corporation; Alliance Entertainment; Turbo Productions
- Distributed by: New Century Vista Film Company
- Release date: November 21, 1986 (US)
- Running time: 93 minutes
- Country: United States
- Language: English
- Budget: C$8 million

The Wraith is a 1986 independently made American action-fantasy film, produced by John Kemeny, written and directed by Mike Marvin, and starring Charlie Sheen, Sherilyn Fenn, Nick Cassavetes, and Randy Quaid. The film was theatrically released November 21, 1986, on just 88 screens in the United States by New Century Vista Film Company (later New Century Entertainment Corporation).

== Plot ==
In the town of Brooks, Arizona, Packard Walsh, the leader of a gang of car thieves, coerces people with fast cars into racing, with the winner of the race taking ownership of the loser's car. Packard controls everyone through intimidation including Keri Johnson, whom he views as his property. Keri's boyfriend, Jamie Hankins, was the victim of an unsolved murder and Keri, who was with him, has no memory of the traumatic event.

Jake Kesey arrives in Brooks riding a dirt bike. He befriends Billy Hankins (Jamie's brother) and Keri. While swimming at a river, Jake is shown to have knife scars on his neck and back.

Packard's control of the illegal races comes to an end when an all-black Dodge M4S Turbo Interceptor supercar appears with a driver covered head-to-toe in black body armor and helmet, and metal braces resembling those worn by victims of physical trauma. The driver challenges Packard's gang to a race, ending in high-speed, explosive crashes in which one of the gang members is killed. His body appears unharmed afterwards except for burned-out eye sockets. The Turbo Interceptor then reconstructs itself and eludes the pursuing Sheriff Loomis in a cloud of glowing light.

Two more gang members, Skank and Gutterboy, are killed when the Turbo Interceptor races inside the gang's warehouse, causing an explosion, with Rughead, the gang's tech-geek, witnessing it from a distance. Rughead, who had nothing to do with the gang murdering Jamie, figures out why each of the gang members had been targeted. When Loomis arrives at the scene of the destruction, Rughead tells him Packard and his gang had murdered Jamie Hankins.

Now with his gang mostly gone, Packard decides to flee town. He kidnaps Keri and beats up Billy when he tries to intervene. When Packard tries driving to California, Keri resists. As they both exit the car and he pulls a knife on her, the Turbo Interceptor arrives and challenges Packard to a race. Packard accepts and is then killed in an explosive head-on collision with the Turbo Interceptor, like the rest of his gang were. Loomis calls off the hunt for the mysterious driver, believing it to be futile.

As Keri arrives home that night, the Turbo Interceptor pulls up and Jake emerges. Keri realizes that Jake is a revived form of her dead boyfriend Jamie, who had returned for a chance to rekindle their past relationship. He then asks her to wait for him because he has one last thing to do. Jake then gives his car to Billy. When Billy asks who he is, Jake says that Billy already knows, and as he rides off on his dirt bike, Billy then realizes Jake is Jamie. Jake picks up Keri, whom Loomis is watching from a distance. Together they ride off along the desert highway into the moonlight.

== Cast ==
- Charlie Sheen as Jake Kesey / The Wraith / Jamie Hankins
- Matthew Barry as Billy Hankins
- Sherilyn Fenn as Keri Johnson
- Randy Quaid as Sheriff G.L. Loomis
- Clint Howard as "Rughead"
- Nick Cassavetes as Packard Walsh
- David Sherrill as Maurice "Skank"
- Jamie Bozian as "The Gutterboy"
- Griffin O'Neal as Oggie Fisher
- Chris Nash as "Minty"
- Christopher Bradley as Jamie Hankins
- Vickie Benson as The Waitress
- Jeffrey Sudzin as "Redd", Skank's uncle
- Peder Melhuse as Deputy Murphy
- Michael Hundrtford as Deputy Stokes
- Dick Alexander as Deputy Sandeval
- Steven Eckholdt as George, Boy In Daytona
- Elizabeth Cox as Girl In Daytona
- Joan H. Reynolds as Policewoman

== Production ==
=== Shooting locations ===
The Wraith was shot entirely in and around Tucson, Arizona; shots of the hilly road leading into the fictional "Brooks, AZ" were filmed on Freeman Road on the city's southeast side. Keri's (Sherilyn Fenn) home is located at 2128 East 5th Street.

Sheriff Loomis goes to talk to Skank and Gutterboy at the Davis-Monthan Air Force Base, at the airplane graveyard where they both work. The film's swimming hole is located in Sabino Canyon, off North Upper Sabino Canyon Road. The curvy mountain road where Packard and his gang challenge other cars to deadly races is the General Hitchcock/Catalina/Mount Lemmon Highway that winds through natural stone monoliths north of the city. Skank and Gutterboy chase after Jamie and Keri down North 4th Avenue at East 7th Street. The portion of the chase that leads into a tunnel is the since-redone tunnel on North 4th Avenue, where it crosses under railroad tracks; Jake and Keri are seen riding down the road through Sabino Canyon Recreation Area (near Sabino Lake Dam) northeast of Tucson.

Bruce Ingram, a camera operator, died during the filming of one of the car chases; another crew member was seriously injured.

=== Turbo Interceptor ===
The Dodge M4S Turbo Interceptor used in the film was originally a pace car built by Chrysler Corporation and PPG Industries. Six copies were made for use in the film: two stunt cars made from molds of the original car and four non-drivable "dummies" that were destroyed during filming. During production, the real Dodge Turbo Interceptor was used in close-ups. That original was located at the Walter P. Chrysler Museum in Auburn Hills, MI until 2016, when the museum closed permanently.

== Soundtrack ==
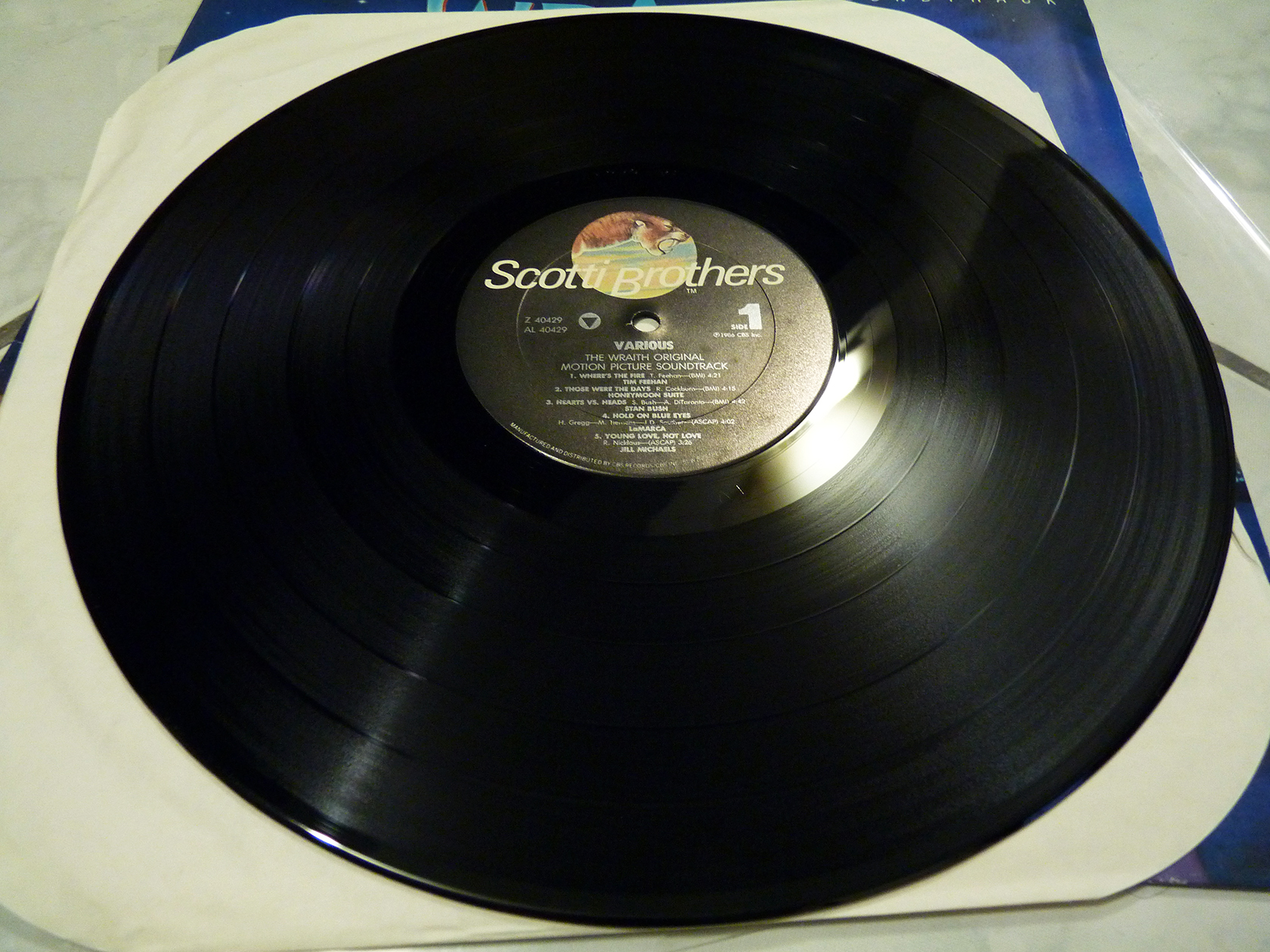
Original motion picture soundtrack on vinyl

The music score was composed and performed by Michael Hoenig and J. Peter Robinson, two famous synth composers of film and TV series soundtracks. The soundtrack LP was recorded by Rick Hart and entirely played on a NED Synclavier II.

Many famous 1980s rock music hits are included on the film's soundtrack:

- Tim Feehan – "Where's the Fire"
- Ozzy Osbourne – "Secret Loser"
- Stan Bush – "Hearts vs. Heads"
- Ian Hunter – "Wake Up Call"
- Mötley Crüe – "Smokin' in the Boys Room"
- Robert Palmer – "Addicted to Love"
- Nick Gilder – "Scream of Angels"
- Lion – "Power Love"
- Honeymoon Suite – "Those Were the Days"
- Lion – "Never Surrender"
- Bonnie Tyler – "Matter of the Heart"
- Mark Tiemans – "Hold on Blue Eyes"
- Billy Idol – "Rebel Yell"
- Jill Michaels – "Young Love, Hot Love"
- James House – "Bad Mistake"

== Release ==
The Wraith was released in the United States on November 21, 1986. In the Philippines, the film was released as Black Moon Rising: Part-2 on April 29, 1987, connecting it to the unrelated film Black Moon Rising starring Tommy Lee Jones. The film grossed $1,402,535 on its opening weekend. The Wraith grossed $3,500,045 worldwide.

=== Home media ===
In 1987, the film was released to VHS video by Lightning Video, then on LaserDisc by Image Entertainment; it was then released in 2003 on DVD by Platinum Disc Corporation (now Echo Bridge Home Entertainment). In spite of having no special features and only being available in the pan-and-scan format, there is footage retained that was missing on the original VHS and LaserDisc releases. Lionsgate released a widescreen Special Edition DVD on March 2, 2010, which included the previously missing footage.

== Reception ==
The Wraith holds a 33% rating on Rotten Tomatoes based on fifteen reviews. Review aggregator Metacritic gives the film 39 out of 100 indicating mostly negative reviews.

=== Critical response ===
The Wraith received mixed reviews from critics. Film historian and critic Leonard Maltin dismissed the film as "... for those who favor fast cars and lots of noise." In the Time Out review, editor John Pym saw The Wraith having "comic-strip killer car thieves" with "...the best joke having one of the thugs knowing the word 'wraith.'" Janet Maslin of The New York Times wrote in her review: "The greatest suspense in The Wraith, which opened yesterday at the National and other theaters, is generated by the problem of how the writer-director, Mike Marvin, will work a word like wraith into the dialogue. It wouldn't be common parlance under the best of circumstances, let alone in a teen-age action film filled with car races."

== See also ==
- List of American films of 1986
- List of film accidents
