= Razor (short story) =

1926 short story by Vladimir Nabokov

"Razor" is a short story by the Russian writer Vladimir Nabokov. It was first published (as Britva) in the expatriate Russian literary magazine Rul' in 1926, but a French translation did not appear until 1991, and an English one (by Dmitri Nabokov, the writer's son) not until 1995.

== Plot summary ==
Ivanov, an exiled Russian and former military officer living in Berlin, has taken up employment as a barber; an apt position, Nabokov notes, as Ivanov's sharp facial appearance had earned him the nickname "Razor" in his earlier life. On a hot day, an unnamed character dressed largely in black enters the barber's, deserted save for Ivanov, and requests a shave. Ivanov quickly realises that the customer is a fellow Russian who, the reader gathers, tortured Ivanov during Russia's period of revolutionary upheaval. With the unnamed character sitting in the chair, his face lathered with shaving cream, Ivanov reminds him of their last encounter. Ivanov then proceeds to shave him, recounting their previous meeting while also strongly hinting at the effect that one slip of the razor could have. Having told his story, Ivanov relents and the terrified and clean-shaven Soviet flees from the barber's.

== See also ==
- Hernando Téllez, whose work "Lather and Nothing Else" has a very similar plot to "Razor"
