= Razor (configuration management) =

- Developer(s): Visible Systems
- Operating system: Windows (operating system), Unix, Linux

Razor is an integrated suite software configuration management system from Visible Systems, which provides process management, issue/problem tracking, version control, and release management.

Razor provides a framework for managing software development processes, including support for agile and waterfall methodologies. It includes a built-in issue-tracking system that allows users to log in and track bugs, defects, and other issues that arise during the software development process. It also includes a version control system that allows users to track changes to their code over time and collaborate with other team members.

Razor runs on Windows, NT, Unix, Linux, or Motif environments. It was developed as an integrated product to support Integrated Development Environment for IBM VisualAge, Microsoft Visual Studio, Microsoft.NET, Rational Rose, and PowerBuilder.
