= Dodge Slingshot =

Concept car developed by Dodge

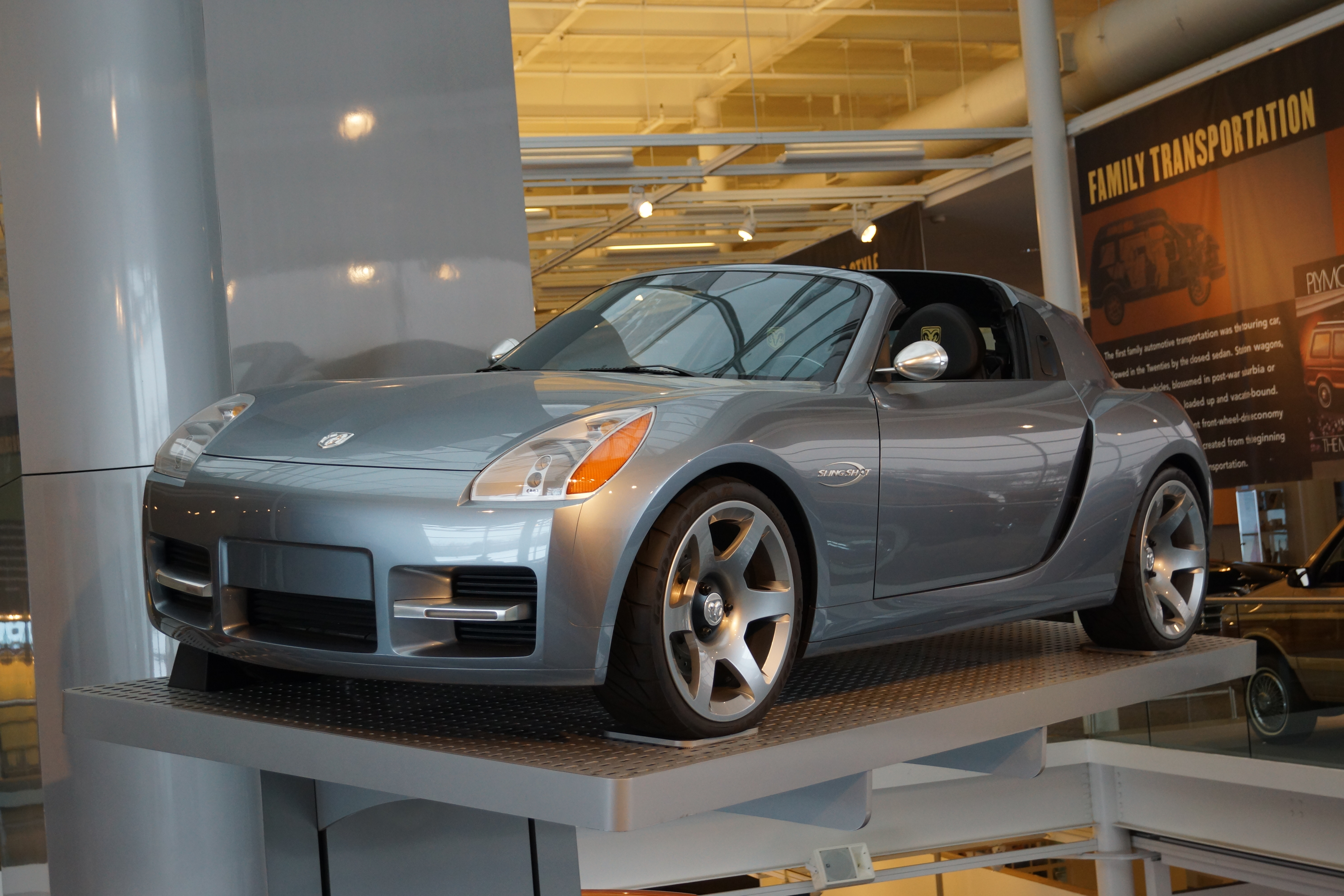
- Dodge Slingshot at the now closed Walter P. Chrysler Museum

Overview
- Manufacturer: Dodge
- Also called: Dodge Sling Shot
- Production: 2004
- Designer: Freeman Thomas

Body and chassis
- Class: Concept car
- Body style: 2-door hardtop convertible
- Layout: RR layout

Powertrain
- Engine: 698 cc M160 I3 turbo (gasoline)
- Transmission: 5-speed manual

The Dodge Slingshot (or Dodge Sling Shot) was a concept car created by Dodge. It was introduced at the 2004 New York International Auto Show. This car was built to be a car that was possibly targeted for a younger generation.

== Specifications ==
The Slingshot has a rear-mounted, 3-cylinder, gasoline engine with normal aspiration and induction. The engine gives out a total of 100 horsepower. It can go from 0-60 mph in about 10 seconds. The car uses a five-speed manual transmission.

The Slingshot has a combined fuel economy of 45 miles per US gallon (5.2 L/100 km; 54 mpg_{‑imp}). The design of the car is derived from the past of the Chrysler Group, notably the muscle car era of the 1960s and 1970s. The Slingshot also features a canvas roof panel. It was based on the smart Roadster Coupé, which was in production from 2003 to 2007.

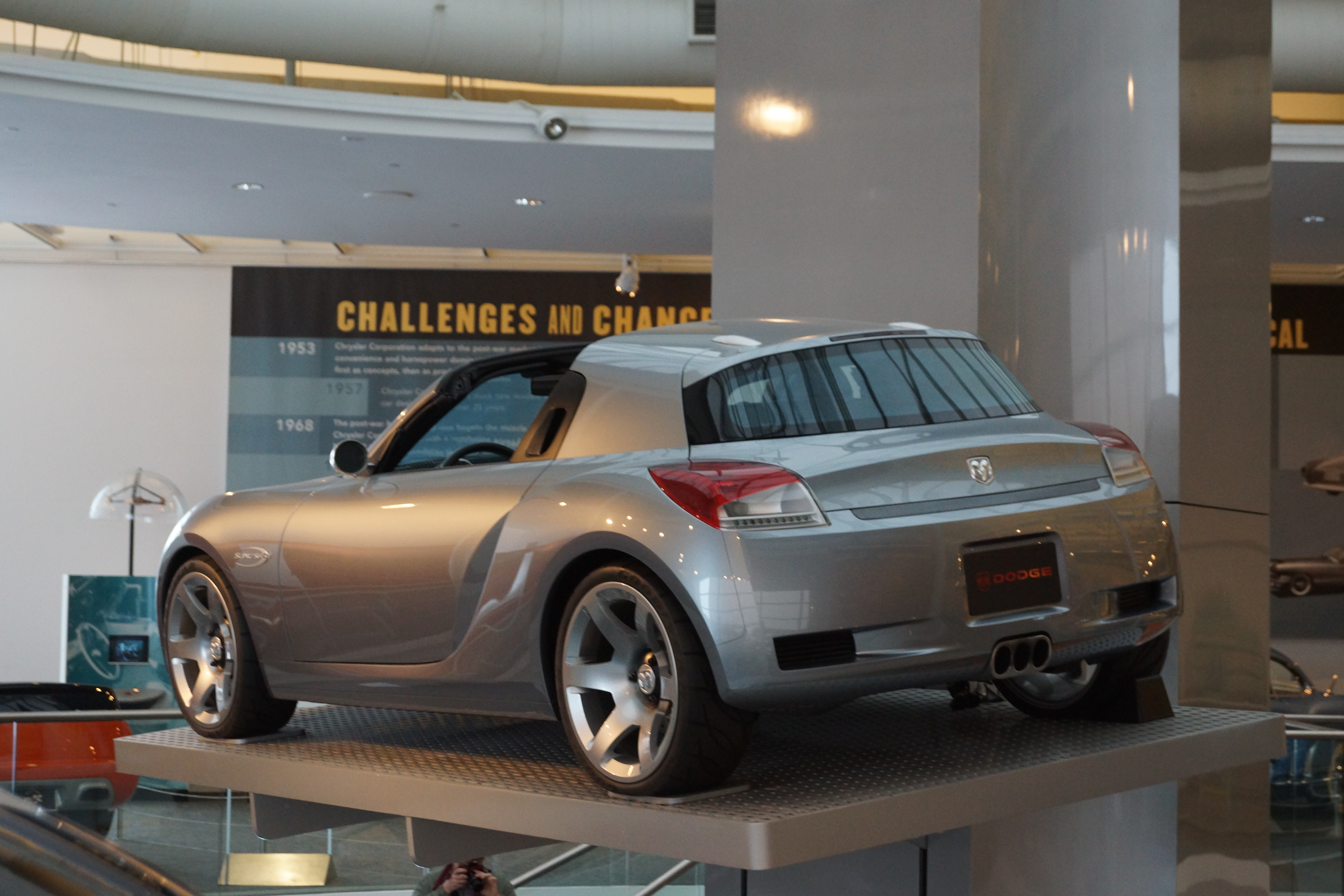
Slingshot rear end
