= Razor, Texas =

Unincorporated community in Texas, US

Coordinates: 33°52′55″N 95°38′28″W

Razor is an unincorporated community in Lamar County, Texas, United States.

== History ==
A post office called Razor was established in 1904, and remained in operation until 1935. The origin of the name "Razor" is obscure, but is thought to have been applied by postmaster A. K. Haynes after a brand of tobacco that was sold in his shop.
