= Dodge Razor =

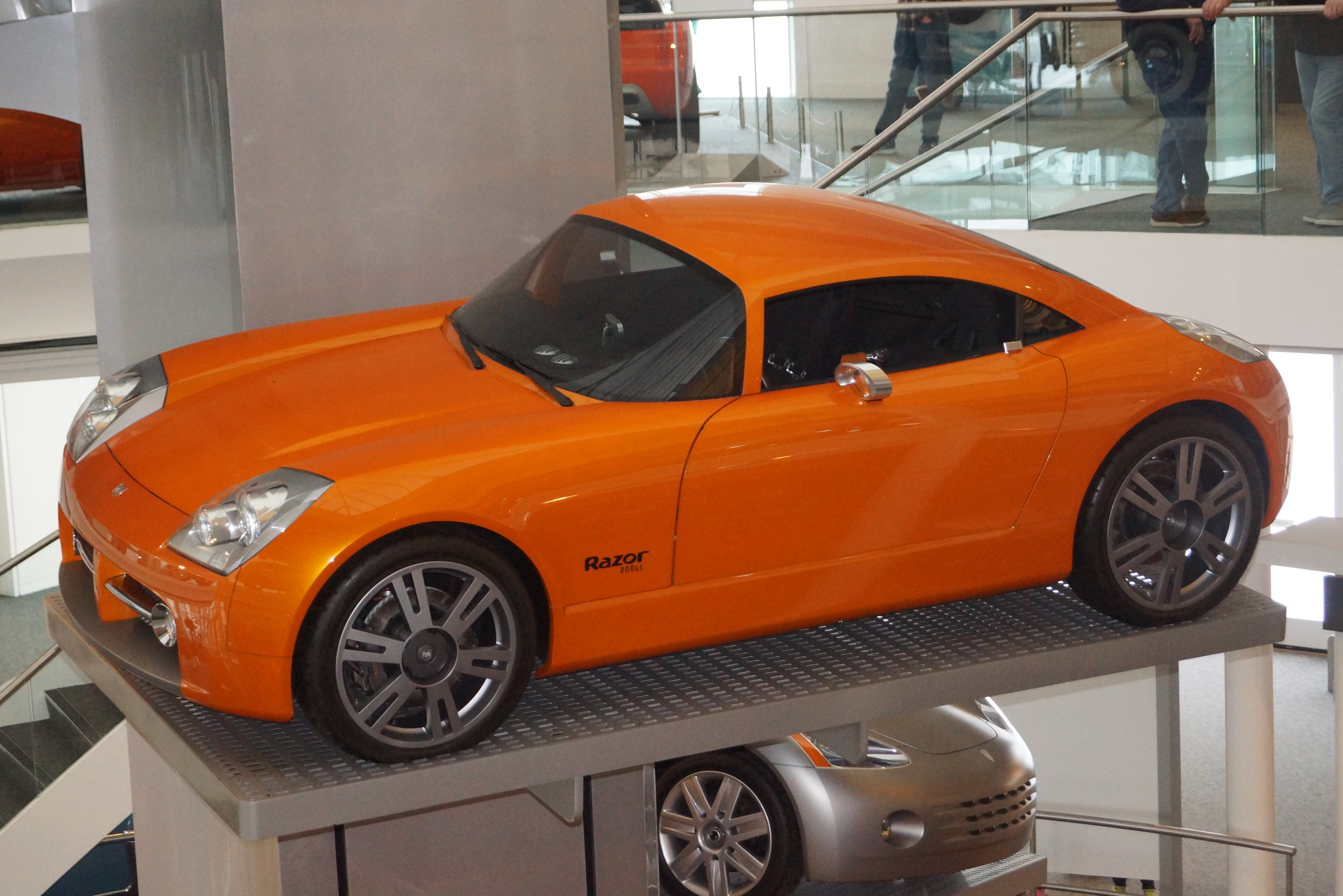
- The Dodge Razor at the Walter P. Chrysler Museum

Overview
- Manufacturer: Dodge and Razor
- Production: 2002

Body and chassis
- Class: Concept car
- Body style: 2-door fastback coupe
- Layout: FR

Powertrain
- Engine: 2.4 L turbocharged PowerTech I4 with intercooler
- Transmission: 6-speed manual

Dimensions
- Curb weight: 1,134 kg (2,500 lb)

The Dodge Razor is a concept car created by American car manufacturer Dodge and introduced at the 2002 North American International Auto Show. The Razor was a partnership between Dodge and scooter manufacturer Razor, who were responsible for part of its design.

== Design and features ==
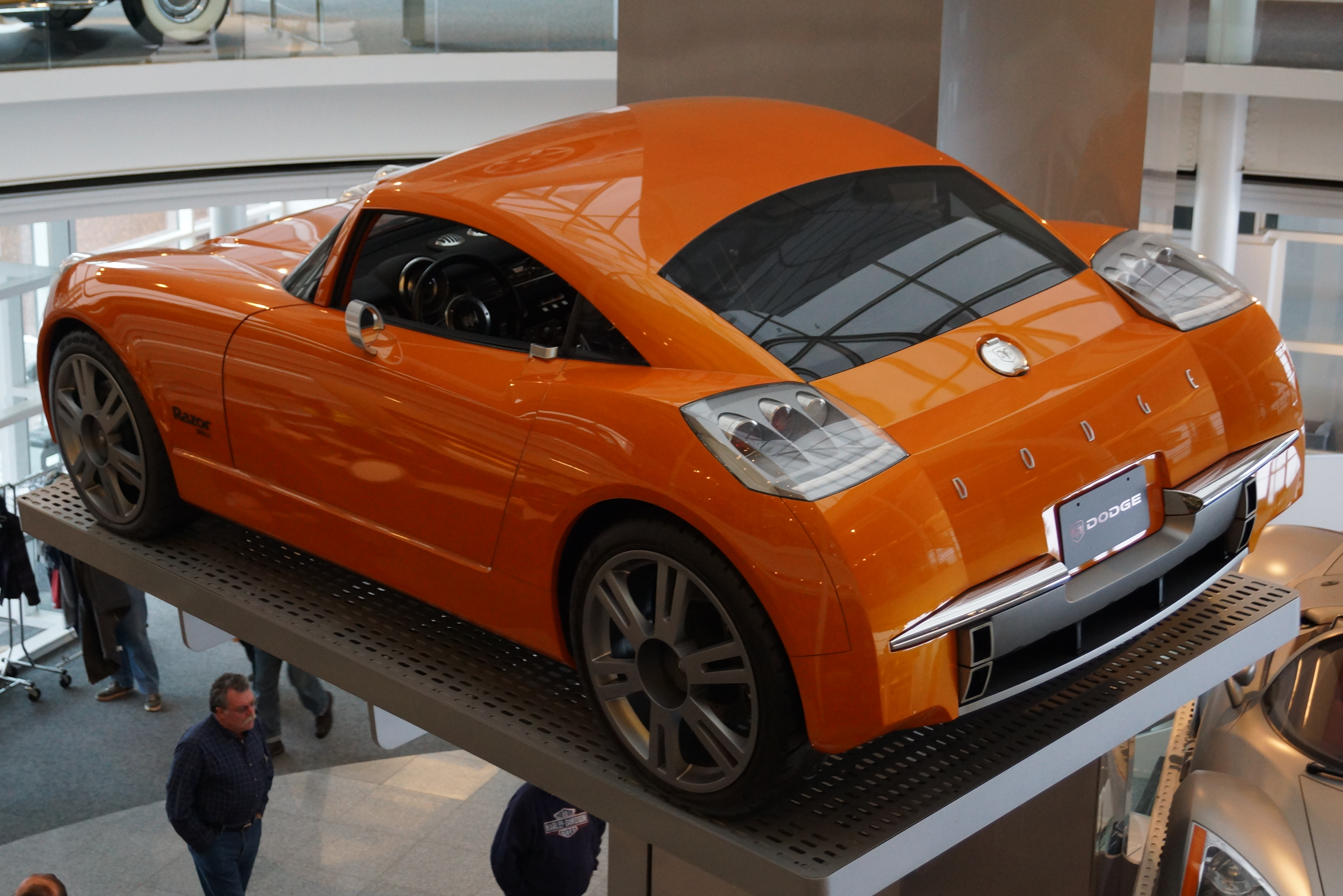
Rear end

The Razor's exterior design was done by Kevin Verduyn and Akino Tsuchiya, and was based on 1960s European sports cars, with a modern minimalist style along with an "Orange Slice" paint job. It was designed for driving enjoyment, lacking a radio, power windows or power brakes. The interior features a lightweight competition seats with a four-point racing harness. Two orange Razor scooters were packed inside, supposedly instead of a spare tire. It was also equipped with essential tools.

== Specifications ==
The Razor is powered by a 2.4 L Chrysler PowerTech turbocharged I4 engine with an intercooler producing 250 hp (186 kW) and 230 lb⋅ft (312 N⋅m) of torque. The Razor was rear-wheel drive and used a six-speed manual transmission. Dodge claimed its top speed was over 140 mph (225 km/h) and that it could accelerate from 0 to 60 mph (97 km/h) in less than six seconds.

== Production attempt ==
Dodge said they were targeting a base price of around US$14,500 for the production Razor, but the concept never ended up reaching production.
