= Lotus Europa S =

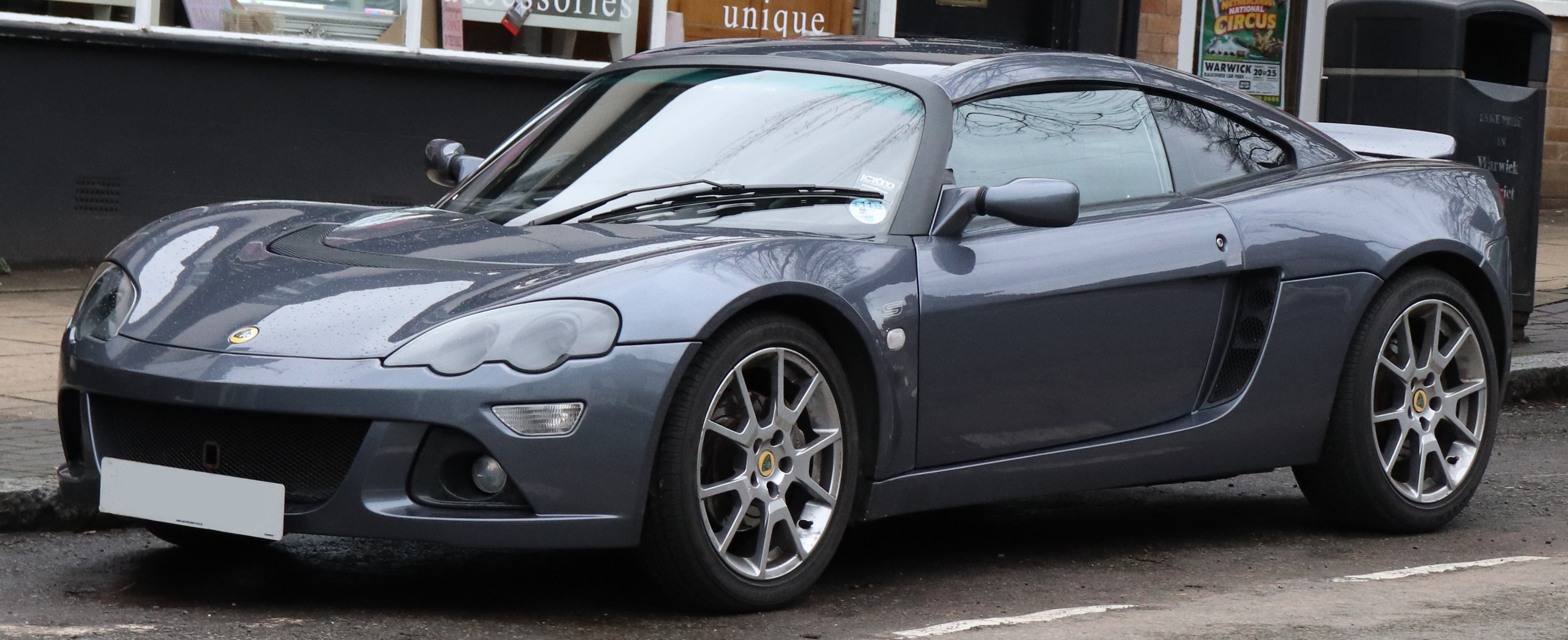

Overview
- Manufacturer: Lotus Cars
- Production: 2006–2010; 458 produced
- Assembly: United Kingdom: Hethel, Norfolk, England
- Designer: Russell Carr

Body and chassis
- Class: Sports car (S)
- Body style: 2-door coupé
- Layout: Transverse mid-engine, rear-wheel drive
- Platform: Lotus Elise Series 2 platform
- Related: Lotus Elise; Vauxhall VX220; Lotus Exige; Lotus 2-Eleven; Tesla Roadster; Dodge EV; Proton Lekir

Powertrain
- Engine: 2.0 L GM Z20LER Ecotec turbo I4
- Transmission: 6-speed Getrag M32 manual

Dimensions
- Wheelbase: 2,330 mm (91.7 in)
- Length: 3,900 mm (153.5 in)
- Width: 1,850 mm (72.8 in)
- Height: 1,120 mm (44.1 in)
- Kerb weight: 995 kg (2,194 lb)

The Lotus Europa S (Type 121) is a sports car built by the British company Lotus Cars from 2006 until 2010. It has a rear mid-engine, rear-wheel-drive layout and was designed to be a more comfortable variant of the driver-focused Lotus Elise and its derivative, the Exige. The Europa S revived the Europa nameplate previously used in the 1960s and 1970s.

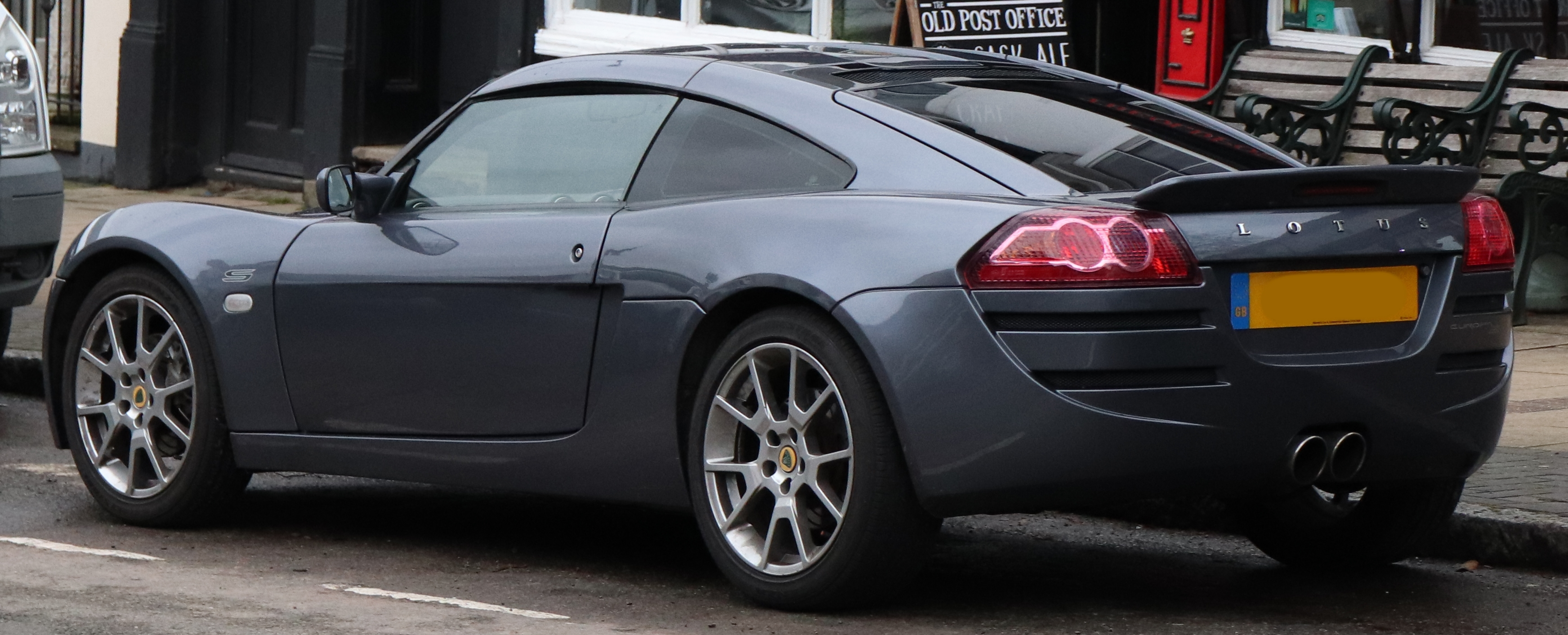
Lotus Europa S

The Europa S features a larger boot (trunk), greater sound-proofing and easier cabin access due to the lower chassis sides and higher roof line. The Europa S includes creature comforts such as air conditioning, a sound system, leather interior and interior carpeting as standard equipment reflecting its grand touring nature.

== Specifications ==
The Europa S has a dry weight of just 995 kg (2,194 lb) achieved by an extruded and bonded aluminium chassis with composite body panels and front crash structure.

The Europa S is a derivative of the Lotus Elise and Exige to the extent that the cars have variations of the same bonded aluminium chassis but the Europa bears a separate Lotus model designation (Type 121) due, in part, to its longer chassis and completely new design. The mid-engine two-seat coupé has a 2.0 L turbocharged GM Z20LER Ecotec straight-4 engine, rated at 147 kW (200 PS; 197 hp) at 5,400 rpm and 272 N⋅m (201 lb⋅ft) of torque. coupled to the Getrag M32 6-speed manual transmission. This allows the car to accelerate from 0–60 mph (0–97 km/h) in around 5.5 seconds, and 0–100 mph (0–161 km/h) in around 13.8 seconds. The Europa S can reach a top speed of 143 mph (230 km/h).

== Europa SE ==
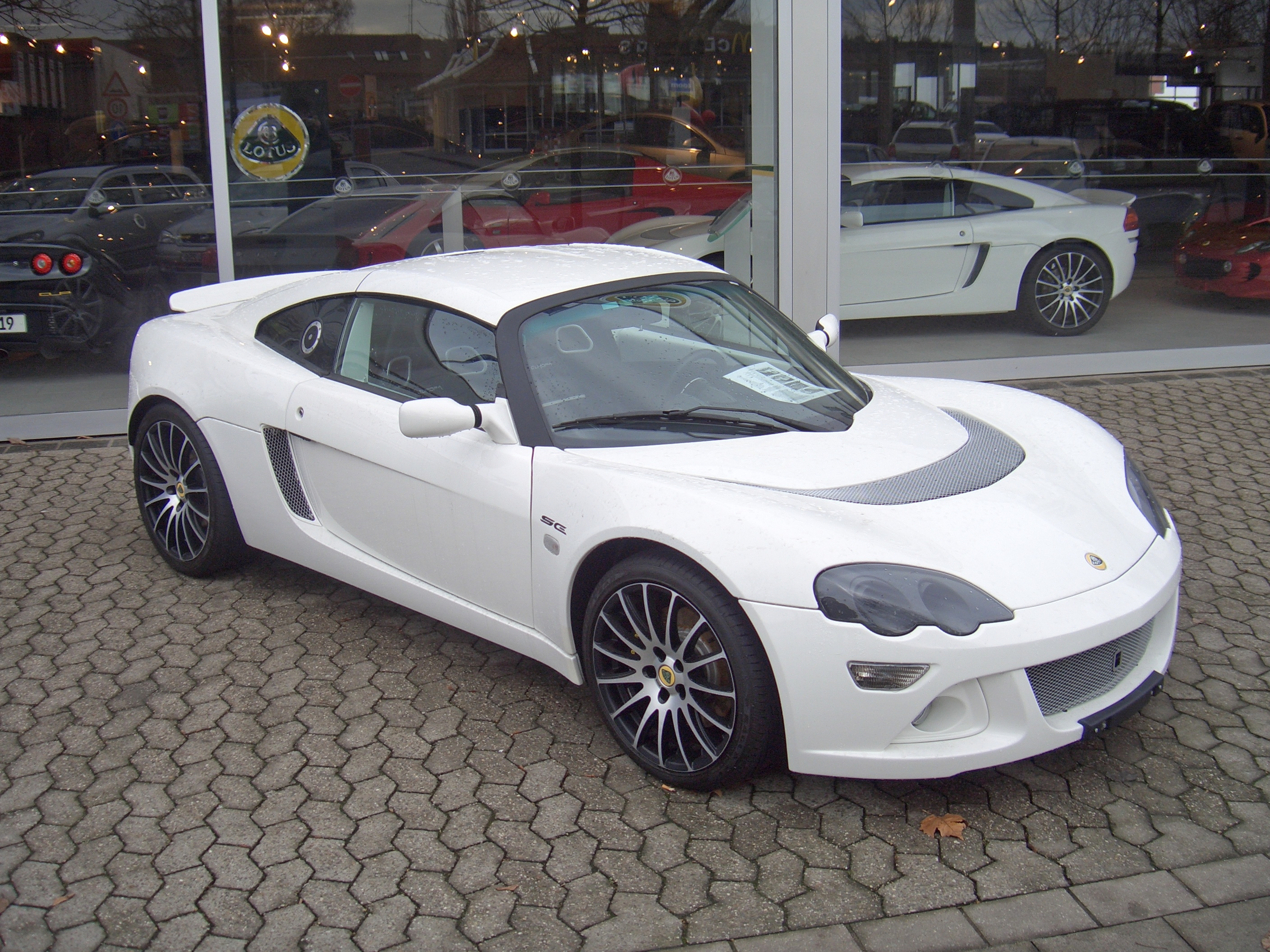
Lotus Europa SE

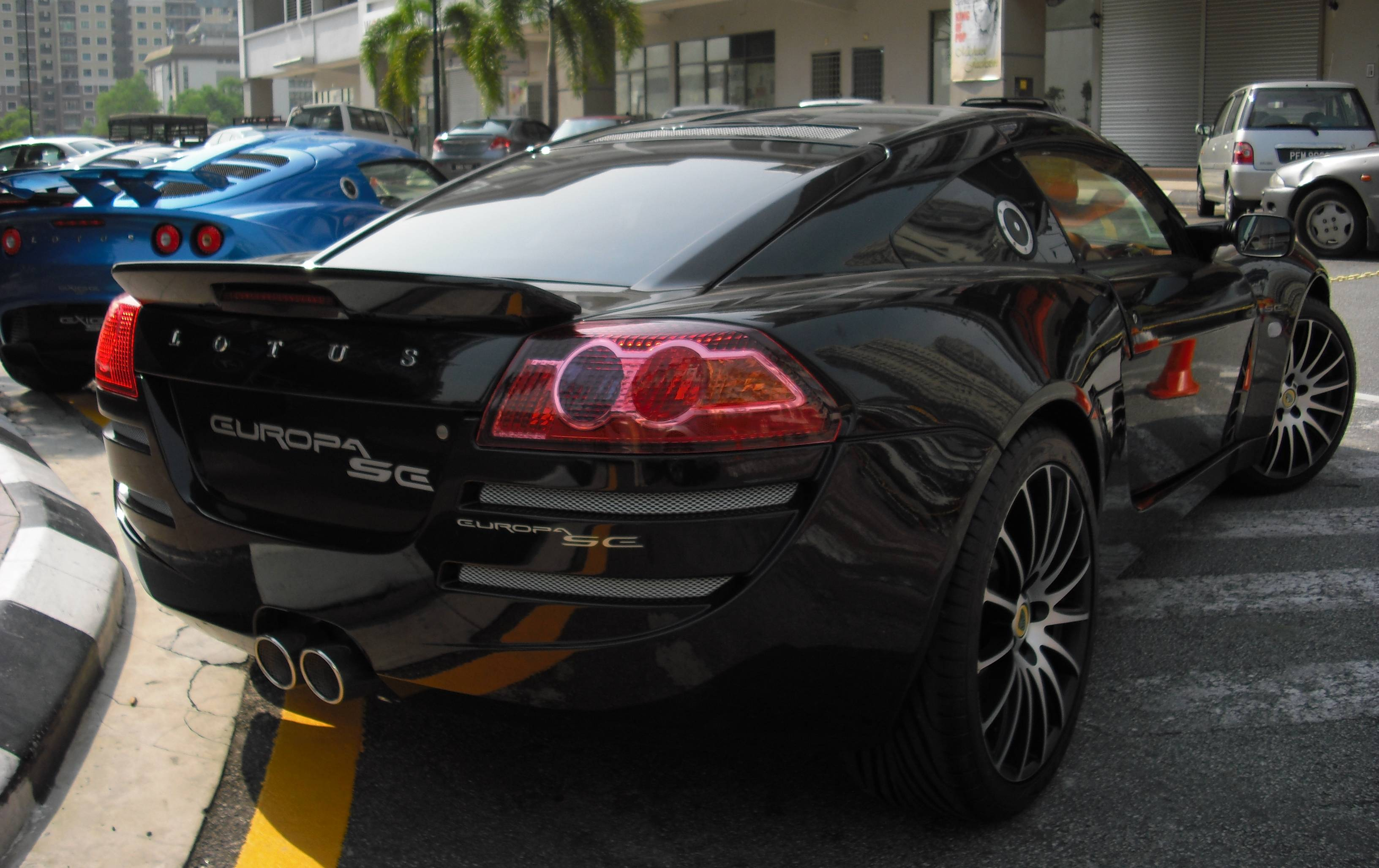
Rear View showing the SE badging

The Europa S was not a sales success. Because of this, Lotus engineering director Roger Becker took charge of the car's development programme and the Europa SE variant was launched, replacing the Europa S.

The Lotus Europa SE was presented at the 2008 Geneva Motor Show. Its engine was modified to achieve more power at 165 kW; 222 hp (225 PS) and 300 N⋅m (221 lb⋅ft). It has lighter wheels as standard, with 17 inches (43.2 cm), and optionally 18 inches (45.7 cm) could be chosen. The brakes are from AP Racing, with discs of greater diameter at 308 mm (12.1 inch).

=== Engine ===
The Europa SE utilises the same engine as the Europa S, but is fitted with a revised turbocharger featuring a high output compressor, a re-calibrated engine controller, and a set of colder grade spark plugs. These changes provide a smoother, more linear, and enhanced torque characteristic for readily accessible engine performance, and result in a power increase to 225 PS (165 kW; 222 hp) and 300 N⋅m (221 lb⋅ft) of torque.

=== Wheels and Tyres ===
The new cast alloy 15-spoke wheels have larger width and diameter. They are fitted with Goodyear Eagle F1 GS-D3 tyres in 195/45 R17 on the front (increased from 175/55) and 235/40 R18 (from 225/45 R17) at the rear. This, in combination with revised suspension tuning, provides higher levels of both longitudinal and lateral grip and results in improved handling, balance and braking performance, especially in very wet conditions.

=== Suspension ===
The front and rear spring rates have been increased, along with revisions made to the internal valves of the dampers. New front damper mounting brackets are fitted together with a softer front anti-roll bar. These changes, in combination with the revised wheel/tyre equipment, provide a nose down rake and slightly lowered ride height, thus producing the aforementioned driving properties.

=== Brakes ===
In order to provide greater braking performance in conditions of repeated high speed use, larger single piece front brake discs (308mm vs. 288mm) feature curved and handed internal cooling vanes and cross drilling. 4-piston, light alloy, A.P. Racing front callipers use Ferodo DS25HP pad material, also fitted to the otherwise standard rear brakes, and a re-calibration of the ABS software ensures that the greater braking potential of the new wheel/tyre/suspension package is fully used, with intervention occurring only at the threshold of grip.

=== Interior ===
The Europa SE comes as standard with the Luxury Touring Pack (optional on the 'S') and features re-styled trim panels in soft, lightweight, high grade leather.

== Production ==
The Europa was reportedly developed under the codename "Sepang". The car was originally planned to be manufactured at parent company Proton's factory in Malaysia, allowing for a lower sale price, but ultimately the company chose the Lotus Hethel factory for the car's production. A Proton-badged version was planned but cancelled, although the idea would be briefly revisited with the 2010 Proton Lekir concept.

Delivery of the Europa S began in September 2006 from the Lotus factory at Hethel, Norfolk. The car was not offered for sale in the United States or Canada as the Opel/Vauxhall-built turbocharger was not certified to meet emissions requirements for those countries.

The Europa S body and platform was also used by Chrysler for their Dodge Circuit EV electric car concept.

The Europa S was replaced by the more potent Europa SE in 2008. Lotus stopped production of the Europa SE in early 2010 due to new emission standards. Production of the Europa models amounted to 458 cars in total with only 48 cars built in SE specification.

== Reception ==
=== Europa S ===
Reviews of the Europa S were not in line with those for its sister models, the Elise and the Exige, The Sunday Times noted that while introducing a lower-revving engine (a turbocharged General Motors 1998 cc, four-cylinder) creates a more comfortable level of sound, the performance is noticeably different from the higher-revving Toyota engines, and with a heavier body shell, the performance isn't in line with the Elise or Exige. It has the same wheelbase as the Vauxhall VX220, which is longer than that of the Elise.

Jason Plato, from British TV show Fifth Gear, tested the car and generally didn't find it good enough to be a proper GT car because he thought that the car needs to be more comfortable. Presenter Jeremy Clarkson remarked on British motoring show Top Gear, "we won't even play [the review film] because it was such a dreary car."

However, Evo magazine gave the car a generally positive review after being given the chance to test a production model in Belgium's Spa-Francorchamps circuit, saying that the car was a "refreshingly mature and desirable sports car." During the same session, Evo group tested the Porsche Cayman S, BMW Z4 M and Nissan 350Z GT-S and "couldn't resist" comparing the Lotus to these three decidedly more expensive sport coupés. While the Lotus was slower than the three cars, Evo concluded that at around £33,000, it would be a very good match for the three cars' lower spec versions.

=== Europa SE ===
Compared to the Europa S, the SE received a fairly positive response. British magazine The Independent while reviewing the Europa SE gave it a positive reception praising its power increase and better handling over the Europa S. But it didn't consider it as a proper GT car due to its noisy air-conditioning fans and insufficient sound proofing. It also noted the use of various Vauxhall equipment in the car.

British automotive magazine Autocar described the car as "Much improved. Where the original car tended to understeer, this one is far more neutral, even at racetrack cornering speeds." The magazine praised its responsive handling and the delivery of power, even considering it better than the Elise/Exige and more civilised for normal traffic conditions. It also described the interior as normally luxurious along with the fact that the car could be used for long journeys. But it also concluded that the cabin noise was too much for the car to be considered a proper grand tourer.
