= Dodge Super 8 Hemi =

Concept car developed by Dodge

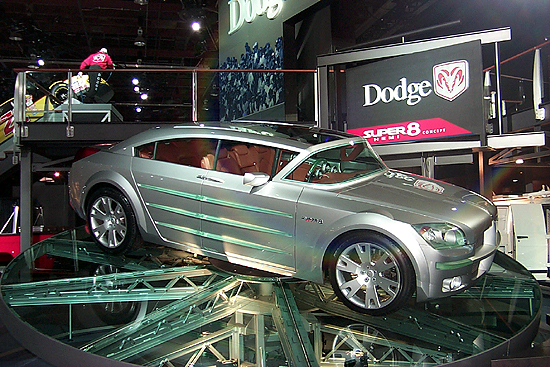

Overview
- Manufacturer: Dodge (DaimlerChrysler)
- Production: 2001
- Designer: Rob McMahon, Kevin Verdun

Body and chassis
- Class: Concept car
- Body style: 4-door station wagon
- Doors: Suicide

Powertrain
- Engine: 5.7L EZB/EZD Hemi V8
- Transmission: Autostick 4-speed automatic

The Dodge Super 8 Hemi is a concept car created by Dodge. It was first introduced at the 2001 North American International Auto Show. It is a combination of the classic design from Dodge's past vehicles and the design from Dodge's SUVs and trucks.

== Specifications ==
The Super 8 Hemi is equipped with a Chrysler 5.7-liter EZB/EZD HEMI OHV V8 engine developing up to 353 hp (263 kW; 358 PS), 395 lb⋅ft (536 N⋅m) torque and has a top speed of 154 mph (248 km/h). It will go from 0-60 in about 5.7 seconds and mated with a four-speed automatic transmission with an Autostick.
