= Razor USA =

Outdoor toy and bicycle manufacturer

Razor USA LLC
- Company type: Private
- Founded: June 2000; 26 years ago in Cerritos, California, U.S.
- Founder: Carlton Calvin
- Headquarters: Cerritos, California, United States

Razor USA LLC, better known as Razor, is an American designer and manufacturer of manual and electric scooters, bicycles, and personal transporters. The company was founded in Cerritos, California in 2000 by Carlton Calvin and the JD Corporation. Razor also owns the RipStik, Sole Skate, and Pocket Pros brands.

== Products ==
=== Kick scooters ===
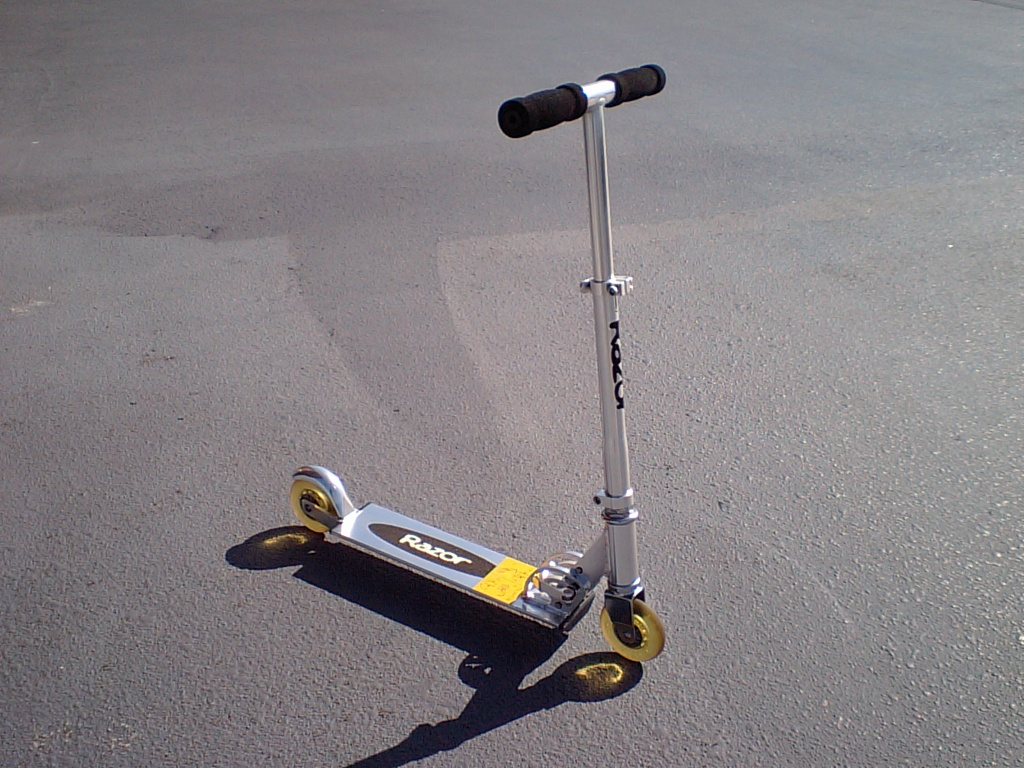
Razor A Model 1st generation, the first Razor scooter aka Old A

The first Razor scooter was manufactured by JD and distributed by The Sharper Image. Since JD founded RazorUSA, JD also began to sell scooters under the JDBUG brand.

- 10th anniversary - reproduced first Razor scooter
- A
- A2
- A3
- A5 Lux
- B - Discontinued
- Cruiser
- Folding Kiddie Kick
- Graffiti
- Hello Kitty
- Lil' Kick

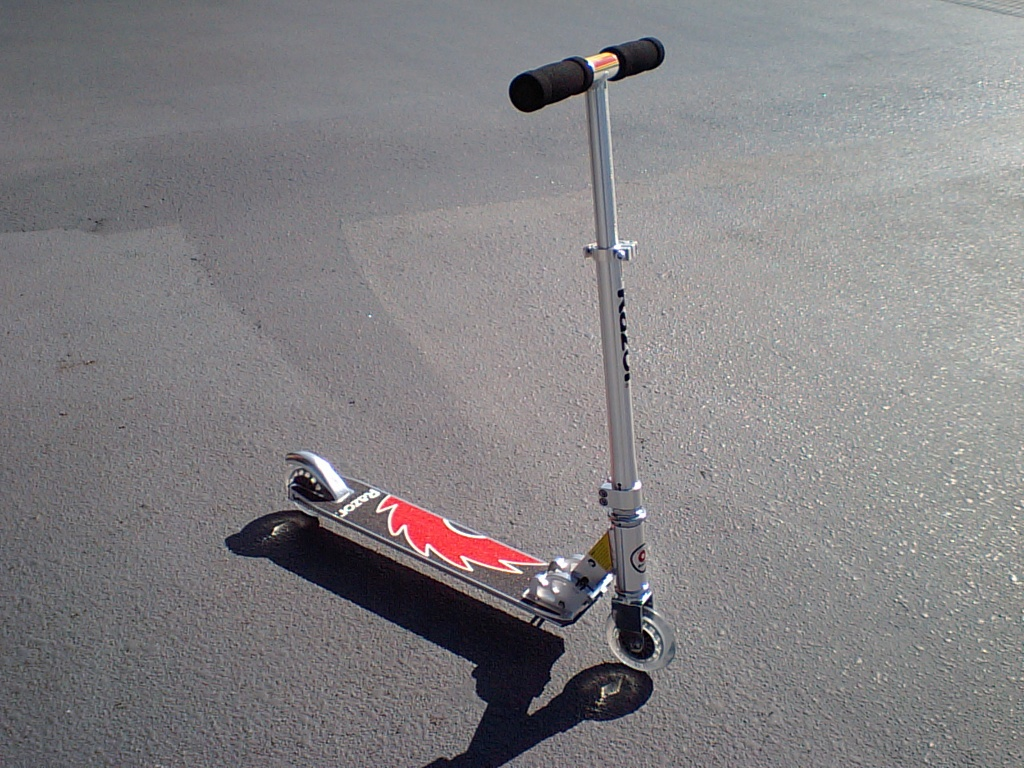
Razor Pro Model

- Pro Model
- Spark
- Spark DLX
- Sweet Pea A
- Sweet pops
- Ultra Pro
- Wild Style
- RZ Ultralite - never officially released
- Razor Pro Model DLX
- Razor Ultra Pro Model
- Razor Pro X
- Razor Pro XX
- Razor Pro XXX
- Razor Phase Two - Jason Beggs Signature Model
- Razor Phase Two - John Radtke Signature Model

=== Electric scooters ===
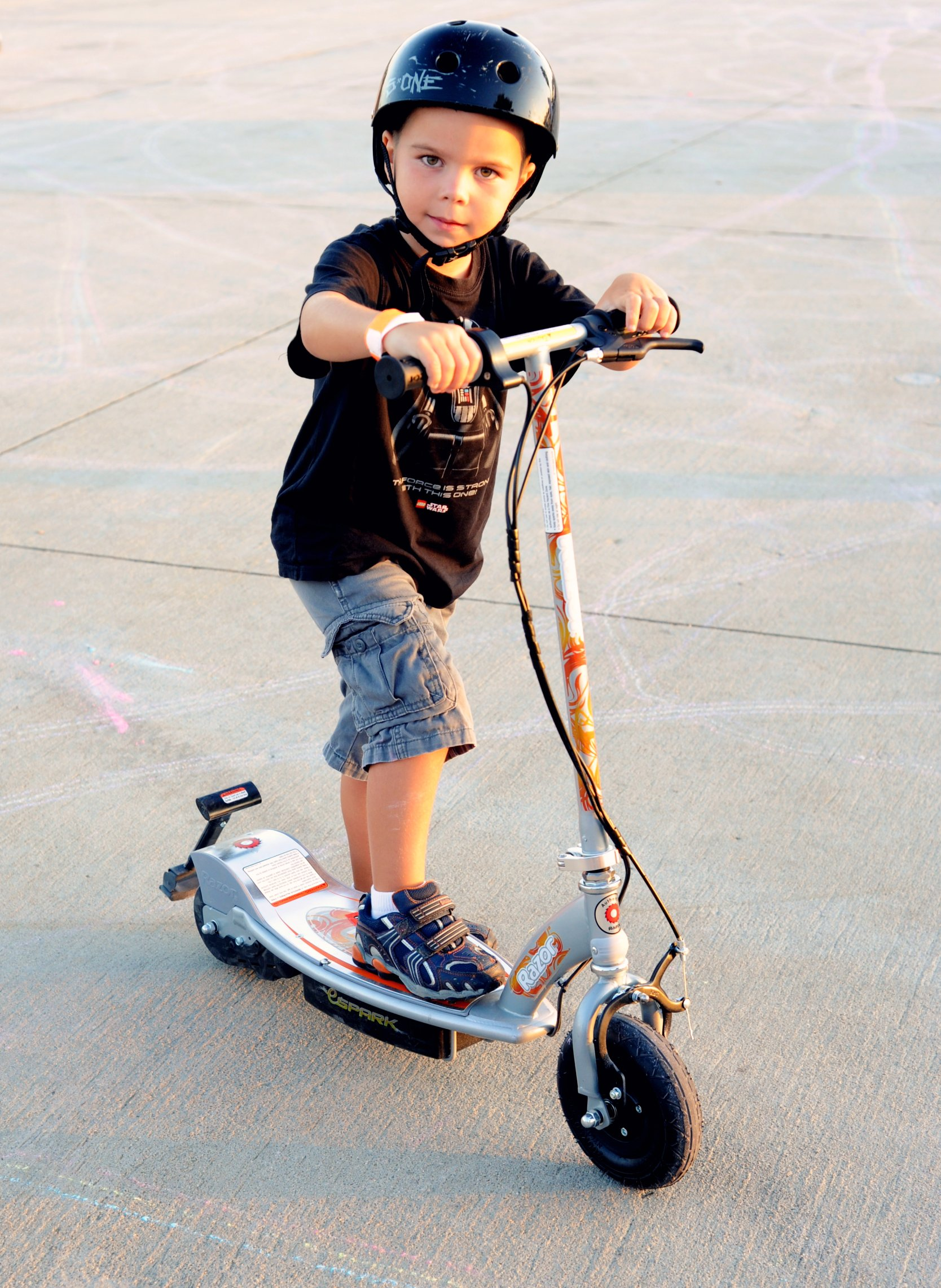
eSpark

- E90
- Power Core 90
- E100
- E100 Glow
- Sweet Pea E100
- E125
- E150
- E175
- E200
- E200S
- E225
- E275
- E300
- E300S
- Sweet Pea E300S
- E325
- eSpark
- EcoSmart Metro
- Icon ( This is the classic 2000's design with a motor that has a range up to 18 miles at a speed up to 18mph )

=== Electric ride ons ===
ATV

- Dirt Quad - children's electric four-wheeler with pneumatic knobby tires

Go-carts

- Dune Buggy
- Ground Force
- Ground Force Drifter
- Ground Force Drifter Fury

Motorcycles

- MX350 Dirt Rocket
- MX400 McGrath
- MX500 Dirt Rocket
- MX650 Dirt Rocket
- SX500 Dirt Rocket McGrath
- Pro Spec Dirt Rocket

Motorscooters

- Pocket Mod

Self-balancing hoverboards

- Hovertrax
- Hovertrax DLX

Crazy Carts

- Crazy Cart
- Crazy Cart XL

=== Caster driven scooter ===
Caster driven scooters are a modern form of three-wheeler popular during the 1970s and 80s.

=== Bicycles ===
Razor branded bicycles are provided by Kent under license. The following are freestyle bikes except as noted.

- 12" Rumble
- 16" DSX 16 - Dual suspension MTB
- MicroForce
- 18" Kobra - Freestyle
- 18" XR09 - Freestyle
- 20" Tempest - Freestyle frame
- 20" Rage - Freestyle frame
- 20" Aggressor - Freestyle frame
- 20" Hydro - BMX hydroformed lightweight aluminum frame
- 20" Two-Zero
- 20" Nebula
- 20" FS-2000
- 20" Razor Crossfire

=== Other products ===
Razor branded skateboards, pads, and helmets are provided by Kent under license.
