= Chrysler Airflite =

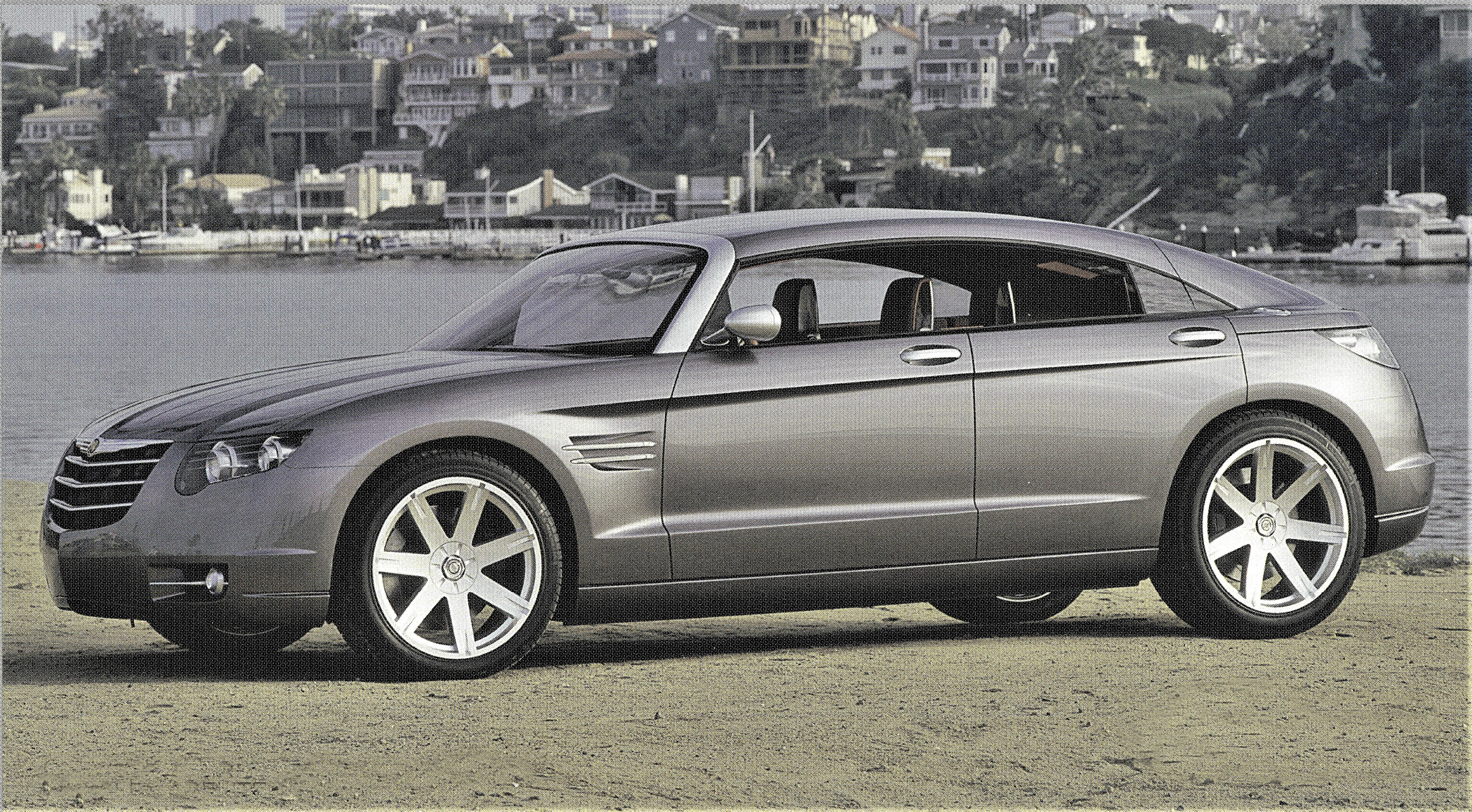

Overview
- Manufacturer: Chrysler

Body and chassis
- Class: Concept car
- Body style: 4-door coupé
- Layout: Front-engine, rear-wheel-drive
- Platform: Chrysler's LX platform

Powertrain
- Engine: 3.5 L EGG DOHC V6
- Transmission: 5-speed automatic

The Chrysler Airflite was a concept car created by the American car manufacturer Chrysler. It was first introduced at the 2003 Geneva Auto Show. The Airflite's looks were a combination of a sporty design, stylish looks, and some of the design cues from another one of Chrysler's cars, the Crossfire.

== Design ==
The Chrysler Airflite was based on a shortened version of Chrysler's LX platform, which was used on the Chrysler 300. The Airflite was powered by a 90° V6 engine. The rest of the Airflite's engine power and torque is still unknown to the public.

The major styling approach of the Airflite that typically seen on a sporty two-door coupé model; however, it had the practicality and function of a four-door sedan.

The Airflite blended the design of the Chrysler Crossfire and Pacifica in its exterior design. Most of the looks of the Airflite (mainly the front and rear) were based on the Crossfire. The seven-spoke road wheel design was based on the Crossfire, as was the satin trimmed windshield.

The interior of the Airflite was very spacious and upscale. A dominant center spine connected the interior from the dashboard all the way to the back. The floor was stepped up behind the rear seats to create a raised cargo area.

Major styling cues from the Airflite eventually made it into the 2007 Chrysler Sebring sedan.

== Original Airflyte ==
Airflite is a variation of Airflyte, which described the functional styling and monocoque construction of a car made by Nash Motors (a company that merged with Hudson Motors to form American Motors (AMC), which was acquired by Chrysler in 1987). The Nash "Airflyte" was introduced in 1949, featuring a roomy interior and an advanced design. Unusual for the time, its aerodynamic shape was developed in a wind tunnel to reduce the car's drag coefficient, which resulted in the new Nash Airflyte having a smooth, wide, and low body.

== See also ==
- Chrysler Crossfire
- Chrysler Pacifica
