= Chrysler 200C EV =

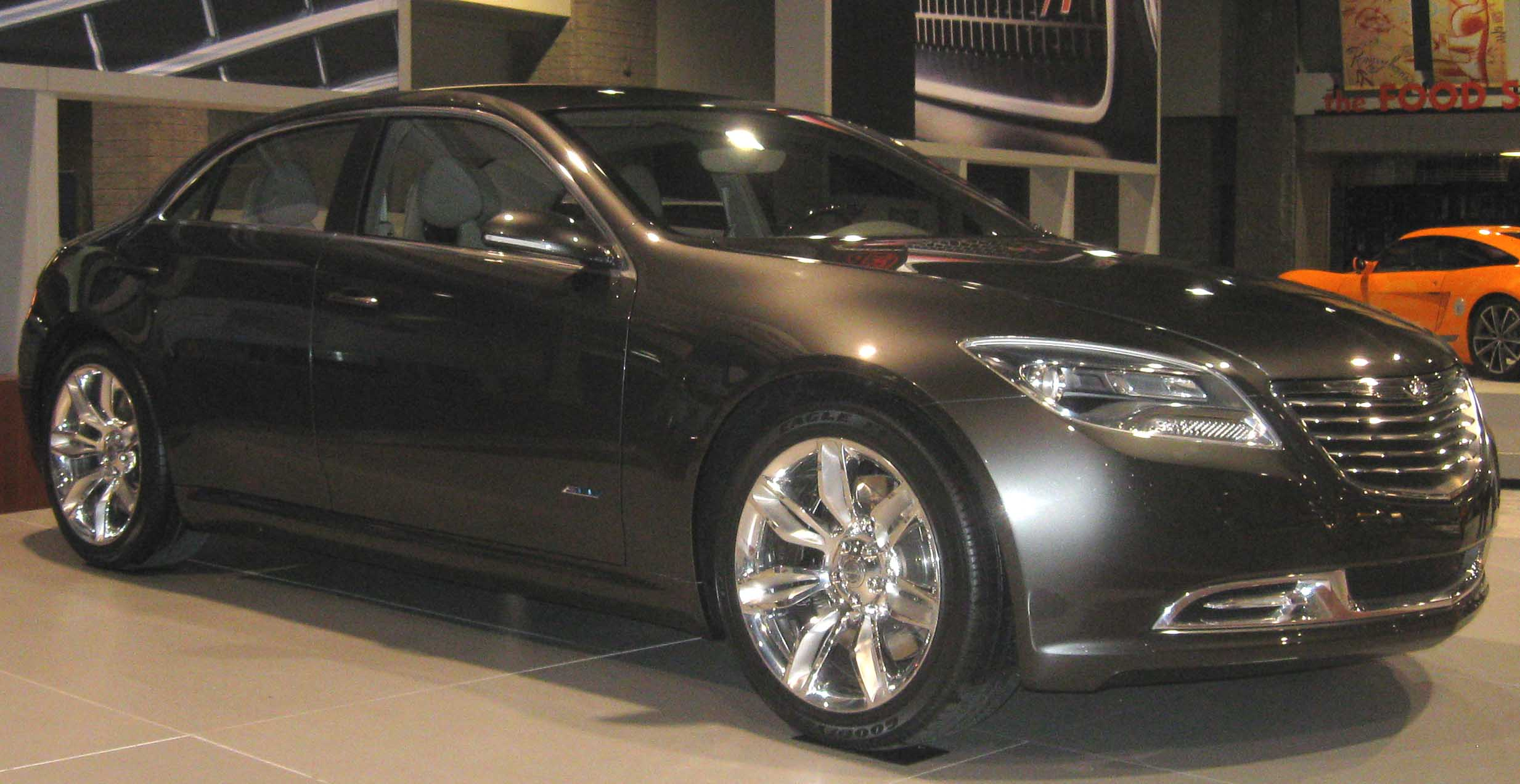

Overview
- Manufacturer: Chrysler
- Production: 2009 (Concept car)

Body and chassis
- Class: Mid-size car
- Body style: 4-door sedan
- Layout: Front-engine, rear-wheel-drive
- Platform: Chrysler LC platform

Powertrain
- Engine: 0.9L Fiat TwinAir Turbocharged I2
- Electric motor: Permanent magnet electric motor (rear-wheel drive)
- Power output: 200 kW (270 PS; 270 bhp)
- Transmission: Single-speed fixed
- Hybrid drivetrain: Extended Range PHEV (electric motor and gasoline engine)
- Battery: lithium ion battery

Dimensions
- Wheelbase: 116.1 in (2,949 mm)
- Length: 192.1 in (4,879 mm)
- Width: 73.6 in (1,869 mm)
- Height: 57.3 in (1,455 mm)

Chronology
- Predecessor: Chrysler Sebring Sedan

The Chrysler 200C EV was a plug-in hybrid electric concept car built by the U.S. automaker Chrysler.

== Overview ==
The vehicle was based on the shortened Chrysler LX platform.

The rear-wheel-drive sedan included gasoline engine rated 268 bhp (200 kW) and a 74 bhp (55 kW) electric motor with an electric only range of 40 miles (64 km) and a combined range of 400 miles (640 km). P245/45R20 front and rear tires. The car had a 0–100 km/h (0–62 mph) acceleration of approximately 7 seconds, with top speed of over 120 mph (190 km/h).

The interior incorporated uConnect features controlled via a panoramic multimedia touch screen. It included a "teen mode" which warned of erratic driving or going out of a specified range, and limited the maximum speed.

The vehicle was unveiled in 2009 North American International Auto Show.

== Design ==
The exterior design was led by Nick Malachowski. The interior was designed by Chrysler LLC's Advance Interior Design Studio, led by Ryan Patrick Joyce. The vehicle flooring was inspired by a Zen rock garden.
