= Dodge Magnum =

Car model

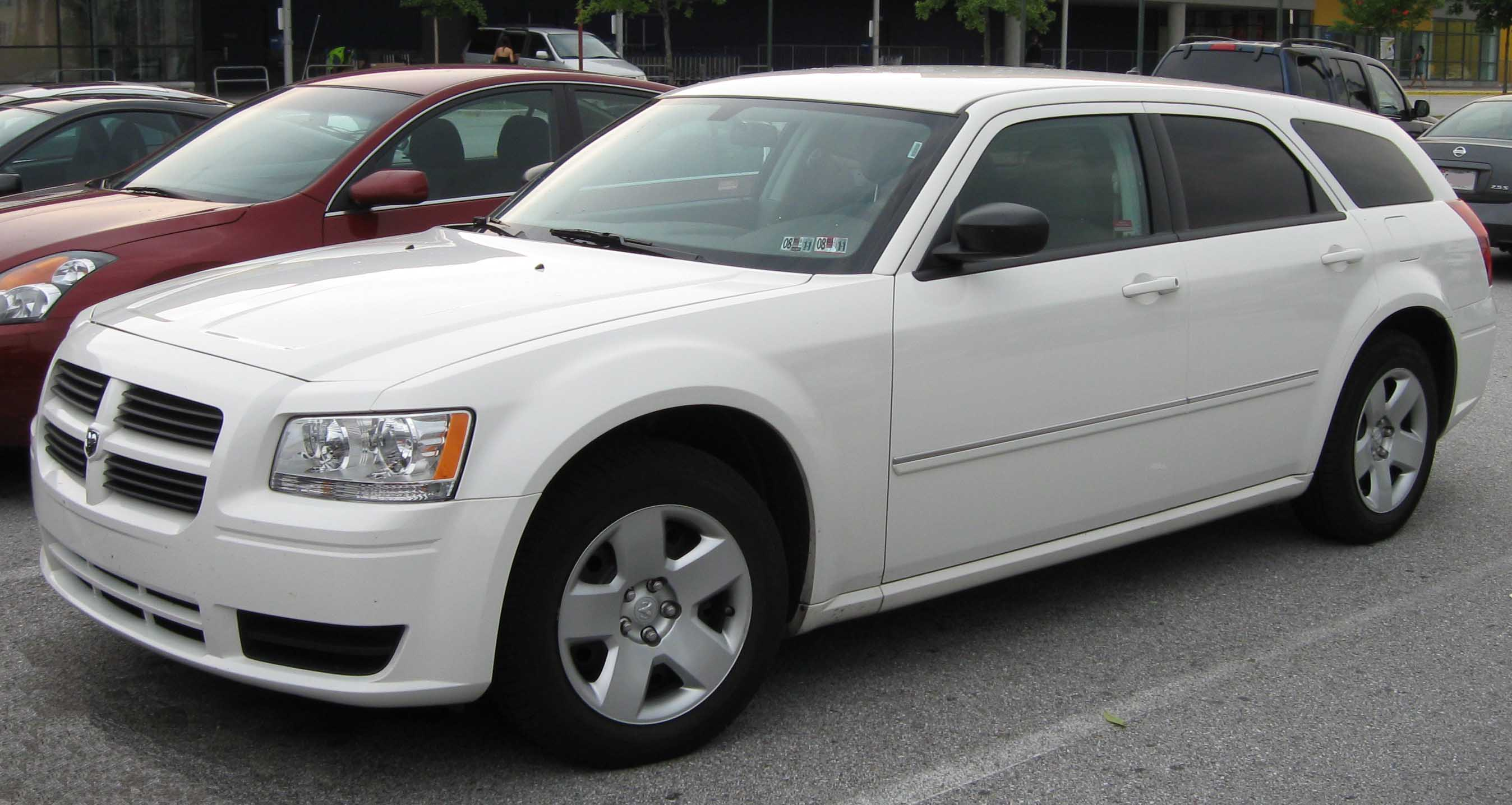
- 2008 Dodge Magnum SE, Stone White

Overview
- Manufacturer: Chrysler Corporation (1978–1988); DaimlerChrysler (2005–2007); Chrysler LLC (2007–2008)
- Production: 1978–1979; 1979–1981; 1981–1988; 2005–2008
- Model years: 1978–1979; 1979–1981; 1981–1988; 2005–2008

The Dodge Magnum nameplate was used by Dodge for various models for various time periods and markets — beginning with a large Chrysler B platform 2-door coupe from 1978-1979 in the United States and Canada. For model years 2005-2008, the Magnum was a station wagon on the rear-wheel drive Chrysler LX platform, manufactured in Canada and marketed on the American and Canadian market.

In Brazil, the Magnum was a top-of-the-line version of the local Dodge Dart, produced from 1979 to 1981.

In Mexico, the Dodge Magnum was a sporty rear-wheel drive two-door car based on Chrysler's M-body (American Dodge Diplomat/Plymouth Gran Fury). From 1983 to 1988 Dodge marketed a sporty two-door K-car as the "Magnum", with an available turbocharger engine from 1984 on.

== US and Canada (1978–1979) ==
Dodge Magnum (US & Canada, 1978–1979)
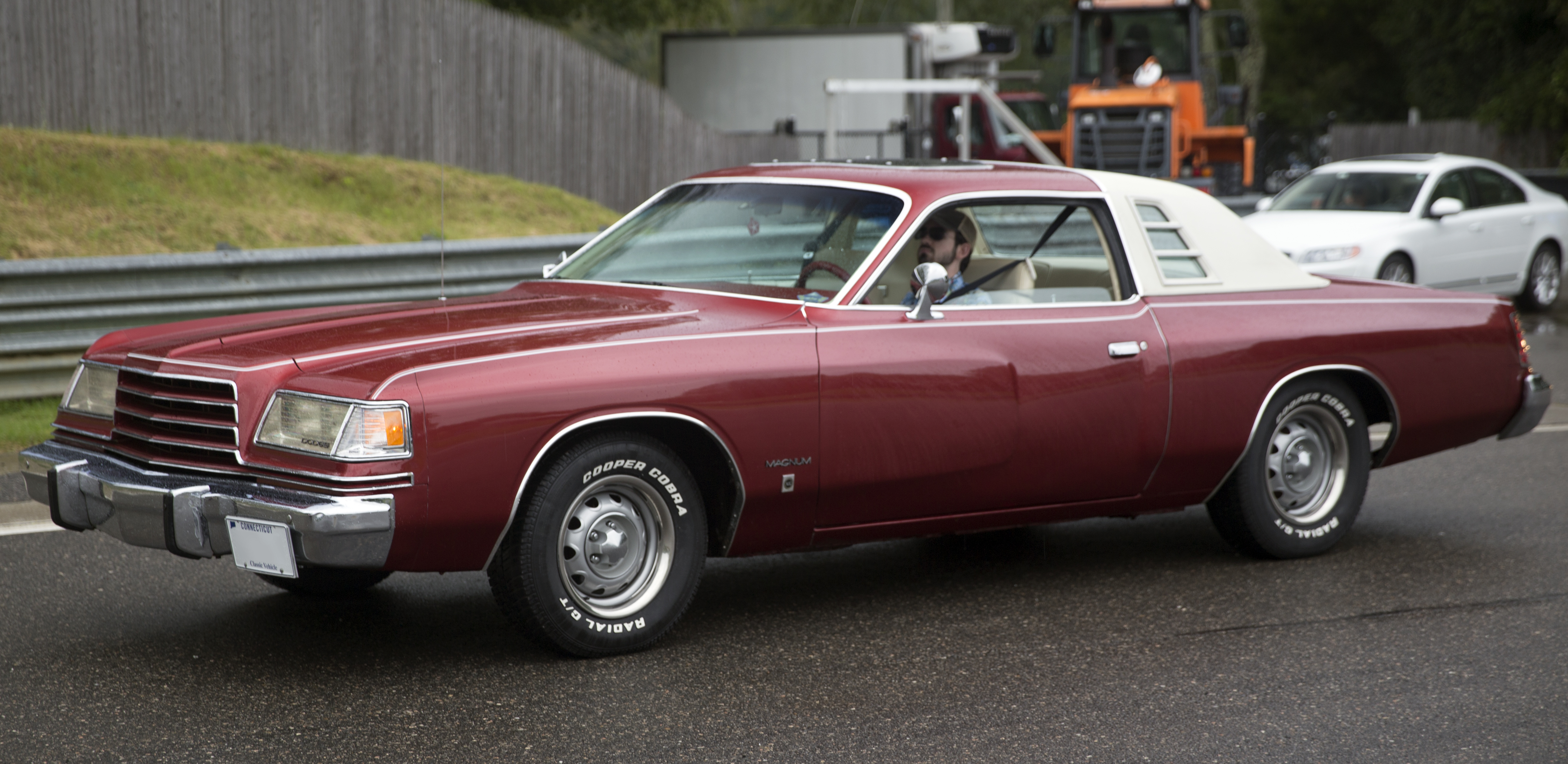

Overview
- Also called: Dodge XE
- Model years: 1978–1979
- Assembly: Canada: Windsor, Ontario (Windsor Assembly)

Body and chassis
- Class: Mid-size
- Body style: 2-door coupe
- Layout: FR layout
- Platform: B-body
- Related: Chrysler 300 (1979); Chrysler Cordoba; Dodge Charger; Dodge Monaco; Plymouth Fury

Powertrain
- Engine: 318 cu in (5.2 L) LA V8; 360 cu in (5.9 L) LA V8; 400 cu in (6.6 L) B V8
- Transmission: 3-speed A727 automatic

Dimensions
- Wheelbase: 115.0 in (2,921 mm)
- Length: 215.7 in (5,479 mm)
- Width: 77.2 in (1,961 mm)
- Height: 53.1 in (1,349 mm)

Chronology
- Predecessor: Dodge Charger
- Successor: Dodge Mirada

The Magnum was introduced for 1978 to supplement the Dodge Charger. It was sold in two forms, the "XE" and the "GT" and was the last vehicle to use the long running Chrysler B platform. The appearance was somewhat of a rounded off Charger, and was in response to getting a car that would be eligible for NASCAR that would be more aerodynamic, something that the 1975–1978 Charger was not. Styling features included four rectangular headlights behind retractable clear covers, with narrow opera windows, and an optional T-bar or power sunroof. The Magnum was well-featured with power steering, brakes and seats; the suspension included Chrysler's standard adjustable, longitudinal torsion bars, lower trailing links, and front and rear anti-sway bars. The base engine was the 318 cu in (5.2 L) V8 with Lean-Burn, while two and four-barrel carbureted 360 cu in (5.9 L) and 400 cu in (6.6 L) V8s were optional; weight was nearly 3,900 lb (1,800 kg).

During the start of the 1979 model year, the 400 V8 engine was dropped from the options list as Chrysler stopped producing big-block V8 engines in production cars during the end of 1978 model year. A performance model, the "GT" had been available with the 400 cu in (6.6 L) V8 during the previous model year (1978) and the "E58" police interceptor 360 V8 engine producing 195 hp (145 kW)was available during the 1979 model year along with HD suspension, special axle, special "GT" badging and a "turned metal" dash applique. Technology was advanced for the time with an onboard spark control computer from inception, electronic ignition, and a lockup torque converter. During the end of the 1979 model year, the mid-size B-body Dodge Magnum (along with its mid-size B-body based Chrysler Cordoba counterpart) was discontinued, as was with just the Magnum name itself, in favor of what would become a smaller, all newly designed, M-body platform based Mirada coupe (which also would be shared along with what would become its M-body platform based Chrysler Cordoba coupe counterpart as well) all during the next four model years (1980–1983). Only 3,704 1979 Dodge Magnum coupes included a T-Top.

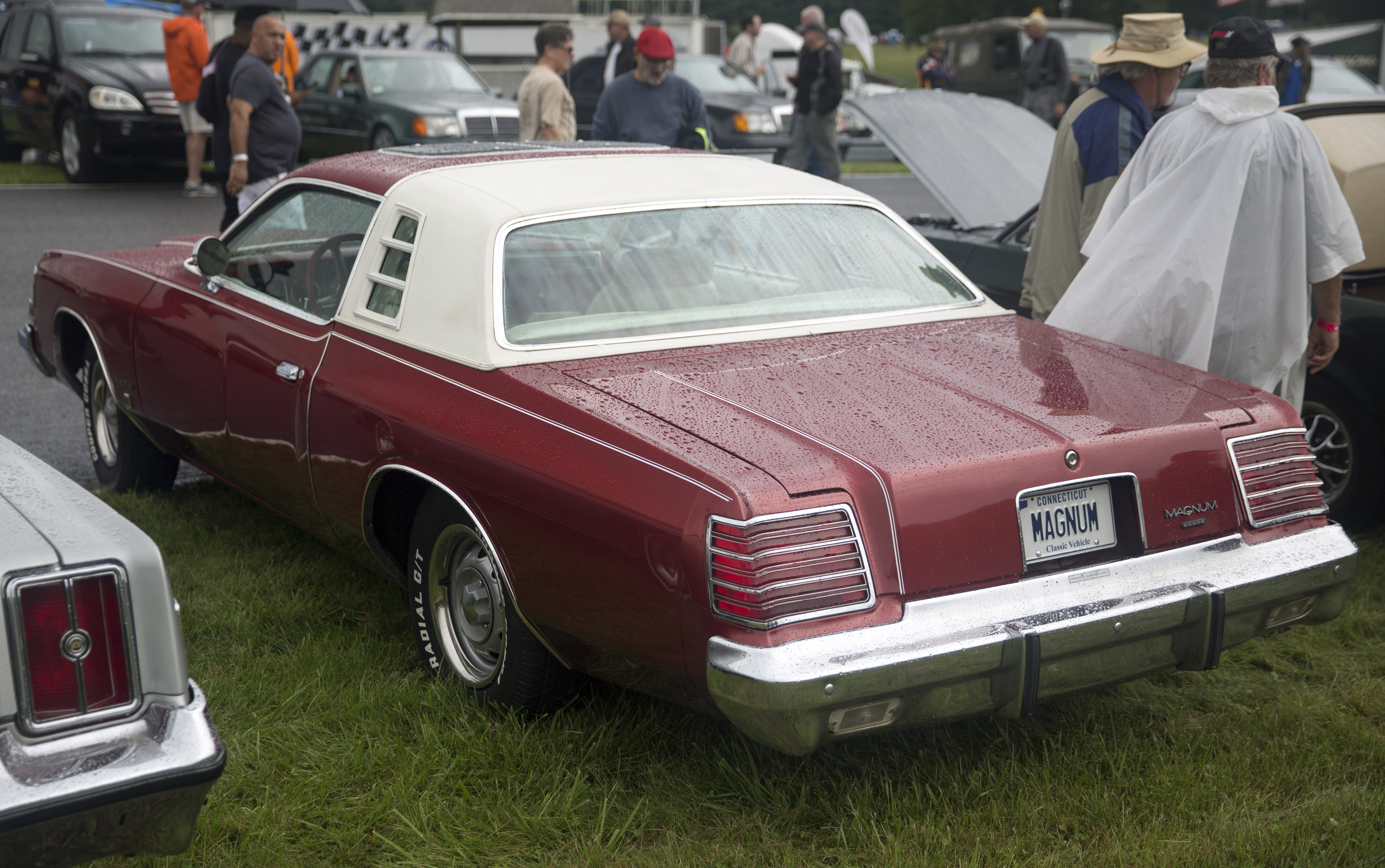
1978 Dodge Magnum XE, rear view

=== NASCAR ===
The mid-size B-body 1978–1979 Dodge Magnum coupe in the United States and Canada was an addition to Chrysler's line up that allowed Richard Petty to continue racing with a Mopar. For the 1978 NASCAR season, the 1974 Charger that Chrysler teams had continued to use was no longer eligible for competition. Chrysler worked on several car designs to smooth out the current 1975 bodied Charger into something that would be reasonably aerodynamic for the big racetracks and the Magnum design was settled on in the summer of 1977 for use in the 1978 racing season. While not as aerodynamic as the 1974 Charger body, the shape of the Magnum showed promise, and the Petty Enterprises built test cars reached 190 mph (310 km/h) on test runs. At first it seemed that out on the tracks the cars ran well with Petty almost winning his Daytona 125 (finishing second), and leading over 30 laps of the Daytona 500 until a blown front tire caused him to wreck. However, the lack of factory development support of the small-block Chrysler 360 V8 as a race engine was becoming more of a problem, and in high speed racing traffic the Magnum did not handle well. Petty was particularly harsh in his criticism of the car - before the season he declared, "The Magnum is undriveable at 190 MPH."

By the latter half of the 1978 season, Petty and Neil Bonnett (the two top Mopar teams) gave up on the car's inconsistent performance and switched to Chevrolets and Oldsmobiles, leaving independent drivers Buddy Arrington (who bought a few of Petty's Magnums, along with some parts), Frank Warren, and Country singer Marty Robbins to soldier on without any substantial factory support (Chrysler did provide sheet metal and some engine parts to teams driving Magnums). From August 1978, two to five independent teams showed up with Magnums in NASCAR races, until January 1981, when NASCAR switched to smaller bodied cars. The Magnum never enjoyed the racing heritage of its predecessors, but it was not without its own achievements. Petty scored 7 top five finishes in his 17 races with the car, and Bonnett won three poles and scored 5 top five finishes with his. Petty recognized the Magnum with a commemorative decal, depicting his famous number 43 emblazoned on a Magnum for his 1992 Fan Appreciation Tour. Though Petty never won a race in a Magnum, his son, Kyle Petty drove one of his father's year-old Dodge Magnums in his first race (1979 Daytona ARCA 200), and won. Kyle raced in five NASCAR races using the left-over Magnums in 1979, but wrecked them beyond reasonable repair by the 1980 Daytona 125. As of December 2012, only two NASCAR Magnums still existed; one (an ex-Petty car) resides in the Talladega NASCAR museum, and the other; (Marty Robbins' 1978 Magnum No. 42) has been restored and is owned by a private party in southern California.

Production Figures:

Dodge Magnum Production Figures
| | Yearly Total |
|---|---|
| 1978 | 47,827 |
| 1979 | 25,367 |
| Total | 73,194 |

== Brazil (1979–1981) ==
Dodge Magnum (Brazil)
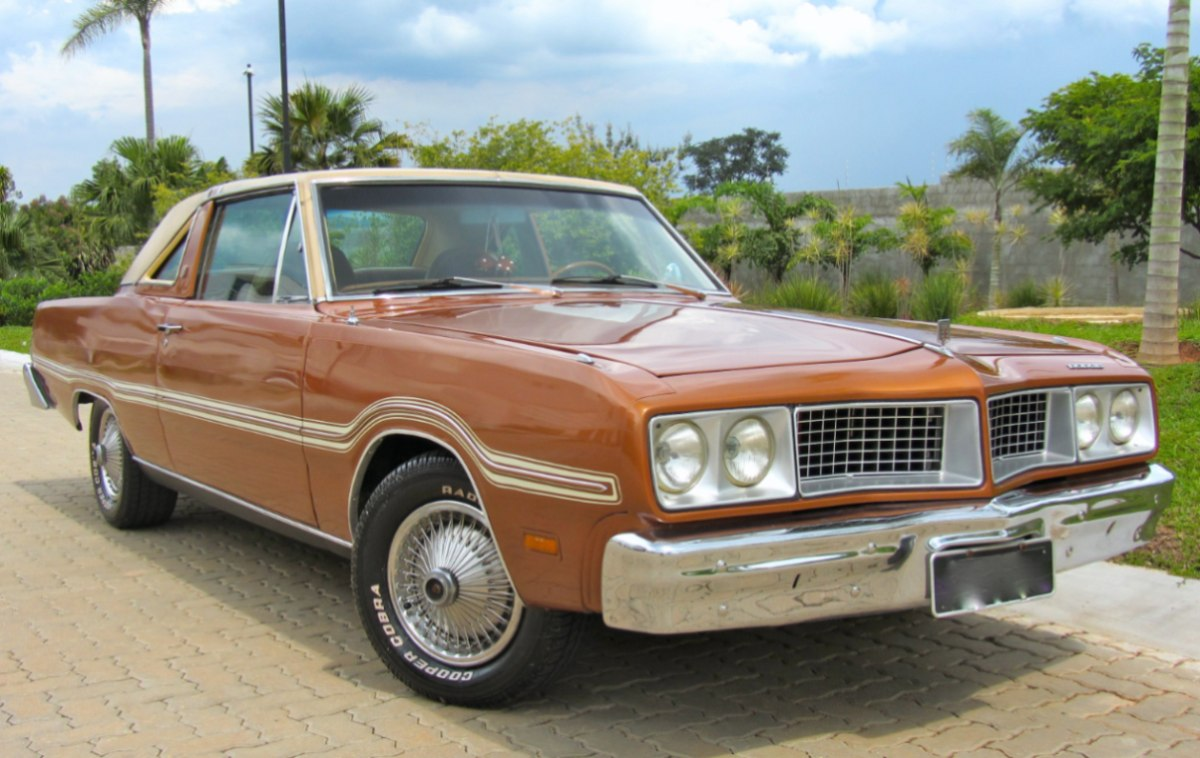

Overview
- Production: 1979–1981
- Assembly: Brazil: São Bernardo do Campo, São Paulo

Body and chassis
- Body style: 2-door coupe
- Layout: FR layout
- Platform: A-body
- Related: Dodge Dart

Powertrain
- Engine: 318 cu in (5.2 L) LA V8
- Transmission: 4-speed manual, 3-speed automatic

From 1969 until 1981 the Dodge Dart was produced in the old Simca Factory in São Bernardo do Campo, São Paulo, Brazil. More than 92,000 cars were sold in this period. They were built with minor changes from the original model, starting in 1969, and were all largely based on the 1968 Dart GT (and GTS). For its last three years of production, a two-door upper trim level version of the Dart was sold as the Magnum, featuring the 318 cu in V8 engine used in all Dodge coupé and sedan models in Brazil. A unique fiberglass front fascia that included four headlights to give it a more modern look was used, while the rear end was very similar to the 1975 American Dart (the Dart model from the same year having been identical to the Swinger from USA). The Magnum (top of the line) was sold as a separate model from the Dart (bottom line), despite being technically almost identical to the Dart.

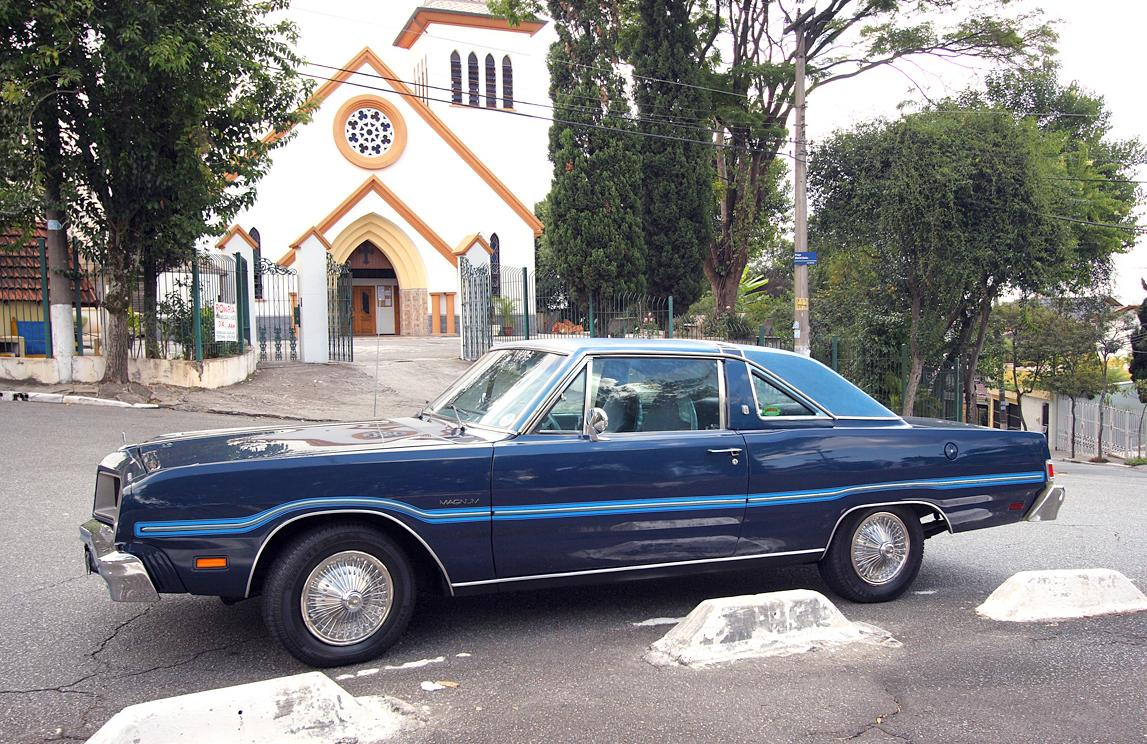
1979 Dodge Magnum (Brazil)

The Dodge was well received in Brazil. The coupe and sedan models in Brazil were (all variations from the Dart 1968 model): Dart [1969–1981] (as a 2-door coupé from 1970 until 1981 or as a four-door sedan from 1969 until 1981), sporting but lower priced Dart SE, better equipped Dart DeLuxo (two or four doors), Gran Coupé (more luxurious yet than the Dart DeLuxo, with two doors only), Gran Sedan (above the Dart DeLuxo model, with four doors only), Charger R/T [1971–1980] (coupé bodywork only, from 1971 to 1980 it was the top model in the sport segment), LeBaron (replacing the 'Gran Sedan' with four-door sedan body, from 1979 to 1981) and Magnum (replacement for the Dart Gran Coupé, Brazil's top model in the luxury segment from 1979 to 1981).

== Mexico (1981–1988) ==
Dodge Magnum (Mexico, first generation)
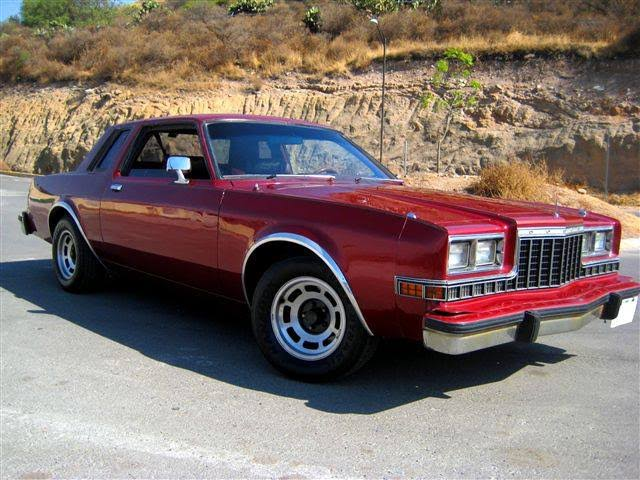

Overview
- Production: 1981–1982
- Assembly: Mexico: Toluca (Toluca Car Assembly)

Body and chassis
- Body style: 2-door coupe
- Layout: FR layout
- Platform: M-body
- Related: Dodge Diplomat; Plymouth Gran Fury; Chrysler LeBaron; Plymouth Caravelle Salon

Powertrain
- Engine: 360 cu in (5.9 L) LA V8
- Transmission: 4-speed A833 manual 3-speed A727 automatic

Chronology
- Predecessor: Dodge Valiant Super Bee

=== First generation ===
In 1980, the F-body cars were discontinued in Mexico, as well in the U.S., so the compact cars Dodge Dart (using the front of the Volaré and the rear of the Aspen), Valiant Volaré (using the front of the Aspen and the rear of the Volaré), and sporty Valiant Super Bee, were dropped for this year.

In 1979, Chrysler de México introduced the Chrysler LeBaron based on the M-body platform, and two years later it introduced the Dodge Diplomat as the Dodge Dart. These were very similar to the American Plymouth Gran Fury in appearance and trim, but had Chrysler's Rallye wheels instead of deluxe wheel covers. Chrysler de México used a small platform and the Magnum name, equipping it with 360 CID (5.9 L) V8 engine rated at 300 hp (224 kW), with a Carter ThermoQuad four barrel (four-choke) carburetor), Mopar oil cooler, a 3-speed A727 automatic transmission (A833 4-speed manual optional), heavy-duty suspension, power brakes, stabilizer bars in the front and rear and a Dana 44 differential with positive pass and posi-traction. All of the window trim was flat black; with only the bumpers and the grille chromed. Both the front fascia and the front fenders wore "Magnum" lettering, with a 5.9 L decal on the fenders as well. The Mexican Dodge Magnum was offered only for the 1981–1982 model years.

=== Second generation ===
Dodge Magnum 400 / Magnum K (Mexico, second generation)
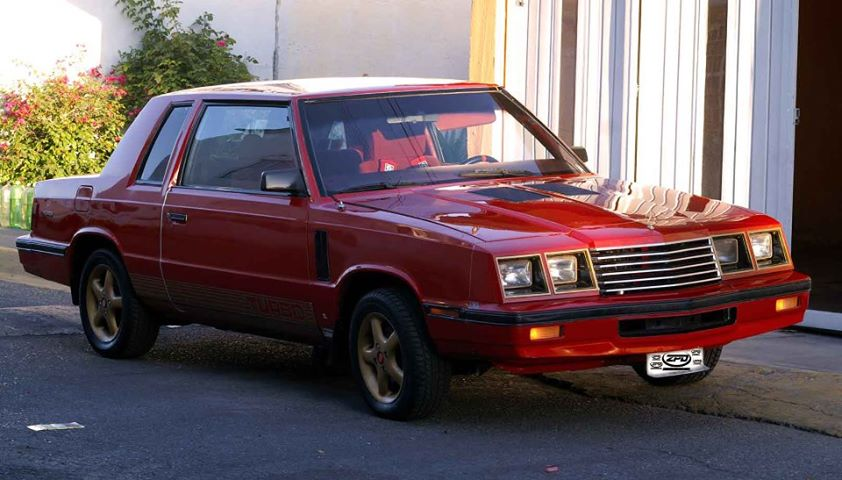

Overview
- Production: 1983–1988
- Assembly: Mexico: Toluca (Toluca Car Assembly)

Body and chassis
- Body style: 2-door coupe
- Layout: FF layout
- Platform: K-body
- Related: Dodge 400 (U.S.); Dodge Aries (U.S.); Plymouth Caravelle (U.S.)

Powertrain
- Engine: 2.2 L Chrysler SOHC K-Trans-4 I4; 2.2 L Chrysler Turbo SOHC K-Trans-4 I4; 2.5 L Chrysler SOHC K-Trans-4 I4; 2.5 L Chrysler Turbo SOHC K-Trans-4 I4
- Transmission: 4-speed manual 5-speed manual 3-speed automatic

Chronology
- Successor: Chrysler Shadow GTS

The K-car based Mexican Dodge Magnum was a sporty 2-door compact, based on the Dodge Aries coupe body (with blackout 1982–1985 Dodge 400 grille in 1983–1985 and a blackout 1986–1988 Plymouth Caravelle grille in 1986–1988) offered from 1983 to 1988 with available turbocharger ("TurboChrysler" engine) from 1984 on. Four engines were offered for the Mexican Dodge Magnum K: a 2.2 L SOHC I-4 (K-Trans-4, 1983–86), a turbocharged 2.2 L SOHC I-4 (1984–86) and two 2.5 L SOHC I-4s, with and without turbocharger (1987–88).

When it was introduced, the Mexican Dodge Magnum 400 Turbo was advertised as "Mexico's fastest car" in the TV commercials of the time, and it surely was in 1985, when the "Fox" (1979–84) 5.0 L Mexican Ford Mustang was dropped from the catalog of Ford Mexico. The Mexican front-wheel drive Magnum was officially called "Dodge Magnum 400" between 1983 and 1984, as it was a sporty Mexican variation of the American Dodge 400 of the early eighties (without the vinyl roof of the US version and with high output 2.2 L engine (available turbocharger from 1984 on), heavy-duty suspension, sporty wheels, tires, dash, steering wheel, console, shifter and seats). In 1984, the Mexican Magnum 400 Turbo was the closest thing to an American Dodge Daytona Turbo south of the border. For 1985, the "400" suffix was dropped. For the 1987 season, the turbocharger received an intercooler and the power from the turbo engine changed from 140 to 150 hp (112 kW). The K-car based Magnum was replaced by the Mexican Chrysler Shadow GTS for the 1989 model year.

== Chrysler LX platform (2005–2008) ==
=== US and Canada ===
Dodge Magnum (2005–2008)
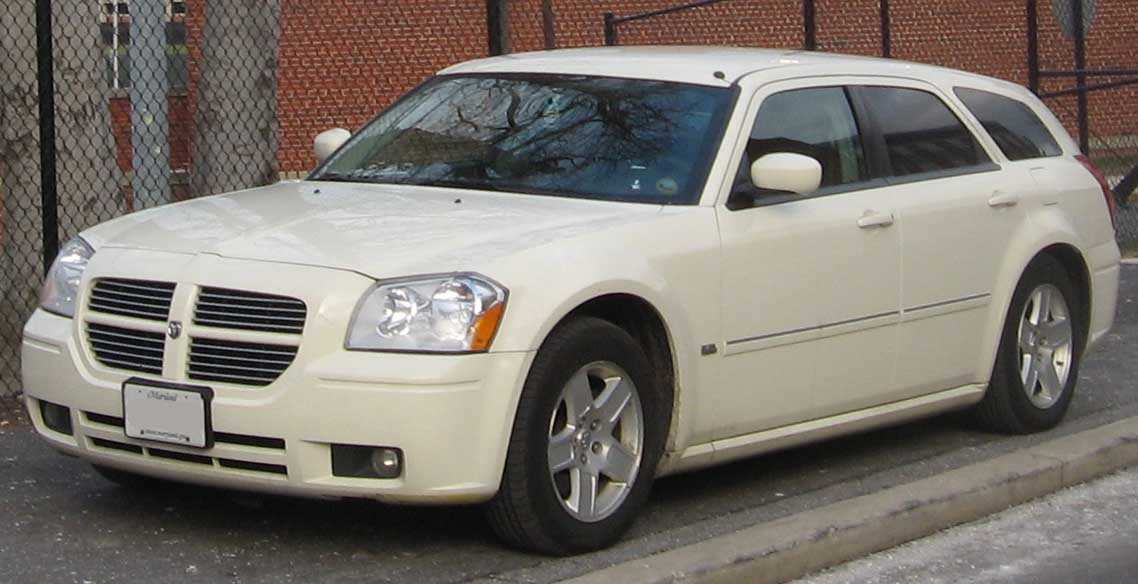
- Pre-facelift

Overview
- Production: February 3, 2004 – September 25, 2008
- Model years: 2005–2008
- Assembly: Canada: Brampton, Ontario (Brampton Assembly)
- Designer: Ralph Gilles (2001); Freeman Thomas (2001)

Body and chassis
- Class: Full-size
- Body style: 5-door station wagon
- Layout: Front engine, rear-wheel drive / four-wheel drive
- Platform: Chrysler LX platform
- Related: Chrysler 300; Dodge Charger; Mercedes-Benz E-Class (W211)

Powertrain
- Engine: 2.7 L (167 cu in) EER V6; 3.5 L (215 cu in) EGG V6; 5.7 L (345 cu in) EZB HEMI V8; 6.1 L (370 cu in) ESF HEMI V8
- Transmission: 4-speed 42RLE automatic 5-speed W5A580 automatic

Dimensions
- Wheelbase: 120.0 in (3,048 mm)
- Length: 197.7 in (5,022 mm)
- Width: 74.1 in (1,882 mm)
- Height: 2005-07: 58.4 in (1,483 mm); 2008: 58.3 in (1,481 mm); SRT8: 57.9 in (1,471 mm)

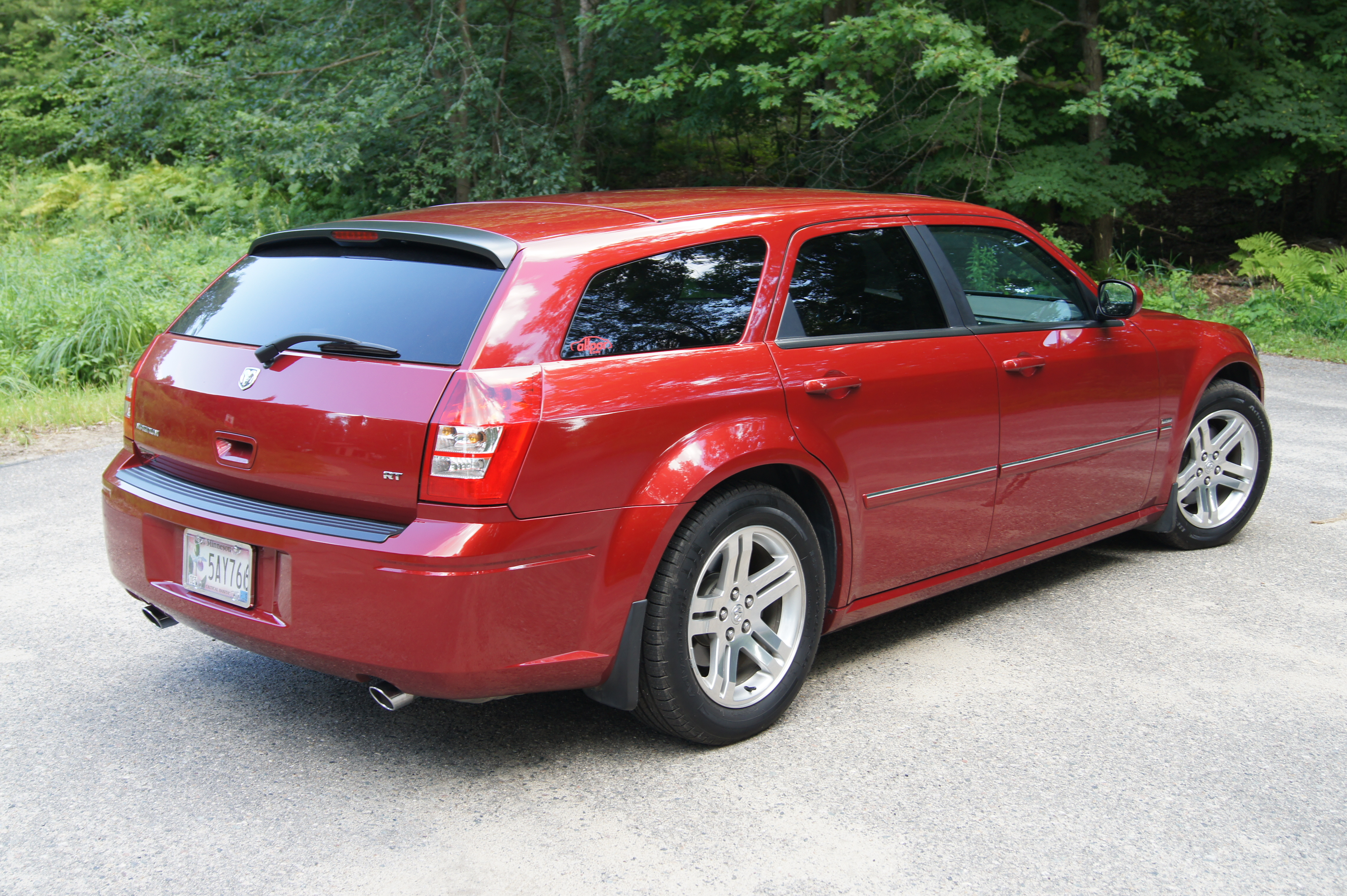
2005 Dodge Magnum RT, Inferno Red (US)

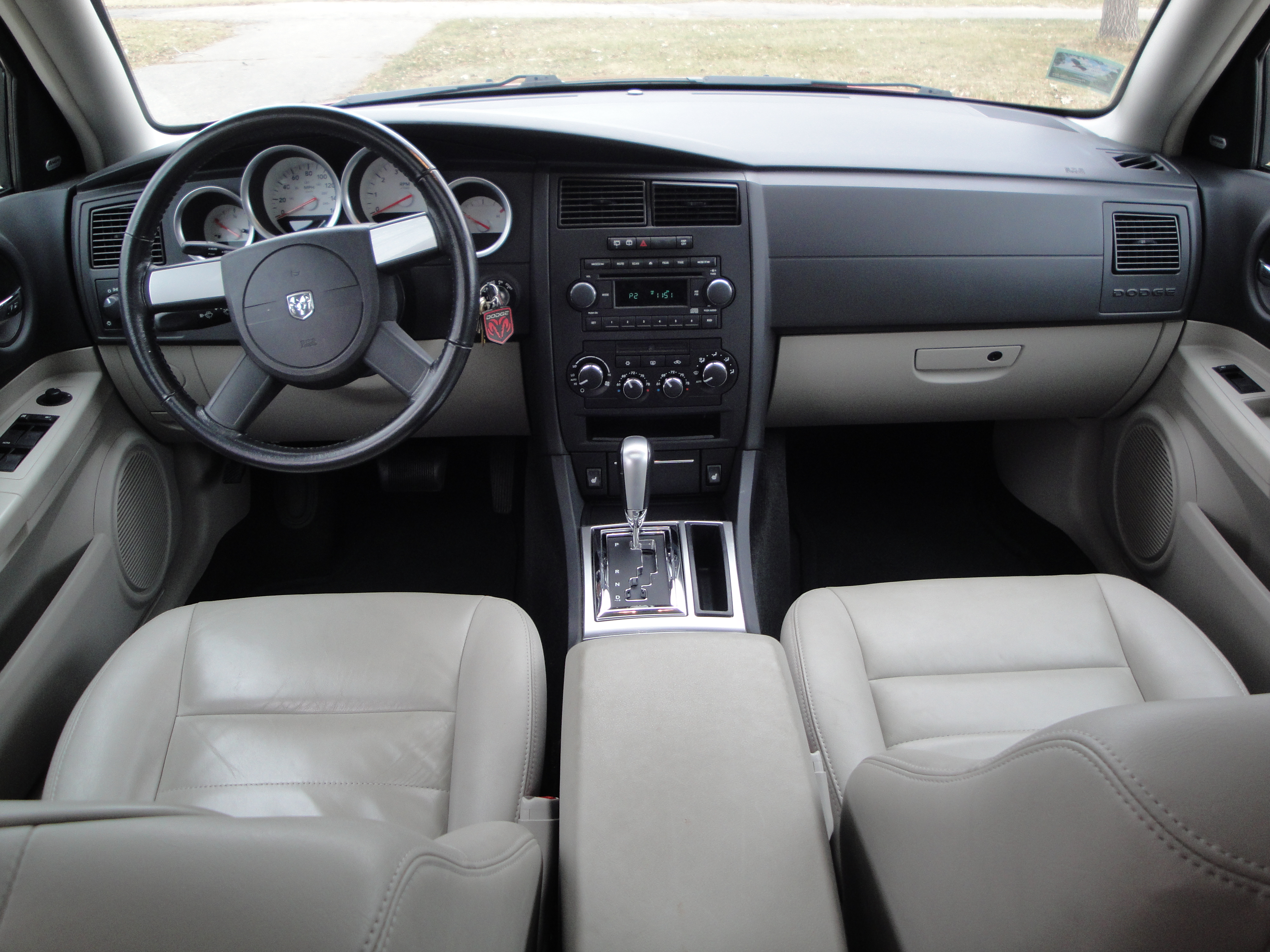
Interior

The Magnum name was revived in 2004 for the 2005 model year, as a station wagon based on the Chrysler LX platform. The Magnum had four engine options; the SE features the 190 hp (142 kW) 2.72 L LH V6, the SXT had the 250 hp (190 kW) 3.5 L V6, and the RT had the new 340 hp (254 kW) 5.7 L Hemi V8. The SRT8 has a 425 hp (317 kW) 6.1 L Hemi engine. All-wheel drive became an option in 2005 on SXT and RT models. The SRT8, AWD SXT, and the RT use a Mercedes-Benz-derived 5-speed automatic transmission, while all other models use a four-speed automatic. The Magnum was manufactured at the Brampton Assembly Plant, near Toronto, Ontario, Canada, from 2004 to 2008.

The Dodge Magnum is based on the rear-wheel-drive Chrysler LX platform with Chrysler executives confirming that structural elements of the car's foundation such as the toe board, safety cage architecture, as well as the load-path philosophy shared by then-partner, Mercedes-Benz.

Mercedes also confirmed that several individual components of the car are derived from the Mercedes-Benz E-Class (W211) and S-Class of the era, including: the rear suspension cradle and 5-link independent rear suspension design derived from E-Class, a double-wishbone front suspension design with short-and-long arm front suspension geometry derived from the Mercedes-Benz S-Class (W220), the 5-Speed NAG1 W5A580 transmission (SRT8, AWD SXT, and the RT), rear differential, driveshaft, ESP & ABS systems, steering system, the CAN Bus electrical architecture, cabin electronics including several other electronic modules, switchgear such as the cruise control and turn signal combination stalk, seat controls, seat frames, and the wiring harness. Later models also feature a Mercedes-derived laser key ignition system in place of the traditional metal key. AWD models also used Mercedes-Benz's 4MATIC system, including transfer case components.

The Magnum placed on Car and Driver's Ten Best list for 2005.

=== SRT8 ===
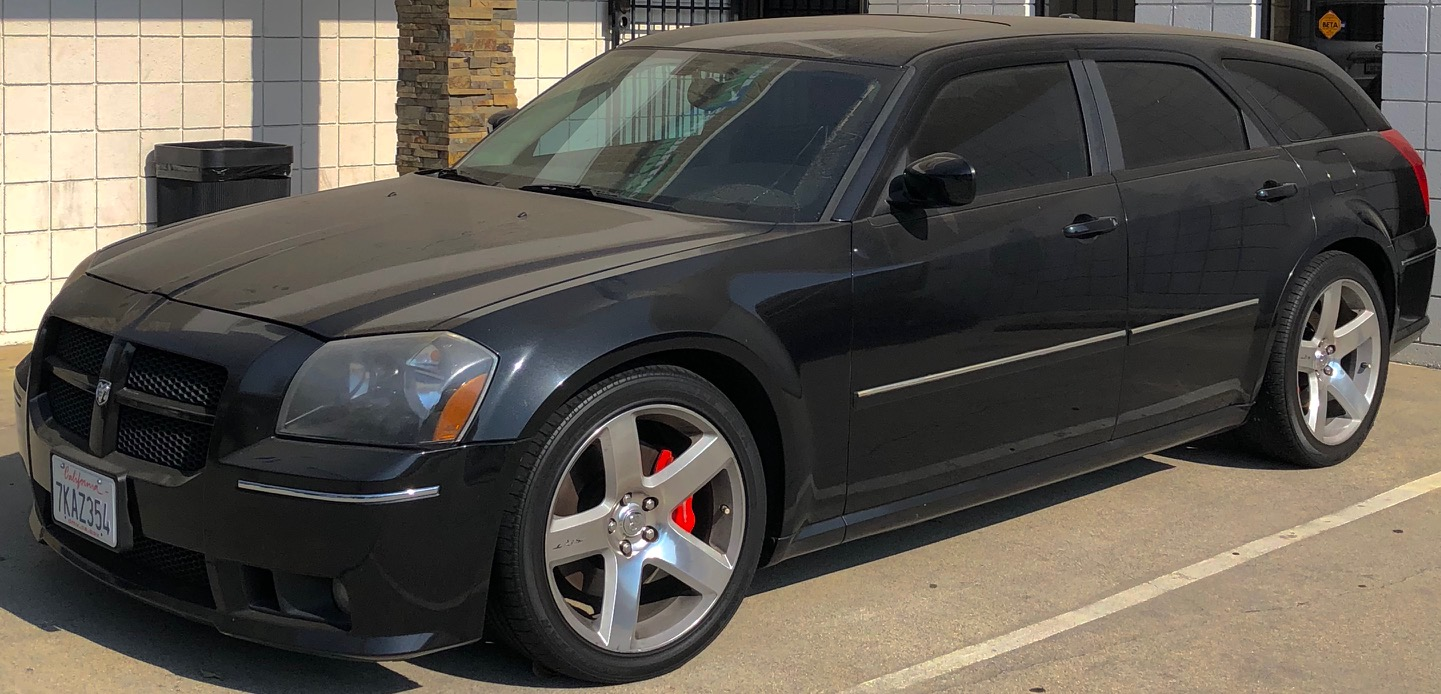
Dodge Magnum SRT8 (pre-facelift)

A higher performance SRT8 version debuted at the 2005 Los Angeles Auto Show. The SRT8 was based on a concept car that was displayed at the 2003 Los Angeles Auto Show. It went on sale in 2005 as a 2006 model. Like the 300C SRT8, it featured the new 6.1 L (370 cu in) Hemi engine, which produced 425 hp (317 kW). 20-inch wheels, firmer suspension, bigger Brembo brakes, new lower-body treatment, and a revised front and rear-fascia completed the transformation. The SRT8 was named "Best New Modern Muscle Car" in the 2006 Canadian Car of the Year contest.

Motor Trend test results:

- 0-60 mph (97 km/h): 5.1 seconds
- 0-100 mph (161 km/h): 11.7 seconds
- Standing 1/4-mile: 13.1 seconds at 108 mph (174 km/h)

2007 and 2008 also saw the addition of the R/T "Red Badge" 29R Road and Track package, which featured all of the SRT8 options except the 6.1 Hemi engine and Brembo brakes.

=== Safety ===
NHTSA crash test ratings (2006):

- Frontal Crash Test – Driver:
- Frontal Crash Test – Passenger:
- Side Impact Rating – Driver:
- Side Impact Rating – Rear Passenger:
- Rollover Rating: 10.9%

=== Europe and Australia ===
In Europe and Australia, the Magnum was sold as the Chrysler 300 Touring. It was essentially the same as the U.S.-market Magnum, but with the Chrysler 300C's front end and interior, and right-hand-drive for Australia and the U.K. The 300C Touring added an available 3.0 L CRD Turbo Diesel version. The 300C Touring was assembled in Austria.

=== 2008 changes ===
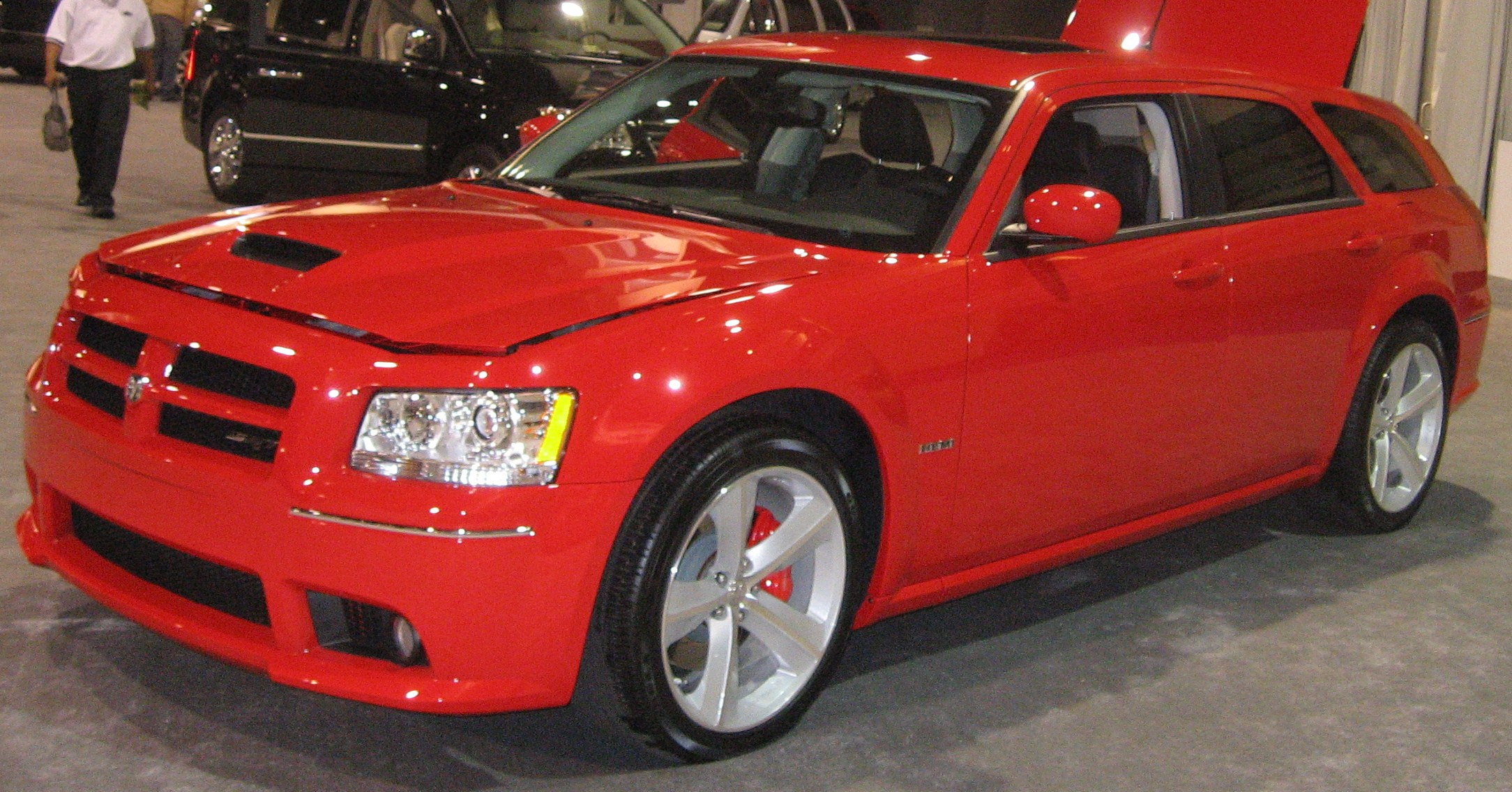
2008 Dodge Magnum SRT8 (facelift), in TorRed

For the 2008 model year, the Magnum received a facelift as well as an updated interior in line with that of the Dodge Charger. The front fascia sported new aggressively squared off headlights and a smaller rectangular grille more reminiscent of the Charger. The Magnum SE, SXT, And RT models received two all new colors for the 2008 model year; Mineral Gray, and Light Sandstone. The SRT8 variant gained a new hood scoop, more aggressive front fascia, a smaller, honeycomb mesh grille, and larger lower grille with brake cooling ducts. New colors such as TorRed and Steel Blue Metallic, originally introduced in 2007, were carried over to the face lifted 2008 SRT8 Magnums as well as other trim levels. These new changes brought the car closer to its Charger platform mate, away from the Chrysler 300.

However, with its cancellation that same model year, the 2008 facelift was only available for one year.

== Cancellation ==
On November 1, 2007, Chrysler announced that, as part of its restructuring plans, the Dodge Magnum would be one of four models discontinued after the 2008 model year. In Chrysler's words: "The Magnum, along with the PT Cruiser convertible, the Crossfire, and the Pacifica were not earning their keep". Production ended on September 28, 2008. The Dodge Magnum (along with the short-wheelbase Dodge Caravan) has been replaced by the Dodge Journey.

=== Total U.S. sales ===
| Calendar Year | Sales |
|---|---|
| 2004 | 39,217 |
| 2005 | 52,487 |
| 2006 | 40,095 |
| 2007 | 30,256 |
| 2008 | 6,912 |
| 2009 | 113 |

== Front end conversion ==
Because a variant of the Magnum was marketed as the Chrysler 300, the Dodge front end can be replaced by the front styling of the 2005-2010 Chrysler 300 with little to no custom fabrication. It's also possible to swap on the Charger's front fascia, but doing so is generally a more involved process. While the Magnum front fascia can be swapped with that of the Dodge Challenger, it is not a direct bolt-on swap, despite the cars sharing the same platform.
