= Chrysler LX platform =

Overview
- Manufacturer: DaimlerChrysler (2004–2007); Chrysler LLC (2007–2009); Chrysler Group LLC (2009–2014); Fiat S.p.A. (2012–2014); Fiat Chrysler Automobiles (2014–2021); Stellantis (2021–2024)
- Production: 2004–2024

Body and chassis
- Class: Mid-size (D); Executive car (E); Full-size luxury car (F)
- Layout: Front engine, rear-wheel drive / all-wheel drive
- Body styles: 4-door sedan/saloon; 2-door coupé; 5-door SUV

Chronology
- Predecessor: Chrysler LH platform
- Successor: STLA Large platform

The LX platform was Chrysler's full-size rear wheel drive automobile platform introduced in 2004 for the 2005 model year. The LX was developed in North America to supersede the previous Chrysler LH platform, which had been designed to allow it to be easily upgraded to rear and all-wheel drive. The LD Charger, 300 and LA Challenger cars are built at Brampton Assembly in Brampton, Ontario, Canada. The European variant and all RHD models were built in Graz, Austria, by Magna Steyr from June 2005 until 2010, where they carried the platform designation of LE. The Maserati vehicles which employed LX were produced at the Giovanni Agnelli plant in Grugliasco before later moving to the Stabilimento Mirafiori factory in Turin.

== Development ==
The LX platform was developed from the front wheel drive LH platform that preceded it, with the front suspension reportedly designed in-house, and the five-link rear suspension design taken from the Mercedes-Benz E-Class (W211) with a couple of changes. LX platform cars also used a rear differential and W5A580 five-speed automatic transmission derived from the Mercedes 722.6 (which was actually a modified ZF 5HP30). All-wheel drive models used a version of the Magna Steyr all-wheel drive system used in the E-Class.

== LX ==
Vehicles using the LX platform include:

- 2005–2010 Chrysler 300 sedan, station wagon (LE Only)
- 2005–2008 Dodge Magnum station wagon
- 2006–2010 Dodge Charger sedan

Concept vehicles using this platform include:

- Chrysler Nassau sedan
- Chrysler Airflite sedan

== LC ==
The LC platform is a shortened LX platform designed for the Challenger.

Vehicles using the LC/LA platform include:

- 2008–2014, LC
- 2015–2023, LA

Dodge Challenger coupe

Concept vehicles using this platform include:

- Chrysler 200C EV sedan

== LD ==
The LD platform was introduced in 2011 for the seventh generation of the Charger. It is an entirely redesigned and updated platform that replaced the original LX.

Vehicles using the LD platform include:

- 2011–2023 Dodge Charger
- 2011–2023 Chrysler 300
- 2012–2015 Lancia Thema sedan

== LA ==
The LA platform code has been used for the updated Dodge Challenger beginning in the 2015 model year. It was created primarily to allow the Challenger to use an eight speed automatic transmission.

- 2015–2023 Dodge Challenger coupe

== LY ==
The LY platform is a lengthened LX platform used for:

- 2006 Chrysler Imperial sedan concept car

== M156 ==
This employment of LX/LY is a rear wheel drive automobile platform developed by Maserati for use in a range of vehicles in the Fiat group. It underpins the 2013 Maserati Quattroporte, as well as the 2013 Maserati Ghibli and 2016 Maserati Levante (in the latter two's shortened version, named "M157"). It uses four-wheel independent suspension, composed of double wishbones at the front and a multilink setup at the rear, and supports all wheel drive.

- 2012-2023 Maserati Quattroporte
- 2013-2023 Maserati Ghibli
- 2016-2024 Maserati Levante

== Future LB Platform ==
In June 2018, former FCA CEO, Sergio Marchionne stated that Dodge Challenger and Charger will retain the current LD platform which will be heavily revised for the next generation. Many thoughts suggesting the current LD Platform cars would hit the Giorgio platform, however this was later debunked by Marchionne stating that the Giorgio is more suited towards sports oriented European vehicles instead of American muscle cars.

Upon the merger of Group PSA with FCA, an evolution of Giorgio Architecture was developed while executing platform consolidation now named the STLA large. This Architecture already under the WLs and will eventually support KM, EJ, C6X, RU and RV along with all large segment cars for Europe, Maserati and Alfa. The Architecture will support multifuel BEV, PHEV, and ICE. The replacement in North America will be the LB29 for 2 Door Chargers, and LB49 4 Door Charger.
