= Chrysler (brand) =

Automotive brand owned by Stellantis

- Product type: Automobile
- Current owner: Stellantis North America
- Introduced: June 6, 1925; 101 years ago
- Related brands: Mopar, Dodge, Plymouth
- Markets: Worldwide
- Previous owners: DaimlerChrysler (1998–2007); FCA (2014–2021)
- Ambassador: Matt McAlear (Chrysler brand CEO)
- Website: chrysler.com

Chrysler is an American brand of automobiles and a division owned by Stellantis North America. The automaker was founded in 1925 by Walter Chrysler from the remains of the Maxwell Motor Company. The brand primarily focused on building luxury vehicles as the broader Chrysler Corporation expanded, following a strategy of brand diversification and hierarchy largely adopted from General Motors.

The brand has been historically popular. However starting in the late 2010s, the brand has been overshadowed by other brands owned by Stellantis. As of model year 2026, the company's production vehicle lineup solely consists of the Pacifica minivan, although there are currently plans by Stellantis to revive the brand, as seen with the Chrysler Airflow concept, due to its heritage and continued popularity.

== History ==
=== Early history ===
The first Chrysler cars were introduced on January 5, 1924, at the New York Automobile Show – one year before Chrysler Corporation itself was created. These cars, launched by Maxwell Motors, had a new high-compression six-cylinder, a seven-bearing crankshaft, carburetor air cleaner, replaceable oil filter, and four-wheel hydraulic brakes. Features like this had never been offered in a medium-priced car before, and the 32,000 first-year record sales proved the popularity of this model.

In 1926, Chrysler introduced the Chrysler 70, named for its ability to hit 70 mph. In 1927, Chrysler had four models: the Chrysler 50, 60, 70, and Imperial 80. Chrysler was in fourth place in sales, with 192,082 units delivered. In 1928, Chrysler invested $23 million to expand its plants.

=== 1930s ===
In 1930, Chrysler began wiring the Chrysler Model 70 and 77 for radios. Chrysler also became the first car to offer the downdraft carburetor on its models. With the new carburetor, Chrysler also received a new cam-driven fuel pump. For the 1931 model, Chrysler received new radiator grilles, a new Chrysler Spitfire engine, and automatic spark control. The 1932 Chryslers introduced the Floating Power rubber engine mounts, which eliminated further vibrations from the chassis. A vacuum-controlled automatic clutch, Oilite bearings, and the first universal joints with roller bearings were also added. In 1933, Chrysler models received a host of new improvements, including a new three-speed manual transmission that used helical gears – for silent use. Chrysler engines received new alloy valve seats for better reliability, along with new spring shackles, which improved lubrication.

In 1934, the Chrysler 6 introduced an independent front coil spring suspension and received vent windows that rolled down with the side glass. Chrysler also introduced its revolutionary Chrysler Airflow, which included a welded Unibody, a wind-tunnel-designed aerodynamic body for a better power-to-power ratio and better handling. In 1935, Chrysler introduced the Plymouth-based Chrysler Airstream Six, which gave customers an economical modern alternative to the radically styled Airflows. The Airflow received an updated front hood and grille in 1935. For 1936, the Chrysler Airflow received an enlarged luggage compartment, a new roof, and a new adjustable front seat. The Airstream Six and Eight of the previous year were renamed the Chrysler Six and Deluxe Eight. The Automatic overdrive was optional for both cars.

For 1937, the Airflow cars were mostly discontinued, besides the C-17 Airflow, which received a final facelift. Only 4600 C-17 Airflows were built in 1937. The Chrysler Six and Chrysler Eight were respectively renamed the Royal and Imperial and gained isolated rubber body mounts to remove road vibrations. In 1938, the Chrysler Royal received the new 95 HP Gold Seal Inline 6. In 1939, Chrysler unveiled Superfinish a process in which all major chassis components subject to wear were finished to a mirror-like surface. Other features new to Chrysler were push-button door locks, and rotary-type door latches.

=== 1940s ===
In 1940, Chrysler introduced sealed beam headlights on its cars, which in turn improved night visibility by 50%. Mid-year, in 1940, Chrysler introduced the Highlander as a special edition featuring popular features and a Scottish plaid interior. The luxury sport model, called the Saratoga, was also added to the New Yorker range as the Imperial became the exclusive limousine model. In 1941, Chrysler introduced the Fluid Drive semi-automatic transmission. 1942 Chryslers were redesigned with a wrap-a-round chrome grille and concealed running boards for this abbreviated model year; civilian production stopped by February 1942. In 1946, Chrysler redesigned the 1942 cars and reintroduced the Town & Country. In 1949, Chrysler came out with the first all-new redesign in almost a decade. In 1949, Chrysler moved the ignition to key only instead of having a key and push-button. They also reintroduced the nine-passenger station wagon body style to the line.

=== 1950s ===
For 1950, Chrysler updated the overly conservative 1949 models by lowering cars slightly, updating the grille to appear more simple, replacing the chrome fin tail lamps with flush units, and removing the third brake light from the trunk lid. Also in 1950, Chrysler introduced disc brakes on the Imperial, the new Chrysler Newport hardtop, power windows, and the padded safety dash. Chrysler introduced their first overhead-valve, high-compression V8 engine in 1951; displacing 331 cubic inches, it was rated at 180 bhp, 20 more horsepower than the new-for-1949 Cadillac V8. It was unique as the only American V8 engine designed with hemispherical combustion chambers. After successfully winning Mexican Road Races, the engine was upgraded to 250 bhp by 1955.

Although Chrysler did not build a small sporty car (such as the Chevrolet Corvette and the Ford Thunderbird), they decided to build a unique sporting car based on the New Yorker hardtop coupe that featured a 300-bhp "Hemi" V8. To add to the car's uniqueness, the car was given a grille from the Imperial and side trim from the less-adorned Windsor. A PowerFlite 2-speed automatic transmission was the only available gearbox. It was marketed as the Chrysler 300, emphasizing the engine's horsepower, continuing a luxury sport approach introduced earlier with the Chrysler Saratoga.

In 1955, the flagship Imperial was spun off into its own line of luxury cars, slotted above Chrysler, Imperial would remain a separate brand through 1975, and would be reintroduced in 1980, offering a single model through 1983. The Imperial returned as the flagship Chrysler for model years 1990-1993.

A 1955 restyle by newly hired Virgil Exner saw a dramatic rise in Chrysler sales, which rose even more in 1957 when the entire line was dramatically restyled a second time with a sloping front end and high-flying tailfins at the rear. Although well received at first, it soon became apparent that quality control was compromised to get the new cars to market on an accelerated schedule. In 1957, all Chrysler products were installed with Torsion-Aire front suspension, which was a Torsion bar suspension only for the front wheels that followed two years after Packard installed Torsion-Level suspension on both the front and rear wheels.

Sales of all Chrysler models plummeted in 1958 and 1959 despite improvements in quality. Throughout the mid-and late-1950s, Chryslers were available in top-line New Yorker, mid-line Saratoga, and base Windsor series. Exner's designs for the Chrysler brand in the early 1960s were overblown versions of the late 1950s, which were unhelpful in sales. Exner left his post by 1962, leaving Elwood Engel, a recent transfer from Ford Motor Co, in charge of Chrysler styling.

=== 1960s ===
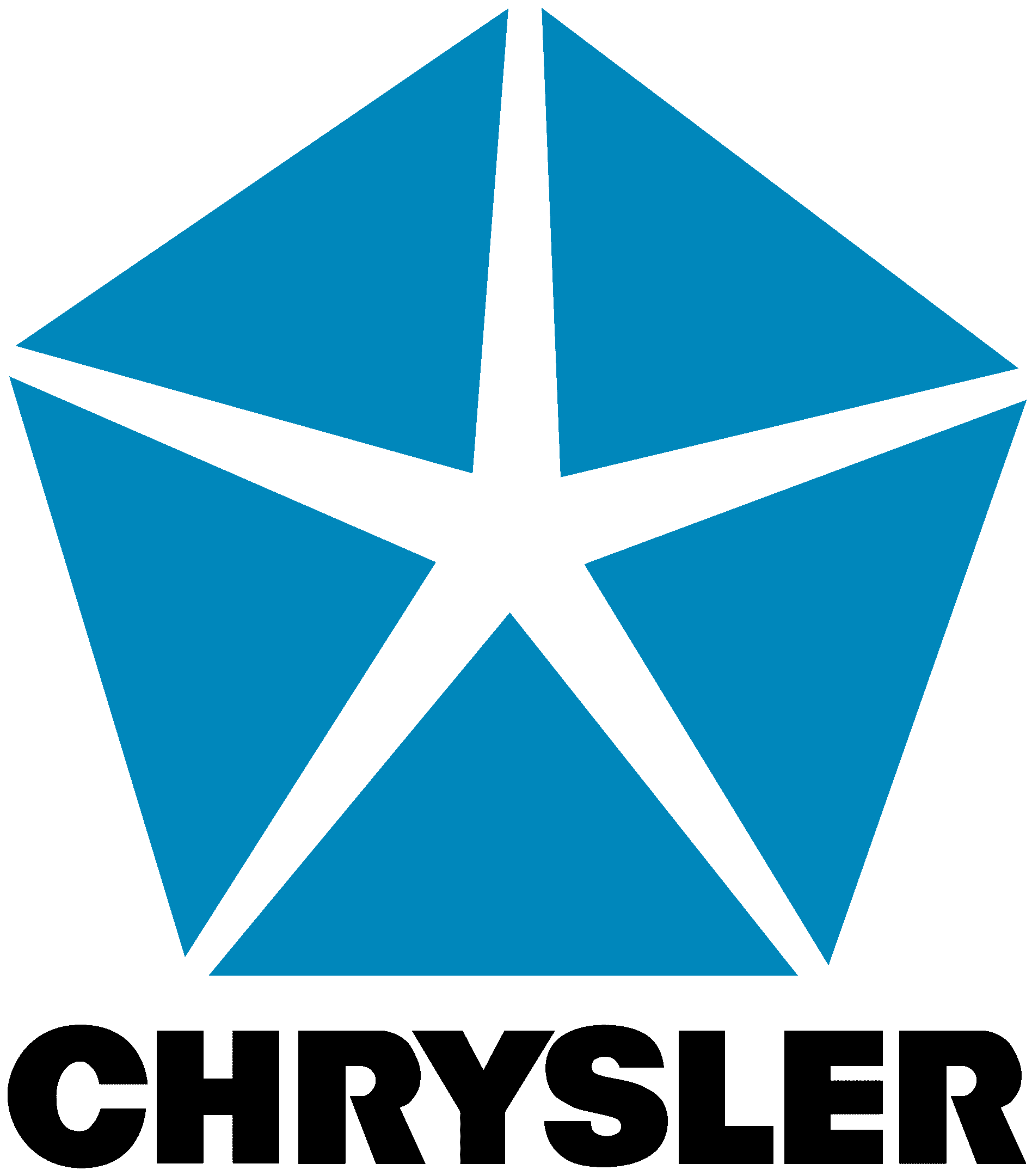
The Pentastar logo was introduced in 1962

Although early 1960s Chrysler cars reflected Virgil Exner's exaggerated styling, Elwood Engel's influence was evident as early as 1963, when a restyled, trimmer, boxier Chrysler was introduced. The Desoto lines, along with the Windsor and Saratoga series, were replaced with the Newport, while New Yorker continued as the luxury model, while Imperial continued to be the top-of-the-line brand. The Chrysler 300, officially part of the New Yorker product line, continued in production as a high-performance coupe through 1965, adding a different letter of the alphabet for each year of production, starting with the 300-B of 1956, through the 300-L of 1965.

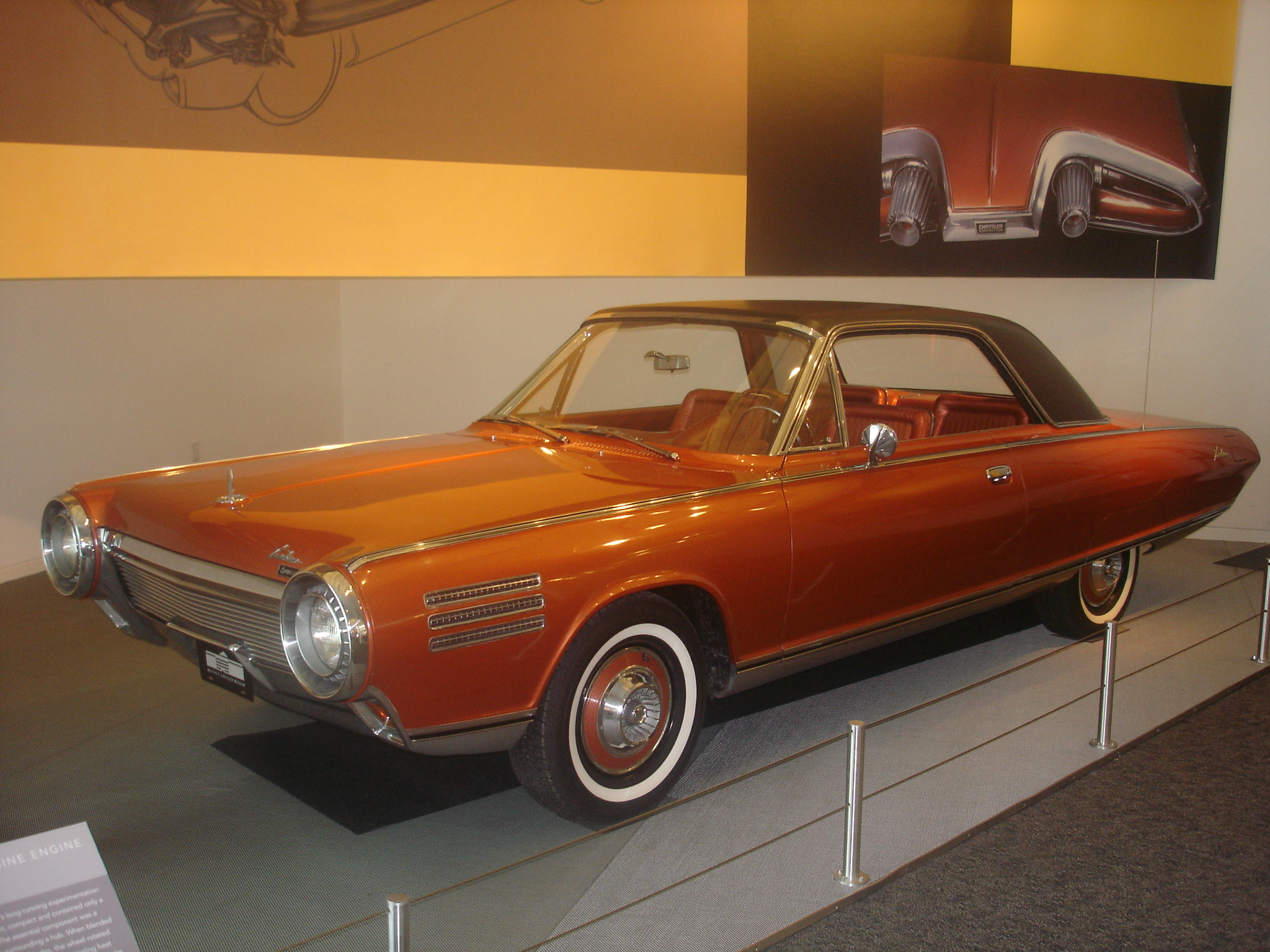
Chrysler Turbine Car was introduced in 1963

1962 saw a "non-letter" 300, which was lower in price but was equipped with downgraded standard equipment. The 1965 Chryslers were again dramatically restyled, with a thoroughly modern unit body and larger engines up to 413 cubic inches. They were squared off and slab-sided, with optional glass-covered headlamps that retracted when the headlights were turned on and a swept-back roofline for 2-door hardtop models. Chryslers through the 1960s were well-built, quality cars with innovative features such as unit bodies and front torsion bar suspension

In 1963, Bob Hope was a spokesperson of The Chrysler Theatre, an anthology series sponsored by the brand. The same year the Chrysler Turbine Car was introduced. It was an experimental two-door hardtop coupe powered by a turbine engine and manufactured from 1963 to 1964. Italian design studio Carrozzeria Ghia constructed the bodywork, and Chrysler completed the final assembly in Detroit. A total of 55 Turbine Cars were manufactured.

=== 1970s ===
The Cordoba was introduced by Chrysler for the 1975 model year as an upscale personal luxury car that replaced the 300, competing with the Oldsmobile Cutlass, Buick Regal, and Mercury Cougar. The Cordoba was originally intended to be a Plymouth—the names Mirada, Premier, Sebring, and Grand Era were associated with the project; all except Grand Era would be used on later Chrysler, Dodge, and Eagle vehicles, though only the Dodge Mirada would be related to the Cordoba. However, losses from the newly introduced full-size C-body models due to the 1973 oil crisis, along with the investment in the Turbine Car that did not produce a product to sell, encouraged Chrysler executives to seek higher profits by marketing the model under the more upscale Chrysler brand.

The car was a success, with over 150,000 examples sold in 1975, a sales year that was otherwise dismal for the company. For the 1976 model year, sales increased slightly to 165,000. The mildly revised 1977 version also sold well, with just under 140,000 cars. The success of using the Chrysler nameplate strategy is contrasted to sales of its similar and somewhat cheaper corporate cousin, the Dodge Charger SE.

Interiors were more luxurious than the Dodge Charger SE and much more than the top-line standard intermediates (Plymouth Fury, Dodge Coronet) with a velour cloth notchback bench seat and folding armrest standard. Optionally available were bucket seats upholstered in Corinthian leather with a center armrest and cushion or, at extra cost, a center console with floor shifter and storage compartment.

In 1977, Chrysler brought out a new mid-size line of cars called LeBaron (a name previously used for an Imperial model), which included a coupe, sedan, and station wagon.

=== 1980s ===
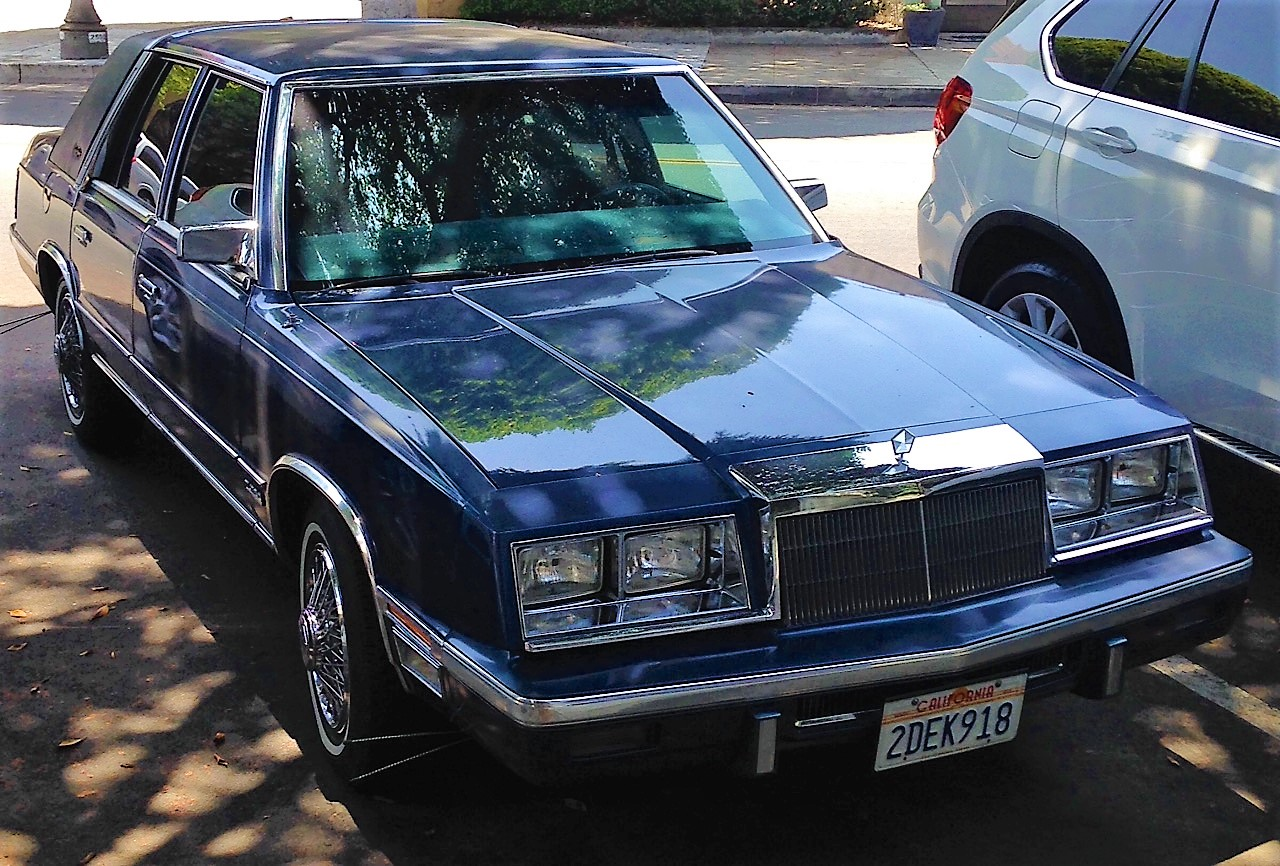
1987 Chrysler New Yorker

In 1982, the LeBaron moved to the front-wheel drive Chrysler K platform, where it was the upscale brand's lowest-priced offering. It was initially available in just sedan and coupe versions. In early 1982, it was released in a convertible version, bringing to the market the first factory-built open-topped domestic vehicle since the 1976 Cadillac Eldorado. A station wagon version called the Town and Country was added as well. A special Town and Country convertible was also made from 1983 until 1986 in limited quantities (1,105 total), which, like the wagon, featured simulated wood paneling that made it resemble the original 1940s Town and Country. This model was part of the well-equipped Mark Cross option package for the latter years.

In 1982, the R-body line was discontinued, and the New Yorker nameplate transferred to the smaller M-body line. Up to this point, the Chrysler M-body entry had been sold as LeBaron, but that name was moved to a new K-car-based FWD line (refer to the Chrysler LeBaron article for information on the 1977–81 M-bodies). Following the nameplate swap, the M-body line was consolidated and simplified. 360 V8 engines were gone, as were coupes and station wagons (the K-car LeBaron's coupe and wagon replaced them). The Fifth Avenue option was still available as a $1,244 option package. It was adapted from the earlier LeBaron's package, with a distinctive vinyl roof, electroluminescent opera lamps, and a rear fascia adapted from the Dodge Diplomat. Interiors featured button-tufted, pillow-soft seats covered in either "Kimberley velvet" or "Corinthian leather," choices that would continue unchanged throughout the car's run. In addition, the carpet was thicker than that offered in the base New Yorker, Diplomat and Gran Fury/Caravelle Salon, and the interior had more chrome trim.

The last year for Chrysler's Cordoba coupe was 1983. That year, Chrysler introduced a new front-wheel-drive New Yorker model based on a stretched K-Car platform. Additionally, a less expensive, less equipped version of the new New Yorker was sold as the Chrysler E-Class in 1983 and 1984. More upscale stretched K-Car models were also sold as Chrysler Executive sedans and limousines.

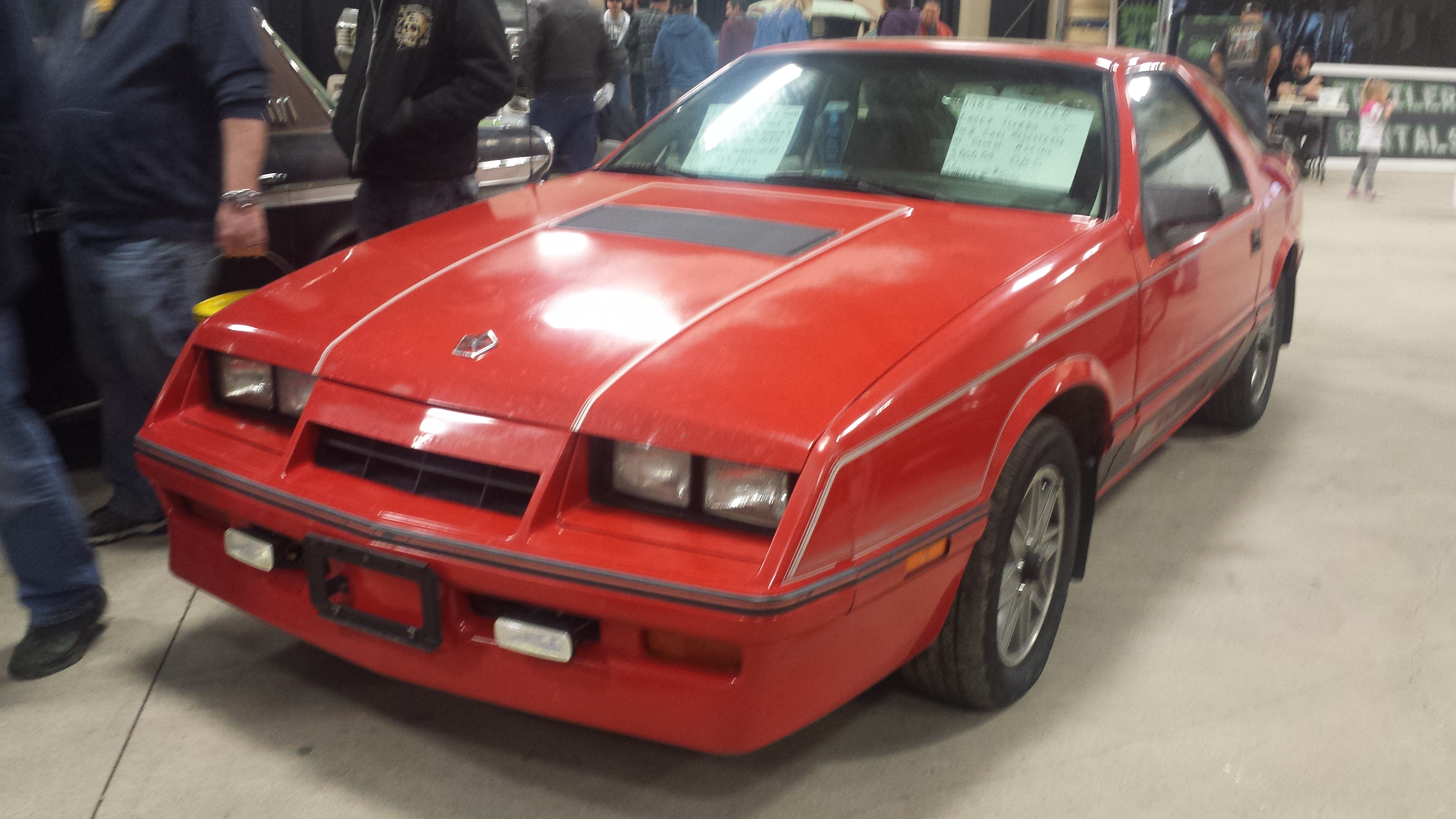
1985 Chrysler Laser Turbo XT

With the 1984 model year, the New Yorker Fifth Avenue was now simply called Fifth Avenue, setting the name that would continue for six successful years. All Fifth Avenues from 1984 until 1989 were powered by a 318 cu in (5.2 L) V8 engine, with either a two-barrel carburetor making 140 hp (104 kW) (in all states except California) or a four-barrel rated at 170 hp (127 kW) (in California), mated to Chrysler's well-known Torqueflite three-speed automatic transmission. Fifth Avenue production was moved from Windsor, Ontario to St. Louis, Missouri. Beginning in late 1986 through the 1989 model year, they were manufactured at the American Motors plant in Kenosha, Wisconsin (purchased by Chrysler in 1987). The Fifth Avenue also far outsold its Dodge Diplomat and Plymouth Gran Fury siblings, with a much greater proportion of sales going to private customers despite its higher price tag. Production peaked at 118,000 cars for 1986, and the Fifth Avenue stood out in a by-now K-car-dominated lineup as Chrysler's lone concession to traditional RWD American sedans.

Chrysler introduced a new mid-size four-door hatchback model in 1985 under the LeBaron GTS nameplate. It was sold alongside the mid-size LeBaron sedan, coupe, convertible, and station wagon. The LeBaron coupe and convertible were redesigned in 1987. Unlike previous LeBarons, this new coupe and convertible had unique styling instead of being just two-door versions of the sedan. The new design featured hidden headlamps (through 1992) and full-width taillights.

The New Yorker was redesigned for the 1988 model year and now included a standard V6 engine. This generation of New Yorker also saw the return of hidden headlamps, which had not been available on the New Yorker since the 1981 R-body version. In 1989, Chrysler brought out the TC by Maserati luxury roadster as a more affordable alternative to Cadillac's Allante. It was a joint venture model between Chrysler and Maserati.

=== 1990s ===
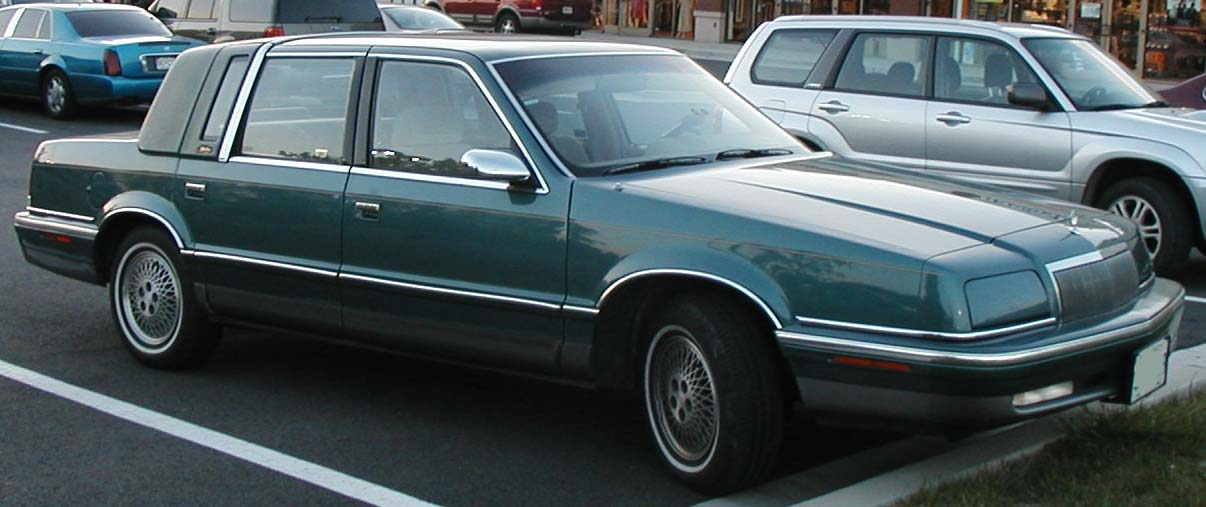
1992–1993 Chrysler New Yorker Fifth Avenue

Chrysler re-introduced the Town & Country nameplate in the calendar year 1989 as a luxury rebadged variant of the Dodge Grand Caravan/Plymouth Grand Voyager minivan for the 1990 model year and continued to sell this incarnation of the Chrysler Town & Country until the end of the 2016 model year when Chrysler reintroduced the Pacifica nameplate for their minivan in the calendar year 2016 for the 2017 model year run.

1990 saw the previous relationship between New Yorker and Fifth Avenue return, as Fifth Avenue became a model of the New Yorker. There was some substantive difference, however, as the New Yorker Fifth Avenue used a slightly longer chassis than the standard car. The new New Yorker Fifth Avenue's larger interior volume classified it as a full-size model this time despite having smaller exterior dimensions than the first generation. For 1990, Chrysler's new 3.3L V6 engine was the standard and only choice, teamed with the company's A-604 four-speed electronic automatic transaxle. Beginning in 1991, a larger 3.8L V6 became optional. It delivered the same 147 horsepower as the 3.3 but had more torque.

The New Yorker Fifth Avenue's famous seats, long noted for their button-tufted appearance and sofa-like comfort, continued to be offered with the customer's choice of velour or leather, with the former "Corinthian leather" replaced by that of the Mark Cross company. Leather-equipped cars bore the Mark Cross logo on the seats and, externally, on an emblem attached to the brushed aluminum band ahead of the rear door opera windows. In this form, the New Yorker Fifth Avenue resembled the newly revived Chrysler Imperial, although some much-needed distinction was provided between the cars when the New Yorker Fifth Avenue (along with its New Yorker Salon linemate) received restyled, rounded-off front and rear ends for the 1992 model year, while the Imperial continued in its original crisply-lined form.

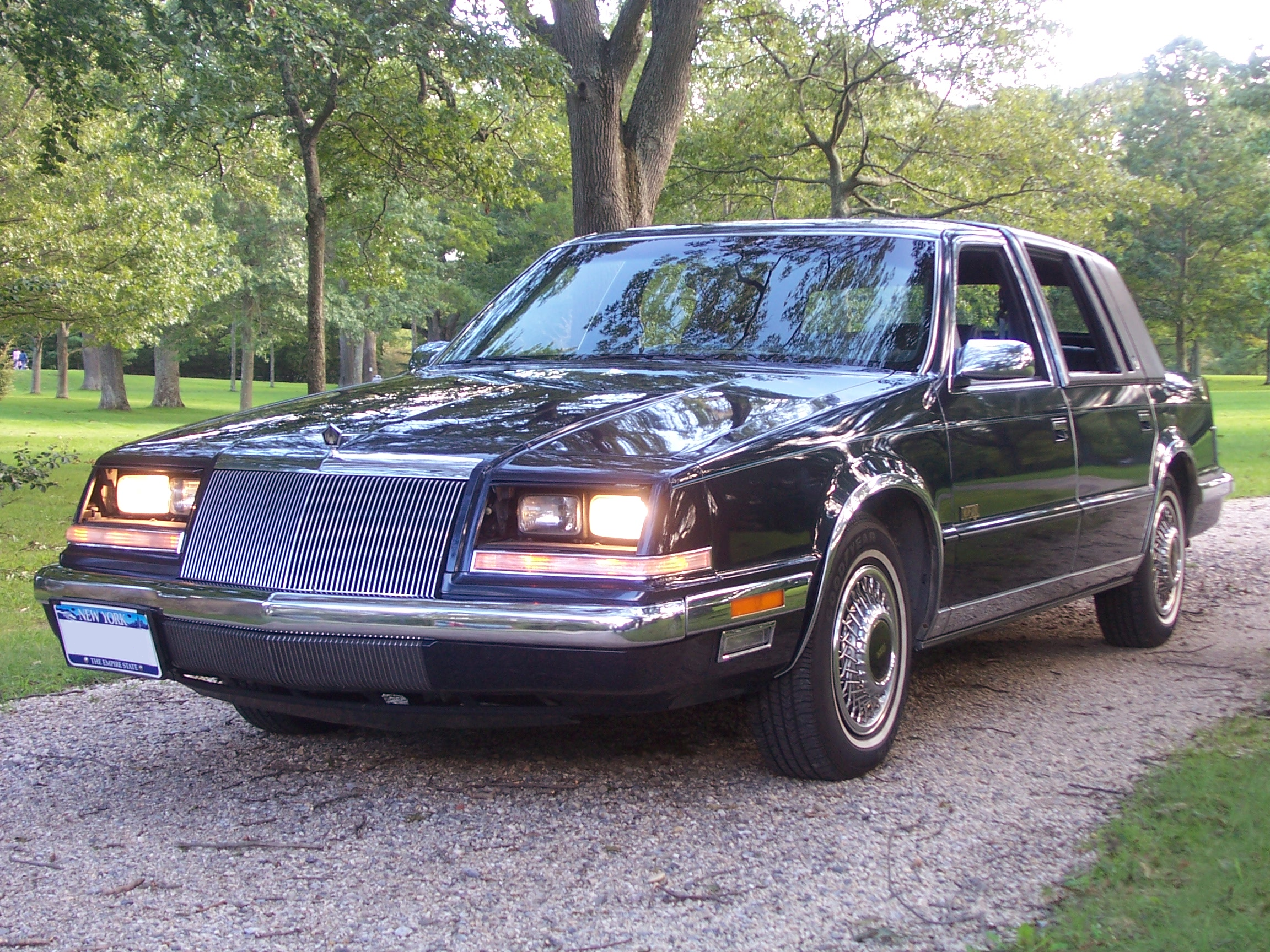
1992 Chrysler Imperial

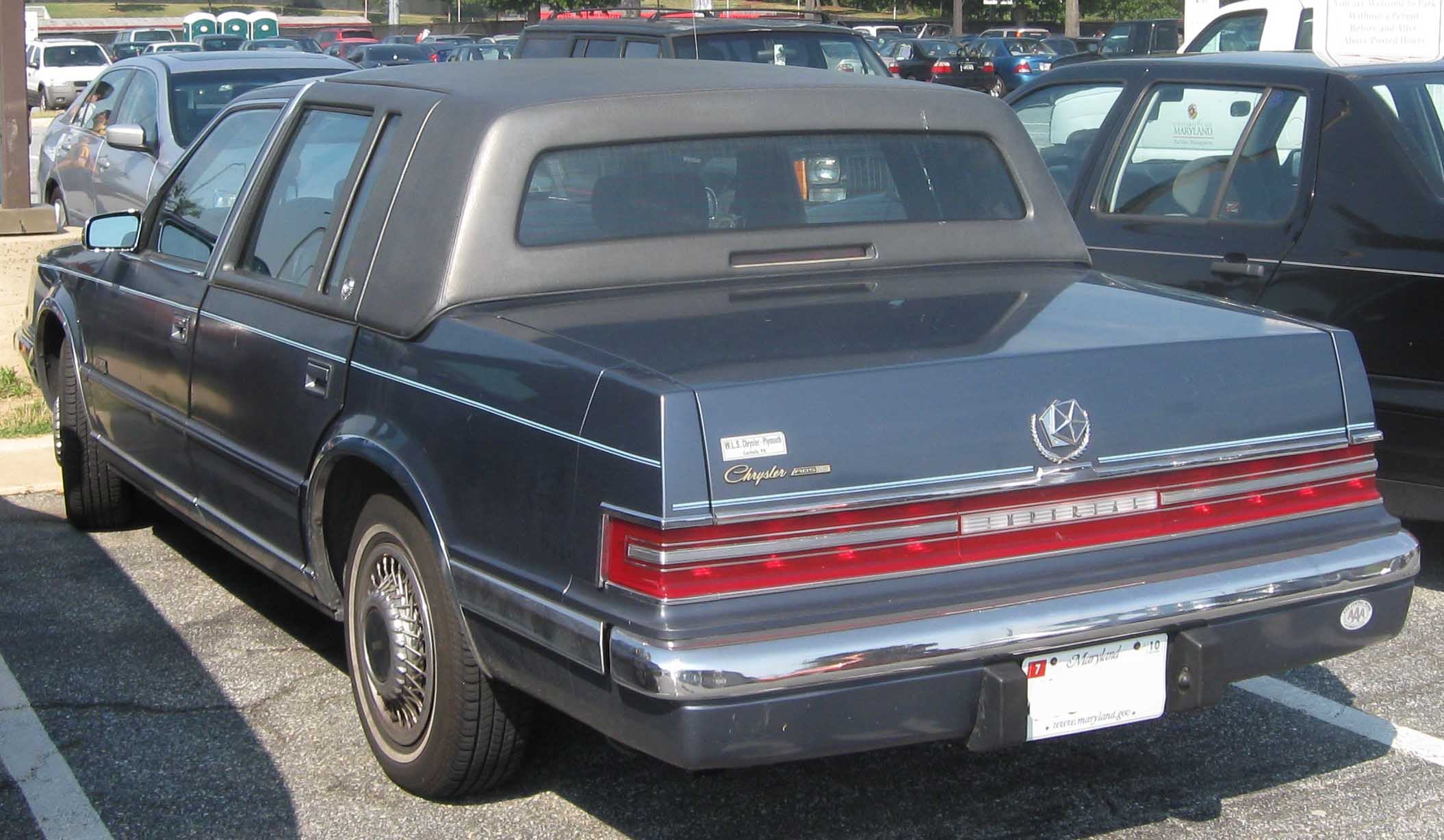
The 1990s Chrysler Imperial featured full-width taillights.

The early 1990s saw a revival of the Imperial as a high-end sedan in Chrysler's lineup. Unlike the 1955 through 1983 Imperial, this car was a model of Chrysler, not its own marque. Based on the Y platform, it represented the top full-size model in Chrysler's lineup; below it was the similar New Yorker Fifth Avenue, and below that was the shorter wheelbase New Yorker. The reintroduction of the Imperial was two years after the Lincoln Continental was changed to a front-wheel-drive sedan with a V6 engine.

Other domestic competitors in this segment included the Cadillac Sedan de Ville/Fleetwood, Oldsmobile 98, and Buick Electra/Park Avenue. Though closely related, the Imperial differed from the New Yorker Fifth Avenue in many ways. The Imperial's nose was more wedge-shaped, while the New Yorker Fifth Avenue's had a sharper, more angular profile (the New Yorker Fifth Avenue was later restyled with a more rounded front end). The rears of the two cars also differed. Like the front, the New Yorker Fifth Avenue's rear came to stiffer angles, while the Imperial's rear end came to more rounded edges. Also found on the Imperial were full-width taillights, which were similar to those of the Chrysler TC, as well as the early 1980s Imperial coupe, while the New Yorker Fifth Avenue came with smaller vertical taillights.

Initially, the 1990 Imperial was powered by the 147 hp (110 kW) 3.3L EGA V6 engine, which was rated at 185 lb⋅ft (251 N⋅m) of torque. For 1991, the 3.3L V6 was replaced by the larger 3.8L EGH V6. Although horsepower only increased to 150 hp (112 kW), with the new larger 3.8L V6 torque increased to 215 lb⋅ft (292 N⋅m) at 2750 rpm. A four-speed automatic transmission was standard with both engines.

Also new for 1990 was a redesigned LeBaron sedan, which offered a standard V6 engine. Later models would also be available with 4-cylinder engines.

The Town & Country minivan was restyled for 1991 in conjunction with the restyling of the Dodge and Plymouth minivan models. 1991 would also be the last year for the TC by Maserati, leaving the LeBaron as the brand's sole coupe and convertible options.

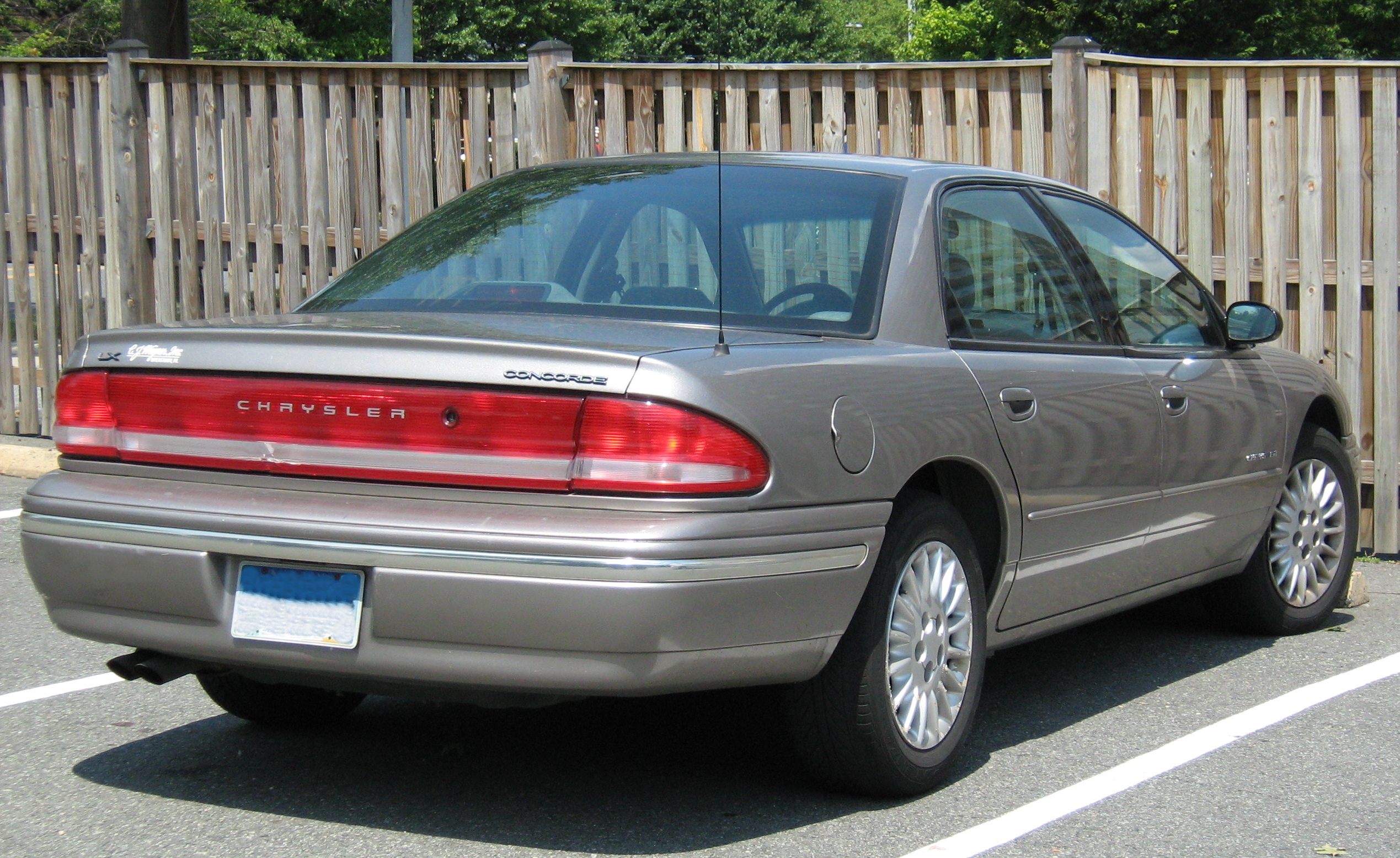
First generation featured full-width taillamp design.

The first generation of the Chrysler Concorde debuted at the 1992 North American International Auto Show in Detroit as a 1993 model. It debuted as a single, well-equipped model with a base price of US$18,341. Out of all the LH sedans, the first generation Concorde was most closely related to the Eagle Vision. The Concorde was given a more traditional image than the Vision. The two shared nearly all sheet metal in common, with the main differences limited to their grilles, rear fascias, bodyside moldings, and wheel choices.

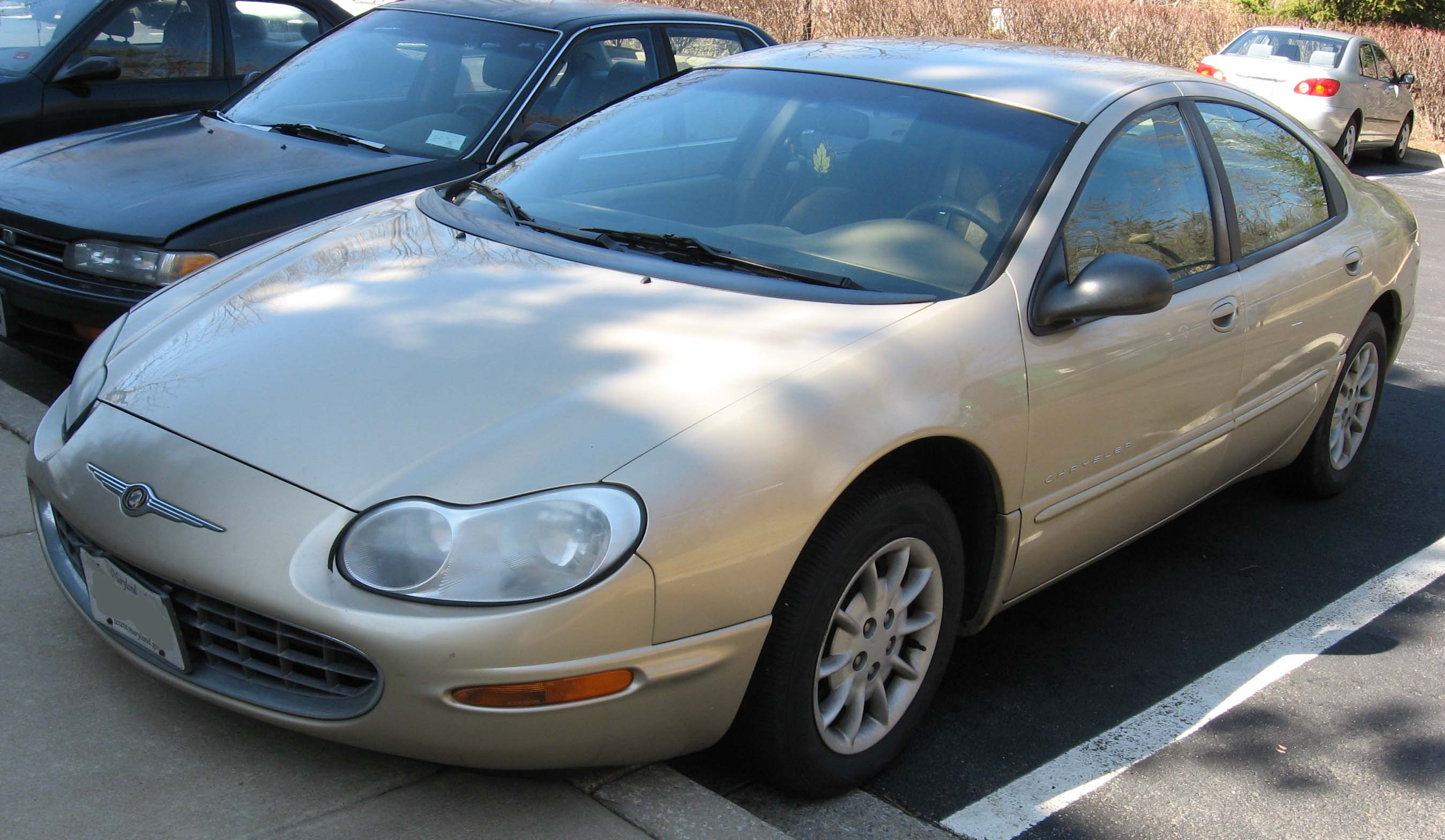
Chrysler Concorde

The Concorde featured a modern take on Chrysler's signature waterfall grille. It was split into six sections divided by body-colored strips with the Chrysler Pentastar logo on the center strip. The Concorde's rear fascia was highlighted by a full-width and full-height lightbar between the taillights, giving the appearance that the taillights stretched across the entire trunk. In keeping with its upscale position, Concorde's body side moldings incorporated bright chrome (later golden-colored) work not found on its Dodge or Eagle siblings. On Concordes with gray lower body paint color, the gray came up to the chrome beltline; on Visions, the gray lower body paint area was smaller and much more subtle. Wheel styles, which included available aluminum wheels with a Spiralcast design, were also unique to the Chrysler LH sedans (Concorde, LHS, New Yorker); Dodge and Eagle had different wheel styles.

Introduced in May 1993 for the 1994 model year, the Chrysler LHS was the top-of-the-line model for the division, as well as the most expensive of the Chrysler LH platform cars. All the LH-series models shared a 113.0-inch (2,870 mm) wheelbase and were developed using Chrysler's new computer drafting system. The car was differentiated from the division's New Yorker sedan by its bucket leather seats (the New Yorker had a bench seat) and standard features such as alloy wheels that were options on the New Yorker. Further differences between the Chrysler LHS and its New Yorker counterpart were a floor console and shifter, five-passenger seating, lack of chrome trim, an upgraded interior, and a sportier image. The New Yorker was dropped after the 1996 model year in favor of a six-passenger option on the LHS. The LHS received a minor face change in 1995 when the corporate-wide Pentastar emblem was replaced with the revived Chrysler brand emblem. Standard features of the LHS included a 3.5L EGE 24-valve 214 hp (160 kW; 217 PS) V6 engine, body-colored grille, side mirrors and trim, traction control, aluminum wheels, integrated fog lights, 8-way power-adjustable front seats, premium sound systems with amplifiers, and automatic temperature control. Unlike the New Yorker, leather seats were standard.

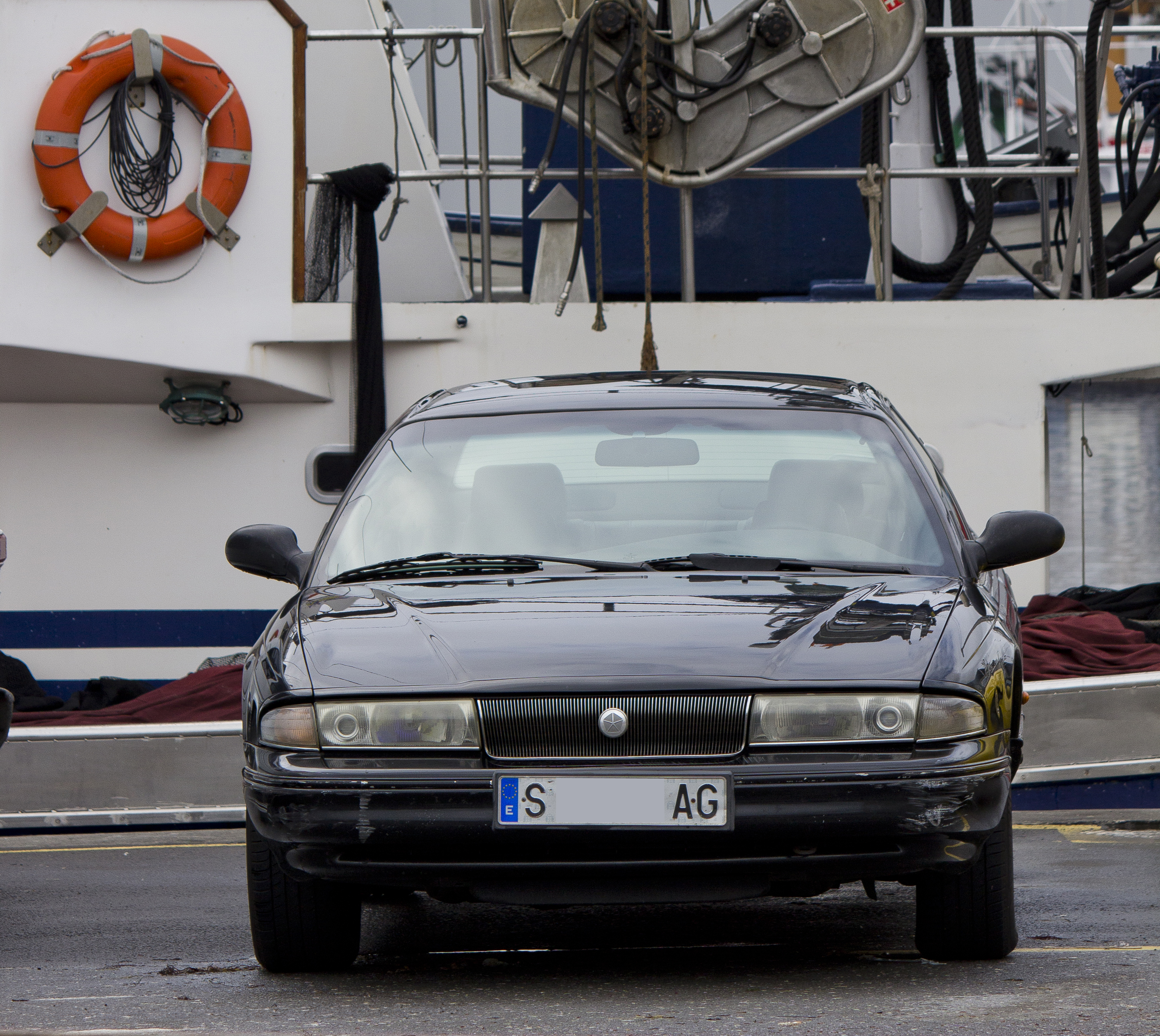
1994–1996 Chrysler New Yorker

The final generation of the New Yorker continued with front-wheel drive on an elongated version of the new Chrysler LH platform and was released in May 1993 along with the nearly identical Chrysler LHS as an early 1994 model, eight months after the original LH cars: the Chrysler Concorde, Dodge Intrepid, and Eagle Vision, were introduced. The New Yorker came standard with the 3.5L EGE which produced 214 hp (160 kW). Chrysler gave the New Yorker a more "traditional American" luxury image and the LHS a more European performance image (as was done with the Eagle Vision). Little separated New Yorker from LHS in appearance, with New Yorker's chrome hood trim, body-color cladding, standard chrome wheel covers, 15-inch wheels, column shifter, and front bench seat being the only noticeable differences. An option is provided for 16-inch wheels and a firmer suspension type ("touring suspension"). This option eliminated the technical differences between New Yorker and LHS. LHS came with almost all of New Yorker's optional features as standard equipment and featured the firmer tuned suspension to go with its more European image.

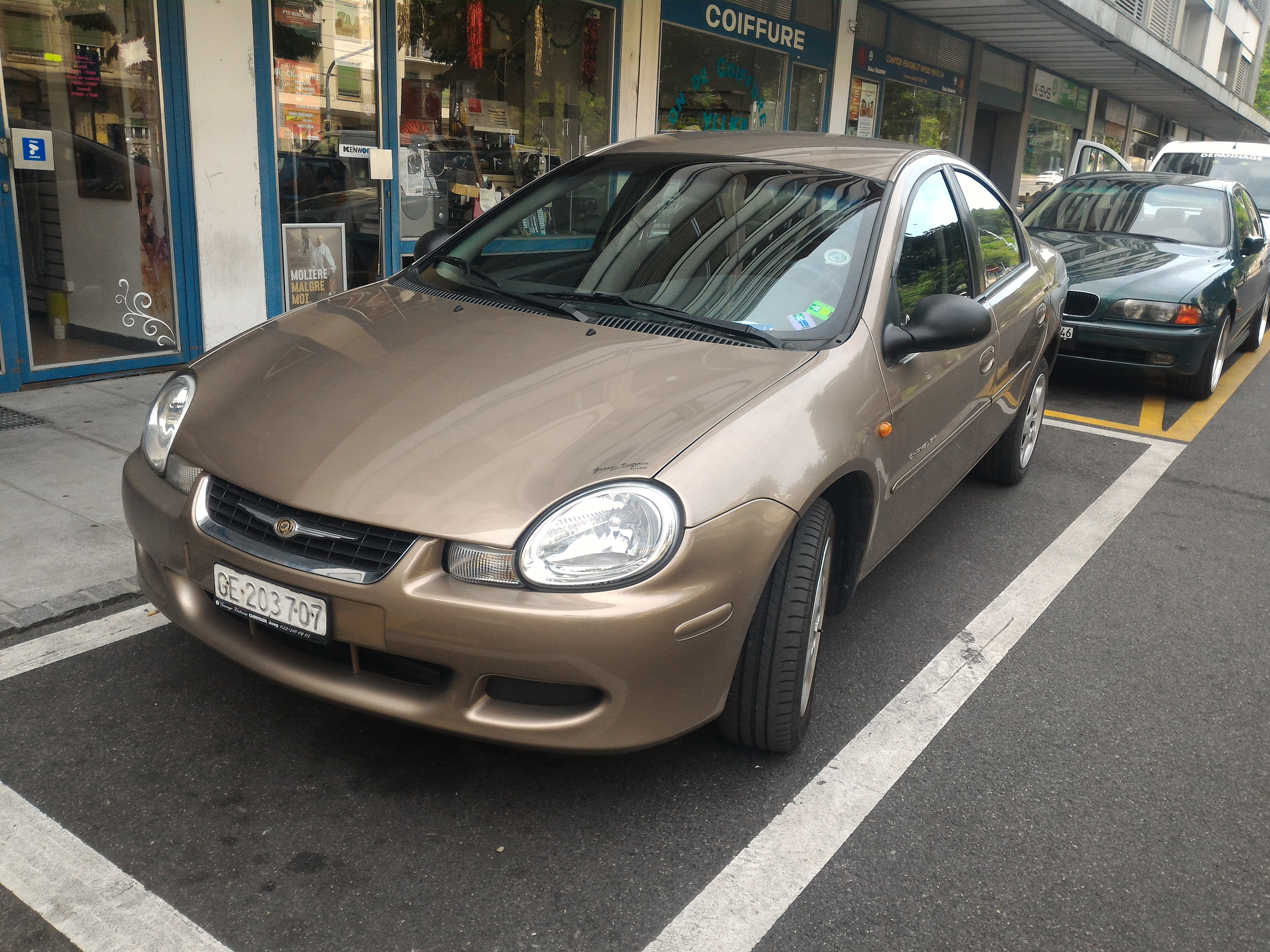
2000 Chrysler Neon (branded as the Dodge Neon in the United States), this Chrysler Neon was photographed in Switzerland

During the 1994 model run, various changes were made to the New Yorker. On the outside, New Yorker was switched to new accent-color body cladding, whereas LHS received body-color cladding. This change aligned the New Yorker with the Chrysler Concorde, which also had accent-color cladding. Instead of standard 15-inch and optional 16-inch wheels, the 16-inch wheels became standard, and the 15-inch versions were dropped. Likewise, the touring suspension option available on early 1994 New Yorker models was discontinued, leaving only "ride-tuned" suspension.

In 1995, the Chrysler Sebring was introduced as a coupe, replacing the LeBaron coupe, and the new JA platform Chrysler Cirrus replaced the outgoing LeBaron sedan. A year later, a convertible version of the Sebring went on the market and replaced the LeBaron convertible. In 1999, Chrysler introduced the new LH platform 300M sedan alongside a redesigned LHS. The 300M was originally designed to be the next-generation Eagle Vision, but since the Eagle brand had been discontinued in 1998, it instead became a Chrysler sedan.

=== 2000s ===
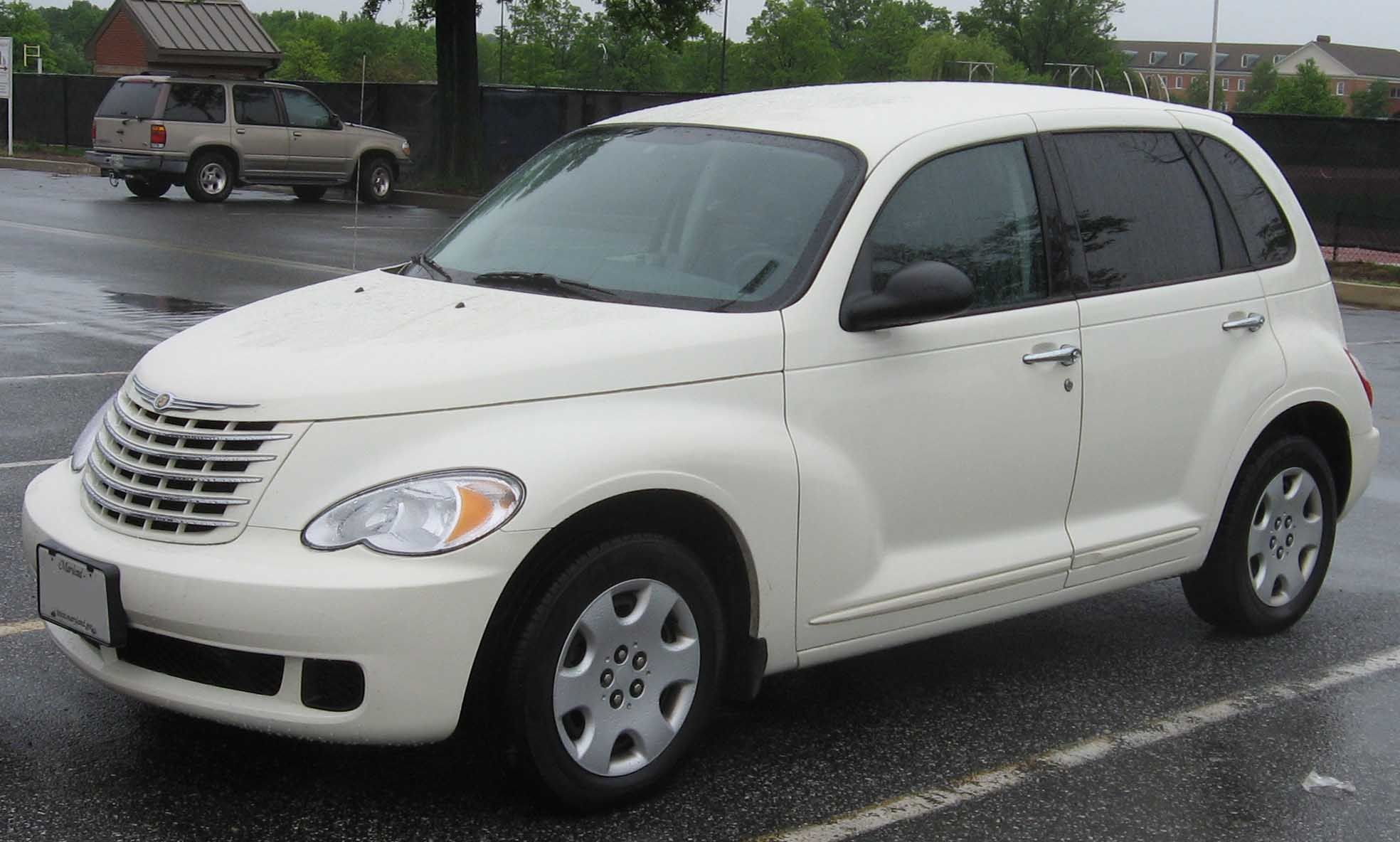
Chrysler PT Cruiser

In 2000, the Voyager and Grand Voyager minivans were repositioned as Chrysler models due to the phasing out of the Plymouth brand. In 2001, a sedan was added to the Sebring model line and served as a replacement for the discontinued Cirrus. That same year, the Chrysler brand added a retro-styled PT Cruiser as well as the Prowler roadster which had previously been a Plymouth model. By 2004, all Chrysler brand minivans were now sold under the Town & Country nameplate.

The 2000s also saw the Chrysler brand move into the fast-growing crossover/SUV segment with the introduction of the Chrysler Pacifica crossover in 2004 and the Chrysler Aspen SUV in 2007. The Pacifica would be discontinued in 2008 (the nameplate would return on a new minivan model in 2017), and the Aspen would be discontinued in 2009.

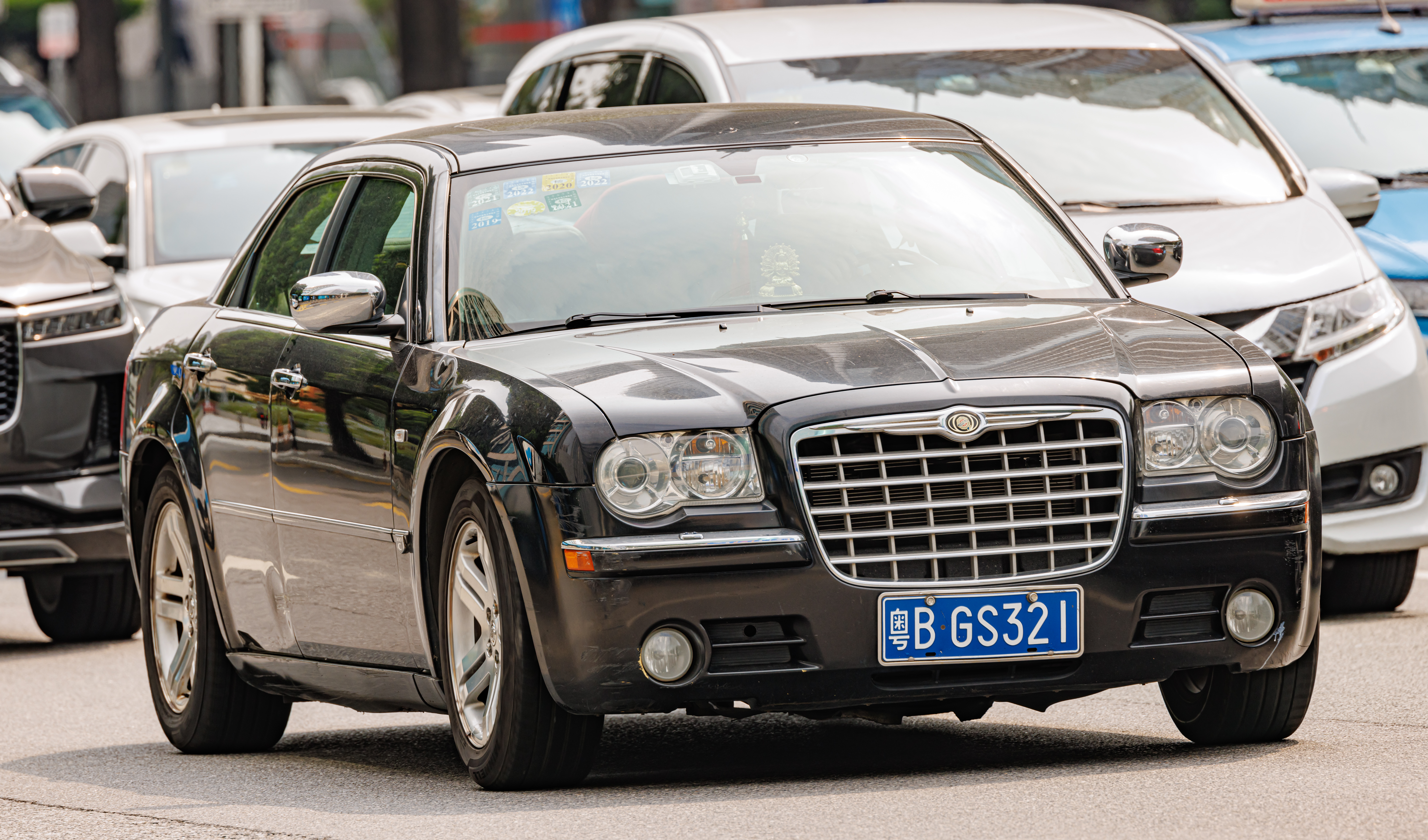
Chrysler 300C in Shenzhen, China

Between 2004 and 2008, Chrysler offered a two-seat coupe and convertible model called Crossfire. This was in addition to Chrysler's five-seat Sebring coupe (through 2005) and four-seat convertible being sold at the time.

In 2005, Chrysler introduced the LX platform Chrysler 300 sedan, which replaced both the 300M and Concorde. It was the brand's first rear-wheel-drive sedan since the discontinuation of the Chrysler Fifth Avenue in 1989. It was also the first time a Chrysler sedan was available with a V8 engine since 1989.

=== 2010s ===
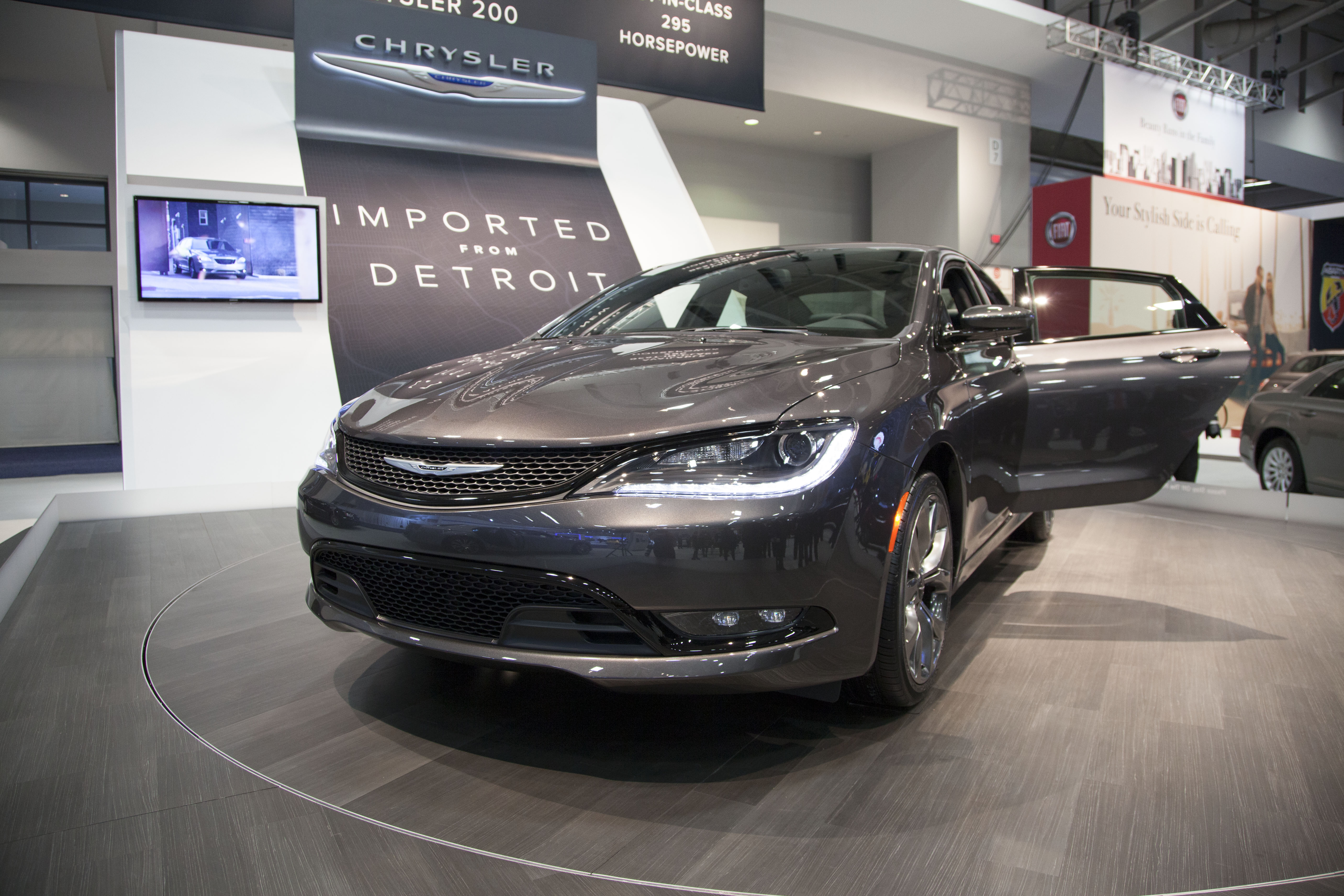
2014 Chrysler 200 at the Washington Auto Show

Chrysler Corporation began working with Italian automaker Fiat, culminating with the 2014 merger of the two companies. The newly formed Fiat Chrysler Automobiles (FCA) set a long-term goal of reviving the Chrysler brand as a full luxury brand to compete again with Cadillac and other luxury brands, partly by rebadging automobiles from other brands in the group. However, none of these plans ultimately came to fruition in the decade.

2011–2026 logo

In 2011, the brand's winged emblem was modified, eliminating the historic blue ribbon center which dated from the 1930s, replacing it with a blue-backed "Chrysler" nameplate. Also that year, the Chrysler 300 was restyled, and the Sebring was rebranded as the Chrysler 200. In May 2014, FCA announced it would make the brand a mainstream brand with premium features. A redesigned Chrysler 200 was introduced for 2015 but would be discontinued in 2017 as FCA shifted focus more towards SUVs and minivans. For 2017, the Chrysler Pacifica nameplate returned on a new minivan, replacing the long-running Town & Country, Voyager, and Grand Voyager.

During this time, Chrysler's quality and customer satisfaction ratings had been below average, according to Consumer Reports and J.D. Power. Chrysler did have a few quality successes during this period. Strategic Vision named Chrysler an overall winner in 2015 for strong customer appeal, and with the rise in quality of all cars, the difference between high and low "problem-counting" ratings is relatively small.

=== 2020s ===
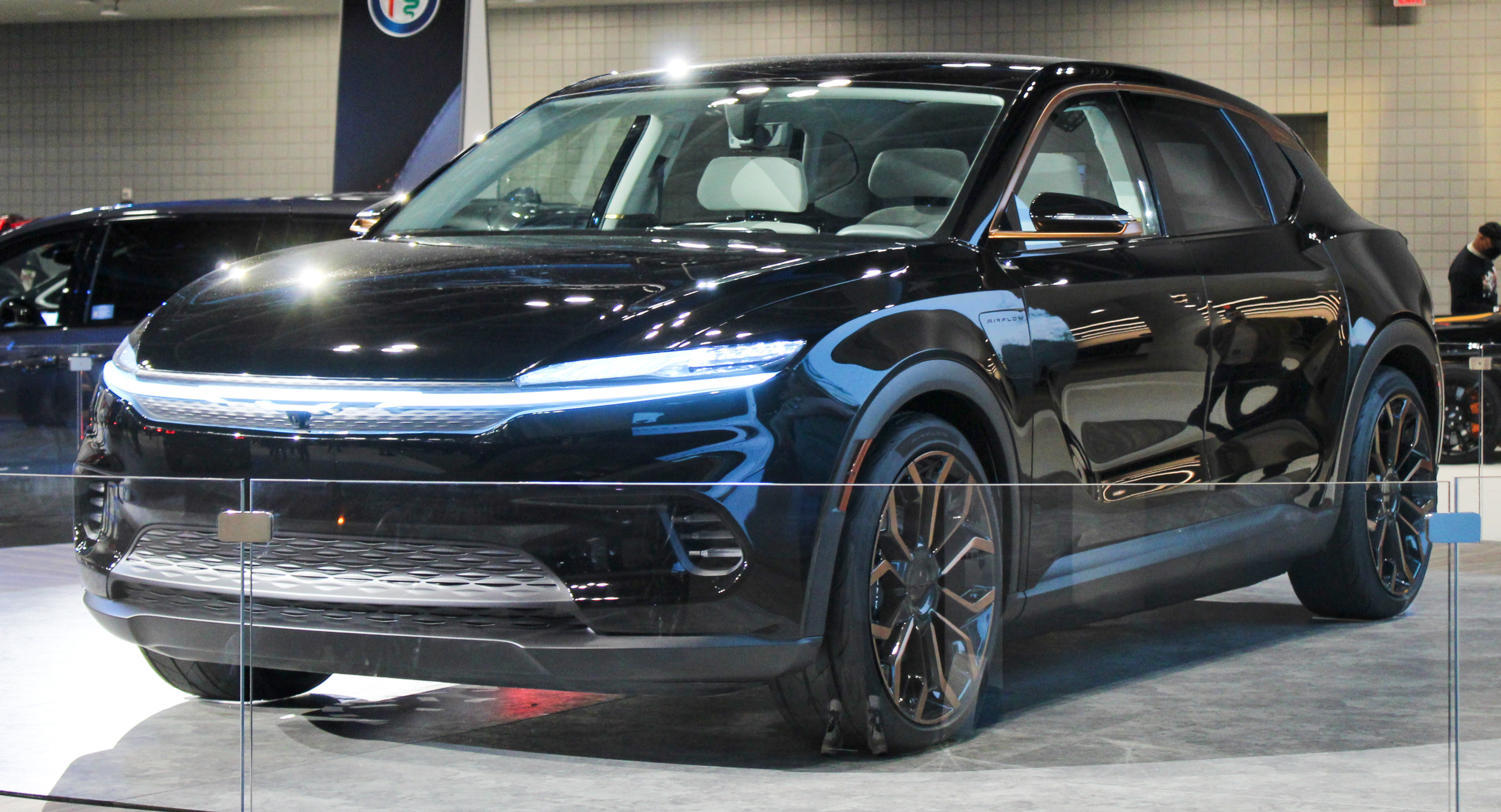
Chrysler Airflow Concept

In the early 2020s, Chrysler was facing an uncertain future with just two vehicle models in its lineup: the Chrysler Pacifica minivan and the Chrysler 300 sedan, which was last redesigned in 2010. In March 2023, Stellantis CEO Carlos Tavares said the brand would be "relaunched" with new models. One of those models is expected to be an electric crossover SUV by 2025, previewed by the Chrysler Airflow concept. In December 2023, the Chrysler 300 was discontinued. Furthermore, the company says it plans to make the Chrysler brand fully electric by 2028.

Chrysler's product lineup in North America by 2030 will include the Pacifica, Airflow, Arrow, and Arrow Cross.

== Leadership ==
- Walter Chrysler (1925–1935)
- K.T. Keller (1935–1950)
- Lester Lum "Tex" Colbert (1950–1961)
- Lynn Townsend (1961–1975)
- John J.Ricardo (1975–1978)
- Lee Iacocca (1978–1991)
- Robert Eaton (1992–1996)
- Thomas Stalkamp (1997–1999)
- Dieter Zetsche (2000–2005)
- Tom LaSorda (2006–2009)
- Sergio Marchionne (2009–2018)
- Mike Manley (2018–2021)
- Chris Feuell (2021–2026)
- Matt McAlear (2026–present)

== Current vehicles ==
As of 2026, the brand's current lineup consists solely of the Chrysler Pacifica minivan.
