= Dodge Charger R/T (1999 concept) =

Concept car developed by Dodge

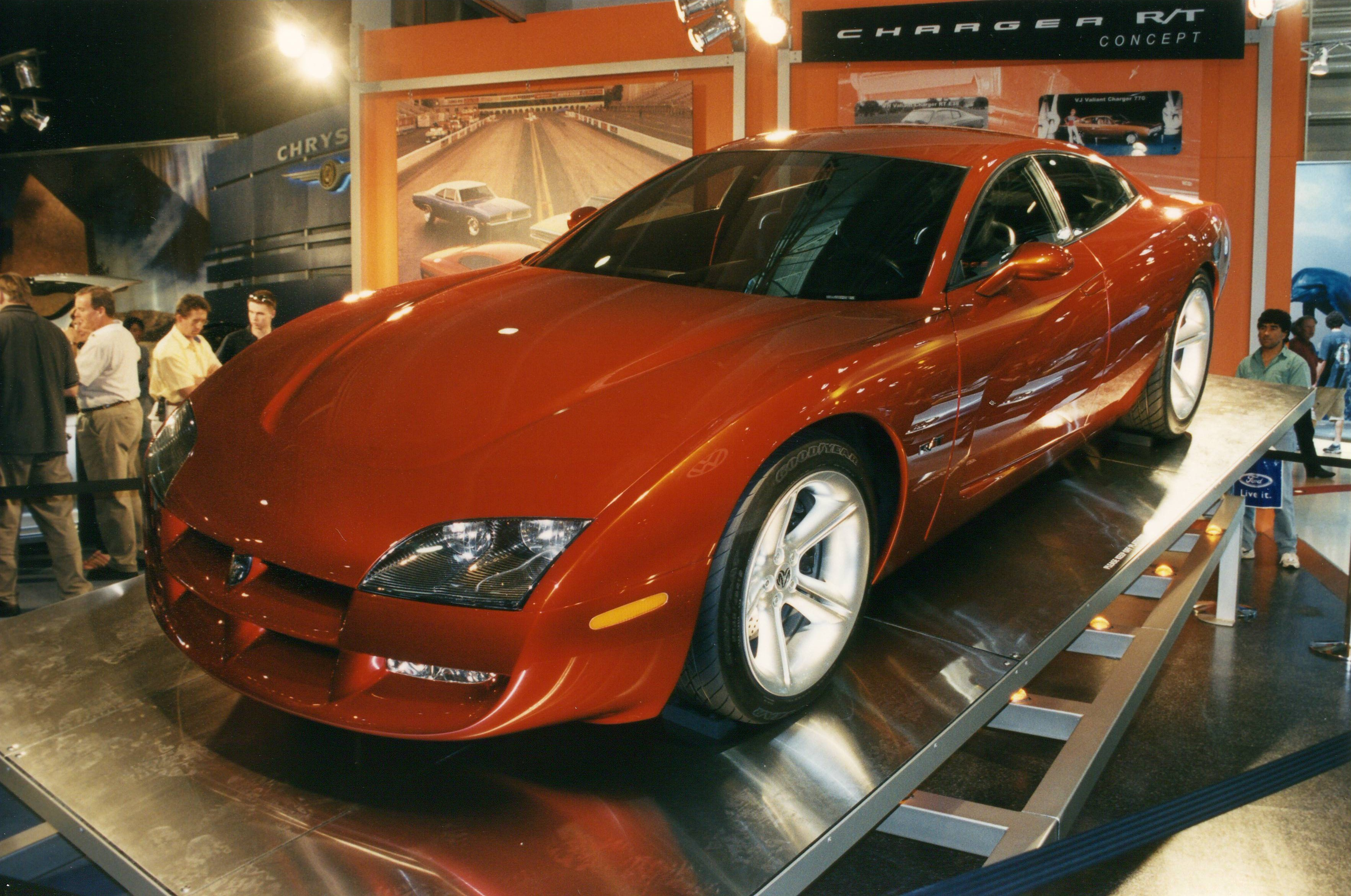

Overview
- Manufacturer: Dodge (DaimlerChrysler)
- Production: 1999
- Designer: Tom Gale

Body and chassis
- Class: Concept car
- Body style: 4-door sedan
- Layout: FR layout

Powertrain
- Engine: 4.7L V8
- Transmission: 5-speed manual

Dimensions
- Curb weight: 3,000 lb (1,361 kg)

The Dodge Charger R/T is a functional concept car developed in 1999 by American automobile manufacturer Chrysler. It took many styling cues from the 1960s Chargers (most notably the second generation) but, unlike the original, had four doors. The designers attempted to blend the rear doors into the design so they would not be noticed very easily. The decision to add four doors was due to the declining sport coupe market in North America. Compressed natural gas was purported as being in the lineup for a possible fuel source.

== Development History ==
The concept's exterior design was supervised by Tom Gale, head of Chrysler's styling department. The interior design was done by design partner Trevor Creed. While the concept car shared the long nose and rearward cab of the original 1966 Dodge Charger, it was shorter overall. It was 187 in (4,750 mm) long as compared to 203 in (5,156 mm) for the 1966 Charger. It was also lighter, 3,000 lb (1,361 kg) versus 3,650 lb (1,656 kg). Other design features shared with the 1966 Charger included coke-bottle styling, flying rear buttresses, full length taillamps and air intakes on the front and sides. The vehicle was fueled by CNG (compressed natural gas) technology. It had functional side scoops, and the chrome plated, central mounted exhaust was somewhat reminiscent of the Dodge Viper. The concept had functional air exhausters sculpted into its rear fascia. It used a new storage tank system to deliver a 300 mi (480 km) range while not compromising storage space in the trunk.

The interior of the car featured bucket seats for four occupants, a centre console running the full length of the dash board, a three-spoke steering wheel inspired by NASCAR race cars and rotary styled gauges. The interior was upholstered in black and red leather and had a carbon fiber trim. The centre console along with the back of the seats had exposed metal parts.

The cylinders, or pressure cells, inside the fiberglass storage tank were lined with a gas-impermeable high-density polyurethane (HDPE) thermoplastic and wrapped in a hybrid mix of high-strength carbon and glass filaments with an epoxy resin. The cylinders were laid into a foam egg crate to absorb impacts. The fuel could be stored at 3,600 lb³ of pressure. The car was powered by a 287 cubic inch 4.7-liter V8 engine with 2 valves per cylinder and a single overhead cam, rated at 325 hp (242 kW) at 6,000 rpm. The engine was mated to a five-speed manual transmission. This was the first rear-wheel-drive car built on the Chrysler LH platform, with all prior cars built on the same platform being front-wheel-drive. The car was rumored to accelerate from 0 to 60 mph in 5.3 seconds.

Following the Daimler Chrysler merger, the management went in another direction for the company, and the concept car was not placed into production. A newly developed Dodge Charger (LX) would not reach production until the 2006 model year. The new Charger bore little resemblance to the 1999 concept.

== In media ==
The car was featured in the video game Midnight Club 3: DUB Edition. It also appeared in the defunct game Planet Hot Wheels.

The car was featured in the 2003 animated film Hot Wheels: World Race driven by Wayne Casper.
