= Dodge Charger (2006) =

American full-size car

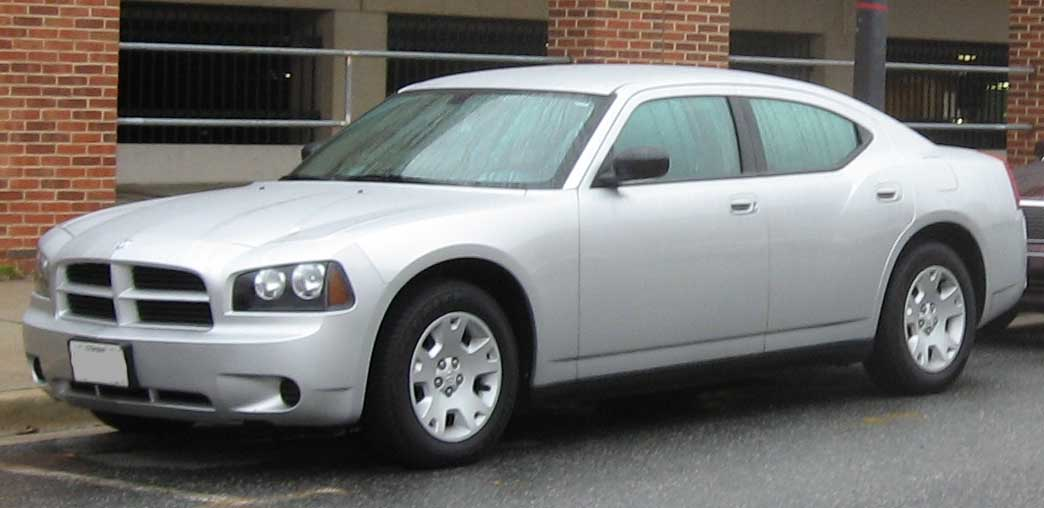

Overview
- Manufacturer: DaimlerChrysler (2005–2007); Chrysler LLC (2007–2009); Chrysler Group LLC (2009–2014); FCA US LLC (2014–2021); Stellantis North America (2021–2023)
- Production: April 2005–December 2023
- Model years: 2006–2010 (LX); 2011–2023 (LD)
- Assembly: Canada: Brampton, Ontario (Brampton Assembly)

Body and chassis
- Class: Full-size car (E)
- Body style: 4-door sedan
- Layout: Front engine, rear-wheel drive / four-wheel drive
- Platform: Chrysler LX

Chronology
- Predecessor: Dodge Intrepid
- Successor: Dodge Charger (2024)

The sixth and seventh-generation Dodge Charger are full-size four-door sedans, first introduced at the 2005 North American International Auto Show and built by American automobile manufacturer Stellantis North America, a subsidiary of Stellantis. It is available in rear-wheel drive or all-wheel drive drivetrains. The Charger was developed to continue the Dodge Charger line with its muscle car heritage, and replaced the Dodge Intrepid as Dodge's full-size sedan. The seventh-generation Charger debuted for the 2011 model year.

== History ==
The first Charger was a 1964 show car based on the Dodge Polara and Dodge Monaco/Royal Monaco and fitted with a 426 Wedge V8 engine. The first production Charger, based on the Dodge Coronet, was introduced as a 1966 model. There were several different vehicles bearing the Charger nameplate built on three different platforms and sizes, all bearing the Charger nameplate. Although the name is associated with the late-1960s performance model in the Dodge range, it was also used on personal luxury coupes during the late-1970s and on front-wheel-drive subcompact hatchbacks during the 1980s.

In 1999, Dodge introduced a new Charger R/T concept car. It took many styling cues from the 1960s Chargers, sharing their long nose and rearward cab, but was shorter at 187 in (4,750 mm), compared to 203 in (5,156 mm) for the 1966 Charger. It was also 650 lb (295 kg) lighter. It featured a four-door sedan body design, whereas all the previous production Chargers had two doors.

It was a return to a rear-wheel-drive sedan platform Dodge had not offered since the mid-size Dodge Diplomat had been discontinued in 1989.

In November 2021, Stellantis announced that 2023 model year would be the final model year for both the Dodge Charger and Dodge Challenger, as the company will focus its future plans on electric vehicles rather than fossil fuel powered vehicles, especially with tougher automotive emissions standards of being rolled out and required by the Environmental Protection Agency for the 2023 model year. The eighth-generation Charger was introduced in 2024, replacing the seventh-generation Charger and third-generation Challenger.

== Sixth generation (LX; 2006) ==
Sixth generation (LX)
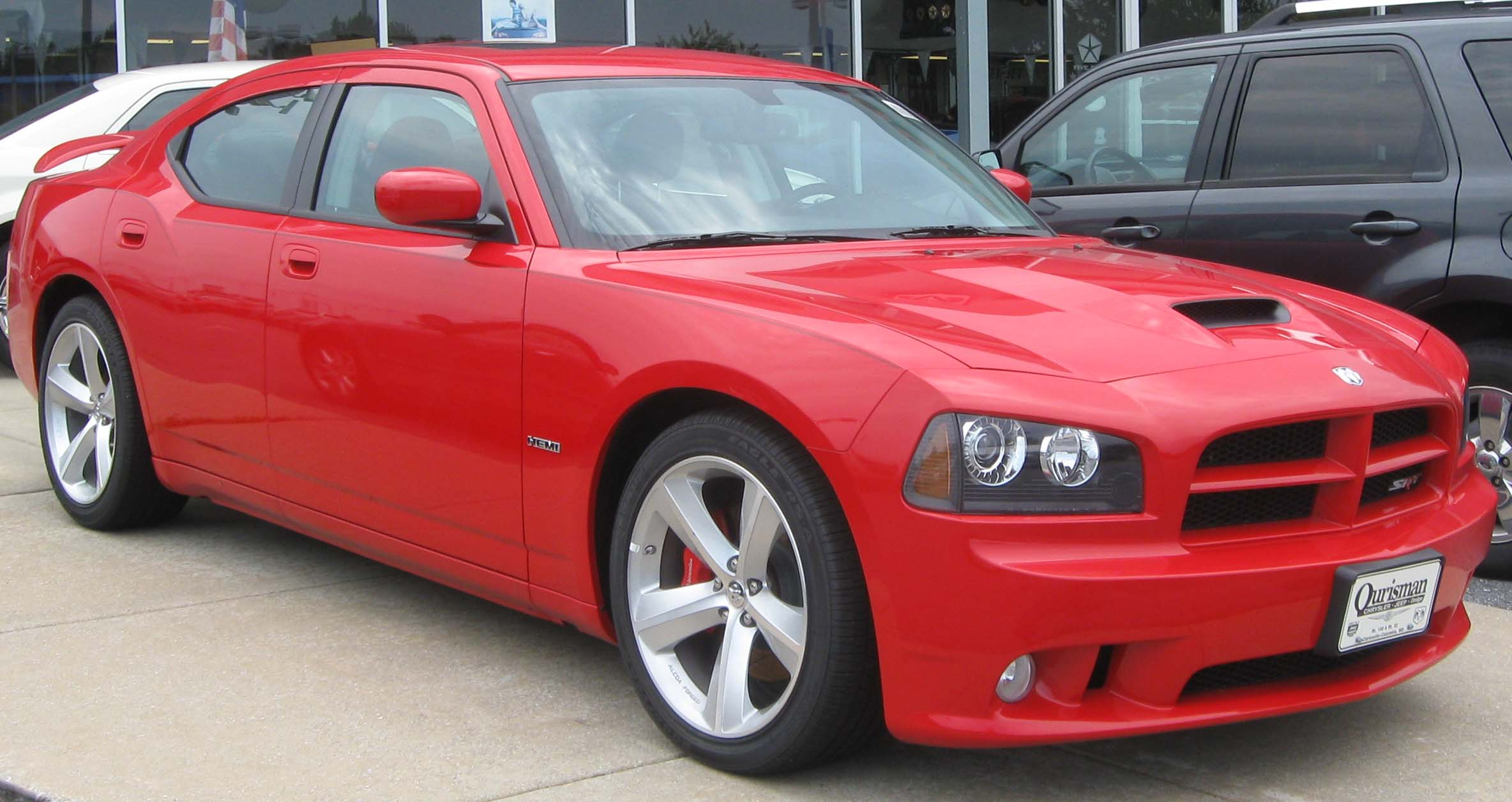
- 2010 Dodge Charger SRT8

Overview
- Production: April 2005 – November 2010
- Model years: 2006–2010
- Designer: Ralph Gilles (2002); Freeman Thomas (2002)

Body and chassis
- Related: Chrysler 300; Dodge Challenger; Dodge Magnum; Mercedes-Benz E-Class (W211)

Powertrain
- Engine: 2.7 L (167 cu in) EER V6; 3.5 L (215 cu in) EGG V6; 5.7 L (345 cu in) EZB/EZD HEMI V8; 6.1 L (370 cu in) ESF HEMI V8
- Transmission: 4-speed 42RLE automatic (2007–2010 2.7L, 2008–2010 3.5L RWD); 5-speed W5A580/5G-Tronic automatic; (2006–2007 3.5L RWD/AWD, 2008–2010 3.5L AWD, all V8)

Dimensions
- Wheelbase: 120.0 in (3,048.0 mm)
- Length: 200.1 in (5,082.5 mm)
- Width: 74.4 in (1,889.8 mm)
- Height: 58.2 in (1,478.3 mm); SRT8: 57.7 in (1,466 mm)
- Curb weight: 3,821–4,160 lb (1,733.2–1,886.9 kg)

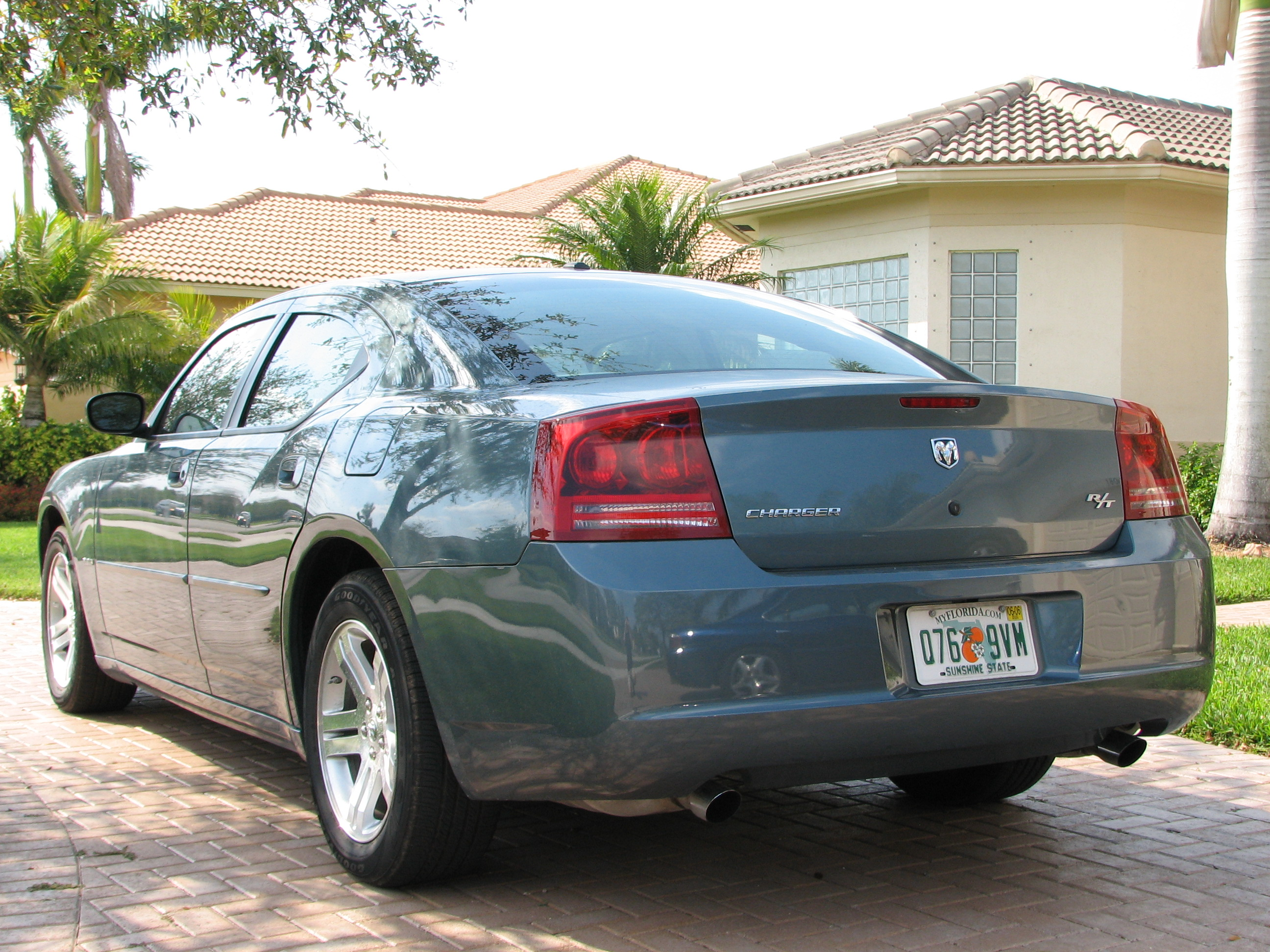
Rear view (Charger R/T)

The Dodge Charger is based on the rear-wheel-drive Chrysler LX platform, with Chrysler executives confirming that structural elements of the car's foundation such as the toe board, safety cage architecture, as well as the load-path philosophy, were being utilized by then-partner, Mercedes-Benz. Mercedes executives also confirmed that several individual components of the car are derived from the Mercedes-Benz E-Class (W211) and S-Class of the era. Shared and or derived components from Mercedes-Benz included: the rear suspension cradle and 5-link independent rear suspension design derived from E-Class, a double-wishbone front suspension design with short-and-long arm front suspension geometry with dual pivot steering geometry derived from the Mercedes-Benz S-Class (W220), the 5-speed NAG1 W5A580 transmission, rear differential, driveshaft, ESP & ABS systems, steering system, the CAN Bus electrical architecture, cabin electronics including several other electronic modules, switchgear such as the cruise control and turn signal combination stalk, seat controls, seat frames, and the wiring harness. Later models also feature a Mercedes-Benz-derived laser key ignition system in place of the traditional metal key. AWD models also benefited from the use of Mercedes-Benz's 4MATIC system, including transfer case components, The sixth generation Charger's competitors include cars such as the Ford Taurus and Five Hundred, Pontiac G8, Chevrolet Impala, Nissan Maxima, Hyundai Azera, and Toyota Avalon.

Both the SXT and R/T models were available in rear and all-wheel drive trains starting in 2007. The AWD system is engaged all the time, routing approximately 60% of the power to the rear wheels and 40% of the power to the front wheels.

After three years of production, an update for 2009 models was made. This sixth generation included relocating the rear decklid's "CHARGER" badging from the left to the right, making way for "DODGE" at the left. Tail lamps were also revised. 2008 models had seen minor revisions to the interior (a new center console and switchgear changes). The 2009 Charger AWD utilized the BorgWarner Torque-on-Demand system which disconnects the front axles until extra traction is needed. This results in a slight boost in fuel economy while retaining the same maximum power split to the front wheels.

=== Trim levels ===
The Dodge Charger was available in several trim levels:

The unnamed Base model was the entry-level model in the Charger lineup. Powered by the 2.7L "Magnum" V6 gasoline engine (starting with 2008 models) or a 3.5L "Magnum" V6 gasoline engine (for 2006 and 2007 models), mated to a four- or five-speed automatic transmission (06-07 models with 3.5L engines used the 5-speed regardless of drive type, while 2.7L cars were RWD only and used the 4-speed exclusively), the Base was equipped with features such as seventeen-inch black steel wheels with full plastic wheel covers, an AM/FM stereo radio with a single-disc CD player (with MP3 capabilities starting in 2008) and an auxiliary audio input jack, a four-speaker audio system, a urethane steering wheel, power brakes, a color-keyed front grille with black inserts, cloth seating surfaces, power windows and door locks, remote keyless entry, air conditioning, color-keyed exterior door handles, power-adjustable exterior side mirrors with black caps, a compact spare tire and wheel, and a split-folding rear bench seat, among other features. Options, while limited, included four-wheel Anti-lock Braking System (ABS) brakes, SiriusXM Satellite Radio, a six-speaker audio system, and a cruise control. This model was only available with rear-wheel drive.

The SE Plus model was only offered for the 2008 model year and added features onto the unnamed Base trim. These added features included SiriusXM Satellite Radio, a six-speaker audio system, the 3.5 L "Magnum" V6 gasoline engine, a cruise control, four-wheel power Anti-lock Braking System (ABS) brakes, and seventeen-inch aluminum-alloy wheels. This model was only available with rear-wheel drive.

The SXT was the volume seller of the Charger lineup. Originally available as an appearance package for the unnamed Base model until 2007, the SXT became its own trim level starting with the 2008 model year. Features added onto to the Base trim included a chrome front grille with black inserts, SiriusXM Satellite Radio (starting with 2008 models), a six-speaker audio system, steering wheel-mounted audio system controls, a security alarm system, a leather-wrapped steering wheel and automatic transmission shift lever, a cruise control, four-wheel power Anti-lock Braking System (ABS) brakes, a power-adjustable front driver's bucket seat, and the 3.5L "Magnum" V6 gasoline engine (starting with 2008 models). Options on the SXT included eighteen-inch tires and aluminum-alloy wheels, an AM/FM stereo radio with a six-disc, in-dash CD/MP3 changer (including DVD and DVD Audio playback starting in 2008), a touchscreen infotainment system (starting with 2008 models), a U Connect hands-free Bluetooth phone system, two different Boston Acoustics audio systems (one with a subwoofer), Digital Sound Processing (DSP), and an external amplifier, a GPS navigation system, a rearview backup camera system, a remote vehicle starter system, luxury leather-trimmed seating surfaces, dual power-adjustable front bucket seats, a five-speed automatic transmission, and a power sunroof. This model was available with either rear-wheel drive or All Wheel Drive (AWD).

The R/T was the performance-oriented Charger model. It added features onto the SXT trim such as the 5.7 L HEMI V8 gasoline engine with the Multi-Displacement System (MDS), a five-speed automatic transmission, a six-speaker Boston Acoustics premium audio system with a 276-watt external amplifier and Digital Sound Processing (DSP), SiriusXM Satellite Radio (starting with 2008 models), eighteen-inch tires and polished aluminum-alloy wheels, exterior body side moldings, luxury leather-trimmed seating surfaces, dual power-adjustable front bucket seats, power-adjustable and heated exterior side mirrors with color-keyed caps, a dual-zone automatic climate control system, a rear spoiler, and front fog lamps. Most options available on the SXT trim were also available on the R/T trim. This model was available with either rear-wheel drive (RWD) or All Wheel Drive (AWD). A Road/Track Performance Group was available on RWD cars, which added 4-10 bhp, depending on year (achieved with a less restrictive air intake tract and exhaust), a different steering rack (referred to as a '9-land' steering gear in contemporary marketing materials), a stiffer suspension, subtly different wheels with black accents (2006 only, 2007–10 models had 20-inch wheels included with the package) fitted with performance tires, 'Heritage' R/T badging, and different seats with more aggressive bolstering (shared with the SRT8); 2007–10 models also included a front chin spoiler and rear wing spoiler. Unlike the Daytona R/T (which included all of the package's contents and added an even less restrictive muffler and special colors, badging, and striping), there was no production limit.

The SRT8 was the top trim level of the Charger lineup. It added features onto the R/T trim such as the 6.1L HEMI V8 gasoline engine without the Multi-Displacement System (MDS), Brembo performance front and rear brakes with painted brake calipers, sport front bucket seats, dual heated front bucket seats, an AM/FM stereo radio with an in-dash, six-disc CD/MP3 changer (including DVD and DVD Audio playback starting with 2008 models), SiriusXM Satellite Radio (starting with 2008 models), sport leather-trimmed seating surfaces with perforated microfiber suede inserts, a color-keyed front grille with black "Honeycomb" inserts, a performance body kit, twenty-inch performance-rated tires, and forged aluminum-alloy wheels, electronic stability and traction controls, and simulated carbon-fiber interior trim. Optional features included touchscreen infotainment system (starting with 2008 models), SiriusXM satellite Radio (for 2006 and 2007 models), a navigation system, U Connect hands-free Bluetooth phone system, and a 13-speaker Kicker audio system with a powered amplifier, Digital Sound Processing (DSP), and a rear trunk-mounted subwoofer. This model was only available with rear-wheel drive.

==== SRT8 ====
An SRT8 version of the Charger debuted at the 2005 New York International Auto Show. Powered by a 425 hp (431 PS; 317 kW) version of the 6.1 L (370 cu in) Hemi V8, it also featured upgraded Brembo brakes, and interior and exterior updates. The engine is rated at 420 lb⋅ft (569 N⋅m) of torque at 4,800 rpm. The 425 SAE net horsepower of the modern 6.1 L Hemi makes it more powerful than the Chrysler Hemi engines of the muscle car era, the biggest of which were rated at 425 SAE gross horsepower. This made the 6.1 L Hemi the most powerful V8 engine that Chrysler had put in a production vehicle at the time. The SRT8 can accelerate from 0–60 mph (0–97 km/h) in 4.8 seconds (5.0 average).

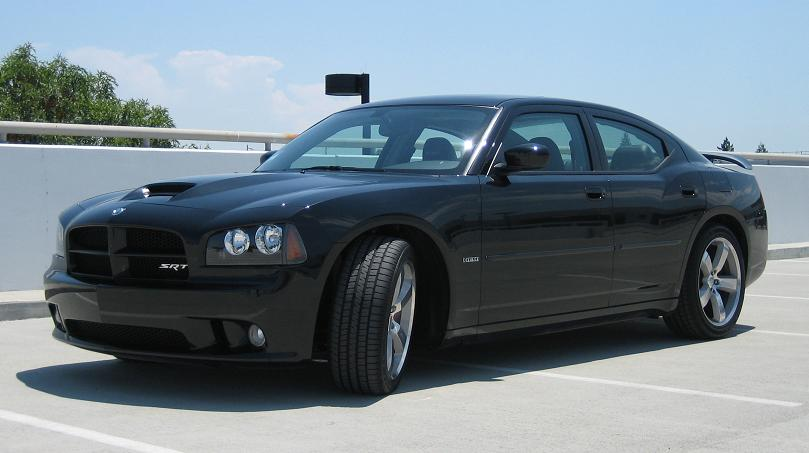
2006 Dodge Charger SRT8 in Brilliant Black

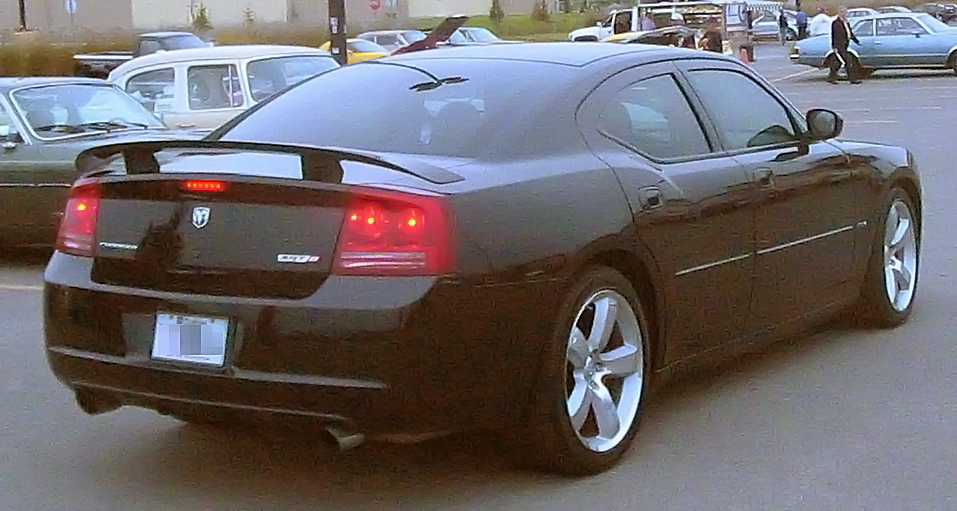
2007 Dodge Charger SRT8 in Brilliant Black

=== Special editions ===
==== Daytona R/T ====
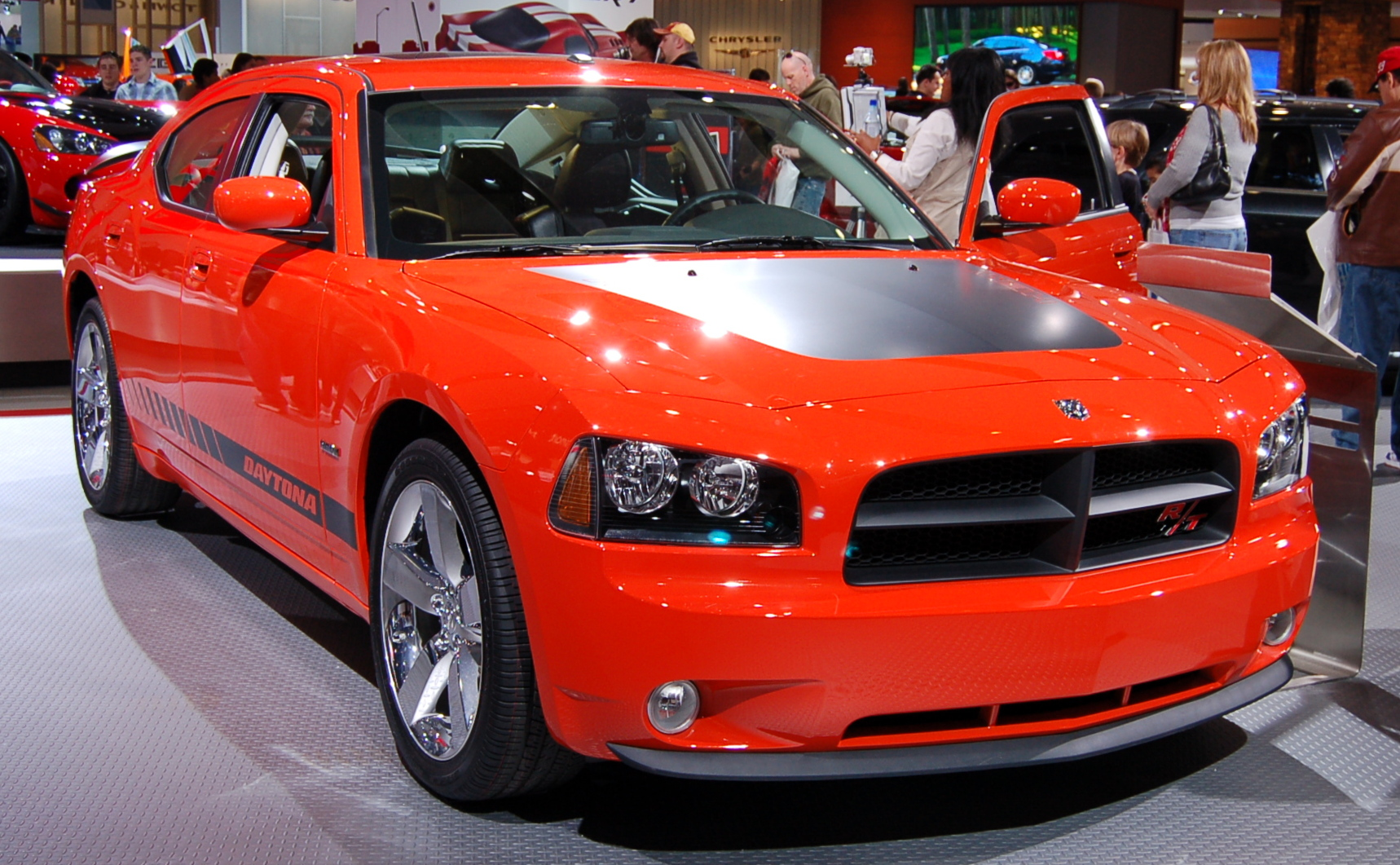
Dodge Charger Daytona R/T

The 2006 Charger Daytona R/T debuted at the Chicago Auto Show. It featured a high output 350 hp (261 kW) version of the 5.7 L (345 cu in) Hemi as well as an updated suspension and tires. Visual additions included a special front fascia with a chin spoiler and a black rear spoiler. In a retro touch, the Daytona R/T featured black "Hemi" decals on the hood and rear fender and retro high impact colors.

The 2006 Dodge Charger R/T Daytona Limited colors were "Go ManGo!" (orange with black decals and spoiler (punctuation in the name is correct, as displayed on the dashboard), "Top Banana" (yellow with black decals and spoiler)), "Tor Red" (red with black decals and spoiler (punctuation in the name is correct, as displayed on the dashboard)). The U.S. production release was limited to 4,000 cars each for orange and yellow, 2,000 for the red, and they had a badge with a production number placed under the far-right dash vent.

In 2007, larger 20-inch chrome-clad wheels were introduced, now being produced only in two new colors with a combined total of 2900 built in the U.S. with 1500 being Sub Lime Green and 1400 Plum Crazy Purple. Daytonas were again numbered with badges on the right of the dash. In 2008, a revised stripe package was adopted, and the color for this year was HEMI Orange. In 2009, horsepower was increased to 372 hp (277 kW) by the addition of Variable Camshaft Timing. The color for this year was Stone White. There was no Daytona R/T for the 2010 model year.

==== Super Bee ====
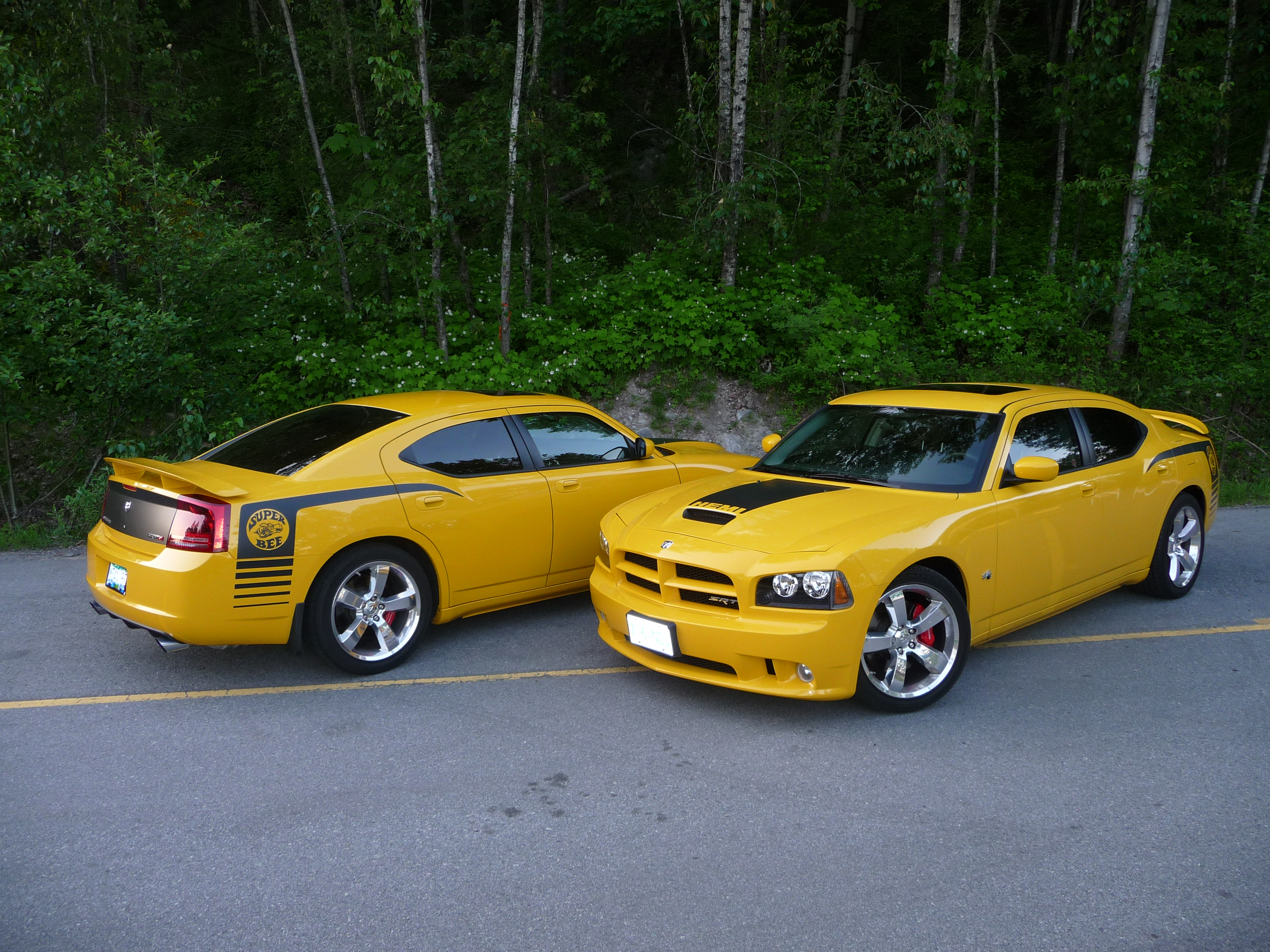
Dodge Charger SRT8 Super Bee

A new Super Bee version of the Charger debuted at the 2006 New York International Auto Show for the 2007 model year. It shared the SRT8's 425 hp (317 kW) 6.1 L (370 cu in) Hemi engine, but was available in a special "Detonator Yellow" paint with black decals. It was a limited edition with only 1,000 being produced. A B5 Blue version of the Super Bee was shown at the 2007 North American International Auto Show and went on sale in early 2008, also with a limited run of 1,000. A total of 425 Hemi Orange Super Bees were built in 2009.

==== DUB Edition ====
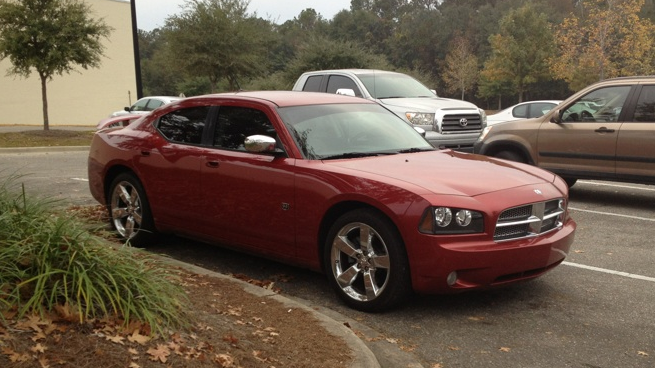
2008 Dodge Charger DUB Edition

Developed in collaboration with DUB Magazine, this version is based on the Charger SXT. It features a body-color spoiler and fog lamps, 20-inch alloy wheels with 245/45R20 tires, MyGIG Multimedia Infotainment System with 13-speaker Puncher surround-sound system, and a 322w Kicker amplifier, a 100-watt Kicker subwoofer, and upgraded brakes from the R/T models that use dual-piston calipers in the front. Exterior colors are red, black, silver, cool vanilla, and dark titanium.

A total of 2,180 Charger DUB Edition cars were produced for the U.S. market.

=== Engines ===
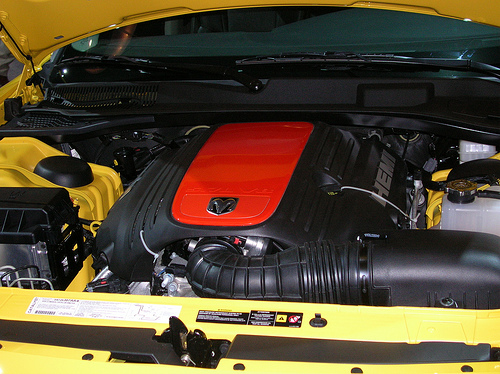
5.7 L Hemi

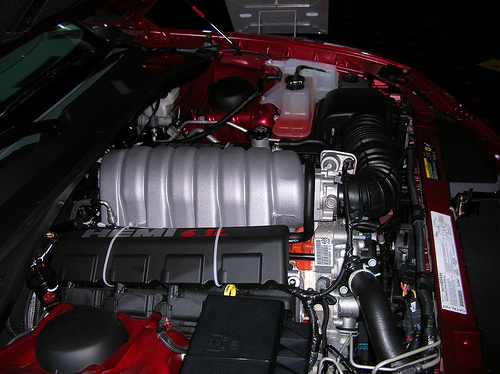
6.1 L Hemi

The Charger SE and SXT are equipped with the 3.5L High Output engine, rated at 250 hp (186 kW) and 250 lb⋅ft (339 N⋅m) of torque. In Canada, the base model Charger has a 2.7 L V6, which is rated at 178 hp (133 kW) and 190 lb⋅ft (258 N⋅m) of torque. In 2006, the 2.7 L V6 was also available in the U.S. for fleet sales only. For 2007, the SE package could be had with the 2.7 L engine. The Canadian SXT model included the 3.5 L V6.

The R/T version uses the 5.7 L Hemi V8 engine. From 2006 to 2008, this engine was rated at 340 hp (254 kW) and 390 lb⋅ft (529 N⋅m) of torque. For 2009, Variable Camshaft Timing was added, raising power output levels to 368 hp (274 kW) and 395 lb⋅ft (536 N⋅m) of torque respectively.

The SRT8 model comes with the 6.1 L (370 cu in) Hemi V8, which is rated at 425 hp (317 kW) and 420 lb⋅ft (569 N⋅m) of torque.

Year	Model	Engine	Power	Torque
2006–2010	SE	2.736 L; 167.0 cu in (2,736 cc); EER V6	178 hp (133 kW)	190 lb⋅ft (258 N⋅m)
2006–2010	SXT (G/H/N/P/R Packs)	3.518 L; 214.7 cu in (3,518 cc); EGG V6	250 hp (186 kW)	250 lb⋅ft (339 N⋅m)
2006–2008	R/T	5.7 L; 345.0 cu in (5,654 cc); Hemi EZB V8	340 hp (254 kW)	390 lb⋅ft (529 N⋅m)
2006–2008	R/T with Road/Track Performance Group	5.7 L; 345.0 cu in (5,654 cc); Hemi EZB V8	350 hp (261 kW)	390 lb⋅ft (529 N⋅m)
2006–2008	Daytona R/T	5.7 L; 345.0 cu in (5,654 cc); Hemi EZB V8	350 hp (261 kW)	390 lb⋅ft (529 N⋅m)
2009–2010	R/T	5.7 L; 345.0 cu in (5,654 cc); Hemi EZD V8	368 hp (274 kW)	395 lb⋅ft (536 N⋅m)
2009–2010	R/T with Road/Track Performance Group	5.7 L; 345.0 cu in (5,654 cc); Hemi EZD V8	372 hp (277 kW)	395 lb⋅ft (536 N⋅m)
2006–2010	SRT8	6.1 L; 369.7 cu in (6,059 cc); Hemi ESF V8	425 hp (317 kW)	420 lb⋅ft (569 N⋅m)

=== Safety ===
The Insurance Institute for Highway Safety gives the Charger an overall Good score in frontal crash tests. In side impacts Charger models equipped with optional side airbags are given a Marginal score overall, and models without side airbags are given the lowest overall Poor score.

The National Highway Traffic Safety Administration gives the Charger five stars on passenger, driver, and rear passenger crash test ratings and four stars in regard to side-impact rating.

All models come standard with electronic stability program (ESP) (except in 2.7L V6 cars where it is optional) with ABS and all speed traction control.

IIHS:
Moderate overlap front	Good
Side	Poor
Head restraints & seats	Marginal

NHTSA 2010 Dodge Charger RWD:
Overall:	5/5 stars
Frontal Driver Side:	5/5 stars
Frontal Passenger Side:	5/5 stars
Side Driver:	5/5 stars
Rear Passenger:	5/5 stars
Rollover Star Rating 4x4:	/ 10.90%
Rollover Star Rating 4x2:	/ 10.90%

== Seventh generation (LD; 2011) ==
Seventh generation (LD)
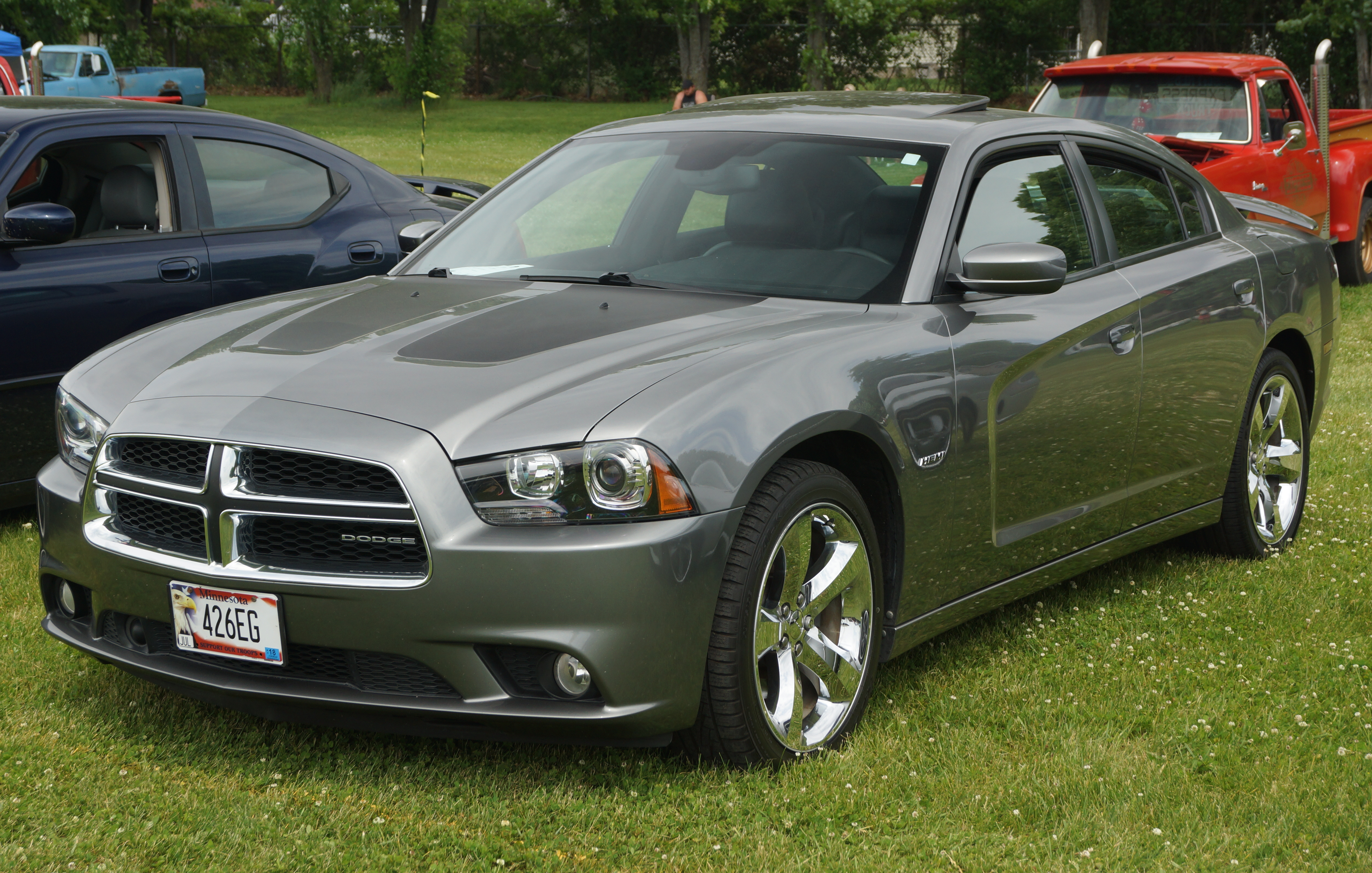
- 2011 Dodge Charger

Overview
- Production: November 2010 – December 2023
- Model years: 2011–2023

Body and chassis
- Related: Chrysler 300; Dodge Challenger (2008)

Powertrain
- Engine: 3.6 L (220 cu in) Pentastar V6; 5.7 L (345 cu in) Eagle EZD HEMI V8; 6.2 L (376 cu in) Hellcat supercharged V8; 6.4 L (391 cu in) ESG HEMI V8
- Transmission: 5-speed W5A580 automatic (2011–14 V6 and V8; 2011–20 Charger Pursuit); 8-speed 845RE automatic (Optional, 2012–2014 V6s. Standard on V6s as of 2015 except Pursuit); 8-speed 850RE automatic (2021–2023 Charger Pursuit V6); 8-speed 8HP70 automatic (2015–2023, non-Hellcat V8s; 2021–2023 Charger Pursuit V8); 8-speed 8HP90 automatic (2015–2023, Hellcat only)

Dimensions
- Wheelbase: 120.2–120.4 in (3,053.1–3,058.2 mm) (most versions 120 in (3,048.0 mm) (Scat Pack Widebody, 2020 SRT Hellcat)
- Length: 200.2 in (5,084 mm)
- Width: 75.0 in (1,905 mm); 78.3 in (1,989 mm) (Scat Pack Widebody)
- Height: 58.5 in (1,485 mm)
- Curb weight: 4,021–4,530 lb (1,824–2,055 kg)

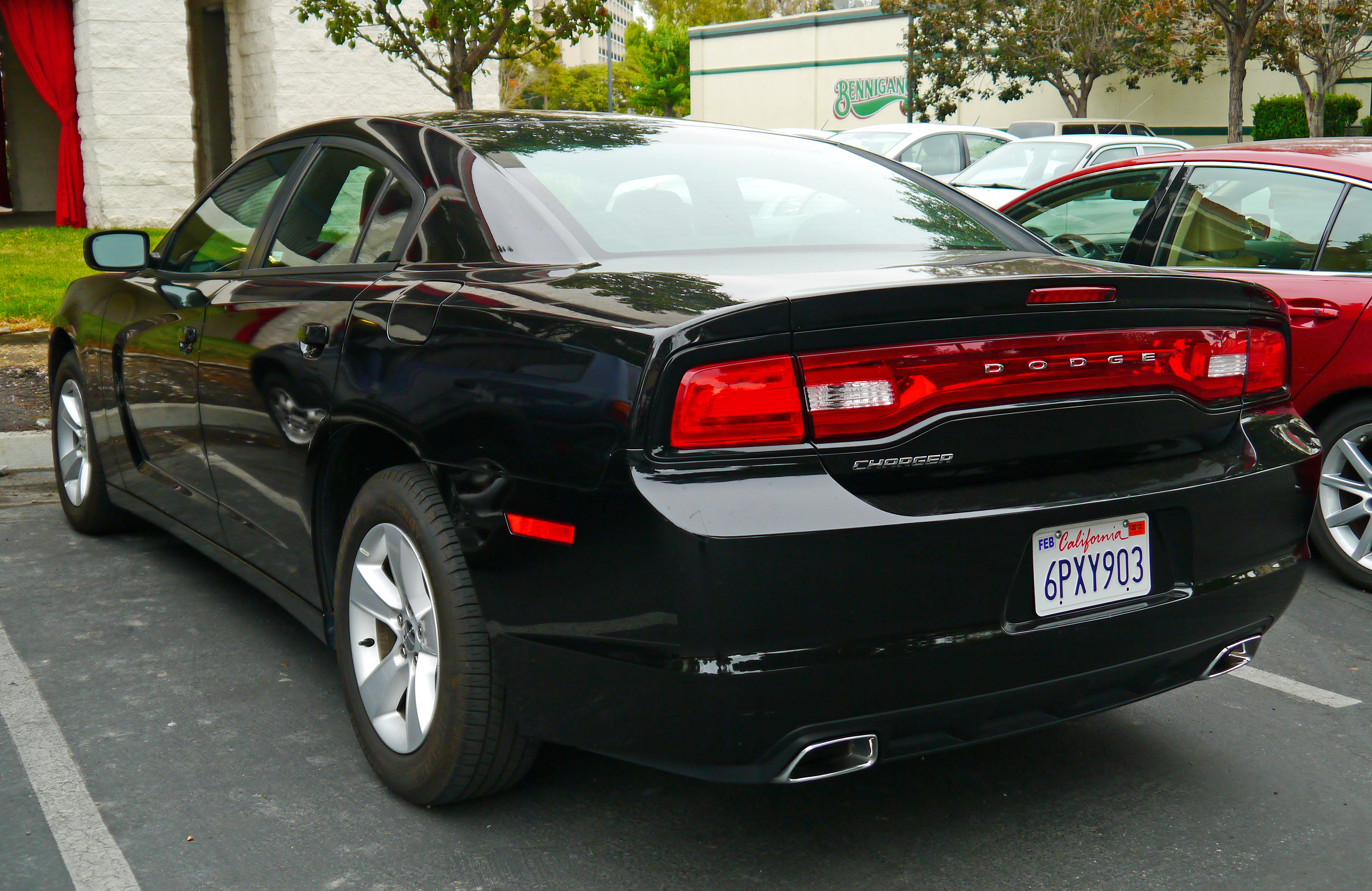
Rear view

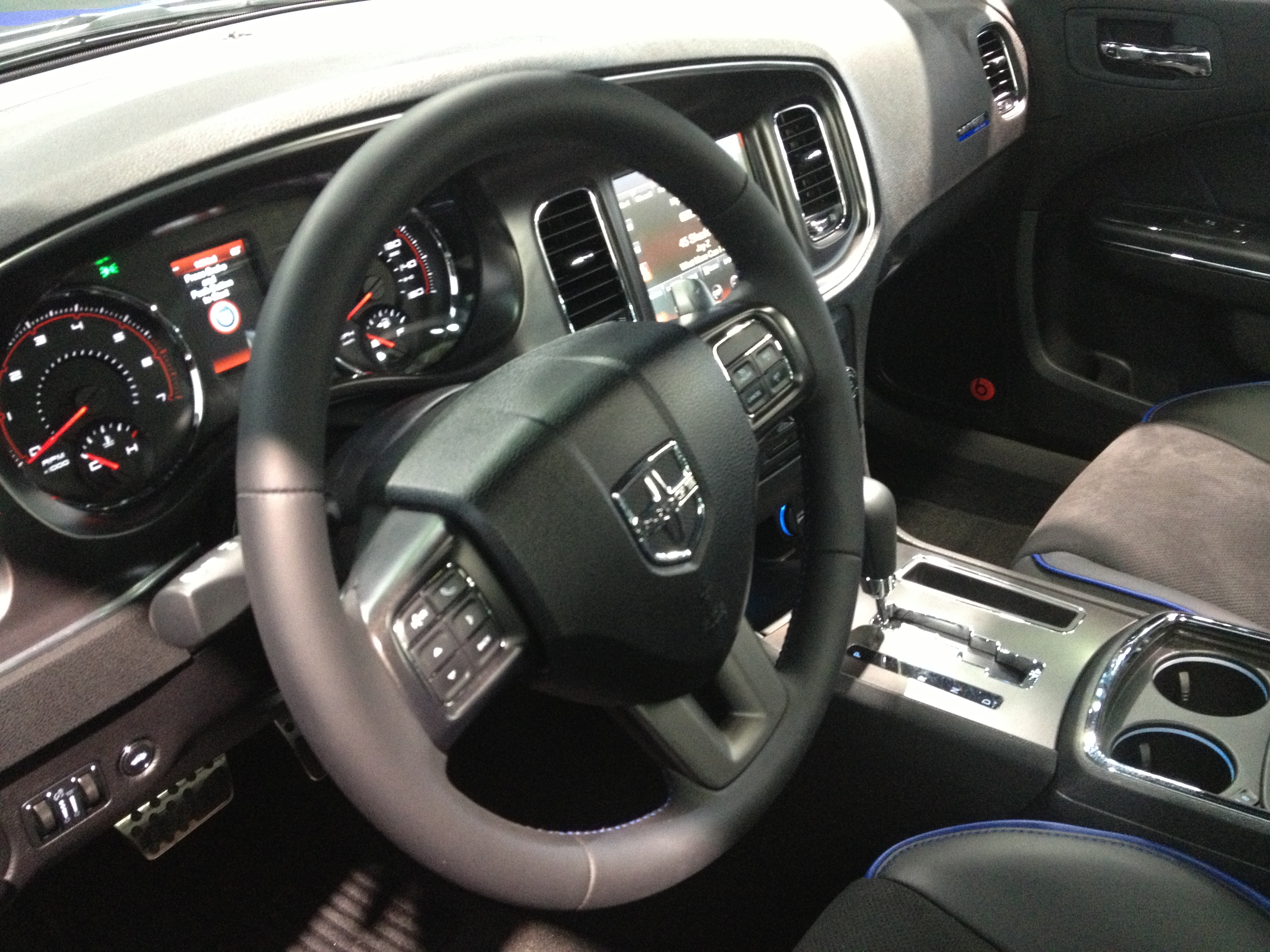
Interior

The 2011 LD Charger seventh generation underwent both exterior and interior changes, taking some styling cues from the 1968–1970 models. A new body featured a redesigned fascia and hood section, modified "racetrack" vintage-style taillights, and a new dashboard. Silver aluminum wheels became standard equipment replacing the previous plastic caps.

=== Powertrain ===
The new 3.6 L Pentastar V6 engine replaced the 2.7 L V6 engine as well as the 3.5 L High Output V6 engine. The 3.6 L Pentastar has variable valve timing and uses a timing chain instead of a belt. The exhaust manifold is cast directly into the cylinder head.

The Charger was built alongside the 2011 Challenger SRT8 392 and Chrysler 300C. Engines are available with both the 5-speed and 8-speed automatic transmissions.

Model	Engine	Displacement	Power	Torque	Years	Top Speed	0-60 mph (0–97 km/h) Acceleration (seconds)
SE	3.6 V6 Pentastar	3,604 cc (219.9 cu in)	292 hp (218 kW; 296 PS) at 6,350 rpm	260 lb⋅ft (353 N⋅m) at 4,800 rpm	2011–2023	124 mph (200 km/h) (limited)	6.4
SXT	3.6 V6 Pentastar	3,604 cc (219.9 cu in)	292 hp (218 kW; 296 PS) at 6,350 rpm	260 lb⋅ft (353 N⋅m) at 4,800 rpm	2011–2023	124 mph (200 km/h) (limited)	6.4
GT (2019), SXT w/performance package	3.6 V6 Pentastar	3,604 cc (219.9 cu in)	300 hp (224 kW; 304 PS) at 6,350 rpm	264 lb⋅ft (358 N⋅m) at 4,800 rpm	2012–2023	140 mph (225 km/h) (limited)	6.2
R/T	5.7 L V8 HEMI	5,654 cc (345.0 cu in)	370 hp (276 kW; 375 PS) at 5,250 rpm	395 lb⋅ft (536 N⋅m) at 4,200 rpm	2011–2023	155 mph (249 km/h) (limited)	5.1
SRT8	6.4 L V8 HEMI Apache	6,409 cc (391.1 cu in)	470 hp (350 kW; 477 PS)	470 lb⋅ft (637 N⋅m)	2012–2014	175 mph (282 km/h)	4.3
SRT 392, R/T Scat Pack	6.4 L V8 HEMI Apache	6,409 cc (391.1 cu in)	485 hp (362 kW; 492 PS) at 6000 rpm	475 lb⋅ft (644 N⋅m) 4100 – 4200 rpm	2015–2023	185 mph (298 km/h)	4.1
SRT Hellcat	6.2 L V8 HEMI Hellcat	6,162 cc (376.0 cu in)	707 hp (527 kW; 717 PS) at 6000 rpm	650 lb⋅ft (881 N⋅m) at 4000 rpm	2015–2023	204 mph (328 km/h)	3.4
SRT Hellcat Redeye	6.2 L V8 HEMI Hellcat	6,162 cc (376.0 cu in)	797 hp (594 kW; 808 PS) at 6300 rpm	707 lb⋅ft (959 N⋅m) at 4500 rpm	2021–2023		

==== Charger Mopar Designs Edition ====
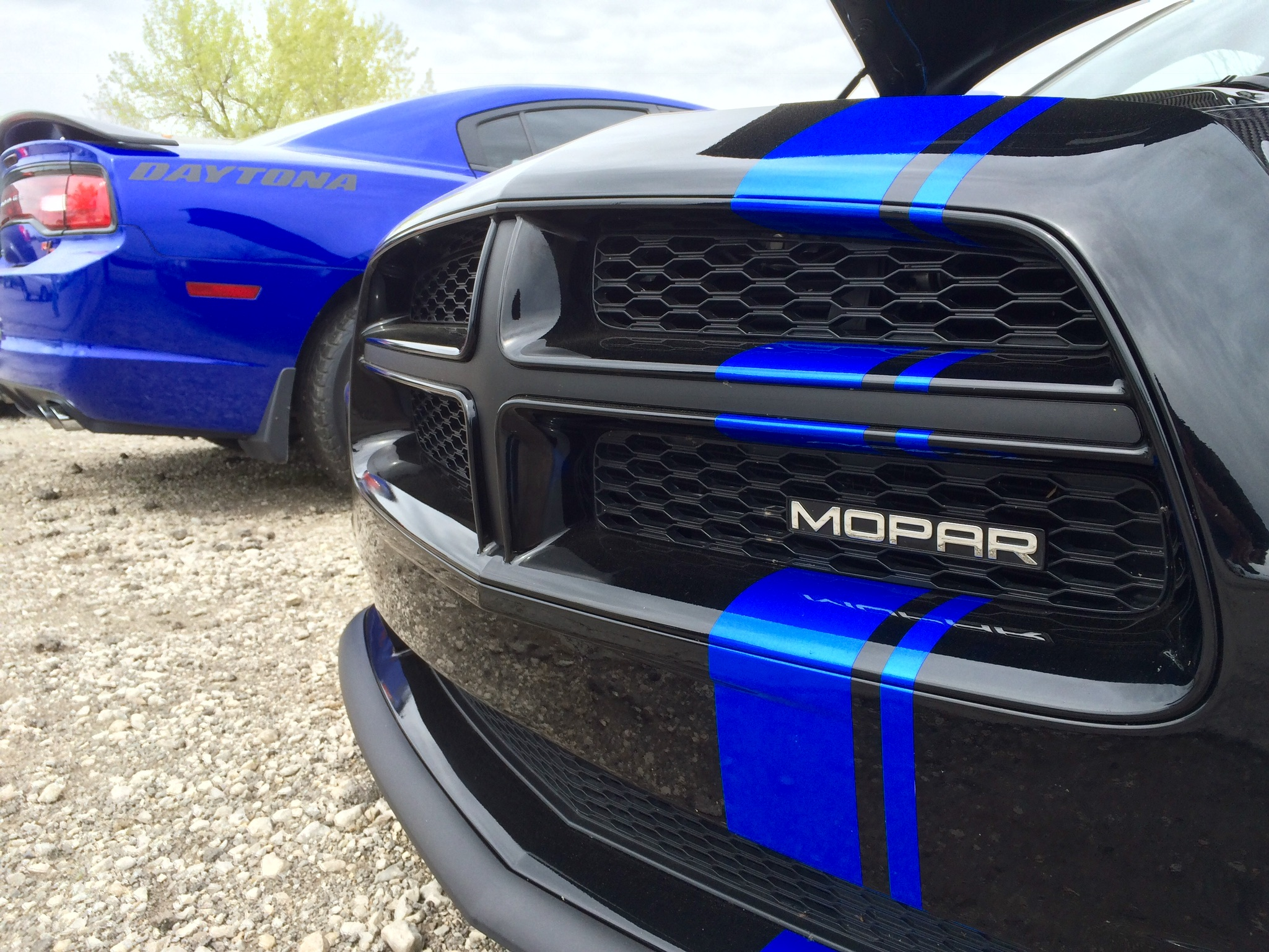
Mopar 11 Dodge Charger grille emblem and stripe

In 2011 Dodge introduced the Dodge Charger R/T Mopar 11 Edition. In the Mopar Edition, there are several appearance and performance changes to set it apart from the rest of the production models that year. The Mopar edition came only in the "Pitch Black" exterior color with a Mopar blue driver side stripe and a Mopar grille badge instead of an "R/T" badge. The interior is finished in the same black as seen on the outside except for a splash of chrome and carbon fiber dash and center console, along with a pistol grip shifter. The Mopar blue stripe is carried to the interior as a part of the driver's front seat and the left side rear passenger seat. The performance of the Mopar edition Charger is improved with the Super Track Pack, a 3.91 final drive gear ratio, a three-mode traction control, heavy-duty brakes, larger stability bars, front and rear strut tower bars, as well as a sport-tuned steering rack.

=== 2012 ===
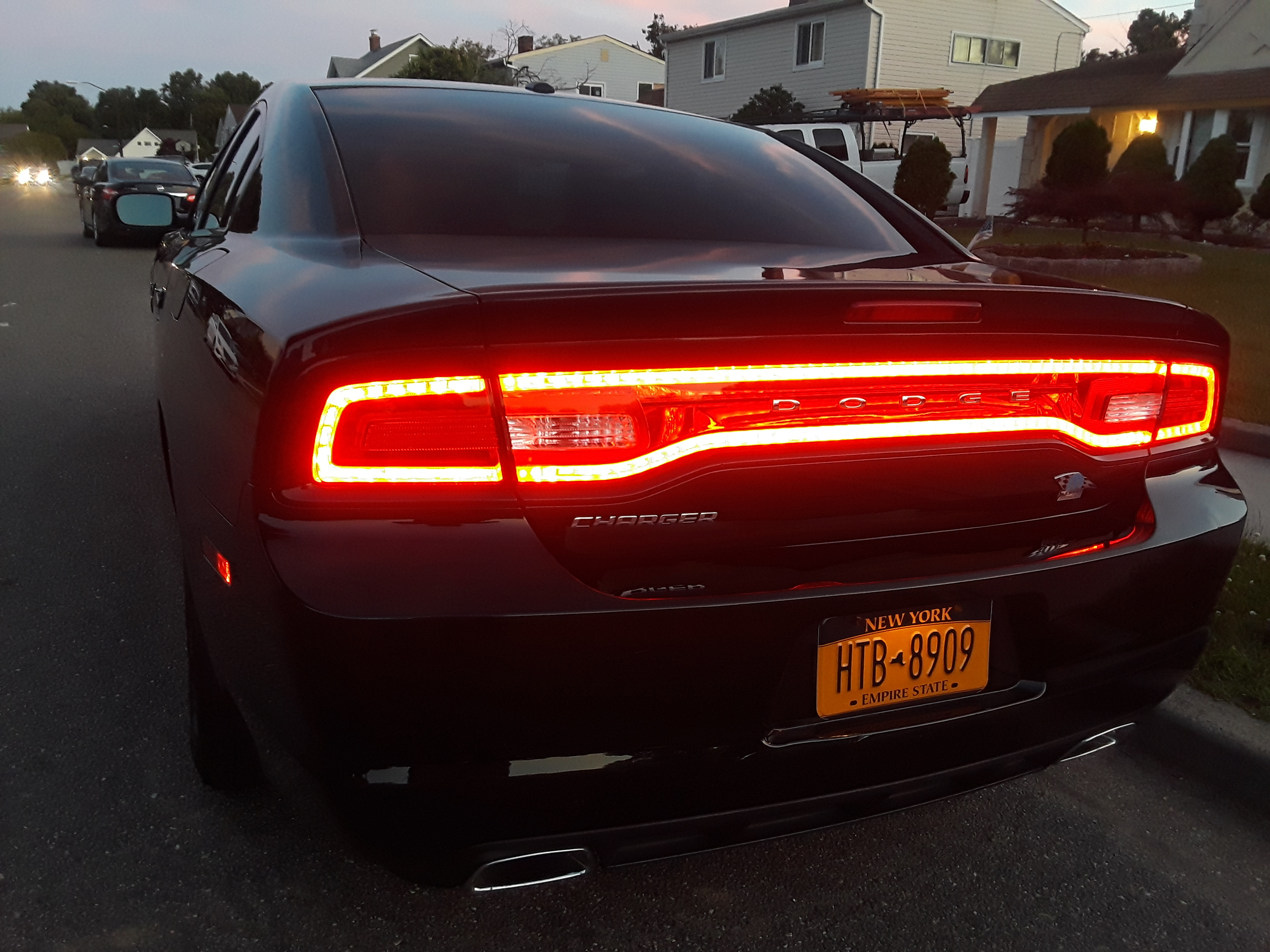
2011–2014 Charger "Race-track" design taillights illuminated

From the 2012 model year, the 3.6 L engine was available with an 8-speed automatic that improved fuel economy by 4-mpg on the highway.

The 3.6 liter Pentastar V6 is rated at 292 hp (218 kW) and 260 lb⋅ft (353 N⋅m) of torque, the 5.7 L V8 has 370 hp (276 kW) and 395 lb⋅ft (536 N⋅m) of torque, and the new 6.4 liter V8 is rated at 470 hp (350 kW) and 470 lb⋅ft (637 N⋅m) of torque. According to the October 2011 issue of Motor Trend, the Dodge Charger SRT8, weighing 4,361 lb (1,978 kg), accelerates from 0-60 mph (97 km/h) in 4.3 seconds, and completes the quarter mile (~400 m) in 12.8 seconds at 110 mph (177 km/h). It is mechanically identical to the Chrysler 300 SRT8.

The Charger SRT8, which was previewed at the 2011 Chicago Auto Show, returned as a 2012 model. Chrysler added the Dodge logo with slanted red rectangles to the grille of the SRT8 halfway through the 2012 model year. The Super Bee returned for 2012 with the 392 Hemi engine in "Stinger Yellow" and "Pitch Black" exterior colors.

=== 2013 ===
==== Dodge Charger Juiced ====
Unveiled at the 2012 SEMA Show, the Dodge Charger Juiced is based on the Dodge Charger, with a Mopar crate Viper V10 engine rated at 650 hp (485 kW; 659 PS), Mopar cold air intake and Mopar cat-back exhaust, Mopar front chin spoiler, Mopar Performance prototype hood (with a functional forward-facing intake), roof in a darker matte version of the custom Metallic "Copperhead" body color, unique Mopar matte black hood graphics and decklid graphics, body-color split crosshair grille with a Mopar grille badge, Mopar-exclusive 20-inch lightweight wheels trimmed in matte black with an accent "Copperhead" stripe, unique black Katzkin leather seats with touches of "Copperhead" color, "Copperhead" color stitching at the steering wheel, shifter and armrest; a "Copperhead" embroidered on the seatbacks, aluminum instrument panel bezel in matte black, Mopar logo door-sill guards, Mopar logo premium carpet floor mats and a Mopar pistol-grip shifter.

==== 2013 Dodge Charger R/T Blacktop ====
Available for the Charger R/T and R/T Plus, it includes a choice of 6 body colors (Pitch Black, Billet Metallic, Granite Crystal, Bright White, Redline Red Tri-coat, and Phantom Black Tri-coat), Gloss Black 20-inch aluminum wheels, Gloss Black center caps, Gloss Black front grille, body-color rear spoiler, steering wheel-mounted paddle shifters, Sport Mode, 3.06 rear axle, Beats Audio (10 speakers with subwoofer and 552-Watt amplifier). The Blacktop Package was also available in model years 2012 and 2013 for the Charger V6 model. Horsepower was increased to 300 through the use of cold air intake and less restrictive exhaust systems.

==== 2013 Dodge Charger Daytona ====
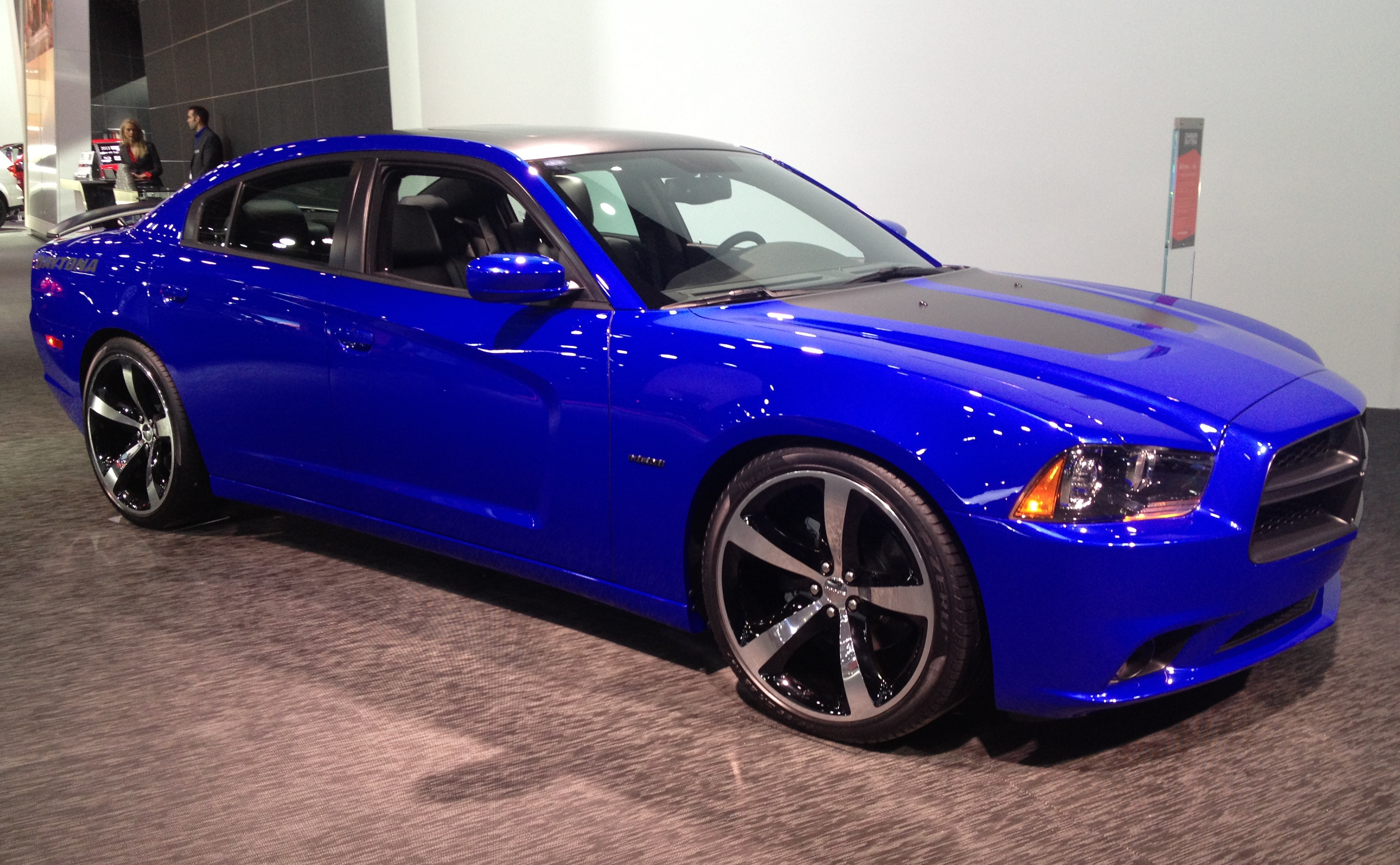
Dodge Charger Daytona show car at the 2013 North American International Auto Show

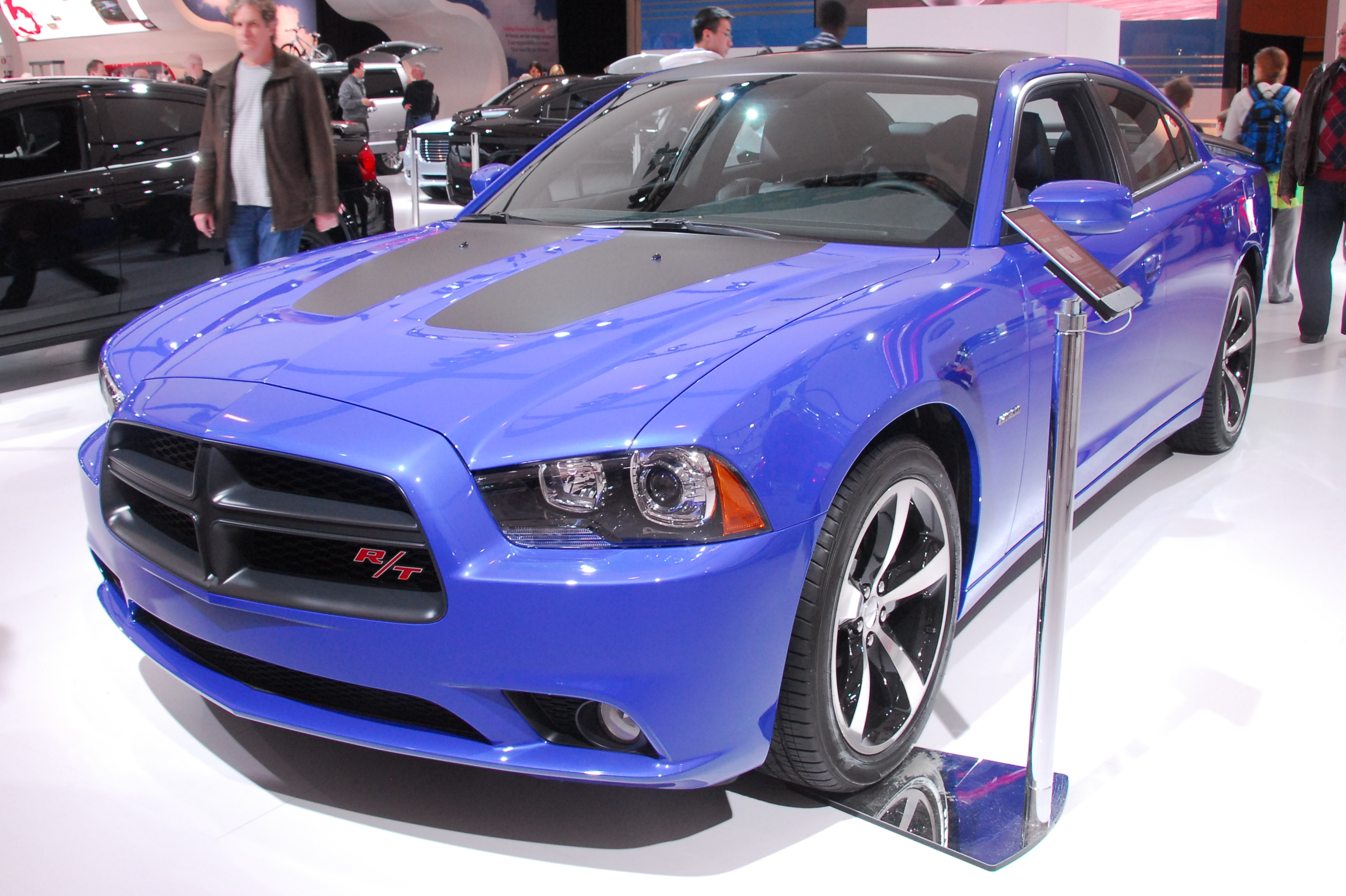
Dodge Charger Daytona at the 2013 Canadian International AutoShow

The Charger Daytona is a limited version of the 2013 Charger R/T and Charger R/T Road & Track with a choice of 4 body colors (Daytona Blue, Bright White, Billet Silver, Pitch Black), dark trim, Satin Black front crosshair grille with heritage "R/T" badge, custom vinyl hood graphic, roof wrap, rear R/T spoiler; "DAYTONA" graphic on the rear quarter panels, exclusive 20-inch five-spoke polished aluminum wheels with Gloss Black painted pockets, 'Daytona Blue' engine cover, performance 3.06 rear axle ratio, high-speed engine controller, paddle shifters with sport mode, performance steering and suspension, black heated and ventilated seats with Daytona Blue stitching and piping in cloth (R/T) or Nappa leather and suede (R/T Road & Track) upholstery, blue "DAYTONA" embroidery at the upper front seat backs, unique dark brushed aluminum trim surrounds the 8.4-inch Uconnect Touch screen and gauges on the instrument panel, as well as the trim around the shifter and cup holders on the center console; a Mopar bright pedal kit, a 552-watt 10-speaker Beats Audio System, a special numbered "DAYTONA" badge on the instrument panel that features the build number of that specific Charger Daytona model.

The SRT Daytona was unveiled at the 2012 Los Angeles International Auto Show. US models arrived at Dodge dealerships nationwide in the first quarter of 2013. Production was limited to 2,500 units.

==== 2013 Dodge Charger AWD Sport ====
Available for Dodge Charger SXT AWD, SXT Plus AWD, Charger R/T AWD, and R/T Plus AWD, the Charger AWD Sport package includes a unique gloss black painted split-crosshair grille and grille surround, 19-inch polished aluminum wheels with Gloss Black pockets, all-season performance tires, steering-wheel-mounted paddle shifters, sport mode transmission calibration, rear body-color spoiler, sport seats in black cloth (SXT and R/T) or premium black or red heated Nappa leather (SXT Plus and R/T Plus) upholstery, Beats Audio technology (a 12-channel amplifier integrating Beats proprietary equalizer algorithm, three 3.5-inch speakers located in the instrument panel, two 3.5-inch speakers located in the rear doors, two 6 x 9-inch front-door woofers, two 6 x 9-inch speakers and a center-mounted 8-inch speaker located in the rear-shelf area), active transfer case and front-axle-disconnect system.

The US model arrived at Dodge dealerships nationwide in the first quarter of 2013.

==== Dodge Charger SRT8 392 Appearance Package ====
Available for the 2013 and 2014 model years, this appearance package is a limited (392 units total) version of Dodge Charger SRT8 with custom-designed gloss black "392 HEMI" fender badges with a charcoal grey metallic insert, center section of power bulge hood painted in Pitch Black, roof painted in Pitch Black, new satin black SRT lower-body side stripe with a heavy band and accent tracer stretching from the front fascia, through doors to rear fascias; side mirrors painted in Pitch Black, 20-inch split five-spoke Black Vapor Chrome wheels, rear spoiler painted in Pitch Black, choice of 5 body colors (Bright White Clear Coat, Billet Silver Metallic Clear Coat, Plum Crazy Pearl Coat, HEMI Orange Pearl Coat, and TorRed Clear Coat), '392' engine beauty covers under the hood, exclusive serialized dash plaque showing production build number / 392, expanded adaptive damping suspension with three-mode selectable suspension tuning, standard launch control.

Orders for the US model began in April 2013.

=== 2014 ===
==== 2014 Dodge Charger, Dodge Charger AWD Sport ====
Changes for 2014 included Uconnect 8.4N with integrated Garmin navigation, 3 new body colors (Header Orange, TorRed, Plum Crazy), and re-introduction of the Blacktop and Rallye Appearance Packages.

The Redline package is based on 2014 Dodge Charger SXT and SXT Plus models, with 20-inch Black Chrome wheels with a Redline Red lip and inner backbone, all-season performance tires, a performance-tuned suspension, sport seats, rear body-color spoiler, exclusive Beats by Dre audio system, eight-speed automatic transmission with steering-wheel-mounted paddle shifters and Sport Mode.

The 20-inch Wheel Sport Appearance Group is based on Charger SXT models, with 20-inch chrome-clad wheels, performance-tuned suspension and all-season tires, and a body-color rear spoiler.

The Dodge Charger AWD Sport includes a unique Gloss Black split-crosshair grille, polished 19-inch aluminum wheels with Gloss Black pockets; steering-wheel-mounted paddle shifters with sport-mode, rear spoiler, sport seats, 300 horsepower V-6 or 370 horsepower V8 engine, Beats Audio.

The US model was set to appear in Dodge showrooms in fall 2013. Early models include SE, SXT, SXT Plus, R/T, R/T Plus, R/T Road & Track, R/T Max.

==== 2014 Dodge Charger Pursuit, Charger Pursuit V-8 AWD ====
The police version of the Dodge Charger was made available with a choice of a 3.6-liter Pentastar V6 (292 hp) or 5.7-liter HEMI V8 (370 hp) engine, larger 14.5-inch front brake discs, increased front-caliper swept area from 289 sq.in to 388 sq.in., increased rear-caliper swept area from 291 sq.in. to 296 sq.in., Police-specific Secure Park (prevents an idling vehicle from being driven without key fob present in the vehicle), revised rear fascia and exhaust tips, new camber link change to the rear suspension to further enhance high-speed and aggressive braking performance, upgraded fuel pump for added durability, variable-displacement air conditioner compressor for added efficiency, factory-installed Mopar horizontal or vertical vinyl graphics for customer convenience and optional ParkSense rear-park assist.

The Charger Pursuit V-8 AWD model includes segment-exclusive active transfer case and front-axle disconnect (late availability). The Dodge Charger Pursuit AWD became available to law enforcement customers in December of 2014 through Chrysler Group's Fleet Operations.

The 2014 Dodge Charger Pursuit AWD recorded the fastest lap time during Michigan State Police's 2014 Vehicle Evaluation Test (1:33.85), and fastest average lap time (1:34.75) at the Grattan Raceway.

==== 2014 Dodge Charger Scat Packages, 2013 SEMA concept ====
Unveiled at the 2013 SEMA Show, the Scat Package 1 includes a Mopar cold air intake, Mopar cat-back exhaust, Scat Package 1 badge, and an all-new performance calibrated engine controller "optimized" to the 5.7-liter HEMI engine.

The Scat Package 2 adds a customized, optimized performance calibration feature tailored for Scat Package 2, a new Mopar performance camshaft that works in conjunction with the components of the Scat Package 1 kit, and a 'Scat Package 2' badge.

The Scat Package 3 adds optimized performance calibration tailored for Scat Package 3, new Mopar performance CNC ported and polished cylinder heads, Mopar performance camshaft, Mopar hi-flow performance headers, and a Scat Package 3 badge.

The SEMA concept car includes 20 x 9-inch unique lightweight wheels with black Mopar center caps and a Hyperblack II finish, a side valence, a unique new front splitter and Redline rear spoiler, a Scat Pack hard badge in the rear quarter window, Katzkin black performance leather seats, black leather door panel inserts featuring red leather Dodge stripes and red accent stitching, red seat-belt webbing, red carpet bindings, red embroidered Dodge Charger logo in the front seats, gloss-black steering-wheel spokes, black chrome on the door handles, cluster rings, instrument panel bezels, center console trim, and steering-wheel center ring; added bright pedal kit, pistol-grip shifter, door-sill guards, and a wireless charging pad.

==== Dodge Charger 100th Anniversary Edition ====
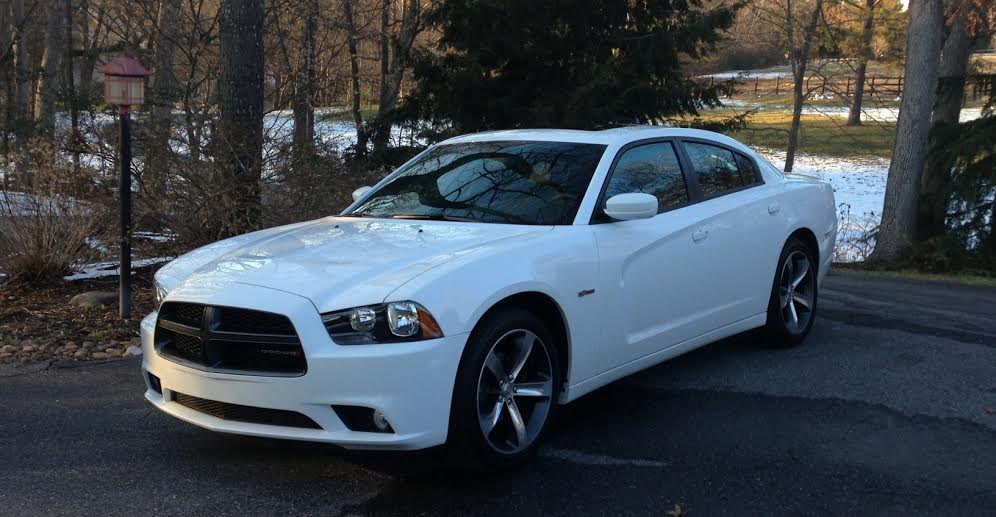
2014 Dodge Charger SXT Plus - 100th Anniversary Edition

The 100th Anniversary Edition is a version of the 2014 Dodge Charger SXT Plus with the Pentastar V6 engine or R/T Plus with HEMI V-8 engine, commemorating the 100th anniversary of brothers Horace Elgin Dodge and John Francis Dodge introducing the Dodge Model 30, with choice of 8 body colors (Pitch Black, Bright White, Billet Silver, Granite Crystal, Ivory Tri-Coat, Phantom Black Tri-Coat, Header Orange and an exclusive High Octane Red pearl), 20x8-inch polished five-spoke aluminum wheels, Granite Crystal pockets and a matching Granite Crystal Dodge split-crosshair grille, "Dodge Est. 1914" bar-style front-fender badges, Dodge "100" logo on the center caps, a body-color rear spoiler, a red "R/T" heritage grille badge on R/T Plus model, sport seats with all-new Molten Red or Foundry Black Nappa leather upholstery, a custom cloud overprint at sport seats, center console armrest and door armrests; a unique three-spoke flat-bottom performance steering wheel with die-cast paddle shifters, brass-colored accent stitching on leather-wrapped surfaces, Dark Brushed Graphite center console bezels, Liquid Graphite steering-wheel accents, die-cast "Dodge Est. 1914" circular badges on front seatbacks, an embroidered anniversary logo on floor mats, all-new instrument panel cluster graphics (unique black-face gauges with white indication, stand-out red "100" mph indication), Electronic Vehicle Information Center and a Uconnect 8.4-inch touchscreen with unique startup image, Uconnect 8.4-inch touchscreen with Beats by Dr. Dre audio technology (10-speakers and a 12-channel 552 watt amplifier that integrates Beats proprietary equalizer algorithm), eight-speed automatic transmission with sport mode (SXT Plus), sport mode calibration, performance-tuned suspension, two unique key fobs with 100th Anniversary Edition jeweled logo on the back side, a customized owner's kit, a special commemorative book celebrating the 100 years of Dodge heritage.

The 100th Anniversary Edition was unveiled in the 2013 LA Auto Show. The US and Canadian model was set to appear in Dodge showrooms during the first quarter of 2014.

=== 2015 facelift ===
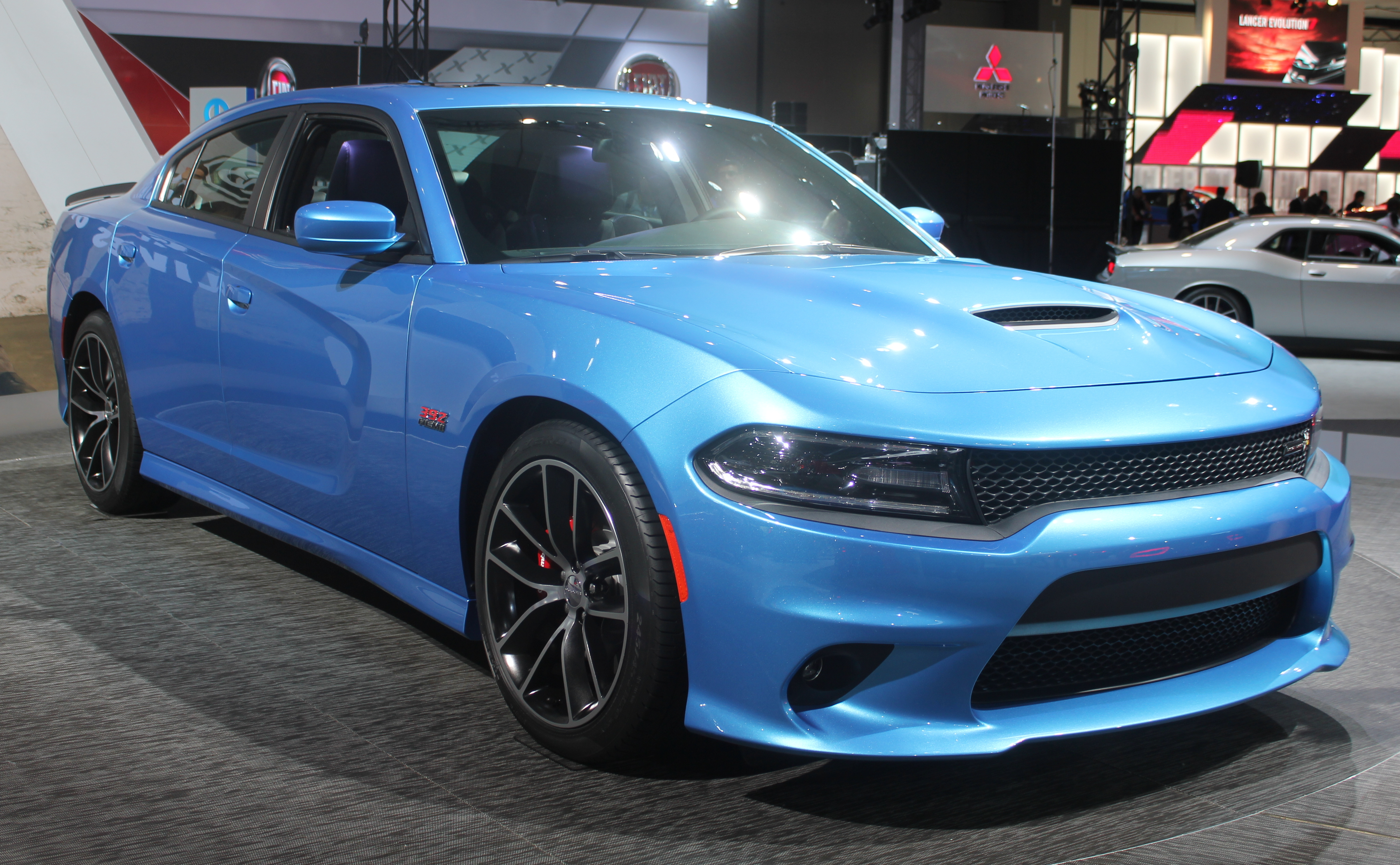
2015 facelift, front 3/4

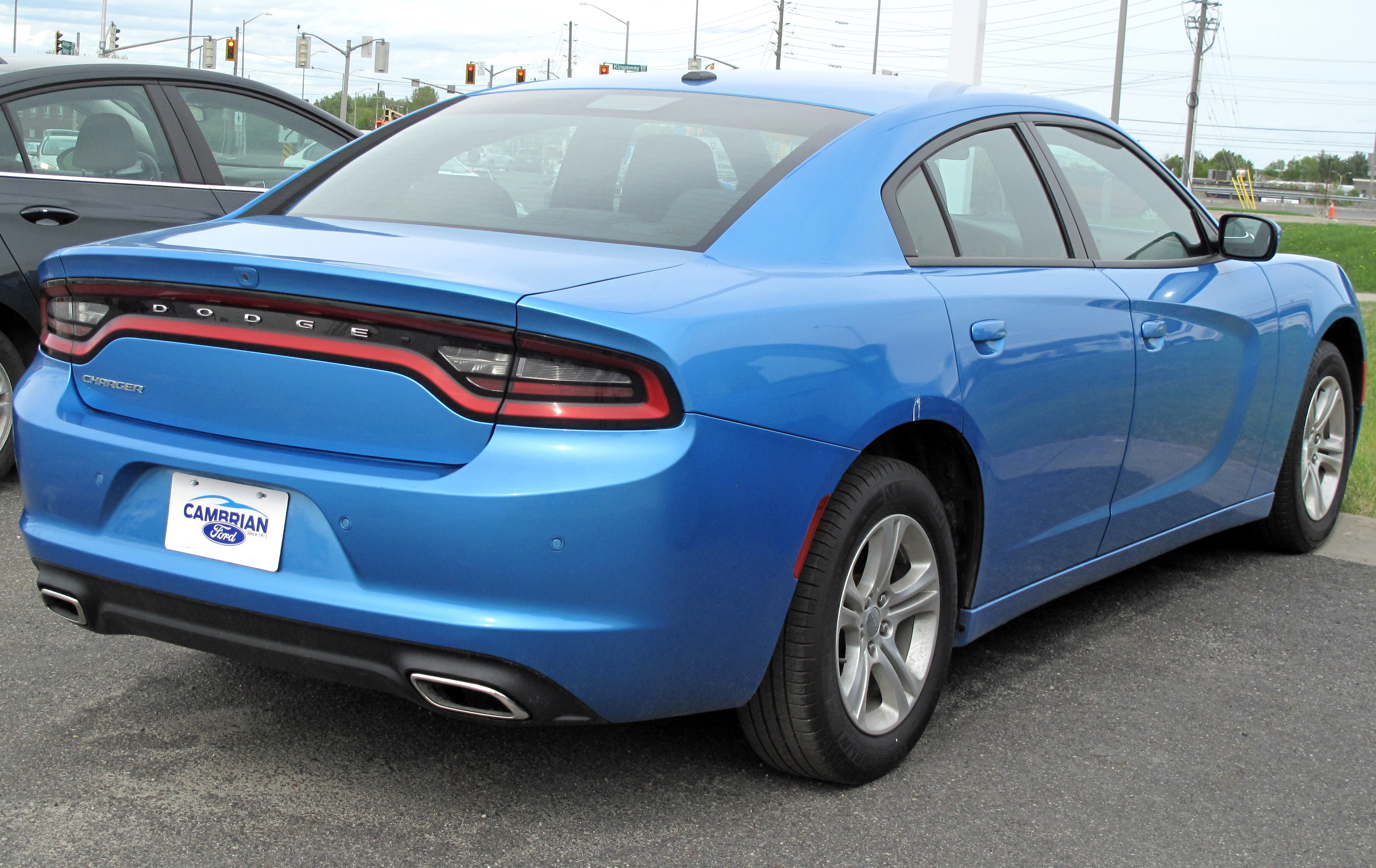
Rear

Unveiled at the 2014 New York International Auto Show, the 2015 Dodge Charger received a substantial makeover, the most noticeable change coming in the new front grille and rounded LED headlights. Retaining its Coke bottle styling Dodge claims to have reworked just about every panel on the car; made to look "leaner and more athletic" than its previous look while keeping the same dimensions. Dodge is reported to have used the 1969 Charger as its inspiration for the remodeling.

The engines include the 370 hp (276 kW) 5.7 L Hemi V8 and the 292 hp (218 kW) 3.6 liter V6. The V6 model is EPA-rated at 31 mpg or 7.6L/100 km which is claimed by the manufacturer to be the best in its class. Except for the Police Pursuit version (which retains the 5-speed automatic), the only available transmission is the Chrysler eight-speed automatic, coupled with optional all-wheel drive. The all-wheel-drive system automatically removes power to the front axle when not required, giving an improvement in fuel economy. The new electronic gearshift with optional paddle shifters gives shift times of as little as 0.25 seconds in the sport mode.

The reworked interior includes new materials for the door, console, and dash panels, a new steering wheel and seats, and a wide range of trim packages with both leather and cloth seating. The refreshed interior also features a new instrument cluster featuring a 7-inch (180mm) TFT (Thin Film Transistor) display. The available 8.4-inch Uconnect touchscreen radio with available navigation has been revised, now including Uconnect Apps. Mechanically, the 3.6L Pentastar V6 and the 5.7L/6.4L HEMI engines remained the same. All engines are now backed by the ZF 8HP 8-Speed Automatic transmissions co-produced by ZF (previously only V6 models used the ZF 8-speed). There have been revisions to the chassis components, including Electric-Assist power steering, which replaces the previous models Electro-Hydraulic Assist power steering. New aluminum rear differentials now use 4-mounting bolts for rigidity. AWD is no longer available on 5.7L R/T models.

The 2015 Dodge Charger went on sale starting December 2014 in the US and Canada.

==== Charger SRT Hellcat ====
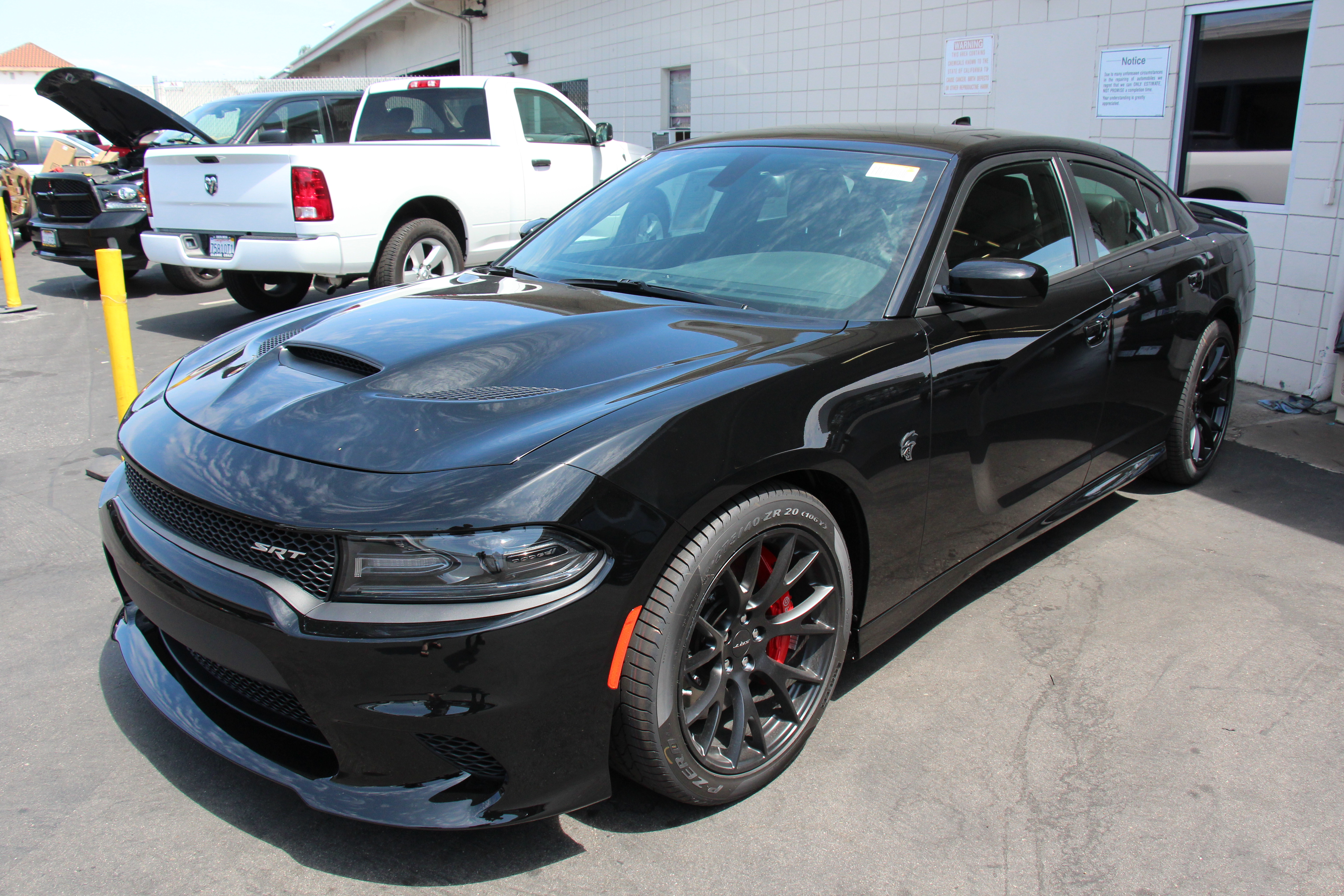
Dodge Charger SRT Hellcat

The 2015 Dodge Charger SRT Hellcat was introduced on August 13, 2014, prior to being shown at the Woodward Dream Cruise and was unveiled at the 2014 South Florida International Auto Show in November.

It includes the same 707 hp (527 kW; 717 PS), 650 lb⋅ft (881 N⋅m), 6.2-liter supercharged Hemi V8 present in the Dodge Challenger SRT Hellcat. The Charger Hellcat features a redesigned front fascia with a larger lower grille similar to the third generation Dodge Viper.

Dodge claimed the Hellcat to be the fastest factory four-door sedan ever to be built when it was released.

===== Performance =====
Test results for a stock Hellcat Charger from 2014 and 2015
- Top speed: 206.90 mph (333 km/h) at tailwind and 202.20 mph (325 km/h) at headwind for a two-way average of 204.55 mph (329 km/h); capable of up to 217.55 mph (350 km/h)
- 0–30 mph (48 km/h): 1.6 seconds
- 0–31.1 mph (50 km/h): 1.9 seconds
- 0–40 mph (64 km/h): 2.2 seconds; 2.61 seconds
- 0–50 mph (80 km/h): 2.8 seconds
- 0–60 mph (97 km/h): 3.4 seconds; 3.78 seconds
- 0–62.1 mph (100 km/h): 3.5 seconds; 3.9 seconds
- 0–70 mph (113 km/h): 4.3 seconds
- 0–80 mph (129 km/h): 5.1 seconds; 4.99 seconds; 5.5 seconds
- 0–90 mph (145 km/h): 6.1 seconds
- 0–100 mph (161 km/h): 7.2 seconds; 6.33 seconds; 7.4 seconds
- 0–110 mph (177 km/h): 8.4 seconds
- 0–120 mph (193 km/h): 9.9 seconds
- 0–124.3 mph (200 km/h): 10.7 seconds; 10.9 seconds
- 0–130 mph (209 km/h): 11.7 seconds
- 0–140 mph (225 km/h): 13.7 seconds
- 0–150 mph (241 km/h): 15.8 seconds; 12.56 seconds
- 0–155.3 mph (250 km/h): 17.6 seconds
- 0–160 mph (257 km/h): 19.2 seconds
- 0–170 mph (274 km/h): 23.1 seconds
- 0–174.0 mph (280 km/h): 25.5 seconds
- 0–200 mph (322 km/h): 27.67 seconds
- 0–1/8 mile: 7.5 seconds
- 0–1/4 mile: 11.03 seconds at 126.61 mph (204 km/h); 11.3 seconds; 11.85 seconds
- 0–1 kilometer: 19.8 seconds
- Skidpad, 300 ft (91.4 m): 0.94 g
Test results from 2016 in Road & Track's six-car 0-to-200-mph comparison test
- 0–10 mph (16 km/h): 0.8 seconds
- 0–20 mph (32 km/h): 1.6 seconds
- 0–30 mph (48 km/h): 2.1 seconds
- 0–40 mph (64 km/h): 3.8 seconds
- 0–50 mph (80 km/h): 4.3 seconds
- 0–60 mph (97 km/h): 4.9 seconds
- 0–62.1 mph (100 km/h): 5.0 seconds
- 0–70 mph (113 km/h): 5.2 seconds
- 0–80 mph (129 km/h): 6.2 seconds
- 0–90 mph (145 km/h): 6.7 seconds
- 0–100 mph (161 km/h): 7.3 seconds
- 0–110 mph (177 km/h): 8.6 seconds
- 0–120 mph (193 km/h): 10.0 seconds
- 0–124.3 mph (200 km/h): 10.4 seconds
- 0–130 mph (209 km/h): 11.0 seconds
- 0–140 mph (225 km/h): 12.4 seconds
- 0–150 mph (241 km/h): 14.1 seconds
- 0–155.3 mph (250 km/h): 15.4 seconds
- 0–160 mph (257 km/h): 16.5 seconds
- 0–170 mph (274 km/h): 20.0 seconds
- 0–180 mph (290 km/h): 25.5 seconds
- 0–186.4 mph (300 km/h): 29.3 seconds
- 0–190 mph (306 km/h): 31.4 seconds
- 0–200 mph (322 km/h): 37.0 seconds
- 0–1/4 mile: 12.0 seconds at 137.0 mph (220 km/h)
- Skidpad: 0.96 g
  - The Charger Hellcat's 2.4-second and 3.7-second pass from 60–100 mph (97–161 km/h) and 100–130 mph (161–209 km/h) makes it faster than the other cars in the 0–200 mph battle, including the Lamborghini Aventador SuperVeloce LP750–4 which completes the 60–100 and 100–130 passes in 2.6 and 4.0 seconds respectively, and the McLaren 675LT which does 60–100 in 2.8 and 100–130 in 3.9 seconds. Combining into 60–130 is the Hellcat doing 6.1 seconds to the Aventador's 6.6 and the 675LT's 6.7 seconds.

==== Charger SRT 392 ====
The SRT 392 Hemi is equipped with a 6.4 liter V8 rated at 485 hp (362 kW; 492 PS) and 475 lb⋅ft (644 N⋅m) of torque. The Charger SRT 392 also comes with 20-inch forged aluminum wheels, 15.4-inch brake rotors out front, and 13.8-inch rear brake rotors.

==== Charger R/T Scat Pack ====
The Charger R/T Scat Pack essentially takes the place of the former SRT8 Super Bee in the Charger lineup. The powertrain of the SRT 392 is present, as are the front and rear bumpers, but leather upholstery is optional (as opposed to standard), the suspension uses fixed-rate Bilstein shocks, the brakes are slightly smaller, and the wheel and tire package is narrower. The Scat pack shares its exterior look with the Charger Hellcat and features a narrow grille, a hood scoop, tinted headlamps, and 20-inch forged wheels.

=== 2020 ===
==== Charger Widebody ====
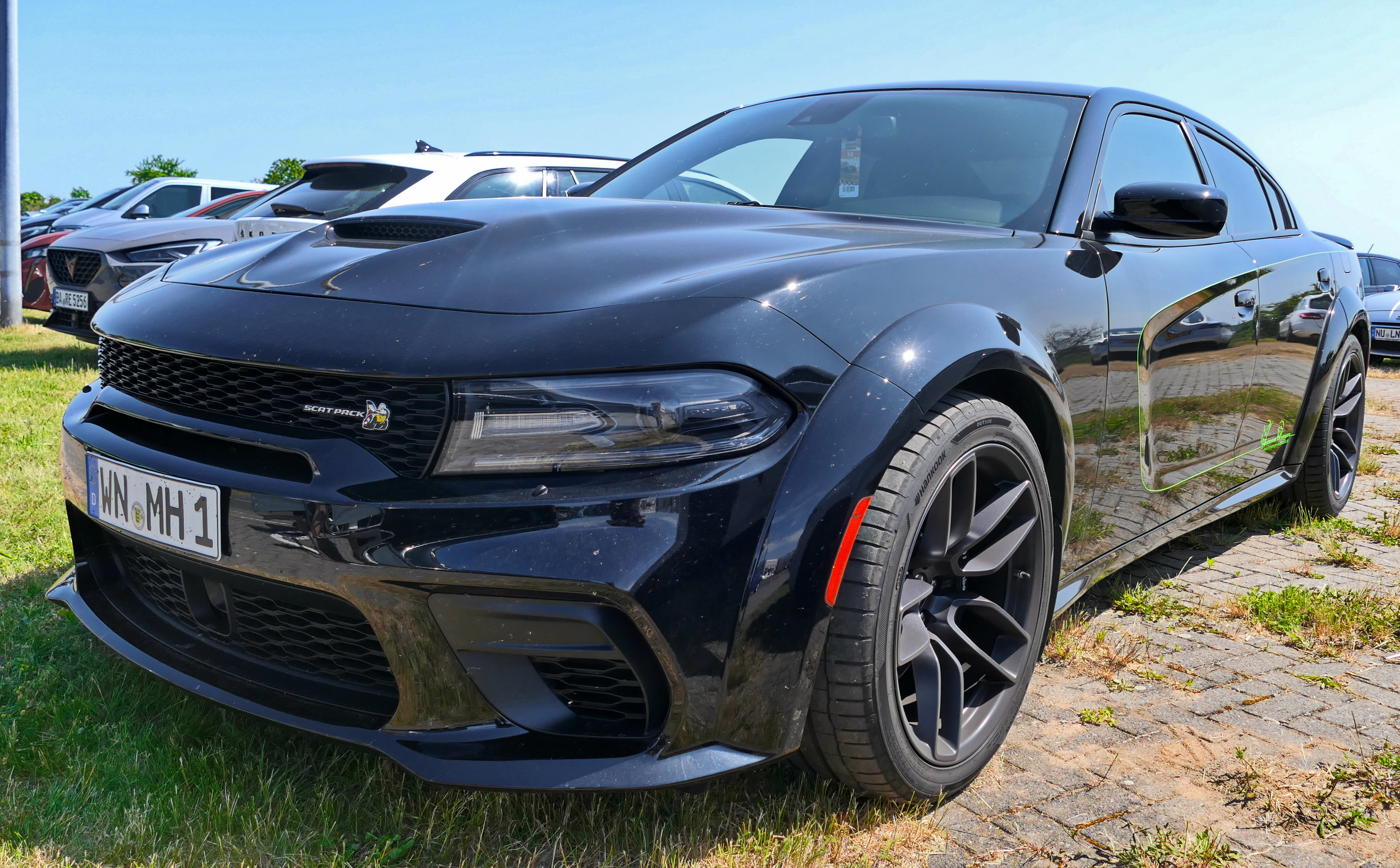
Dodge Charger Scat Pack Widebody

For 2020, a "Widebody Package" was made available for the Charger R/T Scat Pack as an option, but replacing the narrow-body Charger Hellcat. The package mirrors that of the Challenger Widebody. The following are included:

- Widebody fender flares
- 20x11-inch Devils Rim forged aluminum wheels
- 305/35ZR20 Pirelli 3-season performance tires
- 3-mode Bilstein adaptive damping suspension uniquely tuned for competition use
- 6-piston calipers with 15.4-inch vented and slotted rotors in the front (standard on Hellcat models)
- Stiffened anti-roll bars sized 34mm in front and 22mm rear (standard on Hellcat models)
- New electrically assisted steering system
- Features from the Challenger Demon including race cool down (Hellcat only), line lock and launch control/launch assist

=== 2021 ===
==== Charger Pursuit ====
Chrysler had ceased manufacturing the W5A580 transmission at Kokomo-2 in August of 2018, but continued to install them in new Charger squads while there was still new inventory. In 2020, there was no V8-RWD Pursuit, just the V6-RWD and V8-AWD models. Production of the Pursuit was then paused when the W5A580 transmission inventory was used up.

When production resumed in late 2021, the two Pursuit models reversed roles: the V6 now had AWD and also got the Durango's 850RE 8-speed automatic. The V8-AWD model was dropped, but the V8-RWD reappeared, this time with the 8HP70. They kept these two models going through 2023. While the V6 was not as quick, it was very successful, as it offered far lower operating costs than the V8 cars - which have always required higher levels of maintenance and repair.

The only other change of significance was the top speed of both cars electronically limited to 140 mph (down from 152 mph in the previous V8 cars), with the ability of a department to have the limit adjusted, downward only, at a dealer.

==== Charger SRT Hellcat Redeye ====
A heavily upgraded version of the Hellcat was introduced as the Hellcat Redeye for 2021. Like the Challenger Redeye, it is equipped with a supercharged 6.2L V8 rated at 797 hp (594 kW; 808 PS) and 707 lb⋅ft (959 N⋅m) of torque, an increase of 90 hp (67 kW) and 57 lb⋅ft (77 N⋅m) over the standard Hellcat motor. Other upgrades include a reinforced ZF 8-speed automatic transmission, track-tuned suspension, torque reserve and 41-spline heavy-duty half-shafts, SRT power chiller, and after-run chiller.

=== 2022 ===
For 2022, Dodge introduced the Jailbreak package for the SRT Hellcat Redeye Widebody, which allows customers to ignore traditional ordering restrictions and choose any combination of colors and trim finishes.

=== 2023 ===
For 2023, the Jailbreak package became available on all SRT Charger models.

=== Marketing ===
As part of the 2014 Dodge Charger launch in the US, Dodge Chargers appeared as hero vehicles driven by the main character Nolan (Grant Bowler) in a 2013 episode of US television series Defiance. The co-branded TV commercial, titled 'Dodge Charger | Defiance' debuted on May 20, 2013. The 30-second commercial shows the endurance of the Charger as it survives obstacles in a changing world, ending with a transformed planet Earth in the year 2046 where 'only the defiant survive.' In addition, the Dodge Defiance Arkfall Sweepstakes featured fans of Dodge and Defiance competing against each other, vying for the grand prize of a trip for two to the world's largest pop culture event taking place in California in summer 2013. Weekly prizes were awarded, including gaming systems, the "Defiance" video game, and Dodge brand merchandise.

=== Safety ===
The 2022 Charger was tested by the Insurance Institute for Highway Safety (IIHS):

IIHS Dodge Charger scores:
Category	Rating	
Small overlap frontal offset (Driver)	Marginal	
Moderate overlap frontal offset	Good	
Side impact (original test)	Good	
Roof strength	Good	
Head restraints and seats	Good	
Headlights	Poor	
Front crash prevention (Vehicle-to-Vehicle)	Superior	optional
Child seat anchors (LATCH) ease of use	Marginal	

=== Recalls ===
9,688 2011 and 2012 Dodge Charger police vehicles were recalled for overheated lighting harness connector causing low beams to fail, and an overheated power distribution center could result in a loss of the vehicle's anti-lock braking and stability control systems.

On May 7, 2012, a recall announcement was made by the National Highway Traffic Safety Administration (NHTSA) regarding loss of anti-lock brakes and stability control as a result of an overheated fuse in the PDC. This failure could lead to loss of vehicle control, which increases crash risk. Over 127,350 Chrysler 300s and Dodge Chargers were recalled.

In March 2024, Stellantis issued a voluntary recall on Dodge Charger and Chrysler 300 cars, between model years 2018 to 2021, the recall affected more than 284,000 cars. The recall relates to the side curtain airbag inflators, that some of the modules could rupture and send shrapnel pieces into the vehicle, injuring the occupants.

== Police Package/Pursuit ==
The Dodge Charger Pursuit, originally called the Dodge Charger Police Package until 2010, is the police car variant of the Dodge Charger. The vehicle, alongside the Dodge Durango Pursuit, was intended to compete with the Ford Police Interceptor and the Chevrolet 9C1. It was introduced alongside the sixth generation Charger at the 2005 New York International Auto Show, entered production alongside the civilian model the following year, and was in production until 2024. Its design is mostly shared with the civilian Charger.

The Charger Pursuit is primarily marketed to and used by law enforcement agencies in the United States, Canada, and Mexico. Some agencies outside North America have also purchased the Charger, including those in Chile, the Czech Republic, Bahrain, Kuwait, Lebanon, Saudi Arabia, and the United Arab Emirates.

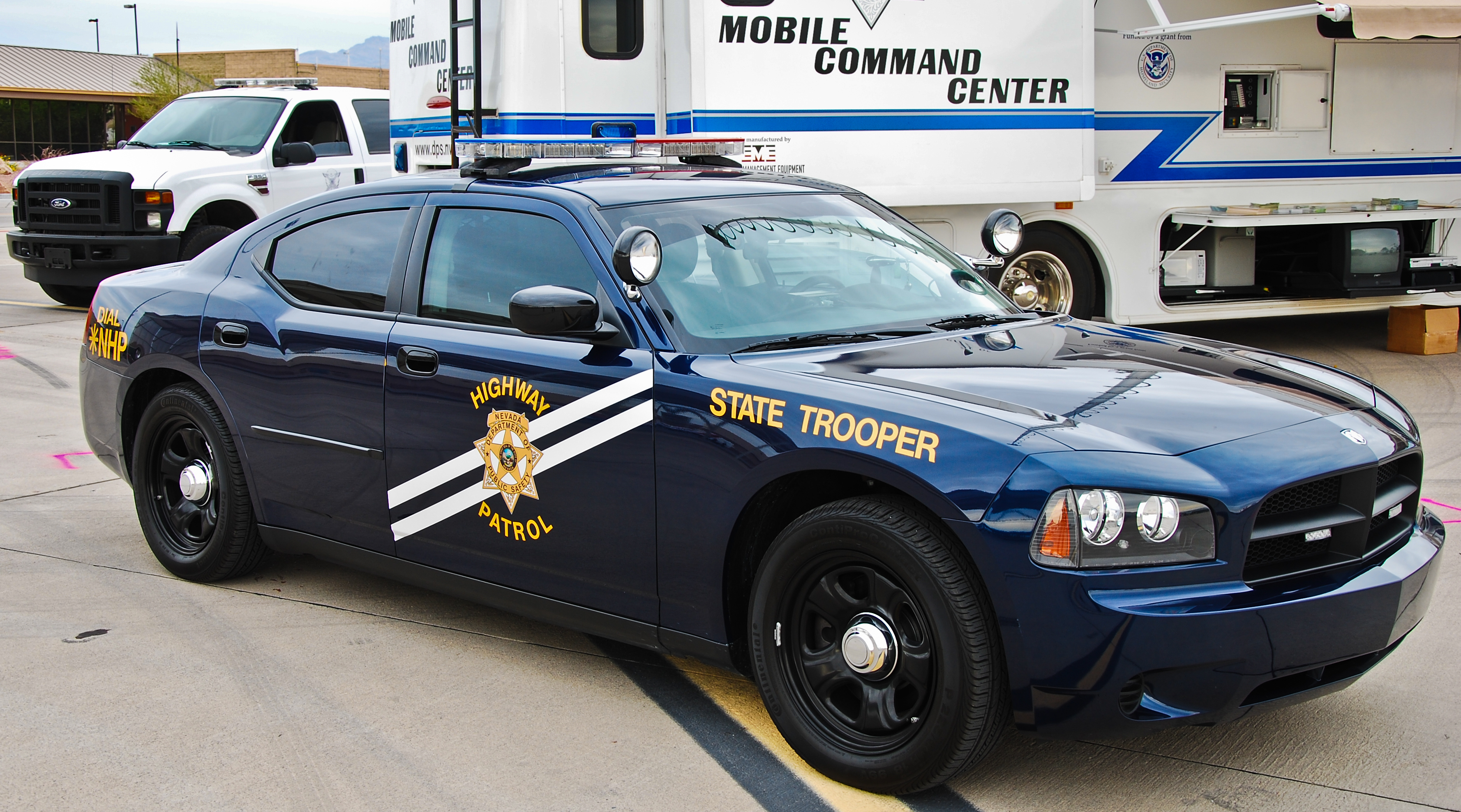
A sixth generation Dodge Charger Police Package used by the Nevada Highway Patrol

The Charger Police Package was released in early 2006. Unlike the civilian Charger, the Charger Police Package features upgraded heavy-duty brakes, a severe-duty cooling system, police performance electronic stability control, police performance-tuned steering, and a gear shifter that is mounted on the steering column instead of in the center console. The Charger Police Package's 370 hp (276 kW) Hemi V8 can accelerate the car from 0 to 60 mph (97 km/h) in 6.0 seconds and to a top speed of 152 mph (245 km/h). In Michigan State Police testing, the Charger V8 outperformed all other pursuit vehicles in acceleration, cornering, and braking (except the Dodge Magnum and V6 Charger, which stopped slightly faster in some tests) in the first five years since its introduction. For 2009, the base Charger Police Package came with the 3.5L V6 and a 5-speed automatic transmission. The rear was slightly updated, moving the "CHARGER" badge to the right, and replacing the left with the badge reading "DODGE". The V8 version uses HEMI V8 engine shared with the Charger Daytona R/T, rated at 370 hp (276 kW) and 395 lb⋅ft (536 N⋅m) of torque.

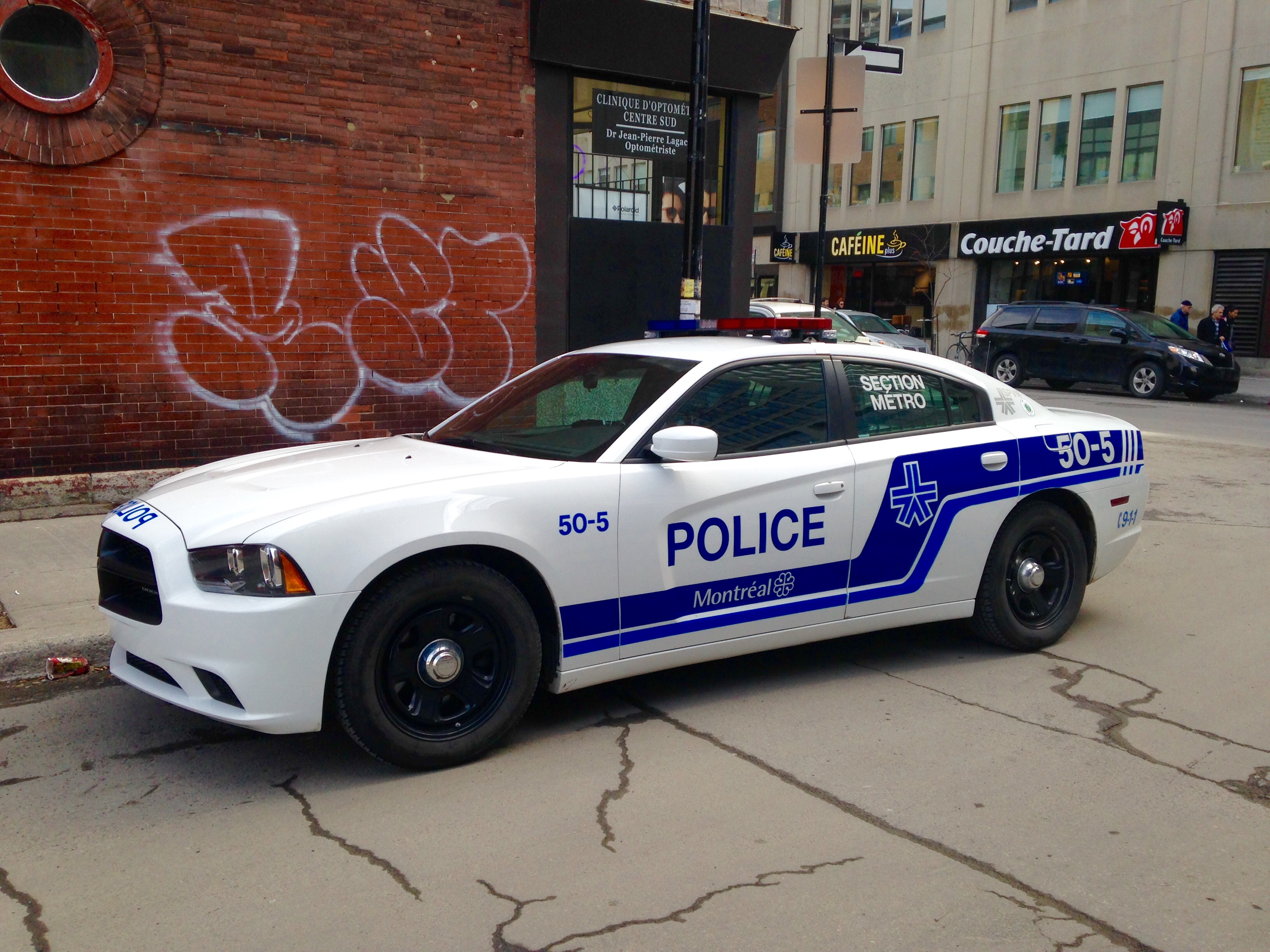
A seventh generation pre-facelift Dodge Charger Pursuit used by the Service de police de la Ville de Montréal

When the Charger was redesigned for the 2011 model year, the police package version was renamed the "Dodge Charger Pursuit". In 2012, the Charger Pursuit replaced the Ford Crown Victoria Police Interceptor as the top police sedan in North America following its discontinuation. Through mid-2014, there was a 3.6 RWD model, and a V8-RWD model. In mid-2014, A V8-AWD model became optional, along with a BR9 brake package.

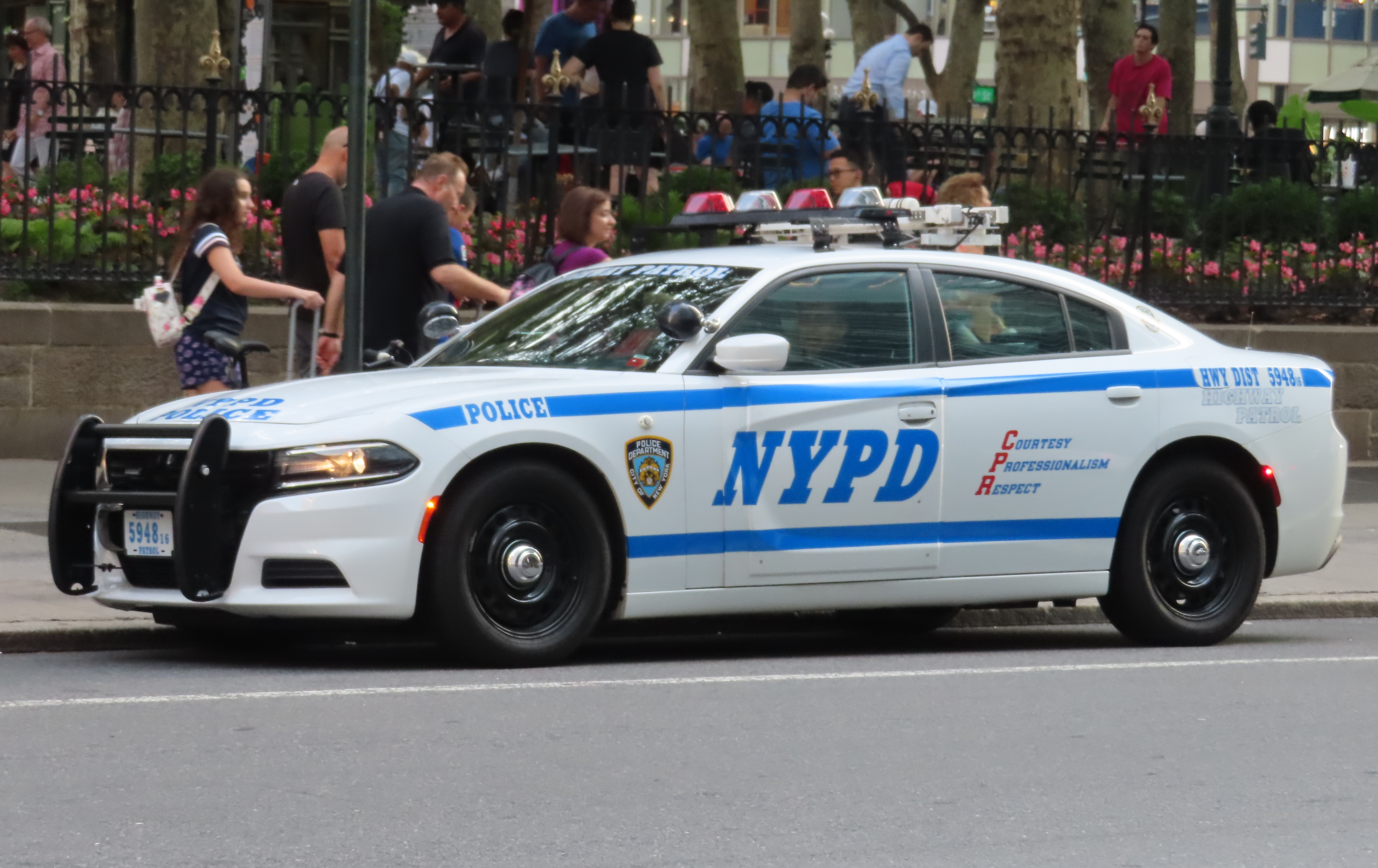
A seventh generation post-facelift Dodge Charger Pursuit used by the New York City Police Department Highway Patrol

For the 2015 model year, the Charger Pursuit received a facelift like its civilian version. By 2017, the Charger Pursuit and competing Ford Police Interceptor Utility essentially shared the sales award, as sales of the AWD Charger rapidly increased. In 2020, in part because of limited A580 transmission availability, the entire factory allotment of Charger Pursuits sold out in only a few months' time. Only two models were available in 2020, the RWD 3.6L and the V8-AWD model.

After a break from production due to the COVID-19 pandemic, the Charger Pursuit resumed production in late 2020 for the 2021 model year with two models: a new V6-AWD (850RE transmission), and a V8-RWD (8HP70). Besides the adaptation of the 8-speed autos, new Charger Pursuit models instituted electronically limited top speeds of 140 mph on both models, down about a dozen on the V8 cars. Purchasing agencies also received the ability to configure the electronic speed limiters downward from 140 mph to a speed of their choosing.

Stellantis will continue to produce the LD Charger, LD Chrysler 300, and LA Challenger through 2023 at Brampton Assembly. All-new replacements for the Charger Pursuit are expected to be unveiled in 2024. These replacement cars are expected to have new powerplants, including hybrid models and electrics.

== Motorsports ==
=== NASCAR ===
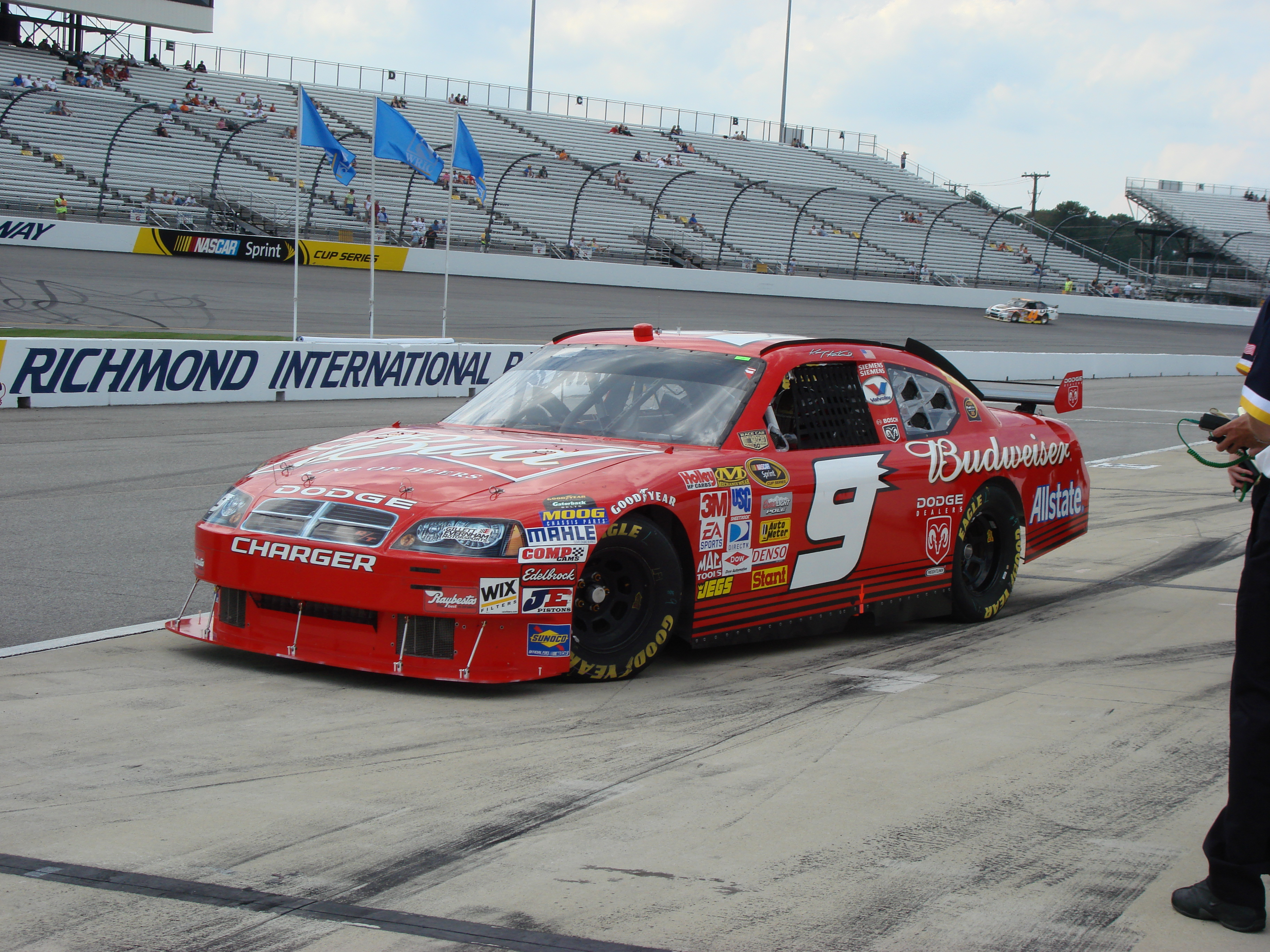
NASCAR Sprint Cup's Dodge Charger Car of Tomorrow, driven by Kasey Kahne

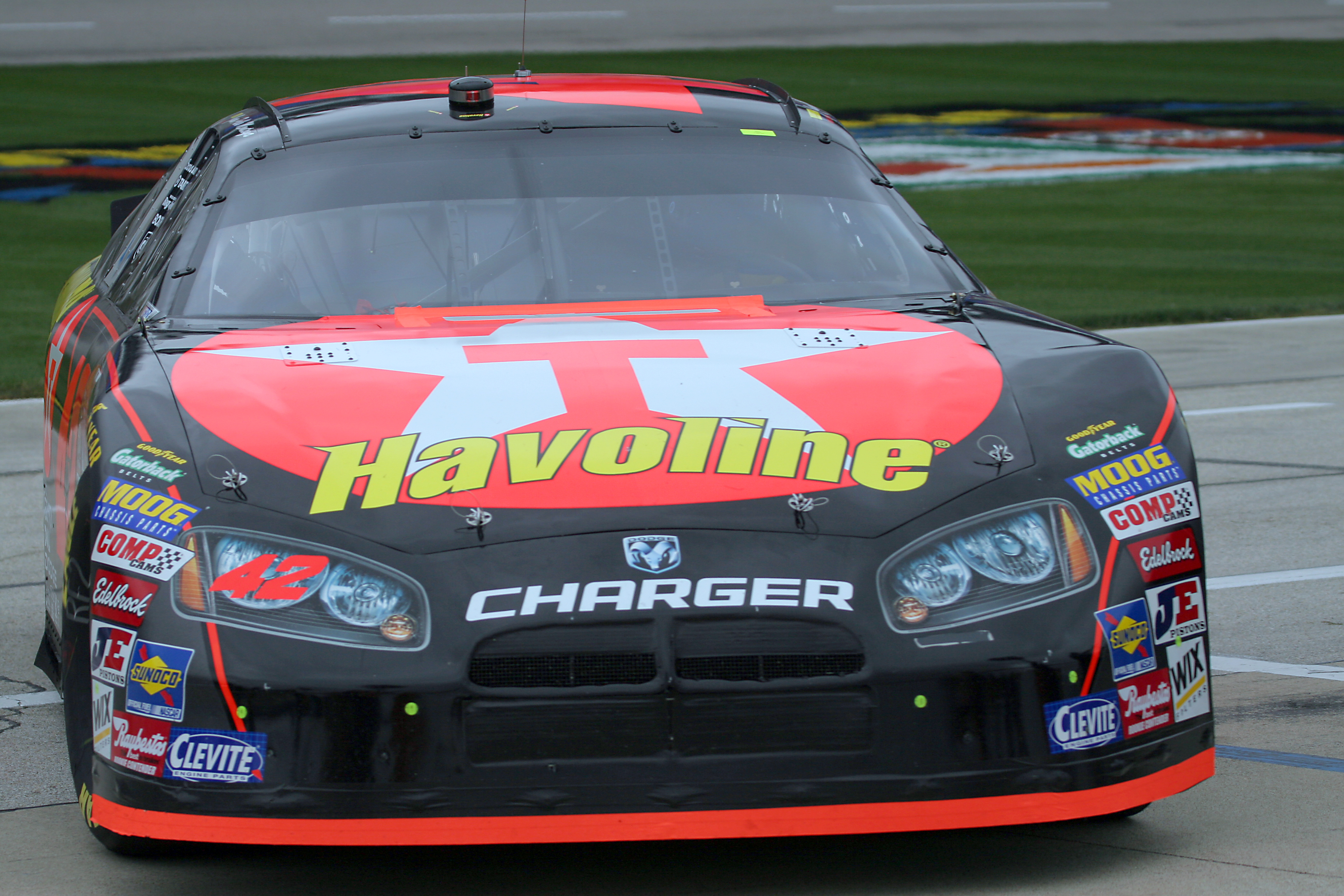
Juan Pablo Montoya's Dodge Charger NASCAR driving into the garage area at Texas Motor Speedway

Racecars based on the Charger were campaigned by several NASCAR Sprint Cup teams starting in 2005 through to 2012. Although NASCAR stock cars bear only a slight resemblance to actual street cars, Dodge's 2005 and 2006 NASCAR entries were based on the Charger silhouette, replacing the previous Dodge Intrepid. Unlike the Intrepid, the Charger shares the rear-wheel-drive with the V8 engine configuration with its NASCAR counterparts.

During the 2007 NASCAR season, the Charger was used in all non Car of Tomorrow races while the Dodge Avenger was used in all Car of Tomorrow races. The Car of Tomorrow was used exclusively in 2008. However, the Avenger Car of Tomorrow was redesignated as a Charger R/T through the use of different decals. The decals have been revised again for 2011–2012 to reflect the updated nose and tail styling of the production Charger, including the full-width taillight panel.

Though the car was successful in Sprint Cup competition, fewer teams were running Dodges from 2007 and on. This would lead Dodge and Ram to abandon its NASCAR (Sprint, Nationwide, and Camping World Truck-series) factory support efforts at the end of the 2012 season. For the 2012 NASCAR season, Penske Racing was the only full-time team campaigning Dodges (the #2 and #22 Chargers) in the Sprint Cup, and their #2 Miller Lite Dodge (driven by Brad Keselowski) won the NASCAR Sprint Cup Championship. Despite winning the Sprint Cup and producing the new 2013 version of the NASCAR Charger, Penske Racing switched to Ford for the 2013 season, ending Dodge's second tenure in the NASCAR Sprint Cup Series.

Penske Racing built two Sprint Cup Series race cars based on the appearance of 2013 Dodge Charger, and the cars were unveiled at the Las Vegas Motor Speedway. About the time the car was unveiled, Penske Racing, the sole Dodge team in Sprint Cup announced it was switching to Ford for the 2013 season. Although the new cars received positive reviews by the automotive press and in track testing, attempts by Dodge Motorsports to get other teams to switch to the new Charger for 2013 came to naught, and Dodge folded its NASCAR racing efforts in all series except the NASCAR Pinty's Series, which is dominated by Dodge cars.

== Production ==
The Dodge Charger is assembled at the Brampton Assembly in Brampton, Ontario, Canada. The Charger shared the LX platform with the Chrysler 300, the newer third generation Dodge Challenger, and the discontinued Dodge Magnum.

== Total sales ==
Calendar year	United States	Canada	Mexico	Europe
2005	44,804	2,919	428	
2006	114,201	7,440	2,135	
2007	119,289	7,858	990	
2008	97,367	6,675	3,283	
2009	60,651	4,861	480	
2010	75,397	4,662	863	
2011	70,089	4,137	820	
2012	82,592	4,058	895	
2013	98,336	4,588	586	
2014	94,099	3,704	2,010	118
2015	94,725	4,518	800	125
2016	95,437	3,738	1,208	82
2017	88,351	4,862	635	109
2018	80,226	4,918	1,593	128
2019	96,935	3,425	1,922	
2020	77,425	1,659	485	
2021	78,389	1,924	2,306	
2022	80,074	3,156		
2023	75,920	3,591		
2024	34,754	839		
Subtotal	1,580,673	81,683	19,133	562
Total	1,682,051			
