= Planet Hot Wheels =

2001 video game

- Developers: Mattel; Hot Wheels
- Publisher: Mattel
- Series: Hot Wheels
- Platforms: Windows; Mac OS
- Release: 2001
- Genre: Massively multiplayer online racing
- Mode: Multiplayer (with some single-player)

Planet Hot Wheels was a massively multiplayer online racing game created by the developers of the toy car brand Hot Wheels and Mattel, Hot Wheels' parent company. The service launched in 2001.

The virtual racing game included story features based on the film Hot Wheels World Race, and used representations of real world Hot Wheels models. Users could race and play mini-games to earn credits, the currency of Planet Hot Wheels, and use them to purchase items and cars. Players could also buy specially marked Hot Wheels cars that came with a code; entering the code in the game would unlock that car model in the game, or upgrades in the form of items such as decals, paint jobs, weapons, and other components.

Planet Hot Wheels was heavily advertised in its first two years, but in 2004, when the game had been unavailable for some time with a message on the website saying that it would be back soon, Mattel permanently removed it from the website.

== Promotions ==
Mattel released six "energy" branded cars, based on the six weapon energy types usable in the main game types of Planet Hot Wheels (Electrical, Cyber, Particle, Protonic, Geothermal, and Chemical) that each came with a CD and a level from Stunt Track Driver 2 for each CD collected. When all six were collected, the player would be awarded with the track builder from Stunt Track Driver 2, giving players the option to create their own tracks in a 3D environment. Each car would also come with a code that would unlock the energy branded car to use in some of the games featured on the website.

The service was heavily promoted through advertisements on car blisters and on some select cars themselves. The popular Hot Wheels World Race subseries was integrated into Planet Hot Wheels through adding the cars featured in the film, and later in 2003, a revamped version of the services main "Head-to-Head" and "Full-on Rally" racing mode was released, featuring tracks inspired by the film. Other cars featured on the platform gained skins based on the cars featured in the film.

== Features ==
- A website-based UI that allowed users to create their account and play various games to earn credits, which can then be used to buy and upgrade cars.
- A code-entry page allowing users to enter codes they have received from diecast cars, which would grant the user in-game items or the digital car.
- Online "Head-to-Head" and "Full-on Rally" racing games, being the main attraction of the website.
- A cops and robbers-styled 3D game.
- A 3D drag racing minigame.
- A 3D hill-climbing minigame, with a Sour Punch advertisement tie-in.
- Various other minigames that earned additional credits for the player to use.
- An online chat room that allowed users to chat to each other, and also allowed users to chat with the team leaders from Hot Wheels World Race through pre-recorded messages.
