= Plug-in electric vehicles in the United States =

Top selling US electric cars, 2025

Tesla Model Y (357,528)

Tesla Model 3 (192,440)

Chevrolet Equinox EV (57,945)

The adoption of plug-in electric vehicles in the United States is variously supported and harmed by the American federal government, and states and local governments.

As of December 2025, cumulative sales in the U.S. totaled 7.6 million plug-in electric cars since 2010, led by all-electric cars. Sales totaled 1,503,694 units in 2025, with a market share of 7.4%. The American stock represented 10.4% of the global plug-in car fleet in use by the end of 2025 and the U.S. had the world's second largest stock of plug-in passenger cars after China (58.7%).

The U.S. market share of plug-in electric passenger cars was 7.4% of all new registrations in 2025, down from 8% in 2024. California is the largest regional market in the country, with 20.1% of new registered electric vehicles.

As of December 2025, the Tesla Model Y is the all-time best selling plug-in electric car, holding 39.5% of total US electric car sales with 357,528 units delivered in 2025.

The Energy Improvement and Extension Act of 2008 and later the Inflation Reduction Act granted federal tax credits for new qualified plug-in electric vehicles, worth up to US$7,500. The One Big Beautiful Bill Act ended the federal tax credit for both new and used BEV's starting on September 30, 2025.

== Overview by state ==
Articles about plug-in electric vehicles in individual states:

- Alabama
- Alaska
- Arizona
- Arkansas
- California
- Colorado
- Connecticut
- Delaware
- District of Columbia
- Florida
- Georgia
- Hawaii
- Idaho
- Illinois
- Indiana
- Iowa
- Kansas
- Kentucky
- Louisiana
- Maine
- Maryland
- Massachusetts
- Michigan
- Minnesota
- Mississippi
- Missouri
- Montana
- Nebraska
- Nevada
- New Hampshire
- New Jersey
- New Mexico
- New York
- North Carolina
- North Dakota
- Ohio
- Oklahoma
- Oregon
- Pennsylvania
- Rhode Island
- South Carolina
- South Dakota
- Tennessee
- Texas
- Utah
- Vermont
- Virginia
- Washington
- West Virginia
- Wisconsin
- Wyoming

== Government support ==
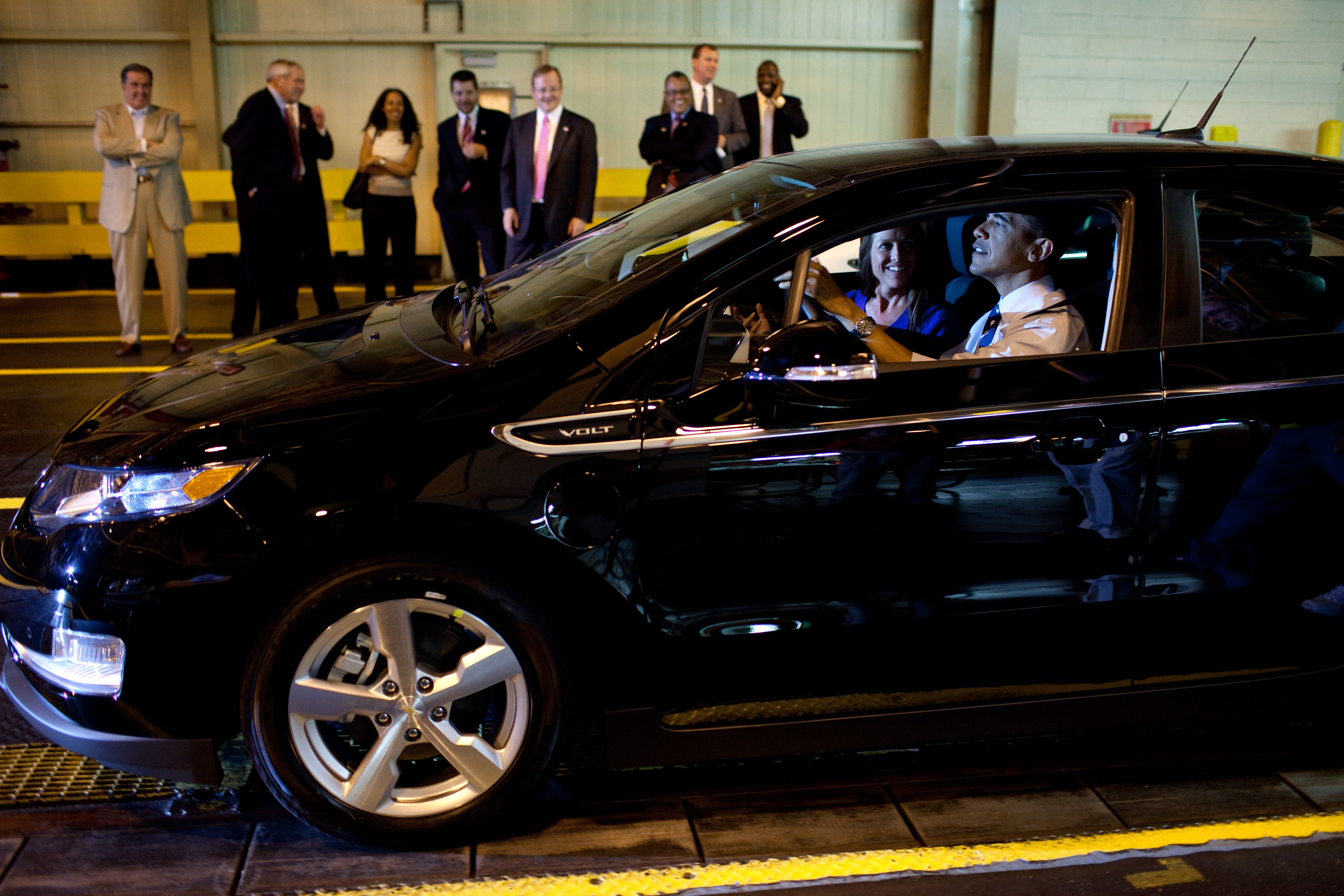
President Barack Obama behind the wheel of a new Chevrolet Volt during his tour of the General Motors Auto Plant in Hamtramck, Michigan in 2010

In his 2011 State of the Union address, President Barack Obama set the goal for the U.S. to become the first country to have one million electric vehicles on the road by 2015. This goal was established based on forecasts made by the U.S. Department of Energy (DoE), using production capacity of PEV models announced to enter the U.S. market through 2015. The DoE estimated a cumulative production of 1,222,200 PEVS by 2015.

Considering that actual PEV sales were lower than initially expected, as of early 2013, several industry observers have concluded that this goal was unattainable. Obama's goal was achieved only in September 2018.

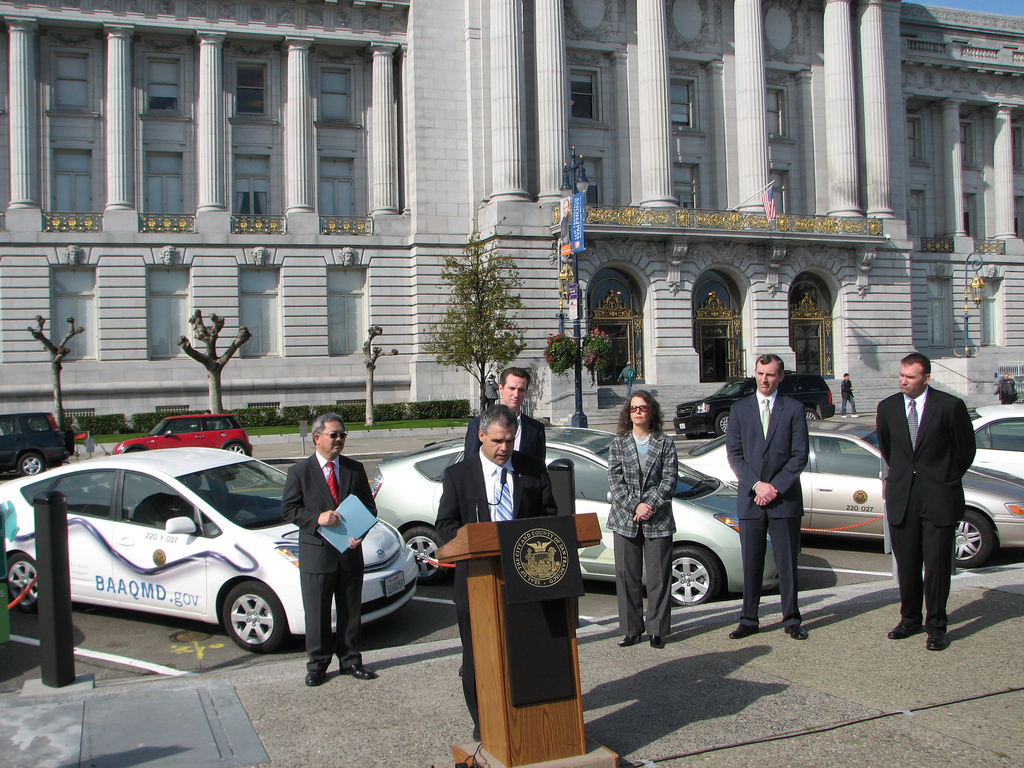
San Francisco Mayor Gavin Newsom at the opening of the public plug-in charging stations in front of San Francisco City Hall in 2009

In 2008, San Francisco Mayor Gavin Newsom, San Jose Mayor Chuck Reed and Oakland Mayor Ron Dellums announced a nine-step policy plan for transforming the Bay Area into the "Electric Vehicle (EV) Capital of the U.S.". Other local and state governments have also expressed interest in electric cars.

Governor of California Jerry Brown issued an executive order in March 2012 that established the goal of getting 1.5 million zero-emission vehicles (ZEVs) on California roads by 2025.

=== American Recovery and Reinvestment Act ===
President Barack Obama pledged US$2.4 billion in federal grants to support the development of next-generation electric vehicles and batteries. $1.5 billion in grants to U.S. based manufacturers to produce highly efficient batteries and their components; up to $500 million in grants to U.S. based manufacturers to produce other components needed for electric vehicles, such as electric motors and other components; and up to $400 million to demonstrate and evaluate plug-in hybrids and other electric infrastructure concepts—like truck stop charging station, electric rail, and training for technicians to build and repair electric vehicles (green collar jobs).

In March 2009, as part of the American Recovery and Reinvestment Act, the U.S. Department of Energy announced the release of two competitive solicitations for up to $2 billion in federal funding for competitively awarded cost-shared agreements for manufacturing of advanced batteries and related drive components as well as up to $400 million for transportation electrification demonstration and deployment projects. This initiative aimed to help meet President Barack Obama's goal of putting one million plug-in electric vehicles on the road by 2015.

=== Tax credits ===
===== Federal incentives =====
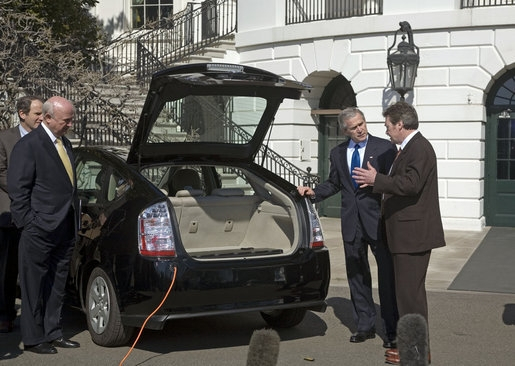
President Bush with A123Systems CEO on the White House South Lawn examining a Toyota Prius converted to plug-in hybrid with Hymotion technology

First the Energy Improvement and Extension Act of 2008, and later the American Clean Energy and Security Act of 2009 (ACES) granted tax credits for new qualified plug-in electric drive motor vehicles. The American Recovery and Reinvestment Act of 2009 (ARRA) also

authorized federal tax credits for converted plug-ins.

As defined by the 2009 ACES Act, a PEV is a vehicle which draws propulsion energy from a traction battery with at least 5 kwh of capacity and uses an offboard source of energy to recharge such battery. The tax credit for new plug-in electric vehicles was worth US$2,500 plus US$417 for each kilowatt-hour of battery capacity over 5 kwh, and the portion of the credit determined by battery capacity cannot exceed US$5,000. Therefore, the total amount of the credit, between US$2,500 and US$7,500, varied depending on the capacity of the battery (4 to 16 kWh) used to power the vehicles.

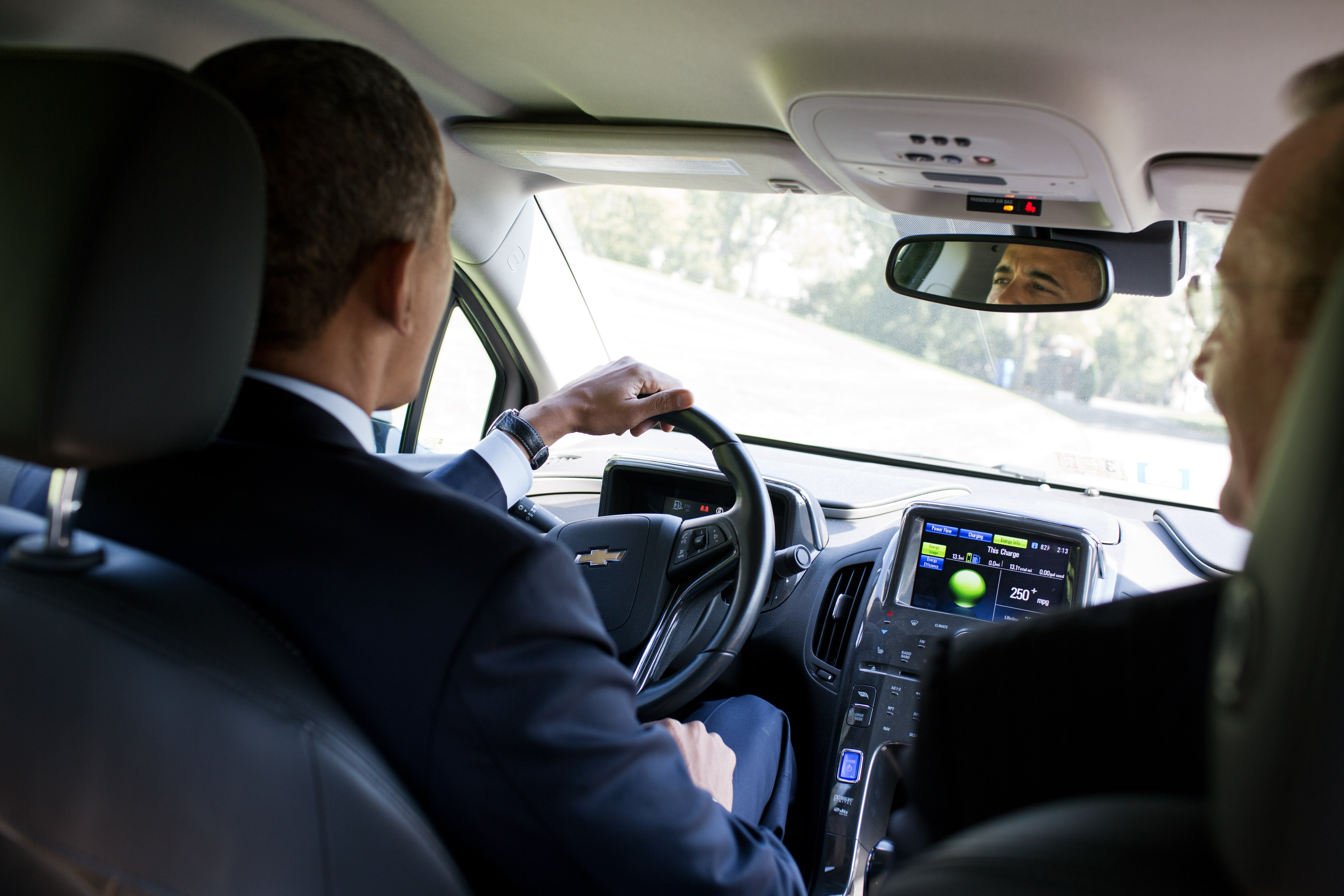
President Obama driving a Volt at the White House

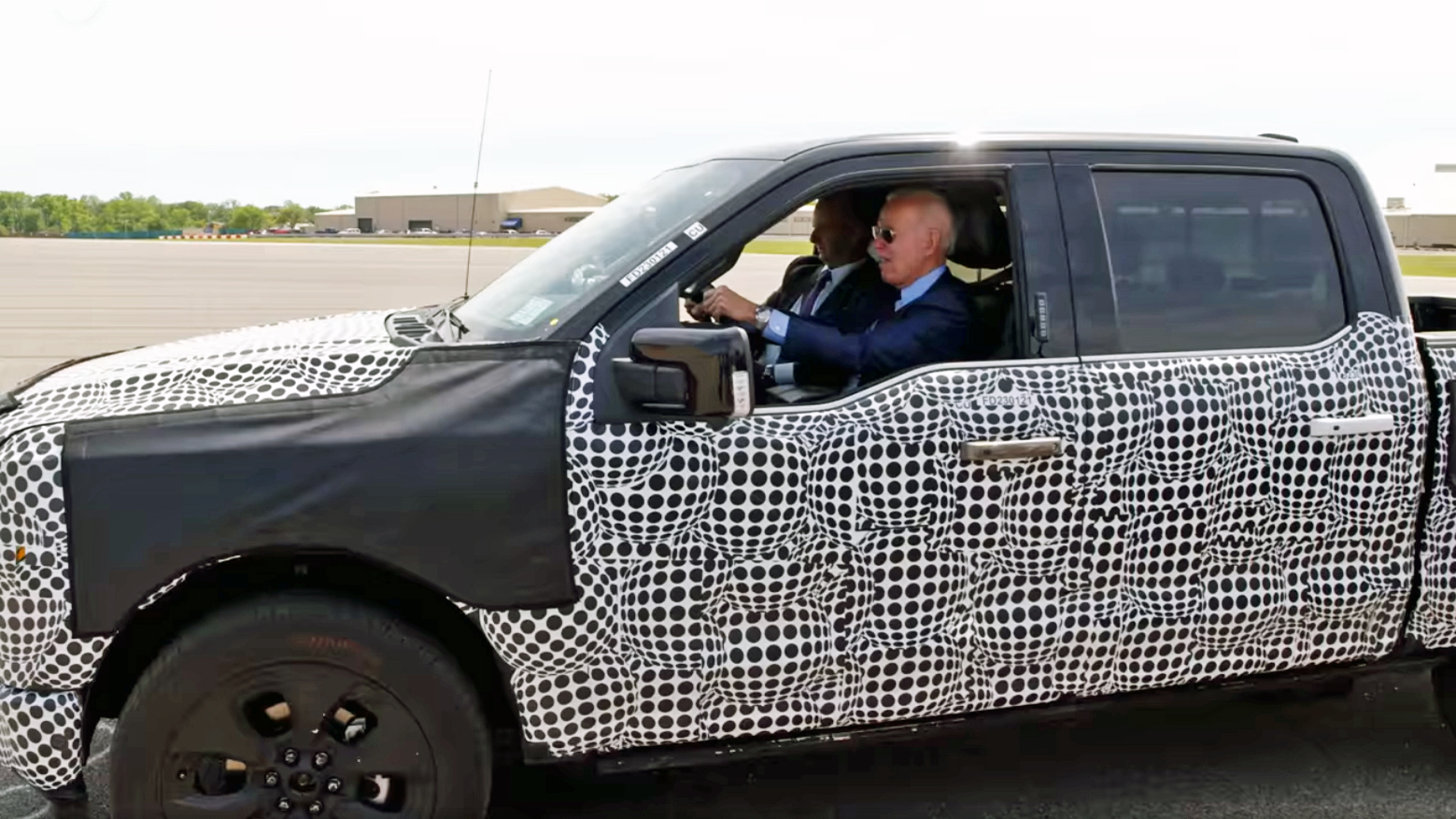
President Joe Biden test driving the Ford F-150 Lightning all-electric pick up at Ford's Rouge Electric Vehicle Center

A 2016 study conducted by researchers from the University of California, Davis found that the federal tax credit was the reason behind more than 30% of the plug-in electric sales.

A January 2024 study from the University of Michigan Center for Sustainable Systems found that the $7,500 tax credit and other federal incentives were needed to make BEVs cost competitive with ICEVs in many locations and for many vehicle classes.

===== State incentives =====
As of November 2026, 18 states currently offer incentives and tax or fee exemptions for BEVs and PHEVs. Additionally, those in states without state incentives may qualify for utility-rate breaks or credits for home charging infrastructure if their utility provider has them.

==== Charging equipment incentives ====
Until 2010 there was a federal tax credit equal to 50% of the cost to buy and install a home-based charging station with a maximum credit of US$2,000 for each station. Businesses qualified for tax credits up to US$50,000 for larger installations. These credits expired on December 31, 2010, but were extended through 2013 with a reduced tax credit equal to 30% with a maximum credit of up to US$1,000 for each station for individuals and up to US$30,000 for commercial buyers.

In 2016, the Obama administration and several stake holders announced $4.5 billion in loan guarantees for public charge stations, along with other initiatives.

The Inflation Reduction Act introduced a tax credit of 30%, up to US$1,000, on the cost of installation of a charging station. The tax credit ended on June 30, 2026

=== Other proposals ===
Several separate initiatives have been pursued unsuccessfully at the federal level since 2011 to transform the tax credit into an instant cash rebate. The objective of these initiatives is to make new qualifying plug-in electric cars more accessible to buyers by making the incentive more effective. The rebate would be available at the point of sale allowing consumers to avoid a wait of up to a year to apply the tax credit against income tax returns.

On March 7, 2012, President Barack Obama launched the EV Everywhere Challenge as part of the U.S. Department of Energy's Clean Energy Grand Challenges, which seeks to solve some of the U.S. biggest energy challenges and make clean energy technologies affordable and accessible to the vast majority of American households and businesses. The EV Everywhere Challenge would of have the goal of advancing electric vehicle technologies to have the country, by 2022, to produce a five-passenger electric vehicle that would provide both a payback time of less than five years and the ability to be recharged quickly enough to provide enough range for the typical American driver.

In January 2013, during the Washington Auto Show, Secretary of Energy Steven Chu announced an initiative to expand the EV Everywhere program with the "Workplace Charging Challenge." This initiative is a plan to install more electric vehicle charging stations in workplace parking lots.

In March 2014, the Obama administration included a provision in the FY 2015 Budget that would of increase the maximum tax credit for plug-in electric vehicles and other advanced vehicles from US$7,500 to US$10,000.

In December 2021, the Biden administration imposed Executive Order 14057, a nationwide federal government mandate that would have banned new fossil fuel vehicles from all 50 US States, Washington, D.C., and all US Territories by 2035 to push the transition to electric vehicles. The order was revoked by President Donald Trump on January 20, 2025.

=== U.S. military ===
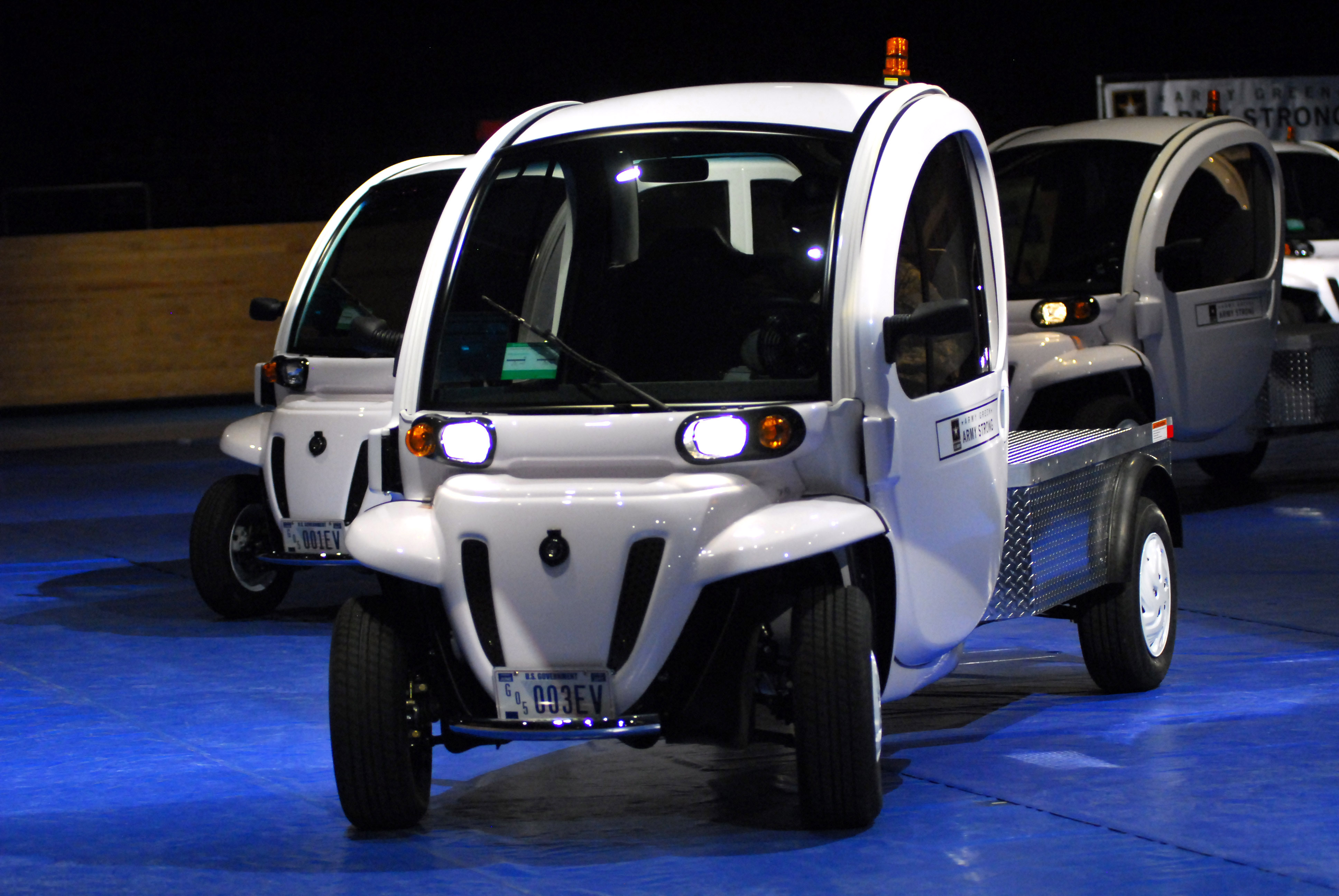
The first six neighborhood electric vehicles delivered to the U.S. Army in January 2009 as part of its plan to lease more than 4,000 of the vehicles

The U.S. Army announced in 2009 that it will lease 4,000 Neighborhood Electric Vehicles (NEVs) within three years. The Army plans to use NEVs at its bases for transporting people around the base, as well as for security patrols and maintenance and delivery services. The Army accepted its first six NEVs at Virginia's Fort Myer in March 2009 and will lease a total of 600 NEVs through the rest of the year, followed by the leasing of 1,600 NEVs for each of the following two years.

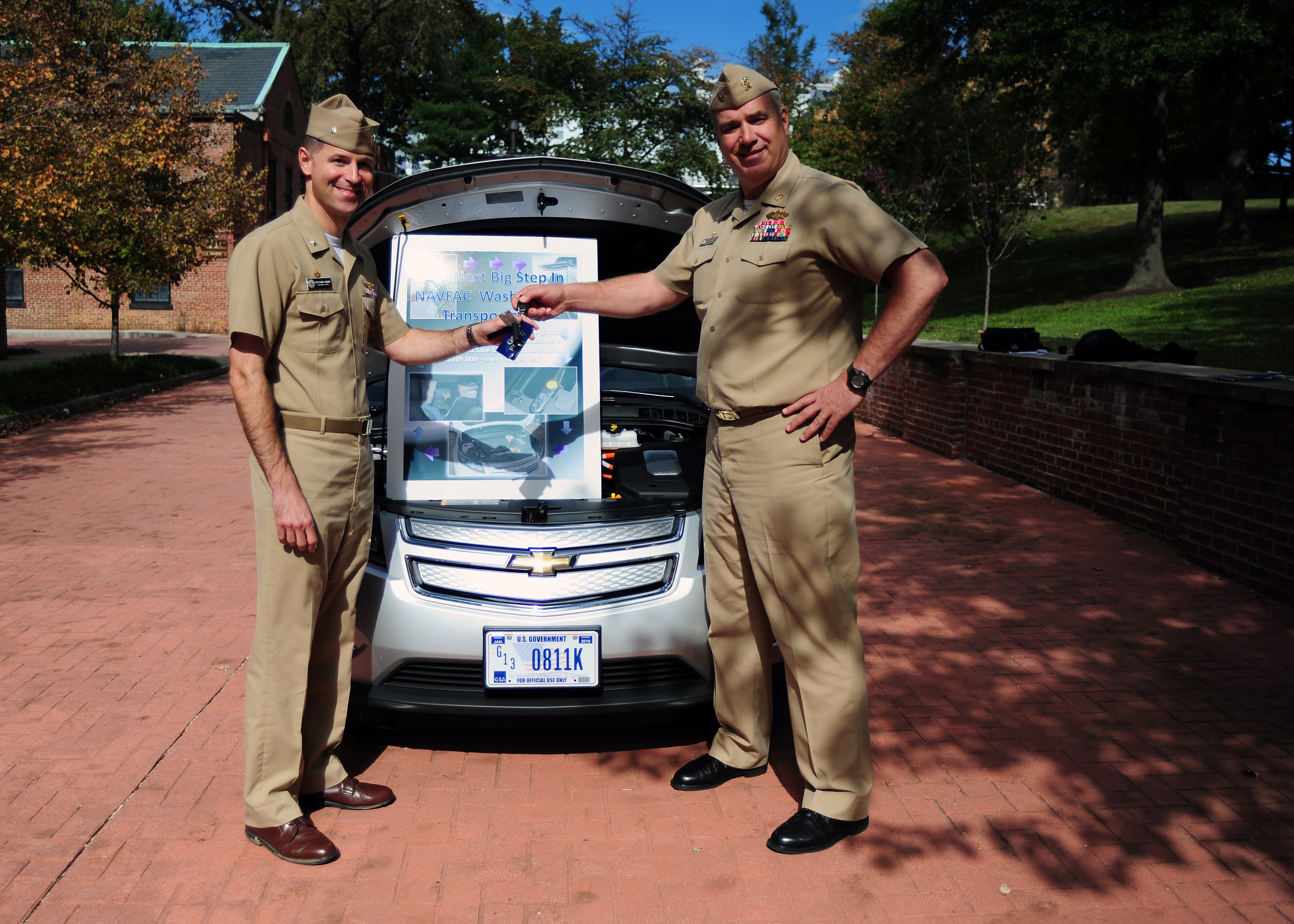
Chevrolet Volt delivered as part of the U.S. Department of Defense and General Services Administration Plug-in Hybrid Electric Vehicles Pilot project

U.S. Air Force officials announced, in August 2011, a plan to establish Los Angeles Air Force Base, California, as the first federal facility to replace 100% of its general purpose fleet with plug-in electric vehicles. As part of the program, all Air Force-owned and -leased general purpose fleet vehicles on the base will be replaced with PEVs.

By May 2013, it was announced that, as part of a test program created in January 2013, 500 plug-in electric vehicles with vehicle-to-grid (V2G) technology would be in use at six military bases, purchased using an investment of $20 million. If the program succeeds, there will be 3,000 V2G vehicles in 30 bases.

The National Defense Authorization Act passed in December 2022 would required new non-combat military vehicles be electric by 2035.

=== Safety laws ===
Due to the low noise typical of electric vehicles at low speeds, the National Highway Traffic Safety Administration ruled that all hybrids and EVs must emit artificial noise when idling, accelerating to 19 mph (30 km/h) or going in reverse by September 2019.

=== U.S. commitments to the 2015 Paris Agreement ===
As a signatory party to the 2015 Paris Climate Agreement, the United States government committed to reduce its greenhouse gas emissions, among others, from the transportation sector. Already in 2015, the Federal government had set targets to reduce its own carbon footprint 30% by 2025, and acquire 20% of all new passenger vehicles as zero emission (all-electric of fuel cell) or plug-in hybrid by 2020, and 50% by 2025. These goals are part of the U.S. nationally determined contributions (NDCs) to achieve the worldwide emissions reduction goal set by the Paris Agreement.

On June 1, 2017, President Donald Trump announced that the U.S. would cease all participation in the 2015 Paris Agreement on climate change mitigation.

On January 20, 2021, President Joe Biden signed an executive order re-entering the agreement. When Donald Trump was re-elected to a second term in 2024, he signed an executive order removing the U.S. from the agreement for a second time.

== Government opposition ==
In the US, there has been political opposition and pushback towards the adoption of BEV's and PHEV's.

===== Federal opposition =====
The Republican Party is firmly against electric vehicle mandates, stating that they would crush US domestic production, make vehicles more expensive, and take away the choice of vehicle purchase away from US purchasers. 77% of Republican voters in 2024 were against buying an electric vehicle.

In November 2017, during the first Trump administration, House Republicans proposed scrapping the US$7,500 tax credit as part of a sweeping tax overhaul, which ultimately failed to pass. They would eventually succeed in ending the tax credit during the second Trump administration as part of the One Big Beautiful Bill Act that was passed on July 4, 2025, and as a result BEV sales in the US dropped drastically. Several automakers either discontinued or cancelled their upcoming BEV models that were destined for the US in response to the loss of tax credits and low demand from the US market. Electric vehicle manufacturer Polestar left the US market altogether in June 2026 after being denied an authorization by the Department of Commerce to sell new vehicles in the US after 2026 due to the departments Connected Vehicle Rule.

Draft proposals of the One Big Beautiful Bill Act included charging a $250 yearly fee to BEV owners, but was ultimately left out. A proposed rule in the BUILD America 250 Act would require all BEV owners to pay a maximum of $150 a year to register a BEV, and $50 to register a PHEV, on top of any potential state imposed registration fees.

The second Trump administration also ended many of the Biden administrations actions that would of increased the adoption of electric vehicles in the US, including voiding Executive Order 14057, signing laws attempting to end California's emissions standards and plan to ban ICEV sales by 2035, and allowing weaker fuel efficiency standards in new vehicles.

== Air pollution and greenhouse gas emissions ==
Electric cars, as well as plug-in hybrids operating in all-electric mode, emit no harmful tailpipe pollutants from the onboard source of power, such as particulates (soot), volatile organic compounds, hydrocarbons, carbon monoxide, ozone, lead, and various oxides of nitrogen. The clean air benefit is usually local because, depending on the source of the electricity used to recharge the batteries, air pollutant emissions are shifted to the location of the generation plants. In a similar manner, plug-in electric vehicles operating in all-electric mode do not emit greenhouse gases from the onboard source of power, but from the point of view of a well-to-wheel assessment, the extent of the benefit also depends on the fuel and technology used for electricity generation. From the perspective of a full life cycle analysis, the electricity used to recharge the batteries must be generated from renewable or clean sources such as wind, solar, hydroelectric, or nuclear power for PEVs to have almost none or zero well-to-wheel emissions.

=== EPA estimates ===
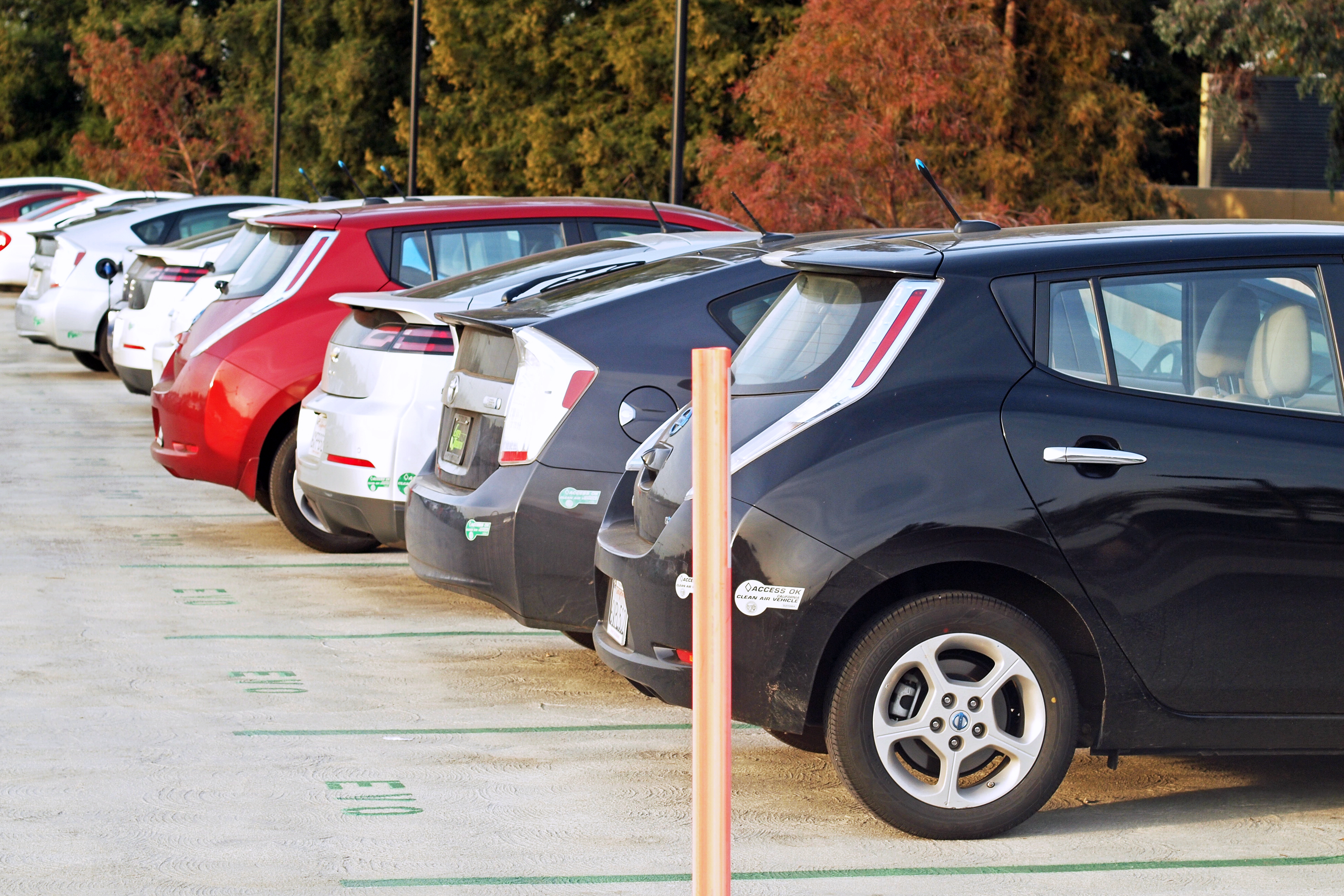
Several Nissan Leafs, Chevrolet Volts and Toyota Prius Plug-in Hybrids charging at a parking lot reserved for plug-in electric vehicles in California

The following table compares tailpipe and upstream CO_{2} emissions estimated by the U.S. Environmental Protection Agency for a select group of model year 2024 plug-in electric vehicles available in the U.S. market. Total emissions include the emissions associated with the production and distribution of electricity used to charge the vehicle, and for plug-in hybrid electric vehicles, it also includes emissions associated with tailpipe emissions produced from the internal combustion engine..

In order to account for the upstream CO_{2} emissions associated with the production and distribution of electricity, and since electricity production in the United States varies significantly from region to region, the EPA considered three scenarios/ranges with the low end scenario corresponding to the California power plant emissions factor, the middle of the range represented by the national average power plant emissions factor, and the upper end of the range corresponding to the power plant emissions factor for Illinois and Missouri.

Comparison of tailpipe and upstream CO_{2} emissions estimated by EPA for the MY 2024 plug-in electric vehicles available in the U.S. market
Vehicle	Overall fuel economy (mpg-e)	Tailpipe CO_{2} (g/mi)	Tailpipe + total upstream CO_{2}		
Vehicle	Overall fuel economy (mpg-e)	Tailpipe CO_{2} (g/mi)	Low (g/mi)	Avg (g/mi)	High (g/mi)
Tesla Model 3	130	0	67	107	173
Hyundai Ioniq 6	121	0	73	116	188
Nissan Leaf	109	0	80	128	206
Chevrolet Equinox EV	96	0	91	146	235
Toyota Prius Plug-in Hybrid	89	50	111	139	186
Ford F-150 Lightning	66	0	132	211	340
Chrysler Pacifica Hybrid	48	119	214	254	318
Volvo XC60 Recharge	44	122	236	286	368
BMW XM	24	244	419	488	599

=== Union of Concerned Scientists ===
==== 2012 study ====
The Union of Concerned Scientists (UCS) has been releasing studies since 2012 that has assessed average greenhouse gas emissions in the U.S. resulting from charging plug-in car batteries from the perspective of the full life-cycle (well-to-wheel analysis) and according to fuel and technology used to generate electric power by region. The study used the Nissan Leaf all-electric car to establish the analysis baseline, and electric-utility emissions are based on EPA's 2009 estimates. The UCS study expressed the results in terms of miles per gallon instead of the conventional unit of grams of greenhouse gases or carbon dioxide equivalent emissions per year in order to make the results more friendly for consumers. The study found that in areas where electricity is generated from natural gas, nuclear, hydroelectric or renewable sources, the potential of plug-in electric cars to reduce greenhouse emissions is significant. On the other hand, in regions where a high proportion of power is generated from coal, hybrid electric cars produce less CO_{2}-e equivalent emissions than plug-in electric cars, and the best fuel efficient gasoline-powered subcompact car produces slightly less emissions than a PEV. In the worst-case scenario, the study estimated that for a region where all energy is generated from coal, a plug-in electric car would emit greenhouse gas emissions equivalent to a gasoline car rated at a combined city/highway driving fuel economy of 30 mpg_{‑US} (7.8 L/100 km; 36 mpg_{‑imp}). In contrast, in a region that is completely reliant on natural gas, the PEV would be equivalent to a gasoline-powered car rated at 50 mpg_{‑US} (4.7 L/100 km; 60 mpg_{‑imp}).

The study concluded that for 45% of the U.S. population, a plug-in electric car will generate lower CO_{2} equivalent emissions than a gasoline-powered car capable of combined 50 mpg_{‑US} (4.7 L/100 km; 60 mpg_{‑imp}), such as the Toyota Prius and the Prius c. The study also found that for 37% of the population, the electric car emissions will fall in the range of a gasoline-powered car rated at a combined fuel economy of 41 to 50 mpg_{‑US} (5.7 to 4.7 L/100 km; 49 to 60 mpg_{‑imp}), such as the Honda Civic Hybrid and the Lexus CT200h. Only 18% of the population lives in areas where the power-supply is more dependent on burning carbon, and the greenhouse gas emissions will be equivalent to a car rated at a combined fuel economy of 31 to 40 mpg_{‑US} (7.6 to 5.9 L/100 km; 37 to 48 mpg_{‑imp}), such as the Chevrolet Cruze and Ford Focus. The study found that there are no regions in the U.S. where plug-in electric cars will have higher greenhouse gas emissions than the average new compact gasoline engine automobile, and the area with the dirtiest power supply produces CO_{2} emissions equivalent to a gasoline-powered car rated at 33 mpg_{‑US} (7.1 L/100 km).

The following table shows a representative sample of cities within each of the three categories of emissions intensity used in the UCS study, showing the corresponding miles per gallon equivalent for each city as compared to the greenhouse gas emissions of a gasoline-powered car:

Regional comparison of full life cycle assessment of greenhouse gas emissions resulting from charging plug-in electric vehicles expressed in terms of miles per gallon of a gasoline-powered car with equivalent emissions
Rating scale by emissions intensity expressed as miles per gallon	City	PEV well-to-wheels carbon dioxide equivalent (CO_{2}-e) emissions per year expressed as mpg US	Percent reduction in CO_{2}-e emissions compared with 27 mpg US average new compact car	Combined EPA's rated fuel economy and GHG emissions for reference gasoline-powered car	
Best; LowestCO_{2}-e emissions equivalent to over 50 mpg_{‑US} (4.7 L/100 km)	Juneau, Alaska	112 mpg_{‑US} (2.10 L/100 km)	315%	2012 Toyota Prius/Prius c 50 mpg_{‑US} (4.7 L/100 km)	
Best; LowestCO_{2}-e emissions equivalent to over 50 mpg_{‑US} (4.7 L/100 km)	San Francisco	79 mpg_{‑US} (3.0 L/100 km)	193%	2012 Toyota Prius/Prius c 50 mpg_{‑US} (4.7 L/100 km)	
Best; LowestCO_{2}-e emissions equivalent to over 50 mpg_{‑US} (4.7 L/100 km)	New York City	74 mpg_{‑US} (3.2 L/100 km)	174%	2012 Toyota Prius/Prius c 50 mpg_{‑US} (4.7 L/100 km)	
Best; LowestCO_{2}-e emissions equivalent to over 50 mpg_{‑US} (4.7 L/100 km)	Portland, Oregon	73 mpg_{‑US} (3.2 L/100 km)	170%	Greenhouse gas emissions (grams/mile)	
Best; LowestCO_{2}-e emissions equivalent to over 50 mpg_{‑US} (4.7 L/100 km)	Boston	67 mpg_{‑US} (3.5 L/100 km)	148%	Tailpipe CO_{2}	Upstream GHG
Best; LowestCO_{2}-e emissions equivalent to over 50 mpg_{‑US} (4.7 L/100 km)	Washington, D.C.	58 mpg_{‑US} (4.1 L/100 km)	115%	178 g/mi (111 g/km)	44 g/mi (27 g/km)
Better; Moderate CO_{2}-e emissions equivalent to between 41 mpg_{‑US} (5.7 L/100 km) and 50 mpg_{‑US} (4.7 L/100 km)	Phoenix, Arizona	48 mpg_{‑US} (4.9 L/100 km)	78%	2012 Honda Civic Hybrid; 44 mpg_{‑US} (5.3 L/100 km)	
Better; Moderate CO_{2}-e emissions equivalent to between 41 mpg_{‑US} (5.7 L/100 km) and 50 mpg_{‑US} (4.7 L/100 km)	Miami	47 mpg_{‑US} (5.0 L/100 km)	74%	2012 Honda Civic Hybrid; 44 mpg_{‑US} (5.3 L/100 km)	
Better; Moderate CO_{2}-e emissions equivalent to between 41 mpg_{‑US} (5.7 L/100 km) and 50 mpg_{‑US} (4.7 L/100 km)	Houston	46 mpg_{‑US} (5.1 L/100 km)	70%	Greenhouse gas emissions (grams/mile)	
Better; Moderate CO_{2}-e emissions equivalent to between 41 mpg_{‑US} (5.7 L/100 km) and 50 mpg_{‑US} (4.7 L/100 km)	Columbus, Ohio	41 mpg_{‑US} (5.7 L/100 km)	52%	Tailpipe CO_{2}	Upstream GHG
Better; Moderate CO_{2}-e emissions equivalent to between 41 mpg_{‑US} (5.7 L/100 km) and 50 mpg_{‑US} (4.7 L/100 km)	Atlanta	41 mpg_{‑US} (5.7 L/100 km)	52%	202 g/mi (125 g/km)	50 g/mi (31 g/km)
Good; Highest CO_{2}-e emissions equivalent to between 31 mpg_{‑US} (7.6 L/100 km) and 40 mpg_{‑US} (5.9 L/100 km)	Detroit	38 mpg_{‑US} (6.2 L/100 km)	41%	2012 Chevrolet Cruze; 30 mpg_{‑US} (7.8 L/100 km)	
Good; Highest CO_{2}-e emissions equivalent to between 31 mpg_{‑US} (7.6 L/100 km) and 40 mpg_{‑US} (5.9 L/100 km)	Des Moines, Iowa	37 mpg_{‑US} (6.4 L/100 km)	37%	2012 Chevrolet Cruze; 30 mpg_{‑US} (7.8 L/100 km)	
Good; Highest CO_{2}-e emissions equivalent to between 31 mpg_{‑US} (7.6 L/100 km) and 40 mpg_{‑US} (5.9 L/100 km)	St. Louis, Missouri	36 mpg_{‑US} (6.5 L/100 km)	33%	Greenhouse gas emissions (grams/mile)	
Good; Highest CO_{2}-e emissions equivalent to between 31 mpg_{‑US} (7.6 L/100 km) and 40 mpg_{‑US} (5.9 L/100 km)	Wichita, Kansas	35 mpg_{‑US} (6.7 L/100 km)	30%	Tailpipe CO_{2}	Upstream GHG
Good; Highest CO_{2}-e emissions equivalent to between 31 mpg_{‑US} (7.6 L/100 km) and 40 mpg_{‑US} (5.9 L/100 km)	Denver	33 mpg_{‑US} (7.1 L/100 km)	22%	296 g/mi (184 g/km)	73 g/mi (45 g/km)
Source: Union of Concerned Scientists, 2012. Notes: The Nissan Leaf is the baseline car for the assessment, with an energy consumption rated by EPA at 34 kWh/100 mi or 99 miles per gallon gasoline equivalent (2.4 L/100 km) combined. The ratings are based on a region's mix of electricity sources and its average emissions intensity over the course of a year. In practice the electricity grid is very dynamic, with the mix of power plants constantly changing in response to hourly, daily and seasonal electricity demand, and availability of electricity resources.

==== 2014 update ====
In September 2014 the UCS published an updated analysis of its 2012 report. The 2014 analysis found that 60% of Americans, up from 45% in 2009, live in regions where an all-electric car produce fewer CO_{2} equivalent emissions per mile than the most efficient hybrid. The UCS study found several reasons for the improvement. First, electric utilities have adopted cleaner sources of electricity to their mix between the two analysis. The 2014 study used electric-utility emissions based on EPA's 2010 estimates, but since coal use nationwide is down by about 5% from 2010 to 2014, actual efficiency in 2014 is expected to be better than estimated in the UCS study. Second, electric vehicles have become more efficient, as the average model year 2013 all-electric vehicle used 0.325 kWh/mile, representing a 5% improvement over 2011 models. The Nissan Leaf, used as the reference model for the baseline of the 2012 study, was upgraded in model year 2013 to achieve a rating of 0.30 kWh/mile, a 12% improvement over the 2011 model year model rating of 0.34 kWh/mile. Also, some new models are cleaner than the average, such as the BMW i3, which is rated at 0.27 kWh by the EPA. An i3 charged with power from the Midwest grid would be as clean as a gasoline-powered car with about 50 mpg_{‑US} (4.7 L/100 km), up from 39 mpg_{‑US} (6.0 L/100 km) for the average electric car in the 2012 study. In states with a cleaner mix generation, the gains were larger. The average all-electric car in California went up to 95 mpg_{‑US} (2.5 L/100 km) equivalent from 78 mpg_{‑US} (3.0 L/100 km) in the 2012 study. States with dirtier generation that rely heavily on coal still lag, such as Colorado, where the average BEV only achieves the same emissions as a 34 mpg_{‑US} (6.9 L/100 km; 41 mpg_{‑imp}) gasoline-powered car. The author of the 2014 analysis noted that the benefits are not distributed evenly across the U.S. because electric car adoption is concentrated in the states with cleaner power.

==== 2015 study ====
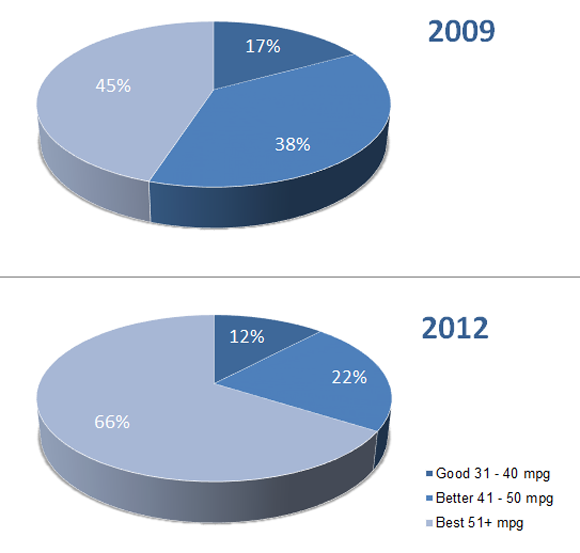
Change from 2009 to 2012 of the percentage of Americans that live in regions where powering an electric vehicle on the regional electricity grid produces lower global warming emissions than a gasoline car expressed in terms of combined city/highway fuel economy rating. Source: Union of Concerned Scientists.

External media

Images
- 2015 vehicle emissions

Video
- Video on YouTube

In November 2015 the Union of Concerned Scientists published a new report comparing two battery electric vehicles (BEVs) with similar gasoline vehicles by examining their global warming emissions over their full life-cycle, cradle-to-grave analysis. The two BEVs modeled, midsize and full-size, are based on the two most popular BEV models sold in the United States in 2015, the Nissan Leaf and the Tesla Model S. The study found that all-electric cars representative of those sold today, on average produce less than half the global warming emissions of comparable gasoline-powered vehicles, despite taken into account the higher emissions associated with BEV manufacturing. Considering the regions where the two most popular electric cars are being sold, excess manufacturing emissions are offset within 6 to 16 months of average driving. The study also concluded that driving an average EV results in lower global warming emissions than driving a gasoline car that gets 50 mpg_{‑US} (4.7 L/100 km) in regions covering two-thirds of the U.S. population, up from 45% in 2009. Based on where EVs are being sold in the United States in 2015, the average EV produces global warming emissions equal to a gasoline vehicle with a 68 mpg_{‑US} (3.5 L/100 km) fuel economy rating. The authors identified two main reason for the fact that EV-related emissions have become even lower in many parts of the country since the first study was conducted in 2012. Electricity generation has been getting cleaner, as coal-fired generation has declined while lower-carbon alternatives have increased. In addition, electric cars are becoming more efficient. For example, the Nissan Leaf and the Chevrolet Volt, have undergone improvements to increase their efficiencies compared to the original models launched in 2010, and other even more efficient BEV models, such as the most lightweight and efficient BMW i3, have entered the market.

=== Marginal emissions ===
When computing the short-term impact of additional EVs on the grid, the additional greenhouse gas emissions are better estimated using not the average emissions of the grid at a location, but instead the additional (marginal) emissions caused by the extra demand. The former approach does not take into account the generation mix within interconnected electricity markets and shifting load profiles throughout the day. An analysis by three economist affiliated with the National Bureau of Economic Research (NBER), published in 2014, developed a methodology to estimate marginal emissions of electricity demand that vary by location and time of day across the United States. The study used emissions and consumption data for 2007 through 2009, and used the specifications for the Chevrolet Volt (all-electric range of 35 mi (56 km)). The analysis found that marginal emission rates are more than three times as large in the Upper Midwest compared to the Western U.S., and within regions, rates for some hours of the day are more than twice those for others. Applying the results of the marginal analysis to plug-in electric vehicles, the NBER researchers found that the emissions of charging PEVs vary by region and hours of the day. In some regions, such as the Western U.S. and Texas, CO_{2} emissions per mile from driving PEVs are less than those from driving a hybrid car. However, in other regions, such as the Upper Midwest, charging during the recommended hours of midnight to 4 a.m. implies that PEVs generate more emissions per mile than the average car currently on the road. The results show a fundamental tension between electricity load management and environmental goals as the hours when electricity is the least expensive to produce tend to be the hours with the greatest emissions. This occurs because coal-fired units, which have higher emission rates, are most commonly used to meet base-level and off-peak electricity demand; while natural gas units, which have relatively low emissions rates, are often brought online to meet peak demand. This pattern of fuel shifting explains why emission rates tend to be higher at night and lower during periods of peak demand in the morning and evening.

== Environmental footprint ==
In February 2014, the Automotive Science Group (ASG) published the result of a study conducted to assess the life-cycle of over 1,300 automobiles across nine categories sold in North America. The study found that among advanced automotive technologies, the Nissan Leaf holds the smallest life-cycle environmental footprint of any model year 2014 automobile available in the North American market with minimum four-person occupancy. The study concluded that the increased environmental impacts of manufacturing the battery electric technology is more than offset with increased environmental performance during operational life. For the assessment, the study used the average electricity mix of the U.S. grid in 2014. In the 2014 mid-size cars category, the Leaf also ranked as the best all-around performance, best environmental and best social performance. The Ford Focus Electric, within the 2014 compact cars category, ranked as the best all-around performance, best environmental and best social performance. The Tesla Model S ranked as the best environmental performance in the 2014 full-size cars category.

== Charging infrastructure ==
As of October 2026, the United States had 263,218 charging points across the country.

The most prevalent charging stations in the US are from the Tesla Supercharger network, launched in 2012, with over 2500 stalls. Other charging station operators include Electrify America, launched in May 2019, and Ionna, launched in February 2024.

Top ten states ranked by number of public charging points available in the United States (as of November 2026)
State	Number of points	State	Number of points
California	69,659	Colorado	7,950
New York	20,581	Georgia	7,710
Florida	15,482	New Jersey	7,114
Texas	13,165	Pennsylvania	5,921
Massachusetts	11,845	Michigan	5,754
Washington	9,230	Total U.S.	263,218

== Markets and sales ==
=== National market ===
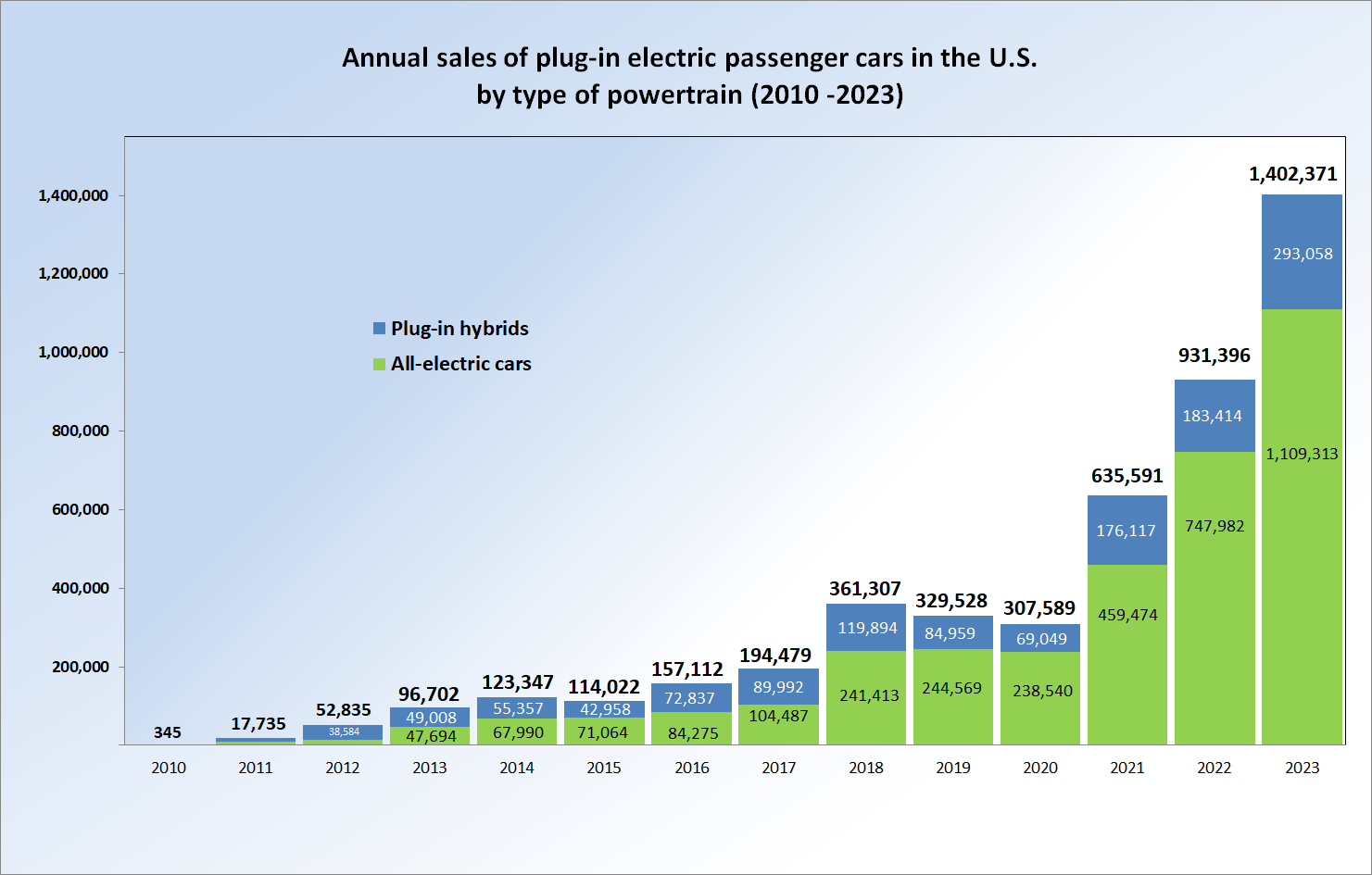
U.S. annual sales of plug-in passenger cars between 2010 and 2023.

As of December 2023, cumulative sales of highway legal plug-in electric cars in the U.S. totaled 4,684,128 units since 2010. Sales totaled 1,402,371 units in 2023, with a market share of 9.1%. This was the first time the American market surpassed the 1 million sales mark. As of December 2019, the American stock represented 20% of the global plug-in car fleet in use, down from about 40% in 2014. Sales in the American market are led by California with 1 million plug-in cars registered by November 2021, 46% of the national stock.

As of December 2014, the United States had the world's largest stock of light-duty plug-in electric vehicles, and led annual plug-in car sales in calendar year 2014. By May 2016, the European stock of light-duty had surpassed the U.S. By the end of September 2016, the Chinese stock of plug-in passenger cars reached the level of the American plug-in stock, and by November 2016, China's cumulative total plug-in passenger vehicles sales had surpassed those of Europe, allowing China to become the market with the world's largest stock of light-duty plug-in electric vehicles. China also surpassed both the U.S. and Europe in terms of annual sales of light-duty plug-in electric vehicles since 2015.

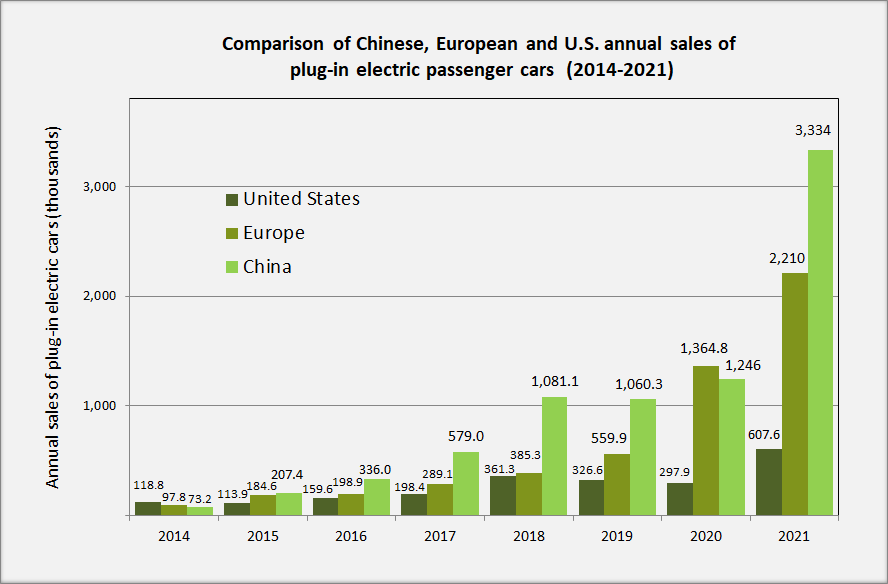
Comparison of annual plug-in electric car sales between China, Europe, and the U.S. (2014 - 2021)

National sales increased from 17,800 units delivered in 2011 to 53,200 during 2012, and reached 97,100 in 2013, up 83% from the previous year. During 2014 plug-in electric car sales totaled 123,347 units, up 27.0% from 2013, and fell to 114,248 units in 2015, down 7.4% from 2014. A total of 157,181 plug-in cars were sold in 2016, up 37.6% from 2015, rose to 199,818 in 2017, and achieved a record sales volume of 361,307 units in 2018. Sales declined in 2019 to 329,528 units.

The market share of plug-in electric passenger cars increased from 0.14% in 2011 to 0.37% in 2012, 0.62% in 2013, and reached 0.75% of new car sales in 2014. As plug-in car sales slowed down during the 2015, the segment's market share fell to 0.66% of new car sales, then increased to 0.90% in 2016. The market share passed the 1% mark for the first time in 2017 (1.13%). Then in 2018 the take-rate rose to 2.1%, but declined to 1.9% in 2019.

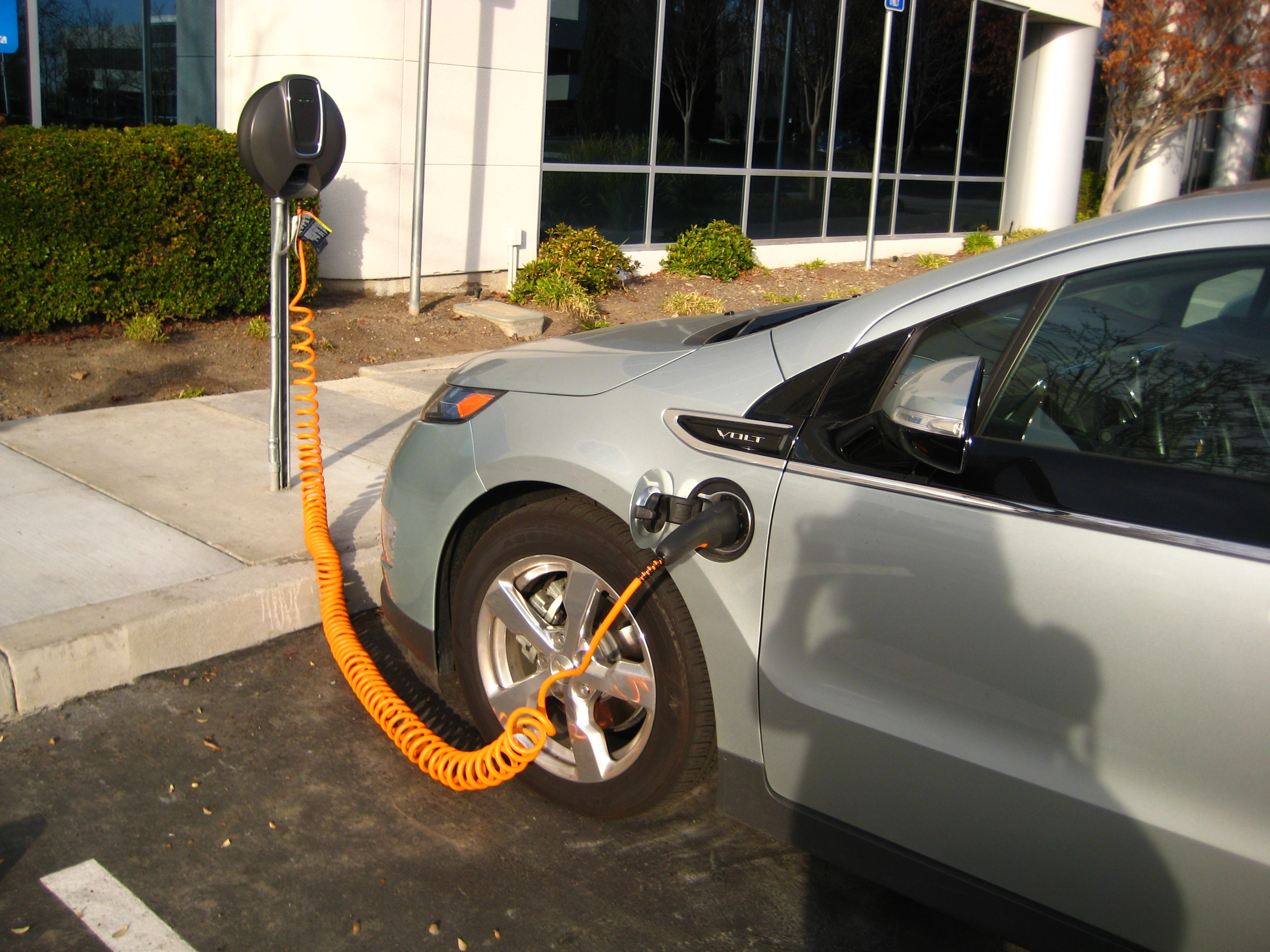
Until January 2019, the Chevrolet Volt was the all-time best selling plug-in electric car in the U.S.

In July 2016, the Volt became the first plug-in vehicle in the American market to achieve the 100,000 unit sales milestone. Leaf sales achieved the 100,000 unit milestone in October 2016, becoming the first all-electric vehicle in the country to pass that mark. The Model S achieved the mark of 100,000 sales in the U.S. in June 2017, launched in June 2012, the Model S hit this milestone quicker than both the Volt and the Leaf. Launched in July 2017, the Tesla Model 3 reached the 100,000 unit milestone in November 2018, hitting this milestone quicker than any previous model sold in the U.S.

As of December 2018, the Chevrolet Volt plug-in hybrid listed as the all-time best selling plug-in electric car with 152,144 units of both generations. The Model S was the best selling plug-in car in the U.S. for three consecutive years, from 2015 to 2017, and the Model 3 topped sales in 2018 and 2019. The Model 3 surpassed in 2019 the discontinued Chevrolet Volt to become the all-time best selling plug-in car in U.S. history, with an estimated 300,471 units delivered since inception, followed by the Tesla Model S all-electric car with about 157,992, and the Chevrolet Volt with 157,054.

==== Sales by powertrain ====
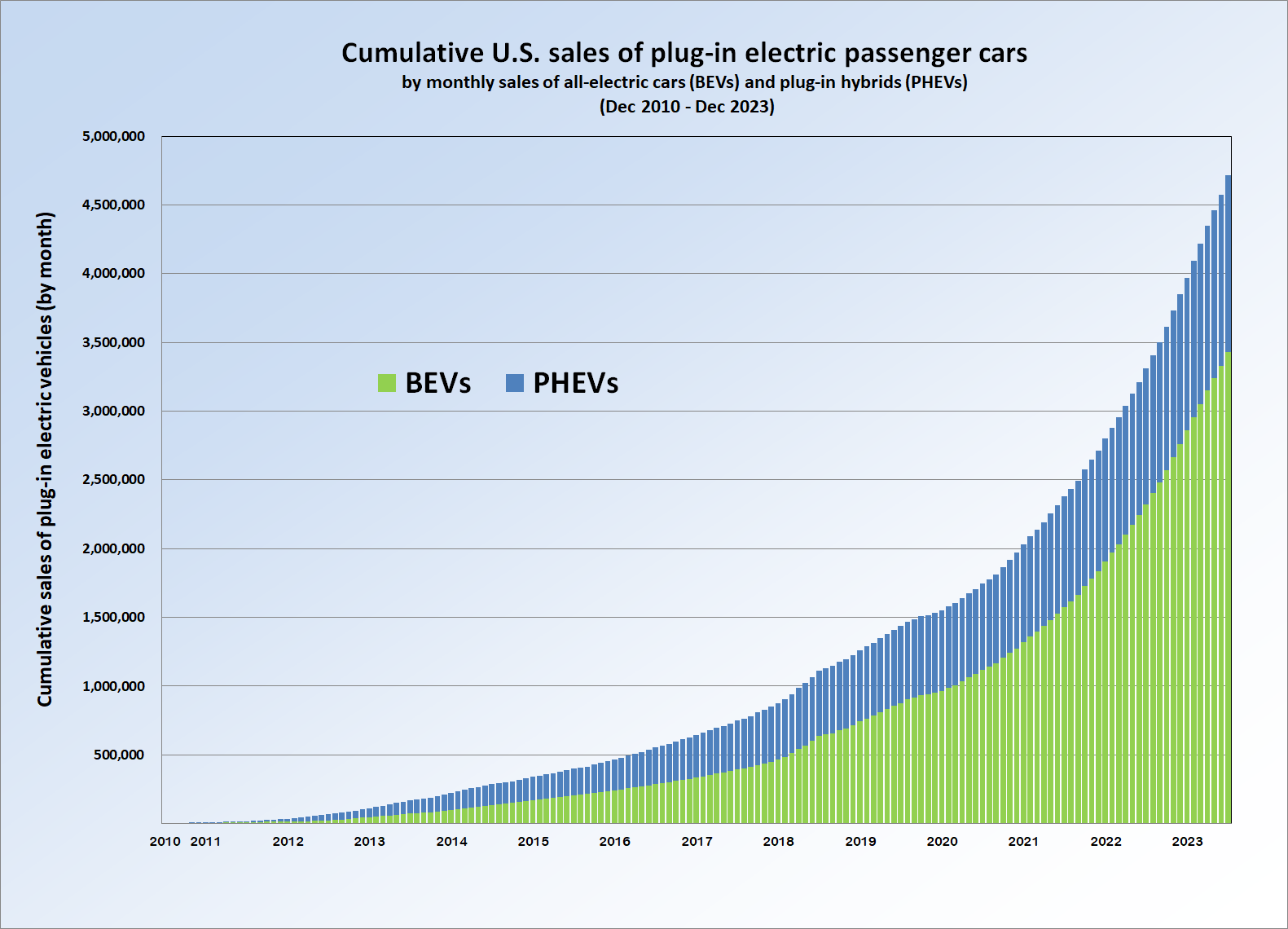
U.S. cumulative monthly sales of plug-in cars from December 2010 up December 2023, showing the evolution of the split between all-electric cars (BEVs) and plug-in hybrids (PHEVs).

As of December 2014, cumulative sales of plug-in electric vehicles in the U.S. since December 2010 were led by plug-in hybrids, with 150,946 units sold representing 52.7% of all plug-in car sales, while 135,444 all-electric cars (47.3%) had been delivered to retail customers. During 2015, the all-electric segment grew much faster, with a total of 72,303 all-electric cars sold, up 6.6% year-on-year, while plug-in hybrid were down 22.4% year-on-year, with 42,959 units sold. These results reversed the trend, and as of December 2015, a total of 206,508 all-electric cars and 193,904 plug-in hybrids have been sold since 2010, with all-electrics now representing 51.6% of cumulative sales. The lead of battery electric cars continued in 2016, with 84,246 all-electrics sold, up 18.4% from 2015, representing 53.6% of the plug-in segment 2016 sales, while sales of plug-in hybrids totaled 72,935 unis, up 69.1% from 2015. As of August 2016, the distribution of cumulative sales since 2010 between these two technologies is 52.8% all-electrics and 47.2% plug-in hybrids.

==== Sales growth ====
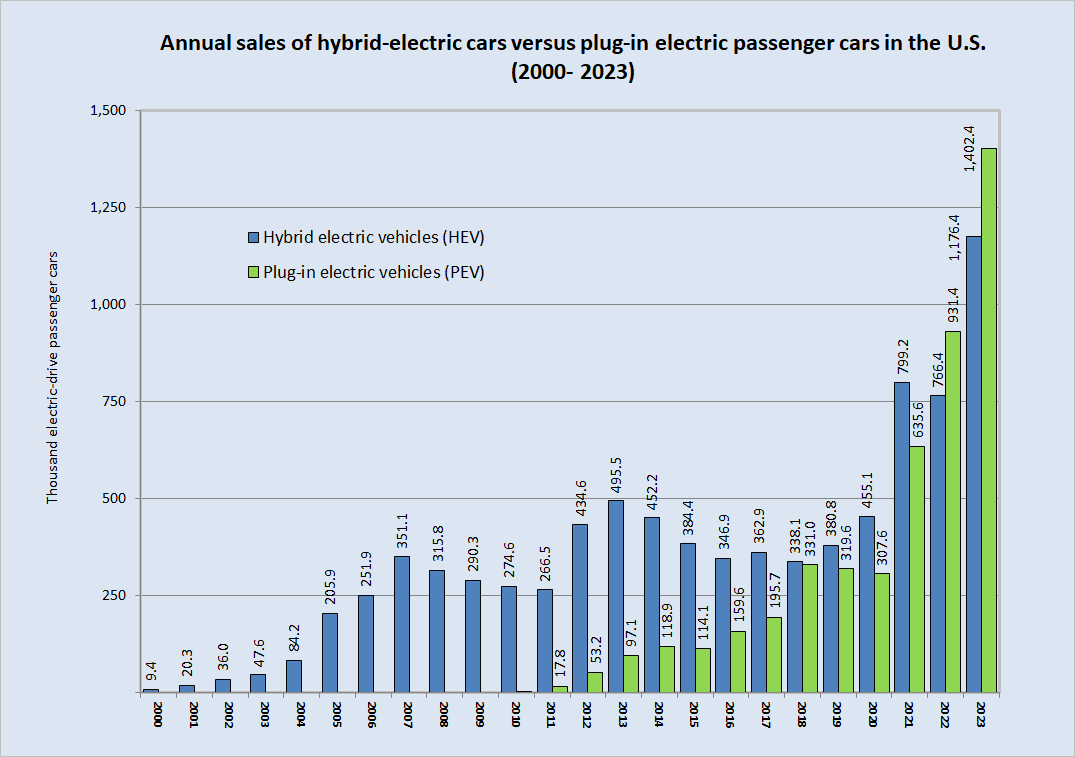
Comparison of annual sales of passenger hybrid electric and plug-in electric vehicles in the U.S. between 2000 and 2023.

Sales of series production plug-in cars during its first two years in the U.S. market were lower than the initial expectations. Cumulative plug-in electric car sales since 2008 reached the 250,000 units in August 2014, 500,000 in August 2016, and the one million goal was achieved in September 2018.

According to the U.S. Department of Energy, combined sales of plug-in hybrids and battery electric cars are climbing more rapidly and outselling by more than double sales of hybrid-electric vehicles over their respective 24 month introductory periods, as shown in the graph at the right.

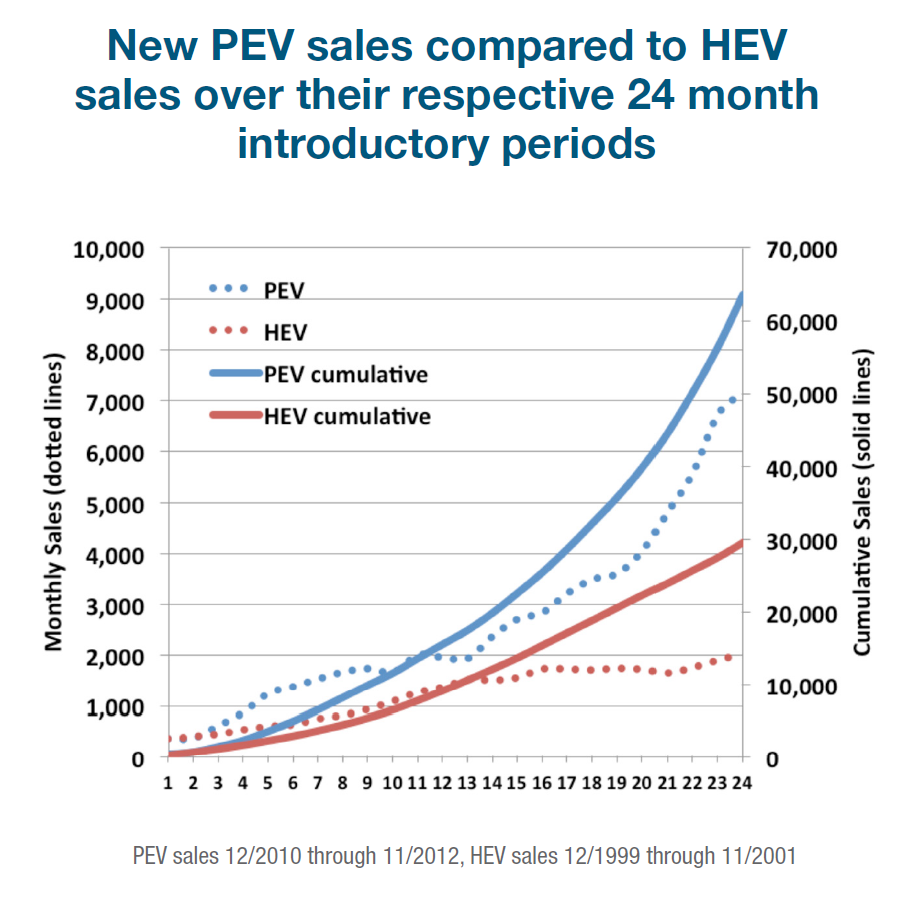
Cumulative sales of new PEVs are doing better than sales of HEVs in the United States over their respective 24 month introductory periods.

A more detailed analysis by the Office of Energy Efficiency and Renewable Energy over the same two-year introductory periods found that except for the initial months in the market, monthly sales of the Volt and the Leaf have been higher than the Prius HEV, and the Prius PHEV has outsold the regular Prius during its 8 months in the market. Over the first 24 months from introduction, the Prius HEV achieved monthly sales of over 1,700 in month 18, the Leaf achieved about 1,700 units in month 7, the Prius PHEV achieved nearly 1,900 sales in month 8, and the Volt achieved more than 2,900 sales in month 23. A 2016 analysis by the Consumer Federation of America (CFA) found that 5 years after its introduction, sales of plug-in electric cars in the U.S. continued to outsell conventional hybrids. The analysis considered sales between January 2011 and December 2015.

An analysis by Scientific American found a similar trend at the international level when considering the global top selling PEVs over a 36-month introductory period. Monthly sales of the Volt, Prius PHV and Leaf are performing better than the conventional Prius during their respective introductory periods, with the exception of the Mitsubishi i-MiEV, which has been outsold most of the time by the Prius HEV over their 36-month introductory periods.

==== Key market features ====
According to Experian, leasing of plug-in cars instead of purchasing is dominant in the American market, with leasing accounting for nearly 60% of all new all-electric cars, compared with just 25% of all cars in 2025.

All plug-in electric vehicle models depreciate more rapidly than conventionally powered cars and trucks, with the average plug-in electric vehicle depreciating at a rate of 57.2% over five years. Plug-in hybrids depreciate less than all-electric cars but still depreciate slightly faster than conventionally powered cars.

Polling from the Pew Research Center showed that of those who were interested in buying or bought a plug-in electric vehicle, 72% of respondents cited "helping the environment" and 70% cited "saving money on gas" as to why they were interested or bought a plug-in electric vehicle.

==== Car dealers' reluctance to sell ====
With the exception of Tesla, Rivian, and Lucid, almost all new cars in the United States are sold through dealerships, so they play a crucial role in the sales of electric vehicles, and negative attitudes can hinder early adoption of plug-in electric vehicles. Dealers decide which cars they want to stock, and a salesperson can have a big impact on how someone feels about a prospective purchase.

There are several reasons for the reluctance of some dealers to sell plug-in electric vehicles. PEVs do not offer car dealers the same profits as gasoline-powered cars. Plug-in electric vehicles take more time to sell because of the explaining required, which hurts overall sales and sales people commissions. Electric vehicles also may require less maintenance, resulting in loss of service revenue, and thus undermining the biggest source of dealer profits, their service departments. According to the National Automobile Dealers Association (NADS), dealers on average make three times as much profit from service as they do from new car sales.

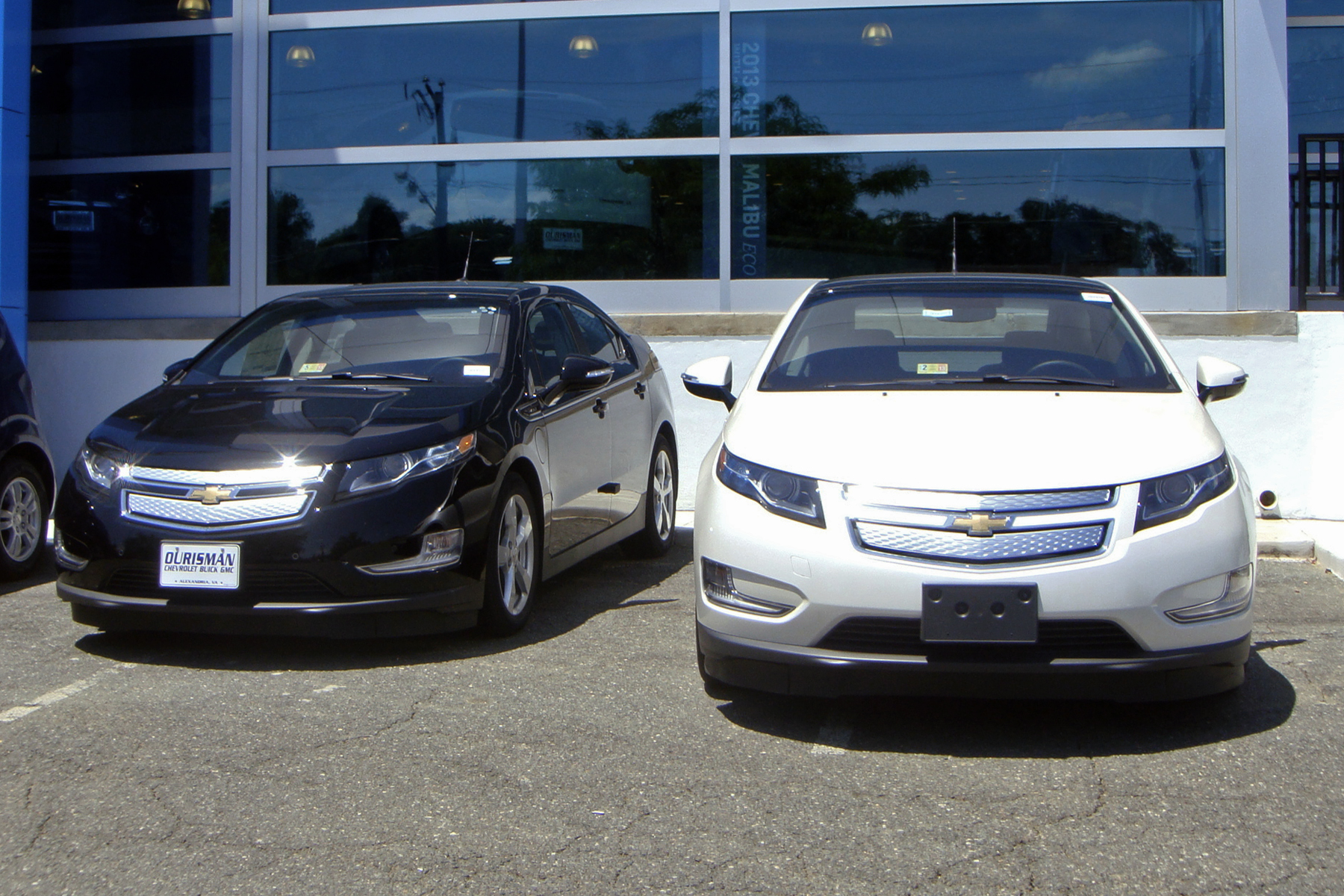
Car dealerships can play a role in the sales of plug-in electric vehicles. Shown is a Chevrolet dealership exhibiting first-generation Volts.

In 2014 Consumer Reports published results from a survey conducted with 19 secret shoppers that went to 85 dealerships in four states. The secret shoppers asked a number of specific questions about cars to test the salespeople's knowledge about electric cars. The consumer magazine decided to conduct the survey after several consumers who wanted to buy a plug-in car reported to the organization that some dealerships were steering them toward gasoline-powered models. The survey found that not all sales people seemed enthusiastic about making PEV sales; a few outright discouraged it, and even one dealer was reluctant to even show a plug-in model despite having one in stock. And many sales people seemed not to have a good understanding of electric-car tax breaks and other incentives. Consumer Reports also found that when it came to answering basic questions, sales people at Chevrolet, Ford, and Nissan dealerships tended to be better informed than those at Honda and Toyota. The survey found that most of the Toyota dealerships visited recommended against buying a Prius Plug-in and suggested buying a standard Prius hybrid instead. Overall, the secret shoppers reported that only 13 dealers "discouraged sale of EV," with seven of them being in New York. However, at 35 of the 85 dealerships visited, the secret shoppers said sales people recommended buying a gasoline-powered car instead.

=== Regional markets ===
==== Concentration relative to population ====
As of July 2016, the U.S. average concentration was 1.51 plug-in cars registered per 1,000 people, while California's concentration was 5.83 registrations per 1,000 people. At the time, only Norway exceeded California's plug-in concentration per capita, by 3.69 times. As of December 2017, the average national ownership per capita rose to 2.21 plug-ins per 1,000 people.

In 2017 eight states had more than two plug-in vehicles registered per 1,000 people, of which, three are located in the West Coast. California had the highest concentration with 8.64 plug-ins per 1,000 people. Hawaii ranked second (5.12) followed by Washington (4.06), Oregon (3.84) Vermont (3.73), Colorado (2.33), Arizona (2.29), and Maryland (2.03). Mississippi (0.20), Arkansas (0.28), West Virginia (0.30), Louisiana (0.31), Wyoming (0.37), and North Dakota (0.39) had the lowest concentration of plug-in cars in 2017. In terms of growth from 2016 to 2017 for plug-in vehicle registrations per capita, five states had growth rates of 50% or higher: Vermont (56.4%) Maryland (54.2%), Massachusetts (52.5%), New Hampshire (50.2%), and Alaska (50.0%). The U.S. average growth rate from 2016 to 2017 was 30.2%.

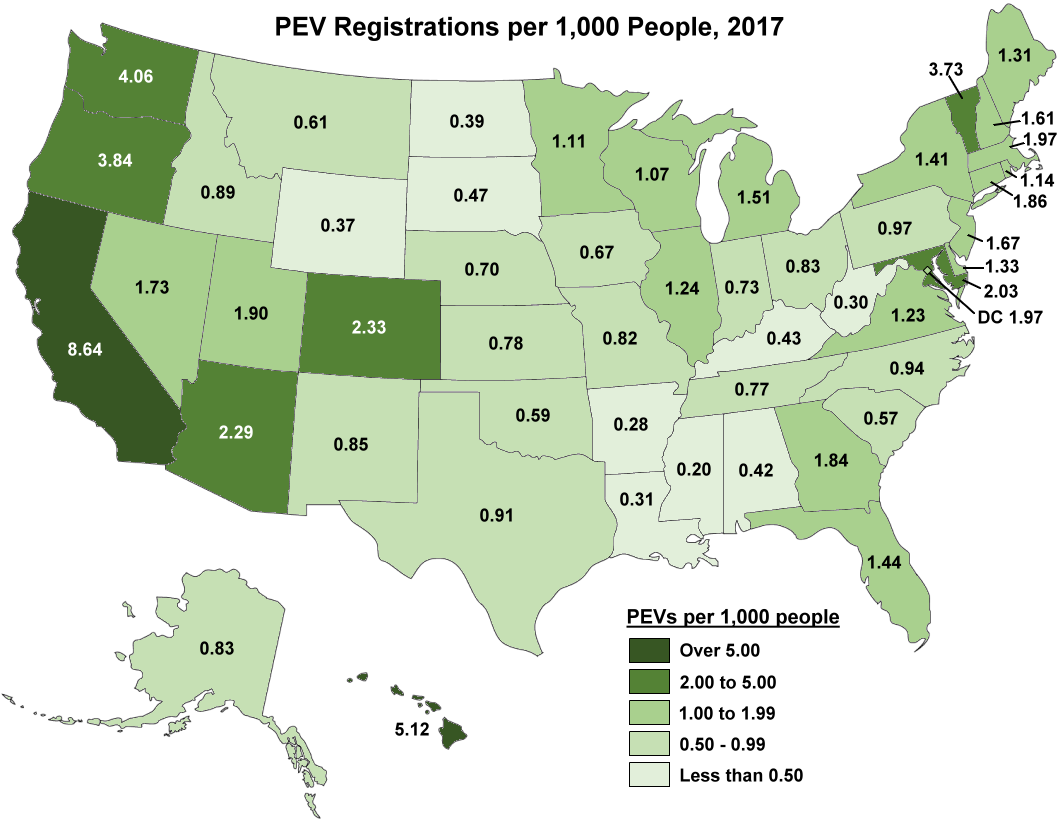
U.S. plug-in electric vehicle registrations per 1,000 people by state in 2017. California had the highest concentration of PEVs with 8.64 plug-in cars per 1,000 people.

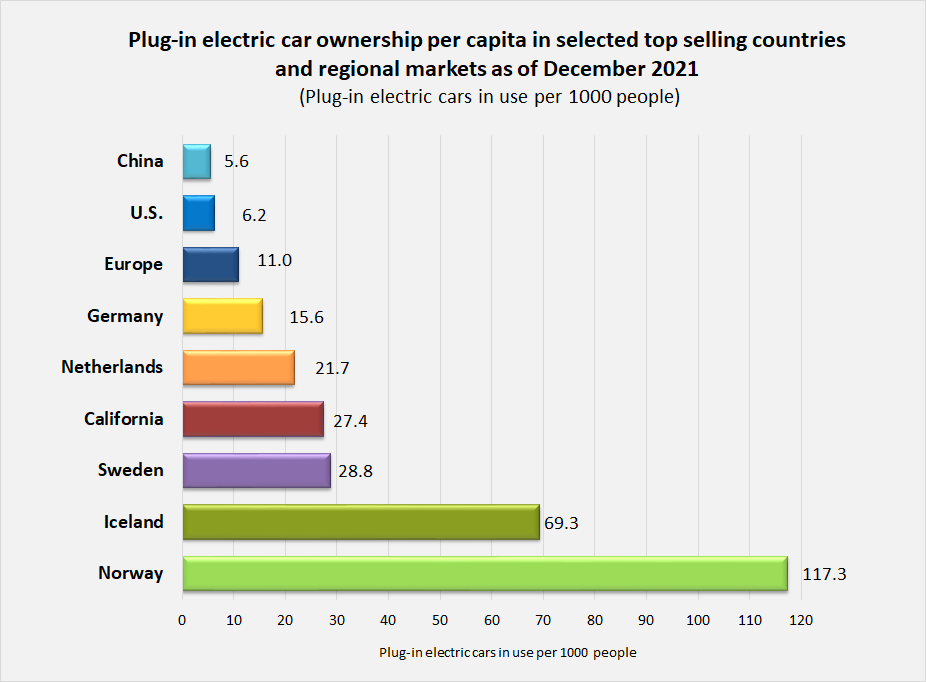
Comparison of ownership of plug-in electric cars per 1,000 people among top selling PEV countries and California in 2021

==== Market share by city and state ====
The following table summarizes the ten states and metropolitan areas leading all-electric car adoption in terms of their market share of new light-vehicle registrations or sales during 2013 and 2014.

Top ten selling all-electric vehicle (BEV) states and metropolitan areas by market share of new car sales
Rank; 2014^{(1)}	State	Market share^{(2)} 2014 CYTD^{(1)}	Rank; 2013	State	Market share^{(2)} 2013	Rank	Metro area	Market share 2013-2014^{(3)}
1	Georgia	1.60%	1	Washington	1.40%	1	San Francisco-Oakland-San Jose	3.33%
2	California	1.41%	2	California	1.28%	2	Atlanta	2.15%
3	Washington	1.13%	3	Hawaii	1.21%	3	Seattle-Tacoma	1.83%
4	Hawaii	1.04%	4	Georgia	0.94%	4	Honolulu	1.71%
5	Oregon	0.67%	5	Oregon	0.89%	5	Monterey-Salinas	1.51%
6	Utah	0.31%	6	Washington, D.C.	0.52%	6	San Diego	1.34 %
7	Colorado	0.27%	7	Colorado	0.33%	7	Santa Barbara-Santa Maria-San Luis Obispo	1.29%
8	Arizona	0.20%	8	Utah	0.31%	8	Portland	1.25%
9	Tennessee	0.19%	9	Tennessee	0.28%	9	Los Angeles	1.08%
10	Connecticut	0.19%	10	Illinois	0.25%	10	Eugene	0.86%
U.S. average		0.32%				0.38%		
Notes: (1) CYTD: current year-to-date sales as of 30 June 2014 (2) New all-electric vehicle (BEV) registrations as % of total new registrations of light-vehicles only. (3) Sales of new all-electric vehicles as % of total new light-vehicle sales between April 2013 and March 2014.

A total of 52% of American plug-in electric car registrations from January to May 2013 were concentrated in five metropolitan areas: San Francisco (19.5%), Los Angeles (15.4%), Seattle (8.0%), New York (4.6%) and Atlanta (4.4%). From January to July 2013, the three cities with the highest all-electric car registrations were all located in California, Atherton and Los Altos in the Silicon Valley, followed by Santa Monica, located in Los Angeles County.

=== Sales by model ===
As of October 2026, there were 73 highway legal plug-in electric cars available in the American market for retail sales. Most sales were concentrated to a few models, with the top 10 best selling plug-in cars accounting for about 84% of total sales during the first eleven months of 2018. Car manufacturers are offering plug-in electric cars in the U.S. for retail customers include Audi, BMW, Cadillac, Chevrolet, Fiat, Ford, Honda, Hyundai, Kia, Lucid, Mercedes-Benz, MINI, Nissan, Polestar, Porsche, Rivian, Tesla, Toyota, Volkswagen, and Volvo.

As of October 2026, the top selling plug-in car manufacturers in the American market are Tesla with 386,194 units delivered, GM with 82,152, Rivian with 41,009, Hyundai with 39,121, Toyota with 34,759, and Ford with 22,653.

==== Top selling models ====
The Tesla Model Y has been the U.S. best selling plug-in car since 2021

The Nissan Leaf was the U.S. top selling plug-in car in 2011 (9,674), and the Chevrolet Volt topped sales in both 2012 and 2013 with 23,461 and 23,094 units sold each year. In 2014, the Nissan Leaf retook the sales lead, with 30,200 units sold.

The Tesla Model S was the best selling plug-in car for three years straight from 2015 to 2017 with 25,202 units delivered in 2015, 29,156 units delivered in 2016, and 26,500 units delivered in 2017.

The Tesla Model 3 was the best selling plug-in car for three years straight from 2018 to 2020 with an estimated 139,782 units delivered in 2018, 158,925 units delivered in 2019, and 95,135 units delivered in 2020.

Since 2021, the Tesla Model Y has been the best selling electric vehicle in the U.S. with over 1.5 million units delivered since 2021.

==== Neighborhood electric vehicles ====
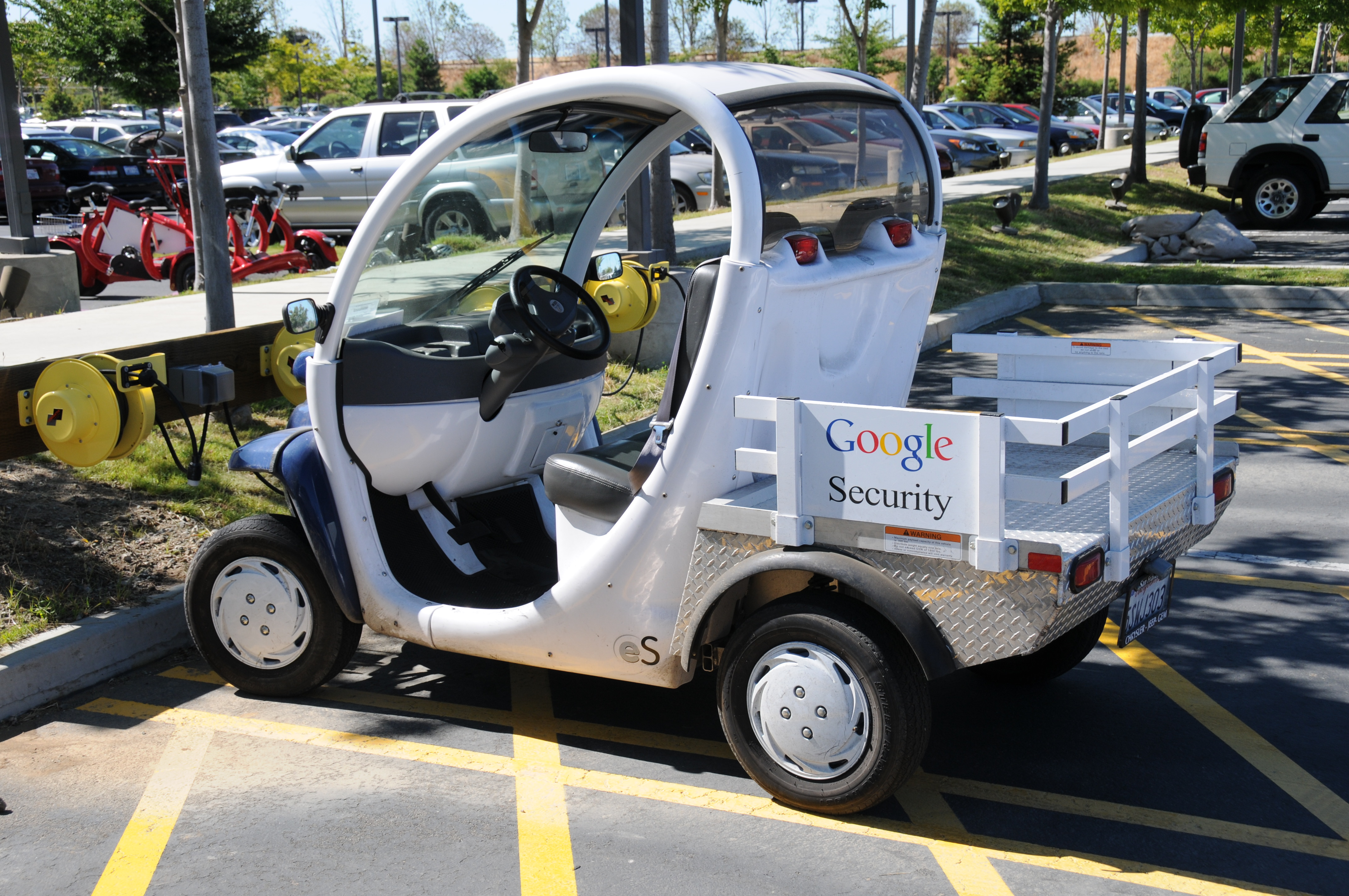
The GEM is the best selling low-speed neighborhood electric vehicle in the U.S.

Low-Speed Vehicles (LSVs) are defined as "four-wheeled motor vehicles whose top speed is 20 to 25 mph (32 to 40 km/h) to be used in residential areas, planned communities, industrial sites, and other areas with low density traffic, and low-speed zones." LSVs, more commonly known as neighborhood electric vehicles (NEVs), were defined in 1998 by the National Highway Traffic Safety Administration's Federal Motor Vehicle Safety Standard No. 500, which required safety features such as windshields and seat belts, but not doors or side walls.

Since 1998 Global Electric Motorcars (GEM), the market leader in North America, has sold more than 50,000 GEM battery-electric vehicles worldwide as of October 2015.

== Modern production timeline ==
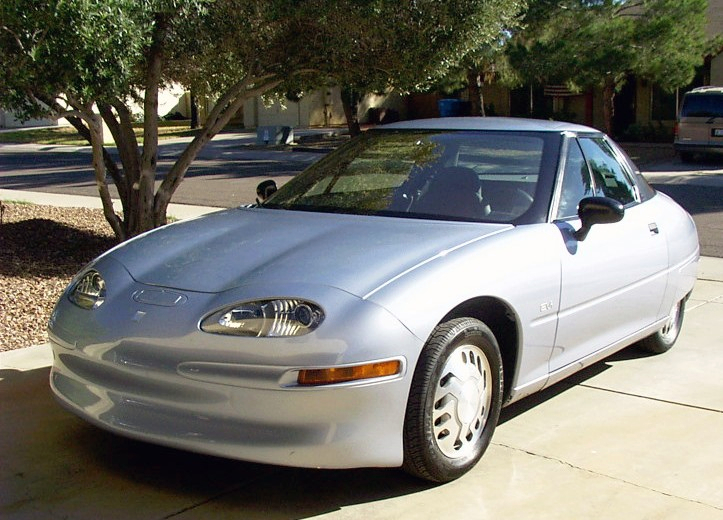
The General Motors EV1 was one of the first PEVs introduced in 1996 as a result of CARB's zero-emissions vehicle mandate.

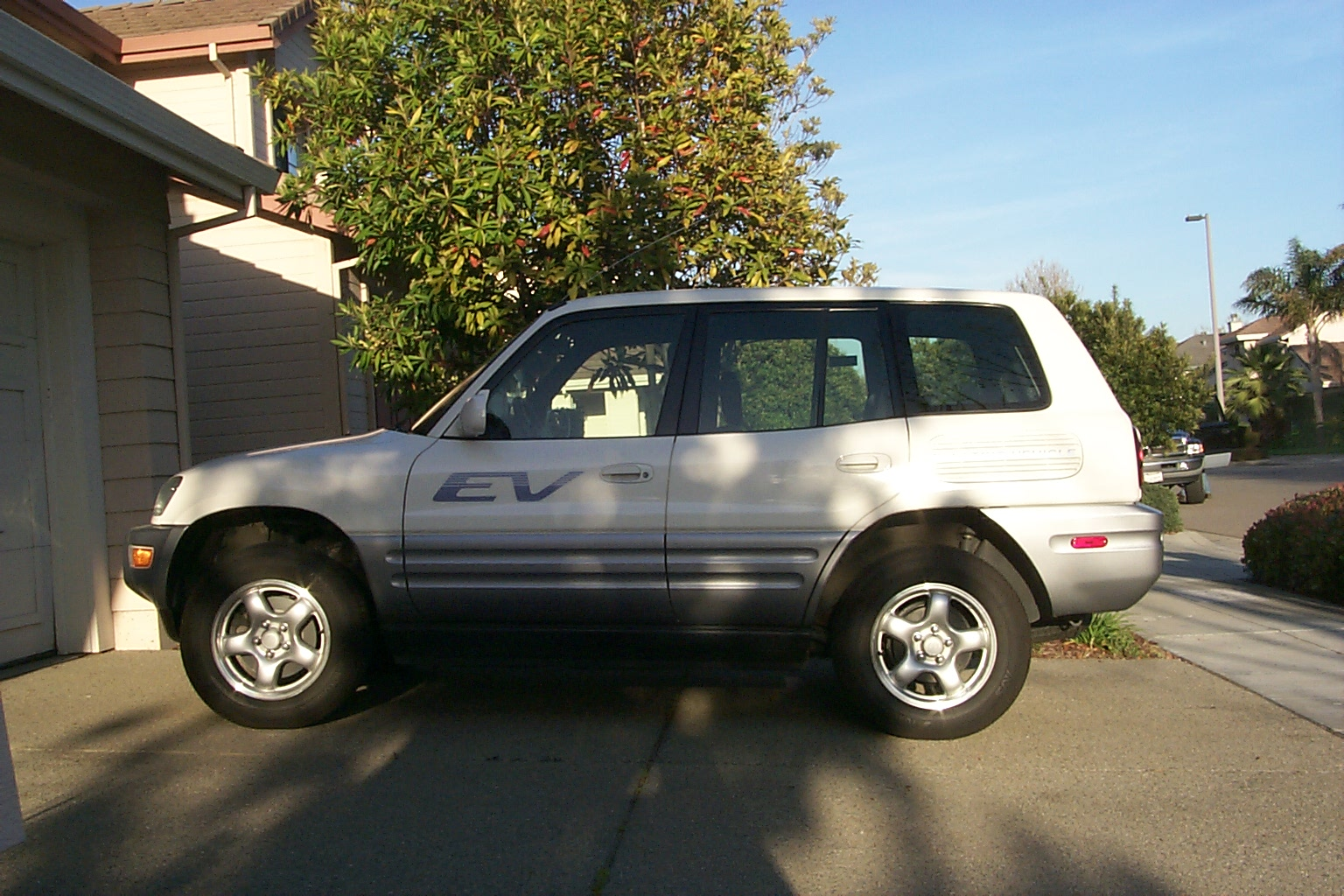
Toyota RAV4 EV (first generation)

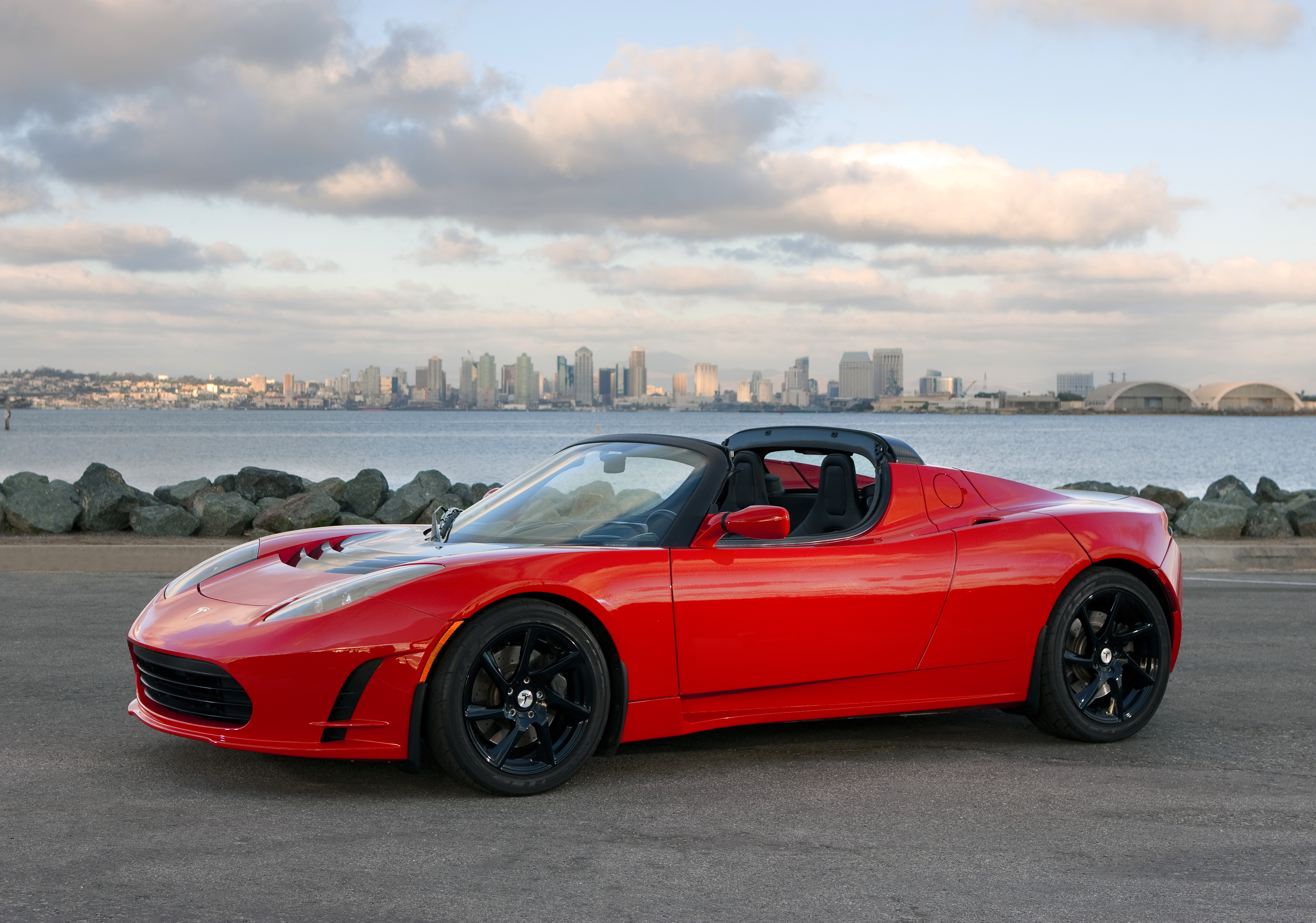
Tesla Roadster (first generation)

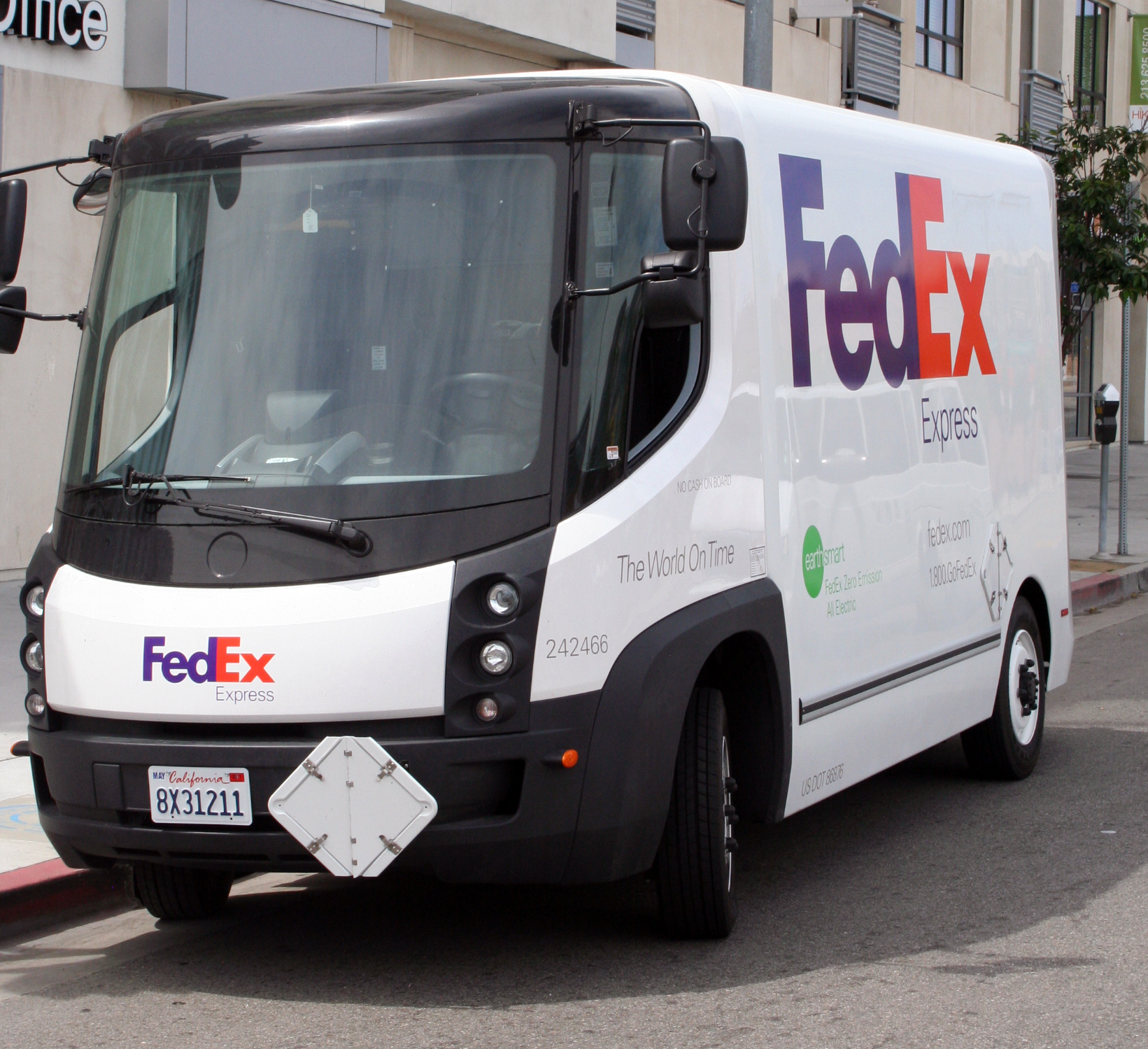
Navistar eStar all-electric van

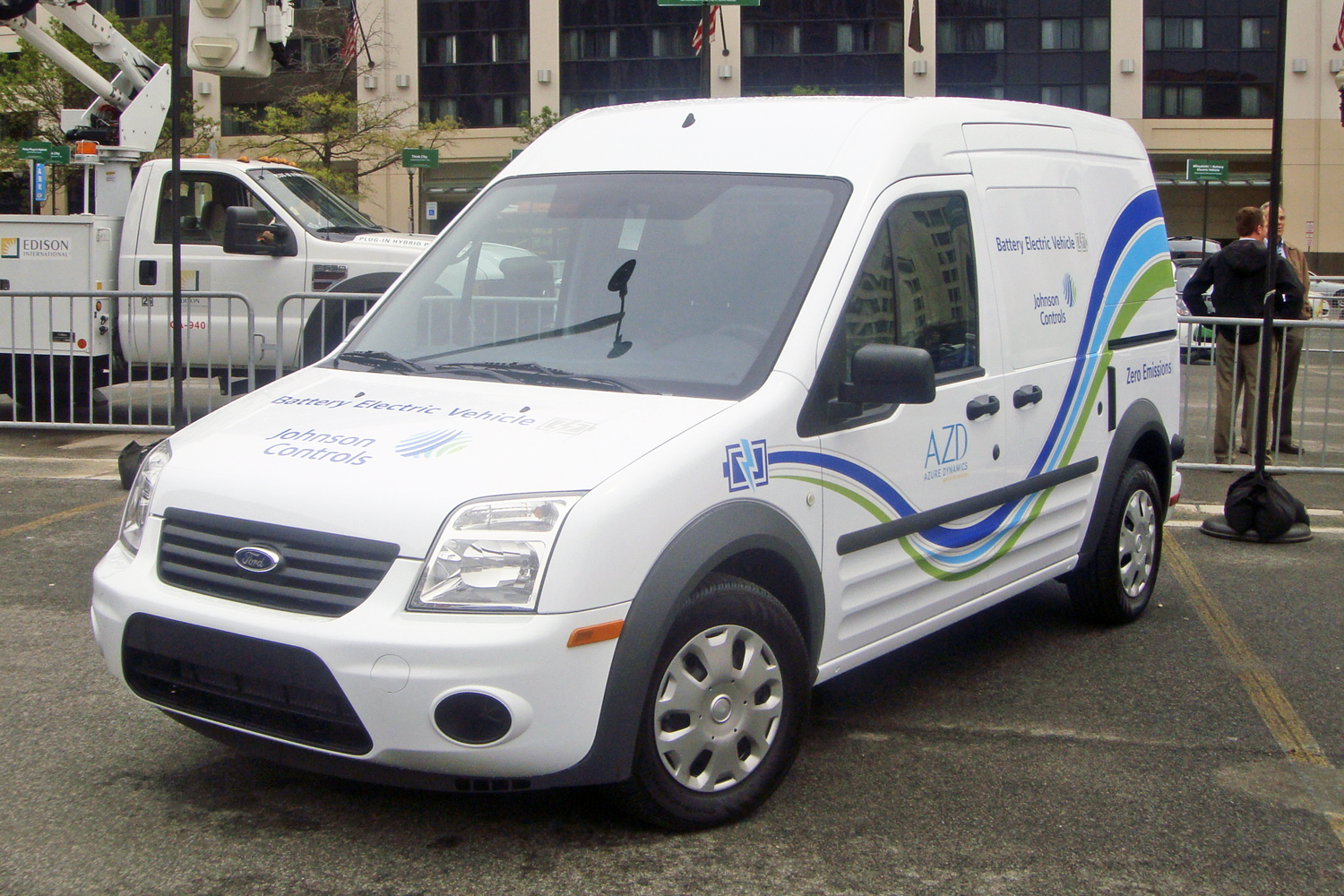
Azure Transit Connect Electric

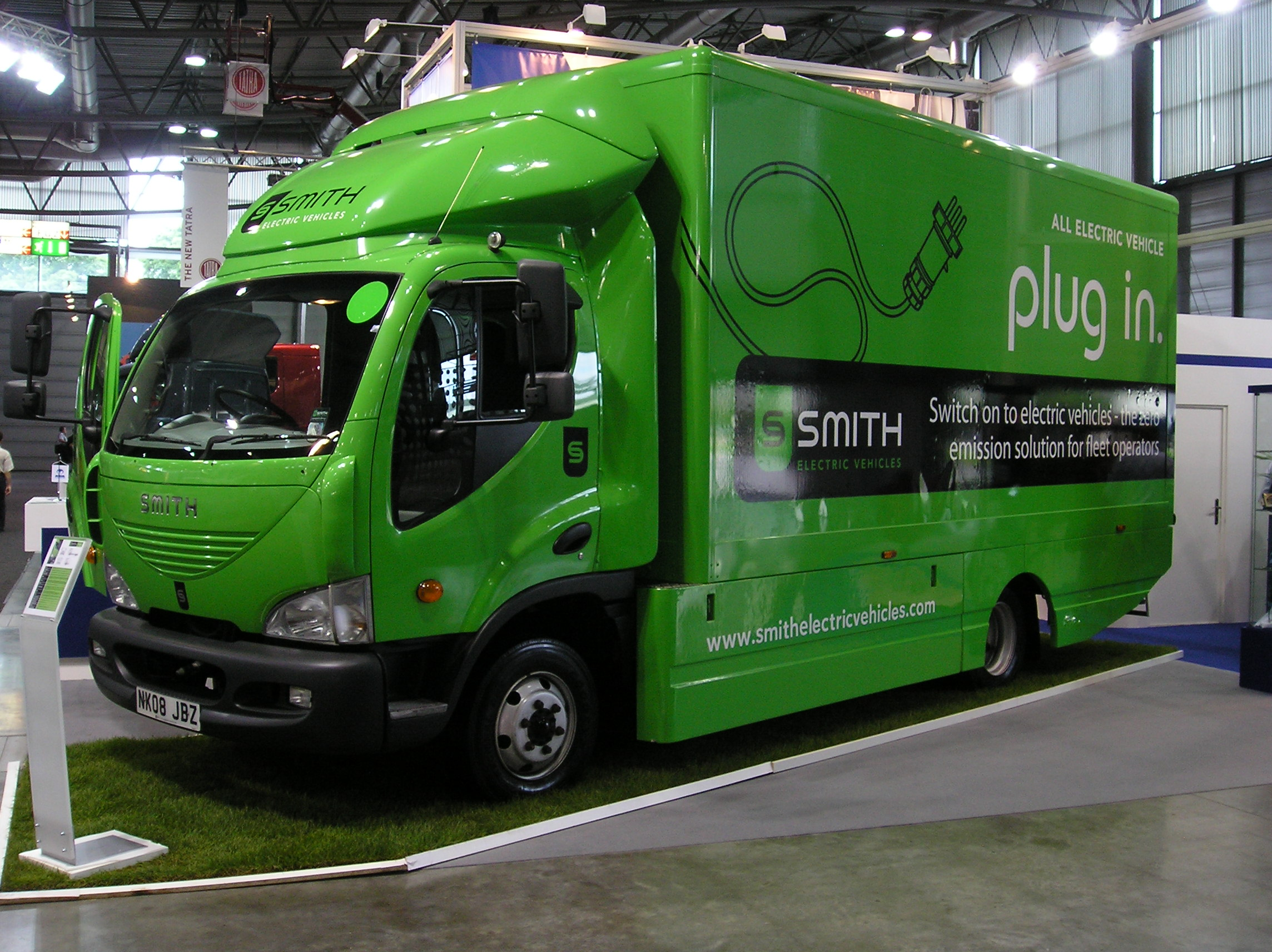
Smith Newton delivery truck

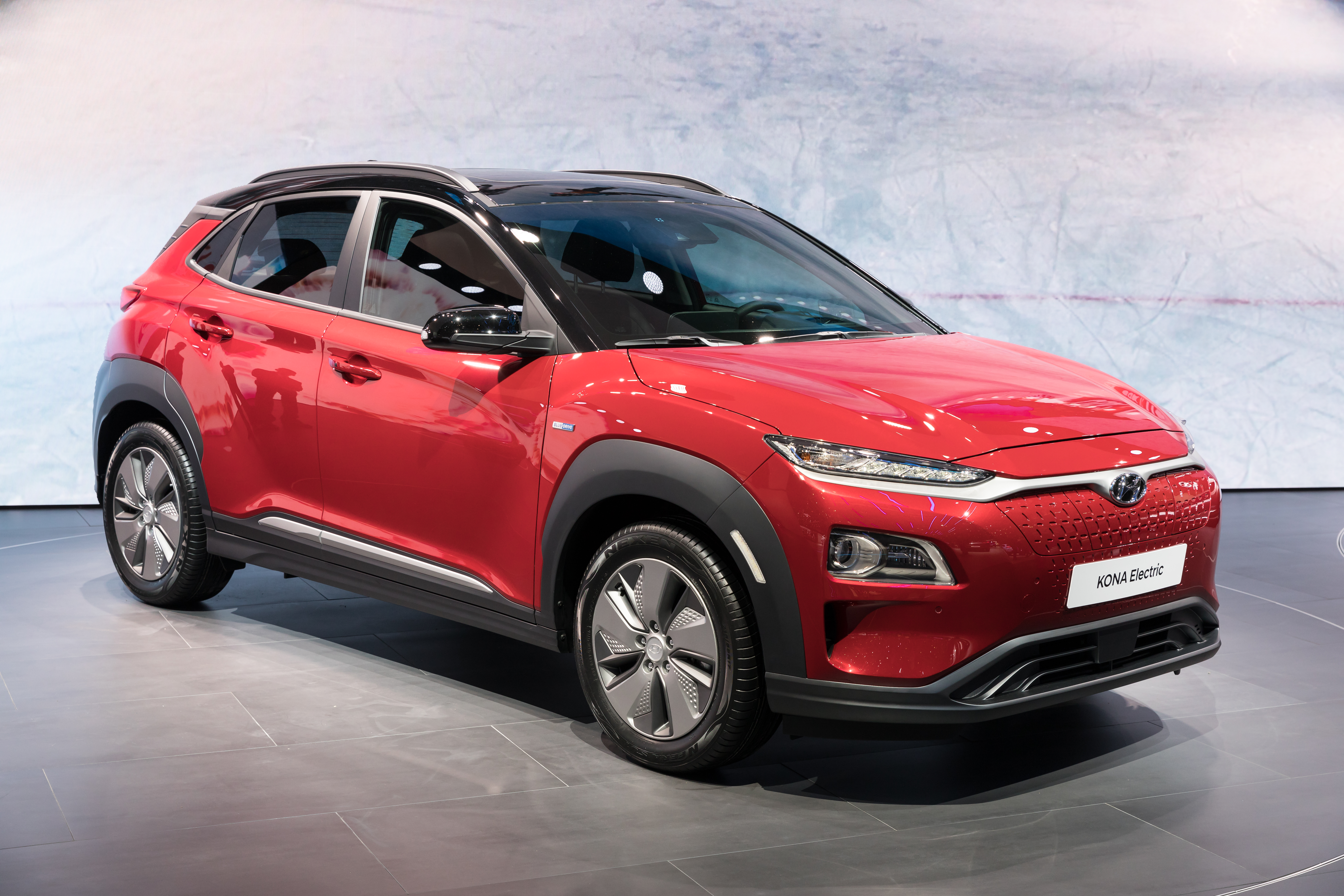
Hyundai Kona Electric

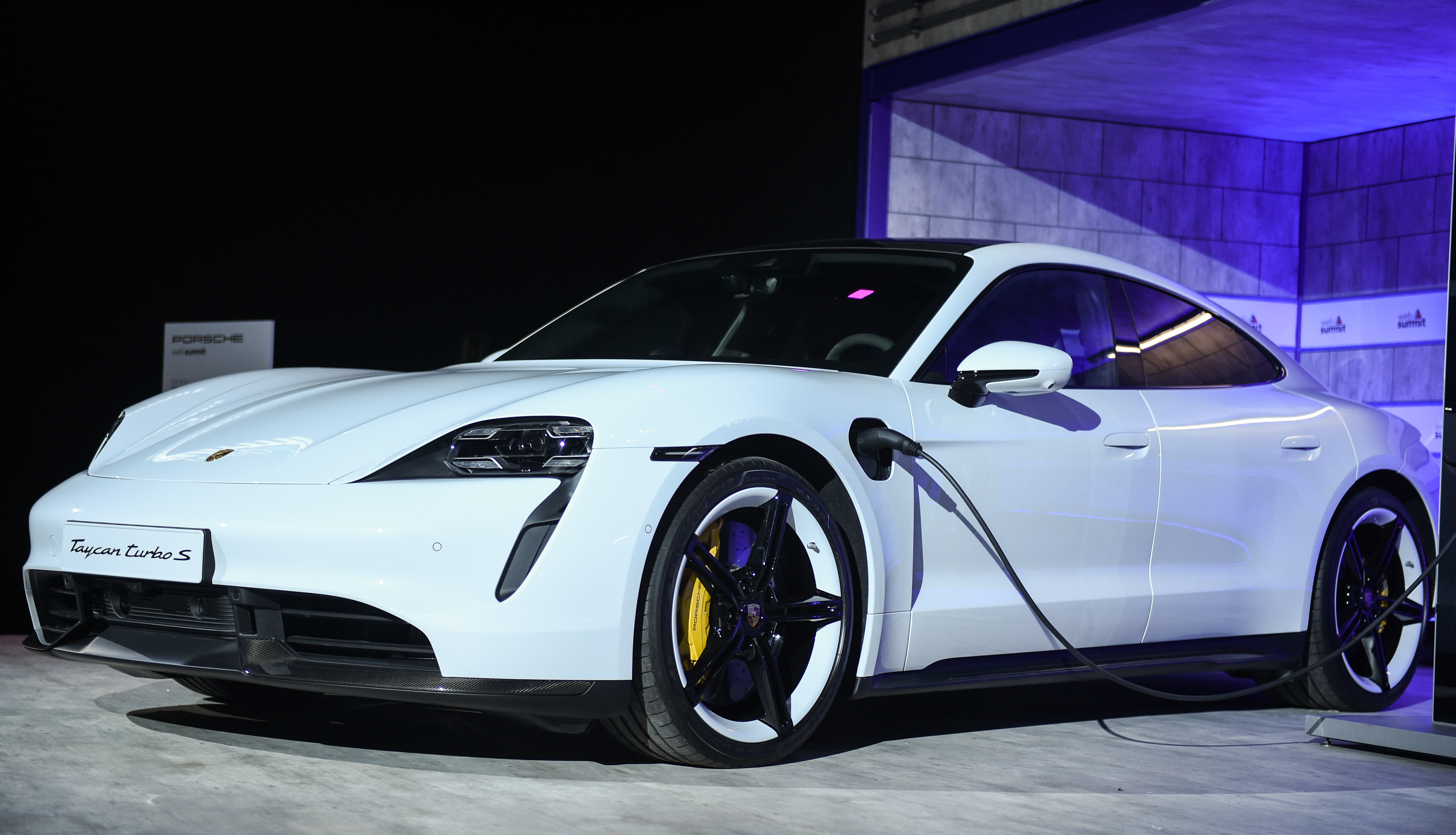
Porsche Taycan

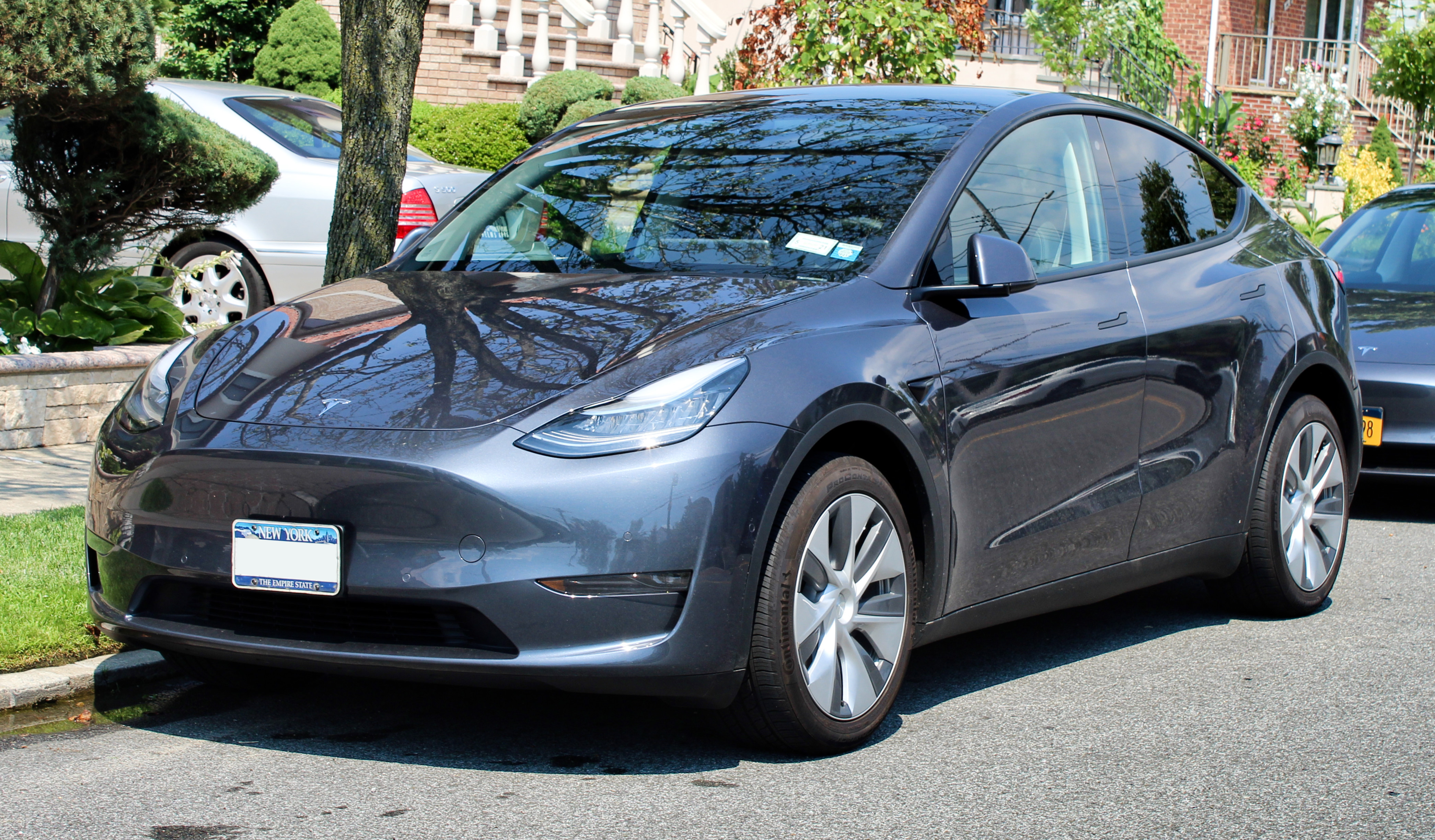
Tesla Model Y

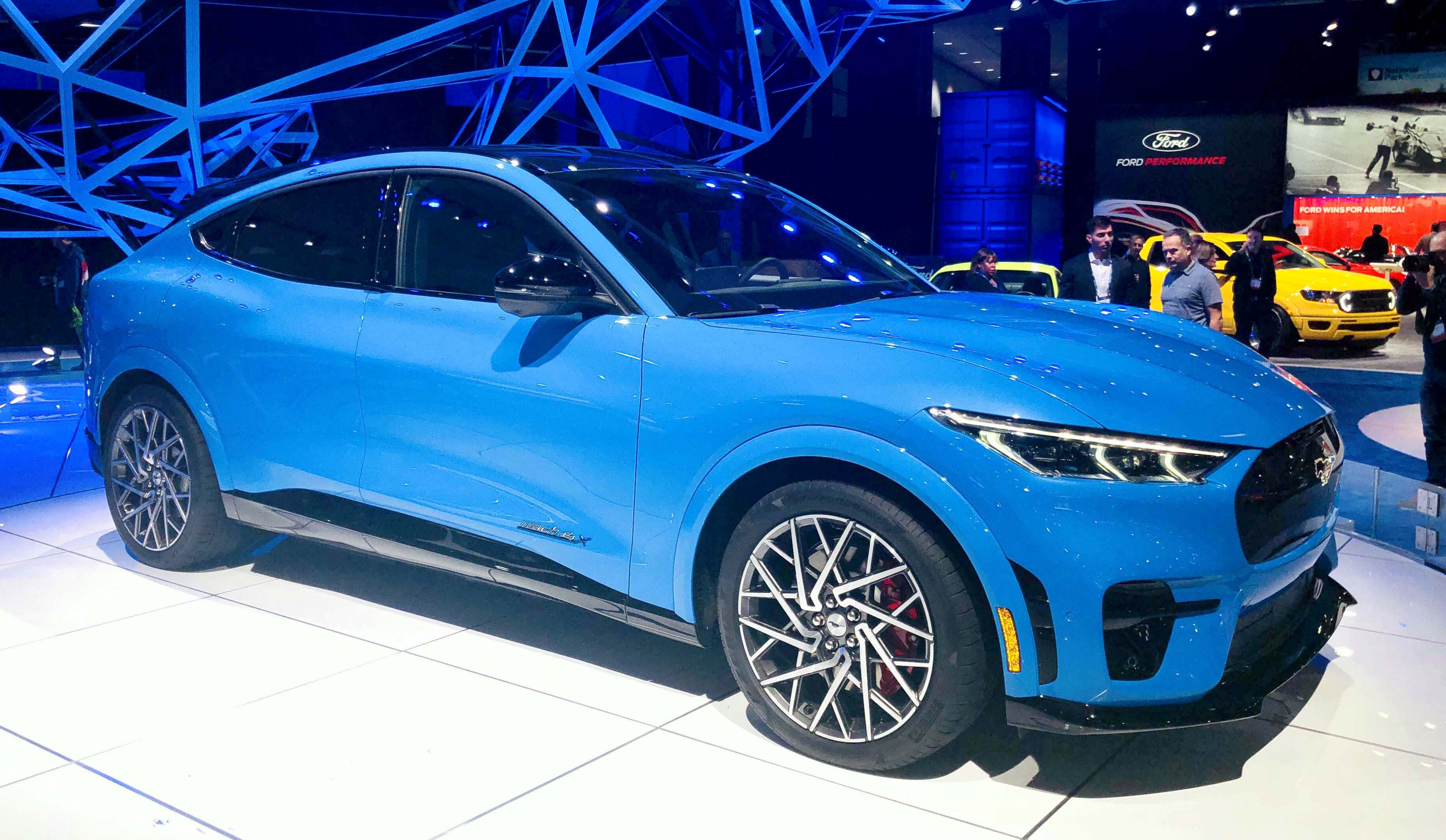
Ford Mustang Mach-E

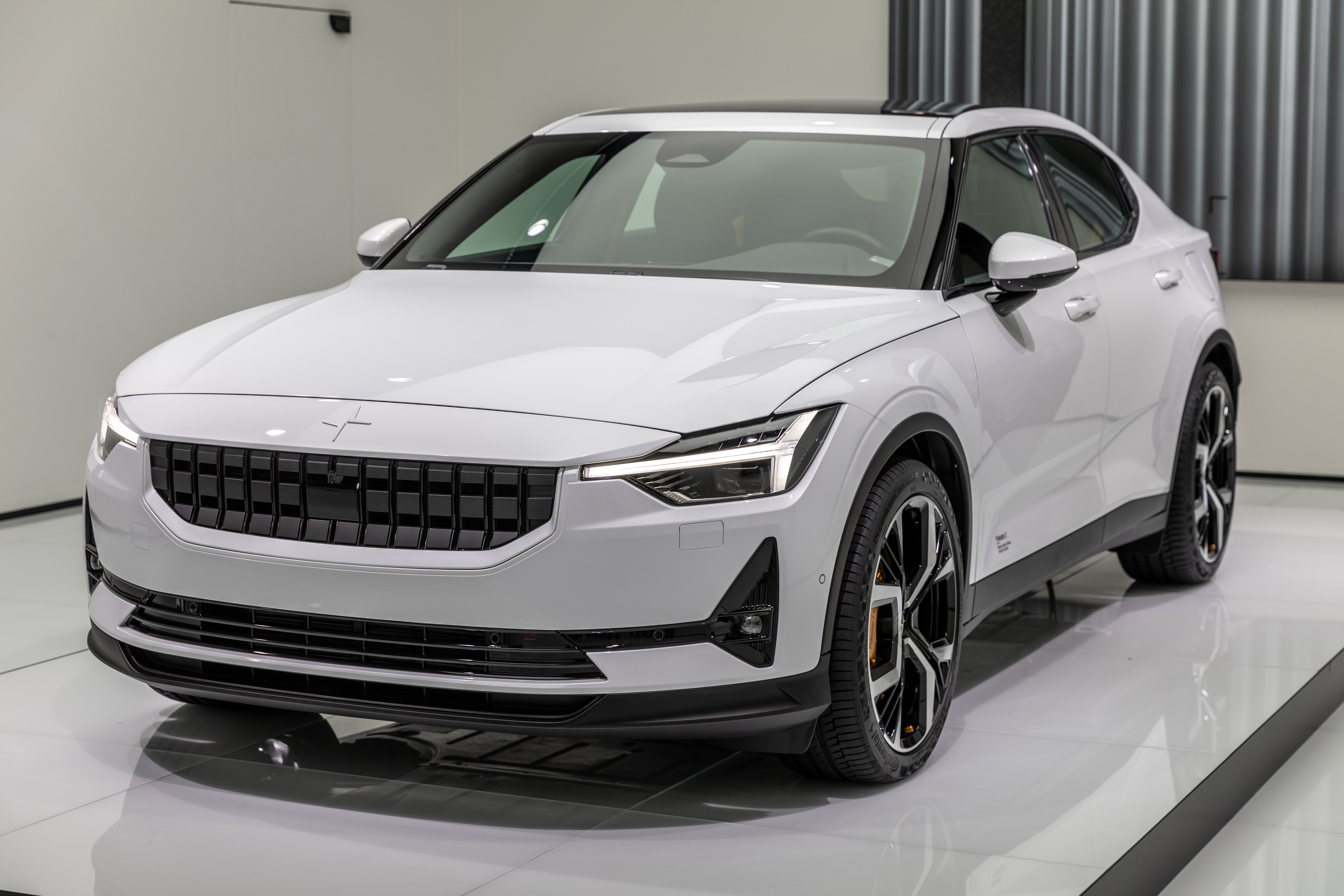
Polestar 2

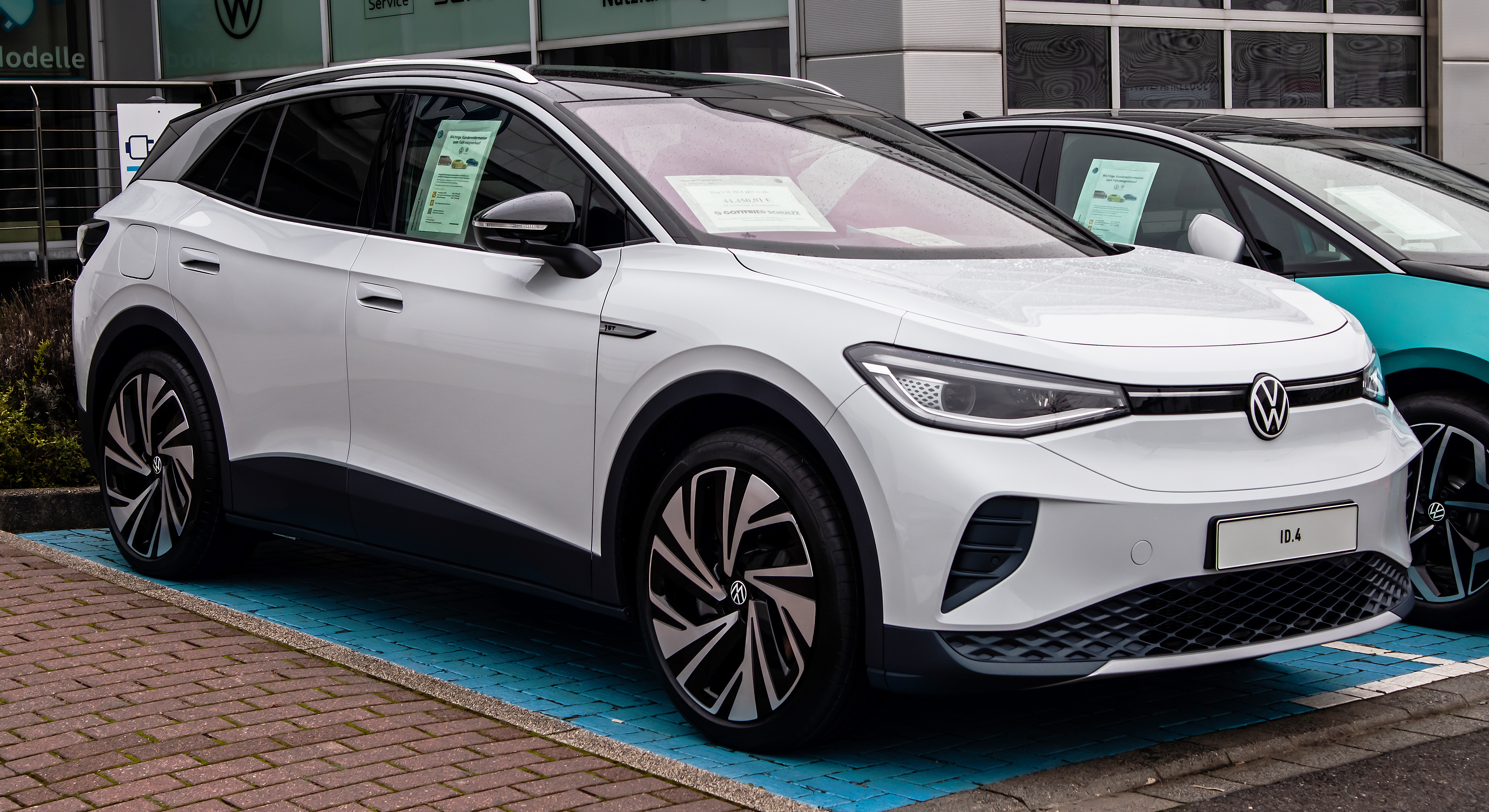
Volkswagen ID.4

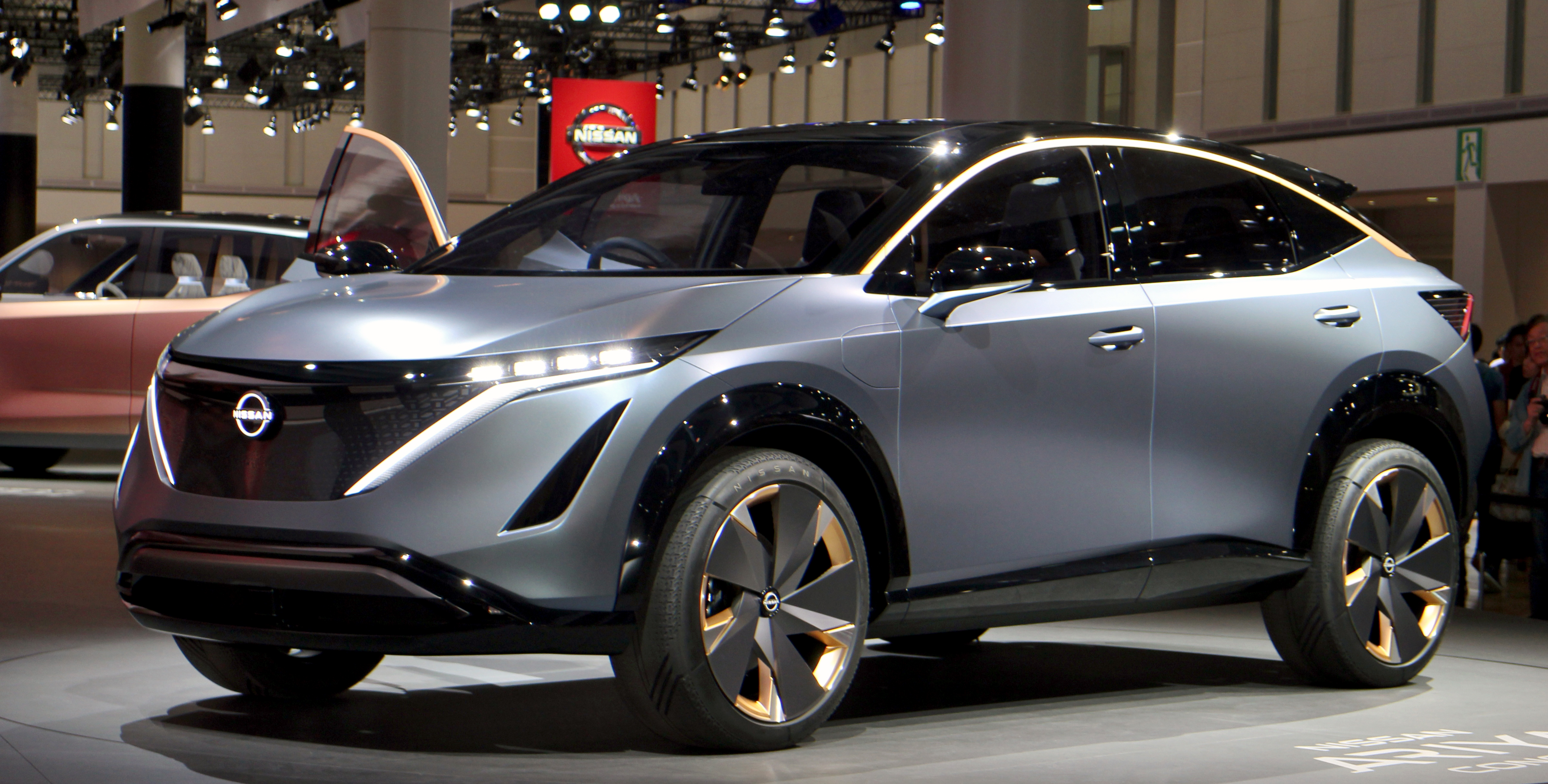
Nissan Ariya

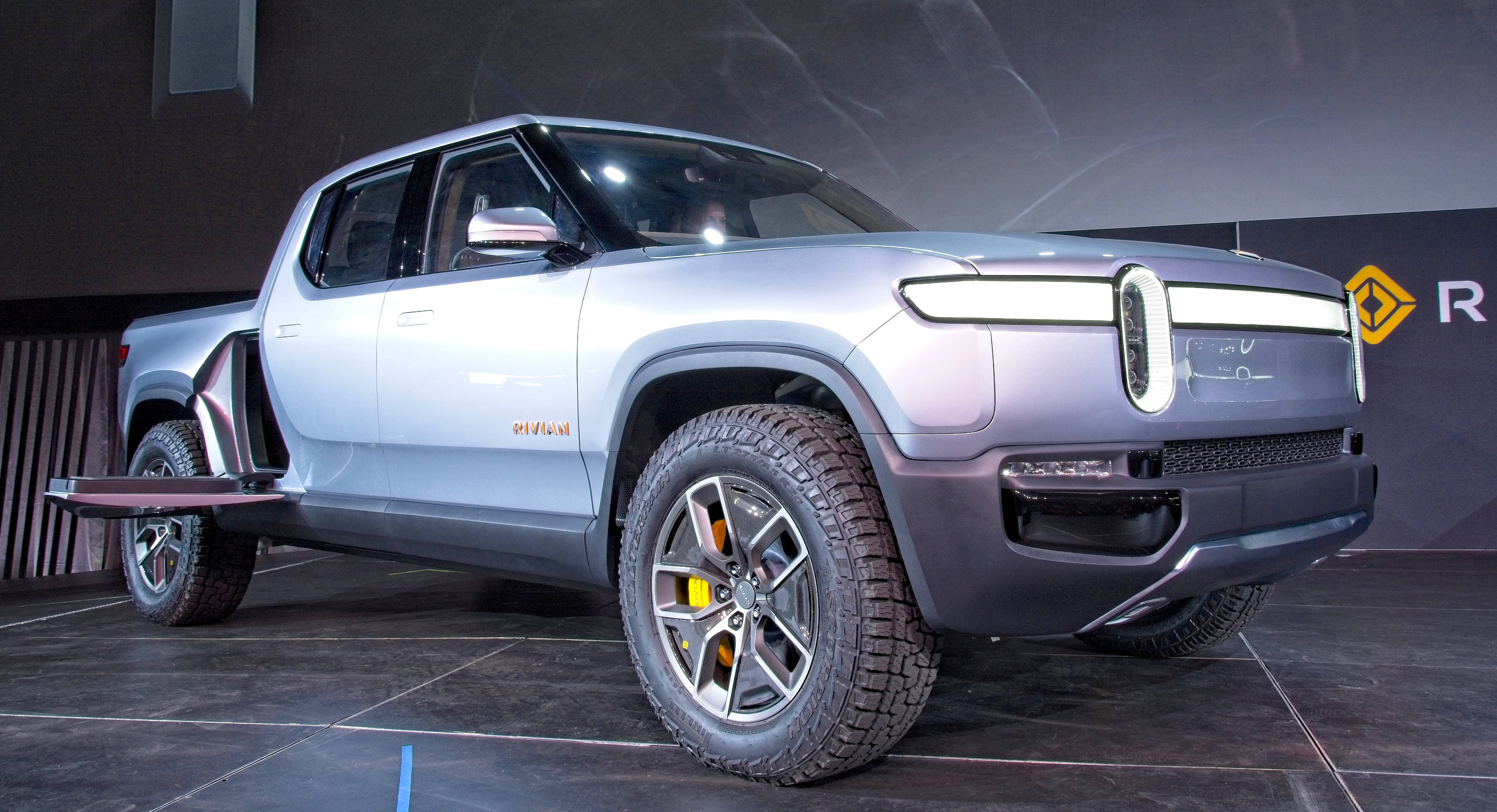
Rivian R1T

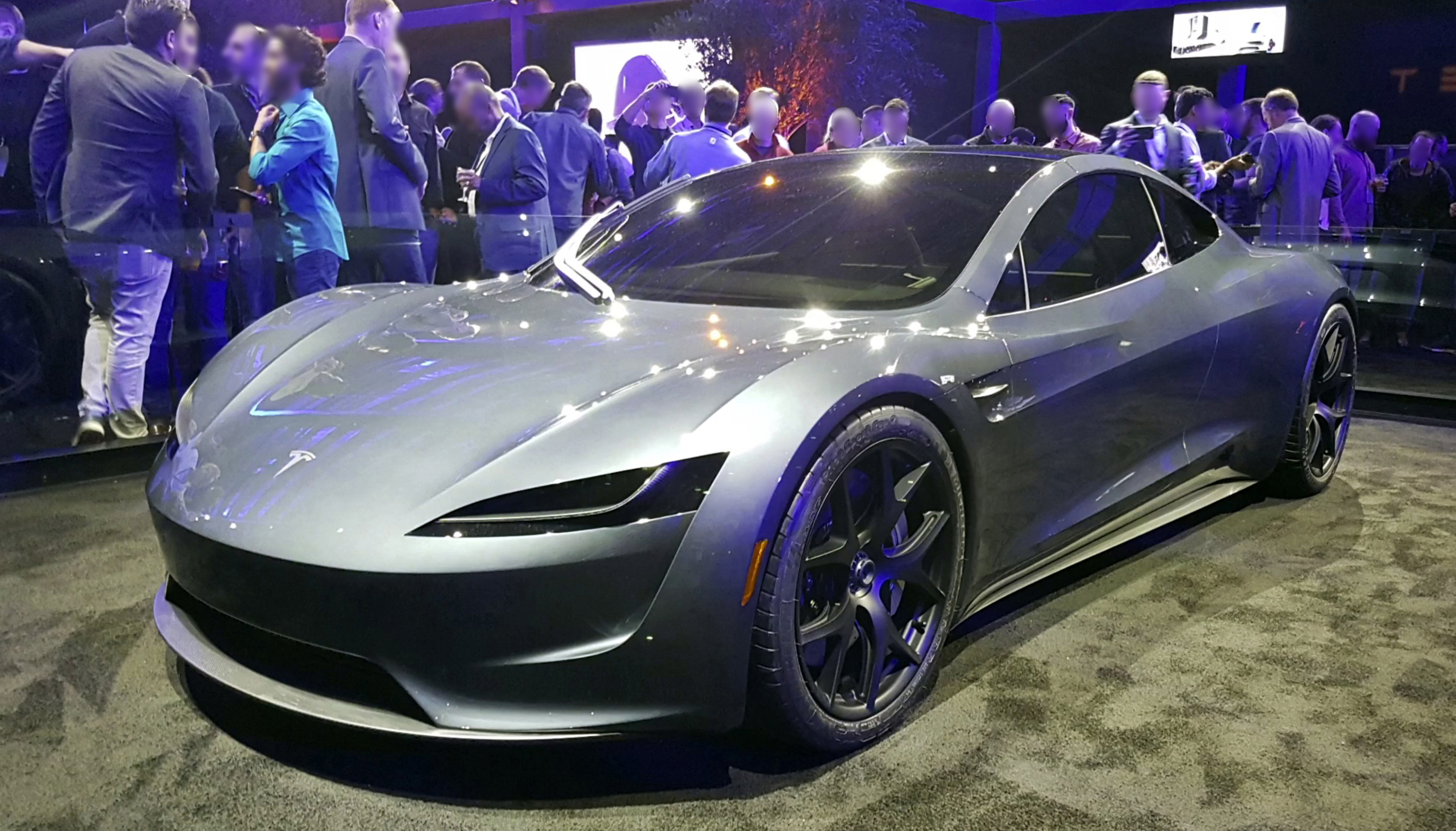
Tesla Roadster (2020)

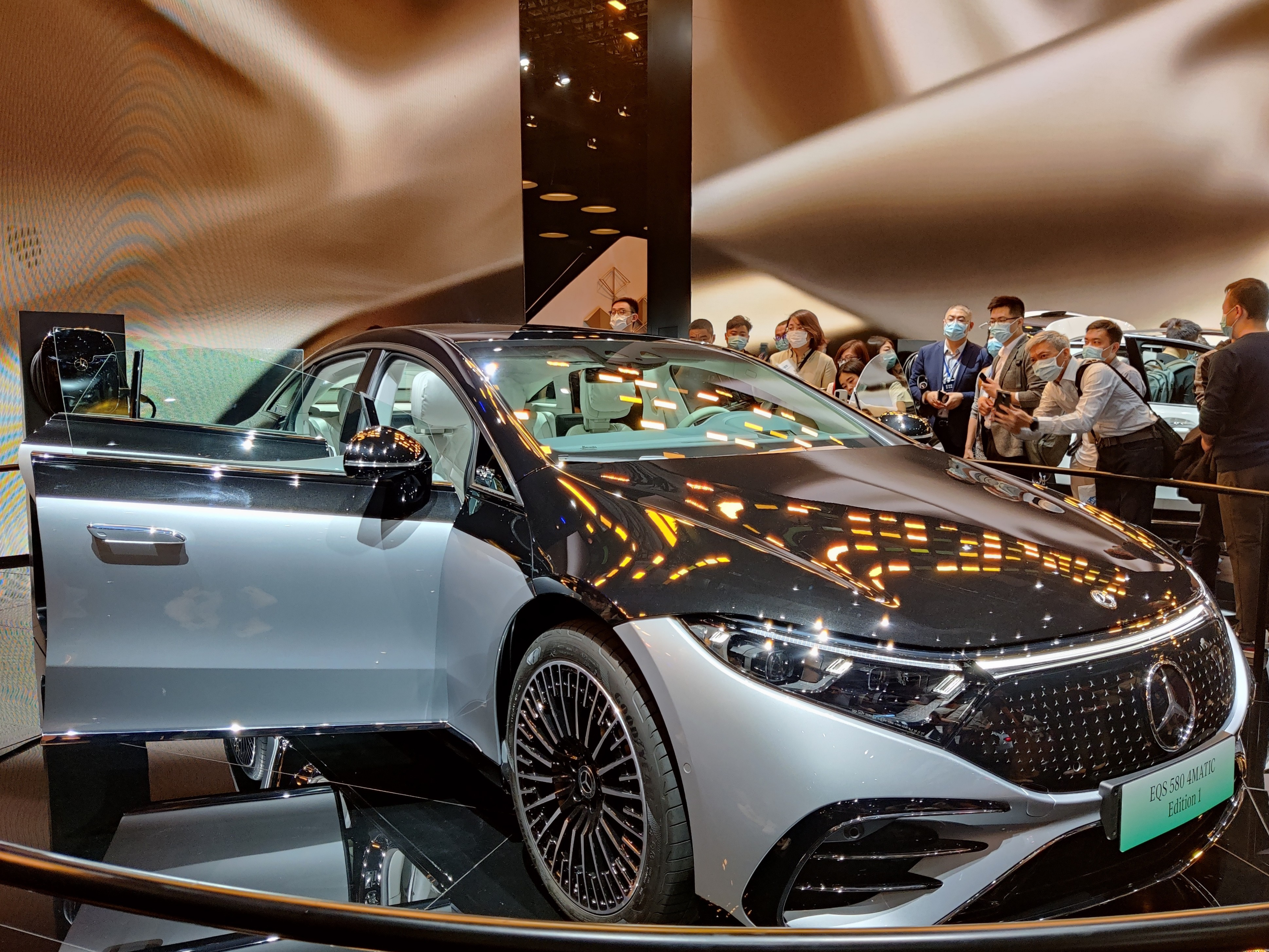
Mercedes-Benz EQS

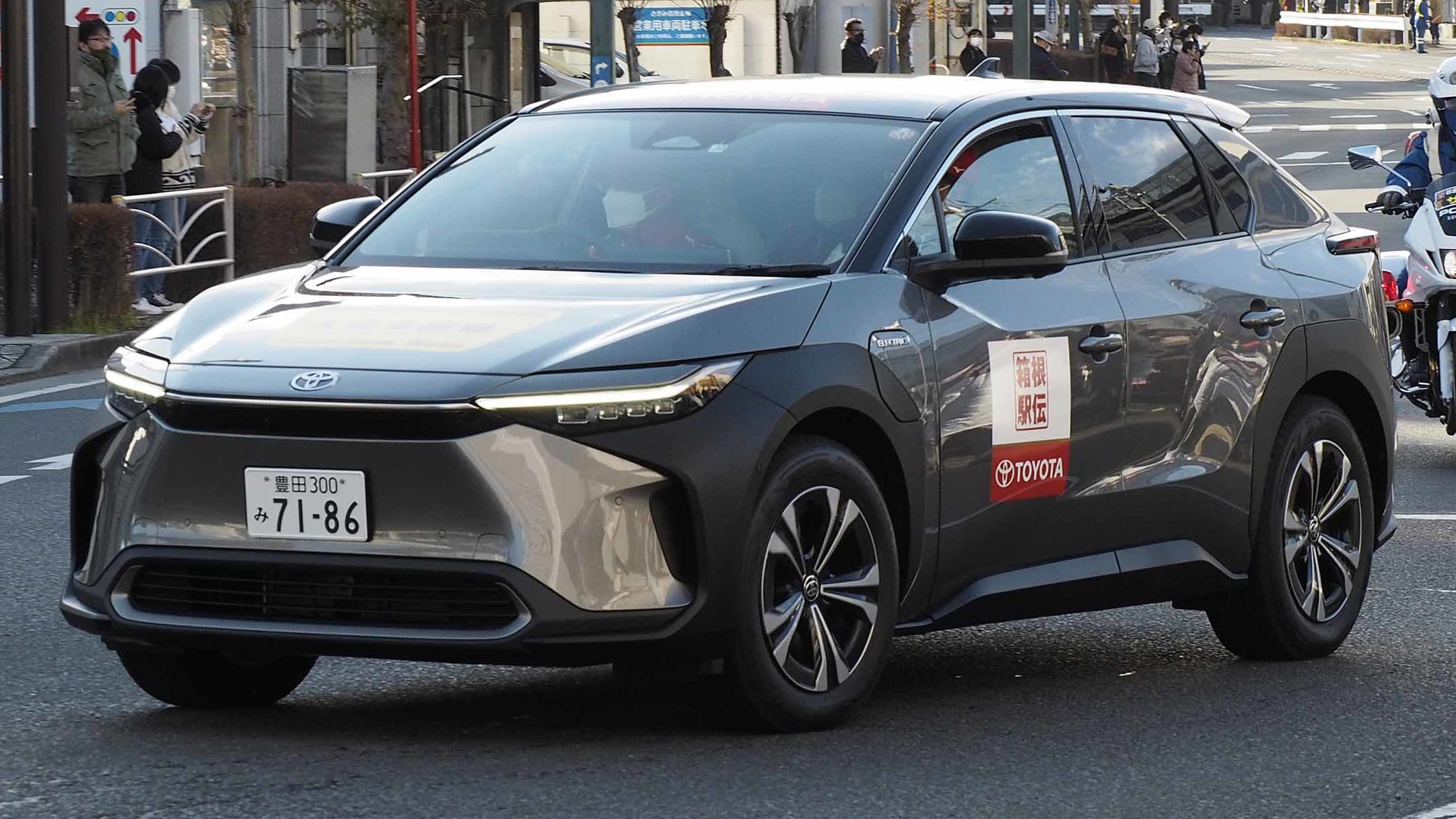
Toyota bZ4X

This is a list of all highway-capable plug-in electric vehicles available for retail customers in the U.S. for sale or leasing since the early 1990s.

=== 1990-2003 ===
- Chrysler TEVan (1993-1995)
- General Motors EV1 (1996-2003)
- Toyota RAV4 EV (1997-2003)
- Honda EV Plus (1997-1999)
- Nissan Altra (1998-2001)
- Dodge Caravan EPIC (1999 to 2001)
- Ford TH!NK City (1999-2003)

=== 2008-2016 ===
- Tesla Roadster (2008-2011)
- Mini E (demonstration program ended in 2011)
- Chevrolet Volt (production ended in 2019)
- Nissan Leaf
- Navistar eStar utility van (production ended in 2013)
- Th!nk City (production ended in 2012)
- Smart ED 2nd gen (available for leasing only)
- Wheego Whip LiFe (no longer in production)
- Fisker Karma (production ended in 2012)
- Azure Transit Connect Electric delivery van (no longer in production)
- Mitsubishi i (Mitsubishi i MiEV in the rest of the world)
- Smith Newton delivery truck
- BMW ActiveE (demonstration program ended in 2014)
- Coda (no longer in production)
- Ford Focus Electric (limited production)
- Toyota Prius PHV (production ended in 2015)
- Boulder DV-500 (limited production)
- Amp Electric Vehicles (SUV and light truck conversions)
- Tesla Model S (production ended in 2026)
- Honda Fit EV (limited production)
- Toyota RAV4 EV (2nd gen) (limited production)
- Ford C-Max Energi (production ended in 2018)
- Honda Accord Plug-in Hybrid
- Ford Fusion Energi (production ended in 2020)
- Scion iQ EV (limited production available only for carsharing fleets, not for retail customers)
- Smart electric drive / EQ fortwo (available with battery leasing option, production ended in 2024)
- Chevrolet Spark EV (limited production)
- Fiat 500e (production ended in 2019)
- Porsche Panamera S E-Hybrid
- Cadillac ELR (limited production)
- BMW i3 (production ended in 2022)
- Porsche 918 Spyder (limited edition)
- Mercedes-Benz B-Class Electric Drive (production ended in 2019)
- BMW i8 (production ended in 2020)
- Volkswagen e-Golf (production ended in 2020)
- Kia Soul EV
- Porsche Cayenne S E-Hybrid
- Mercedes-Benz S 500 Plug-in Hybrid
- Volvo XC 90 PHEV
- Tesla Model X (production ended in 2026)
- Bolloré Bluecar (available only for the BlueIndy carsharing fleet - ended in 2020)
- BMW X5 xDrive40e (Replaced with the xDrive50e)
- Hyundai Sonata PHEV
- Audi A3 Sportback e-tron
- Audi Q7 e-tron Quattro
- BMW 330e iPerformance
- Mercedes-Benz GLE 550e Plug-in Hybrid
- Toyota Prius Prime / Prius Plug-In Hybrid (second generation Prius PHEV)
- Chevrolet Bolt EV (production ended in 2023)
- BMW 740e iPerformance
- Mercedes-Benz C 350e Plug-in Hybrid

=== 2017-2026 ===
2017

- Chrysler Pacifica Hybrid
- BMW 530e iPerformance
- Tesla Model 3
- Kia Optima PHEV (production ended in 2019
- Honda Clarity Electric (production ended in 2019)
- Honda Clarity Plug-in Hybrid (production ended in 2021)
- Volvo XC60 Plug-in Hybrid
- Mini Countryman Cooper S E ALL4 (production ended in 2023)
- Hyundai Ioniq Electric (production ended in 2022)
- Cadillac CT6 Plug-in Hybrid
- Volvo S90 T8 Plug-in Hybrid
- Mitsubishi Outlander P-HEV

2018

- Hyundai Ioniq Plug-in (production ended in 2022)
- Mercedes-Benz GLC 350e 4MATIC
- Karma Revero (updated version of the Fisker Karma)
- Jaguar I-Pace (production ended in 2024)

2019

- Hyundai Kona Electric
- Subaru Crosstrek Plug-in Hybrid (production ended in 2023)
- Kia e-Niro / Niro EV
- Audi e-tron / Q8 e-tron (production ended in 2025)
- Mercedes-Benz EQC (production ended in 2023)
- Porsche Taycan

2020

- Audi Q5 55 TFSIe
- Toyota RAV4 Prime / RAV4 PHEV
- Tesla Model Y
- Fiat 500e
- ElectraMeccanica SOLO (three-wheeler, production ended in 2023)
- Ford Mustang Mach-E
- Volvo V60 PHEV Engine Polestar
- Volvo S60 Plug-in Hybrid
- Polestar 1
- Polestar 2
- BMW iX3

2021

- Volkswagen ID.4
- Volvo XC40 Recharge
- Chevrolet Bolt EUV
- Ford Escape PHEV
- Jeep Wrangler 4xe
- Lexus NX 450h+
- Lincoln Corsair Grand Touring PHEV
- Lucid Air
- Mazda MX-30
- Rivian R1T pickup truck
- GMC Hummer EV
- Hyundai Ioniq 5
- Kia EV6
- BMW i4
- BMW iX
- Mercedes-Benz EQB
- Mercedes-Benz EQS
- Volvo C40 Recharge / EC40
- Audi Q4 e-tron
- Genesis Electrified G80
- Genesis GV60
- Mercedes-Benz EQA
- Rivian EDV

2022

- Nissan Ariya
- Ford F-150 Lightning
- Mercedes-Benz EQS SUV
- Cadillac Lyriq
- Alfa Romeo Tonale / Dodge Hornet R/T
- Chevrolet BrightDrop (formerly BrightDrop Zevo)
- Lordstown Endurance (limited production)
- Toyota bZ4X / bZ
- Lexus RX 450h+
- Lexus TX 550h+
- Subaru Solterra
- Fisker Ocean (production ended 2024)
- BMW i7
- BMW iX1
- Genesis Electrified GV70
- Hyundai Ioniq 6
- Mercedes-Benz EQE
- Mercedes-Benz EQE SUV
- Rivian R1S
- Volkswagen ID. Buzz
- Ford E-Transit

2023

- Audi Q6 e-tron
- BMW i5
- BMW iX2
- Chevrolet Blazer EV
- Chevrolet Silverado EV
- Faraday Future FF 91 (limited production)
- Genesis GV60
- Kia EV9
- Lexus RZ
- Mazda CX-90 PHEV
- Maserati GranTurismo Folgore
- Maserati Grecale Folgore
- Mini Cooper Countryman SE
- Rolls-Royce Spectre
- Tesla Cybertruck

2024

- Acura ZDX
- Bentley Continental GT
- Chevrolet Equinox EV
- Cadillac Escalade IQ
- Cadillac Celestiq
- Dodge Charger Daytona
- Honda Prologue
- Hyundai Ioniq 9
- Jeep Wagoneer S
- Lamborghini Urus SE
- Lucid Gravity
- Mazda CX-70 PHEV
- Mercedes-Benz G580
- Polestar 3
- Porsche Macan
- Volvo EX90

2025

- Audi A6 e-tron
- Cadillac Optiq
- Cadillac Vistiq
- Hyundai Ioniq 9
- Mercedes-Benz CLA
- Subaru Uncharted

2026

- Jeep Recon
- Kia EV3
- Rivian R2
- Polestar 4 coupe
- Volvo EX60

=== Future cars and trucks (2027-2028) ===
The following is a list of electric cars and plug-in hybrids with market launch in the United States anticipated up to 2028.

- Aptera (solar electric vehicle)
- Ford Fathom
- Rivian R3
- Subaru Getaway
- Subaru Trailseeker
- Tesla Cybercab
- Tesla Roadster (2nd Generation)
- Toyota C-HR
- Toyota Highlander BEV

== U.S. electric vehicle organizations ==
- CalCars (The California Cars Initiative)'
- Drive Electric Colorado - partnership of Colorado Energy Office and several non-profit advocacy groups
- Drive Oregon
- Electric Auto Association of Northern Nevada
- Electric Auto Association Silicon Valley
- Electric Car Society
- Electric Vehicle Association (EVA) (North America)
- Humboldt Electric Vehicle Association
- NEDRA National Electric Drive Racing Association
- Oregon Electric Vehicle Association
- Plug In America
- PHEV Research Center
- Project EVIE
- RechargeIT (Google.org)
- San Francisco BayLEAFs
- Seattle Electric Vehicle Association
- World Electric Vehicle Association
- Zero Emission Transportation Association (ZETA) - industry group advocating for 100% EV sales by 2030; members include various businesses throughout the EV value chain: EV manufacturers (cars, pickups, buses), ride-sharing, EV batteries (raw materials, manufacture, recycling), EV charging, solar EV installation, electric companies.

== See also ==
- CalCars
- Plug In America
- Electric car use by country
- Government incentives for plug-in electric vehicles
- Hybrid electric vehicles in the United States
- List of modern production plug-in electric vehicles
- List of modern production plug-in electric vehicles available in the United States
- New energy vehicles in China
- Plug-in electric vehicles in Canada
- Plug-in electric vehicles in Europe
- Plug-in electric vehicles in France
- Plug-in electric vehicles in Germany
- Plug-in electric vehicles in Japan
- Plug-in electric vehicles in the Netherlands
- Plug-in electric vehicles in Norway
- Plug-in electric vehicles in Sweden
- Plug-in electric vehicles in the United Kingdom
