= Electric Vehicle Association =

Education organization

The Electric Vehicle Association (EVA) is a non-profit educational organization that promotes the advancement and widespread adoption of battery electric vehicles. It was formed in 1967 in San Jose, California.

== Members ==
The Electric Vehicle Association (EVA) has over one thousand members internationally, with most in the United States. Members of the EVA receive the monthly "Current EVents" magazine. Many members also belong to one of more than fifty chapters, which serve a local area and meet periodically to exchange information pertinent to electric transportation. Some have their own newsletters as well.

Other EVA chapters have developed into substantial 501c3's on their own, such as Plug In America, which began as a chapter of the EVA. Still, others sprang up to promote special interests, such as plug-in hybrid vehicles by CalCars.org. Starting with a commercially available product such as the Toyota Prius, an external power source was added to recharge the on-board battery, instead of burning hydrocarbons to accomplish that task. It's cleaner and more efficient to do so. Now plug-in hybrids abound in the marketplace, owing largely to this concerted push.

In recent years, various Original Equipment Manufacturers (OEMs) began producing fully electric vehicles for sale, necessitating less ″backyard craftsmanship″ efforts by our members. Then automakers took notice and the product has become a serious market segment contender.

== See also ==
- CalCars
- Green vehicle
- Plug In America
- Plug-in electric vehicle
- RechargeIT
- Tour de Sol
