= Plug In America =

U.S. non-profit organization

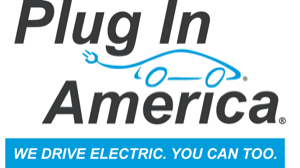
- Founded: August 24, 2005
- Type: 501(c)(3)
- Purpose: Plug-in electric vehicles
- Key people: Tonia Buell, President; Joel Levin, Executive Director
- Website: pluginamerica.org

Plug In America (PIA) is a 501(c)(3) non-profit educational organization that promotes and advocates the use of plug-in cars, trucks and sports utility vehicles (SUVs) powered by domestic and renewable electricity which it claims will help reduce dependence on fossil fuels, improve the global environment and reduce greenhouse gases and climate change.

PIA advocates the development of plug-in hybrid electric vehicles, battery electric vehicles, and other vehicles which use electricity, from the power grid or from electricity-generating devices such as solar cells, as a substantial source of motive energy.

== History ==
Plug In America was founded by a group of electric vehicle advocates that earlier formed DontCrush.com, a coalition organized to stop automobile manufacturers from destroying electric vehicles at the end of their lease. Because of DontCrush.com's previous success in preventing the destruction of Toyota and Ford electric car models, and exposing General Motors' decision to discontinue its plug-in hybrid, the group hoped to strengthen its cause for plug-in vehicles by forming PIA.

The film Who Killed the Electric Car? documented the actions of Plug In America's founders and brought increased attention to the subject. Following this, Plug In America officially incorporated as a 501(c)(3) nonprofit organization in 2008.

In 2009, supporters of Plug In America emailed more than 50,000 letters to members of Congress, resulting in the $7,500 federal tax credit for electric vehicle purchases being included in the American Recovery and Reinvestment Act of 2009.

In 2011, Plug In America partnered with the Sierra Club and Electric Auto Association to create the first National Plug-In Day, which included events promoting electric vehicles across the United States. The annual event has since grown to National Drive Electric Week.

After eight years of being primarily volunteer-run, in 2015, Plug In America hired its first executive director, Joel Levin. Since that time, the organization has grown to include eleven additional staff members as of April 2022.

The organization's mission is to drive change to accelerate the shift to plug-in vehicles powered by clean, affordable, domestic electricity to reduce our nation's dependence on petroleum, improve air quality, and reduce greenhouse gas emissions.

== Programs ==
Plug In America helps consumers, policy-makers, auto manufacturers and others to understand the benefits of driving electric vehicles. It provides practical, objective information to help consumers select the best plug-in vehicle for their lifestyles and needs.

The organization orchestrates electric car test drives and ride-alongs in communities around the country. Plug In America partners with the Sierra Club and Electric Auto Association for National Drive Electric Week, held annually each September. The 2018 National Drive Electric Week included more than 185,000 attendees across 321 events in all 50 states, plus Canada and New Zealand. National Drive Electric Week events include ride-and-drives, car showcases, parades, press conferences, and speeches from elected officials.

For 2019, in addition to the fall National Drive Electric Week, the group is launching an annual Drive Electric Earth Day (DEED) in April, which also incorporates Earth Day events in the U.S., Canada, and other countries.

In 2017, Plug In America partnered with the Department of Energy to hold ride-and-drive events in the Northeast, Georgia, San Diego, and other communities across America. The group also conducts ride-and-drive events in the greater Los Angeles area through partnerships with Southern California Edison and Los Angeles Department of Water and Power.

Plug In America advocates for policies that promote electric vehicles at the federal and state levels, including extending the federal EV tax credit, expanding California's zero-emission vehicles mandates to more states, increasing access to charging infrastructure, access to HOV lanes, and registration incentives. In 2017, Plug In America supporters sent letters and made calls to Congress to save the $7,500 federal EV tax credit. Also, in 2017, they promoted EV legislation in states including California, Colorado, Connecticut, Georgia, Maine, Maryland, Massachusetts, New Jersey, Oregon, Pennsylvania, and Washington. They host an annual EV ride-and-drive for U.S. senators to give lawmakers the opportunity to experience electric vehicles. In June 2018, the group released the AchiEVe toolkit of policies promoting EV adoption for state and local governments.

The organization developed PlugStar, a program that improves the EV purchase experience. Plug In America provides training for automotive dealers on various aspects of EV ownership, including government incentives for EVs, utility rates and programs, and emerging best practices in EV sales, to better assist consumers considering an electric vehicle. Pilot programs to train automotive dealers were launched in San Diego and Boston in 2017, followed by programs in Los Angeles and Sacramento. Additionally, the PlugStar online tools provide consumers with vehicle comparisons, information on charging equipment, tax credits and other incentives, and options to contact PlugStar-certified dealers.

In 2018, the organization presented the first annual Drive Electric Awards to individuals and organizations that have contributed to the EV movement.

In 2019, the organization launched an EV Support Program to provide current and potential EV drivers with one-on-one assistance.

== See also ==
- CalCars
- Government incentives for plug-in electric vehicles
- List of modern production plug-in electric vehicles
- Plug-in electric vehicles in the United States
- RechargeIT
- Who Killed the Electric Car? (documentary)
