= Plug-in electric vehicle =

Type of vehicle

- All-time top-selling plug-in cars
- (global sales up to 2023-12)

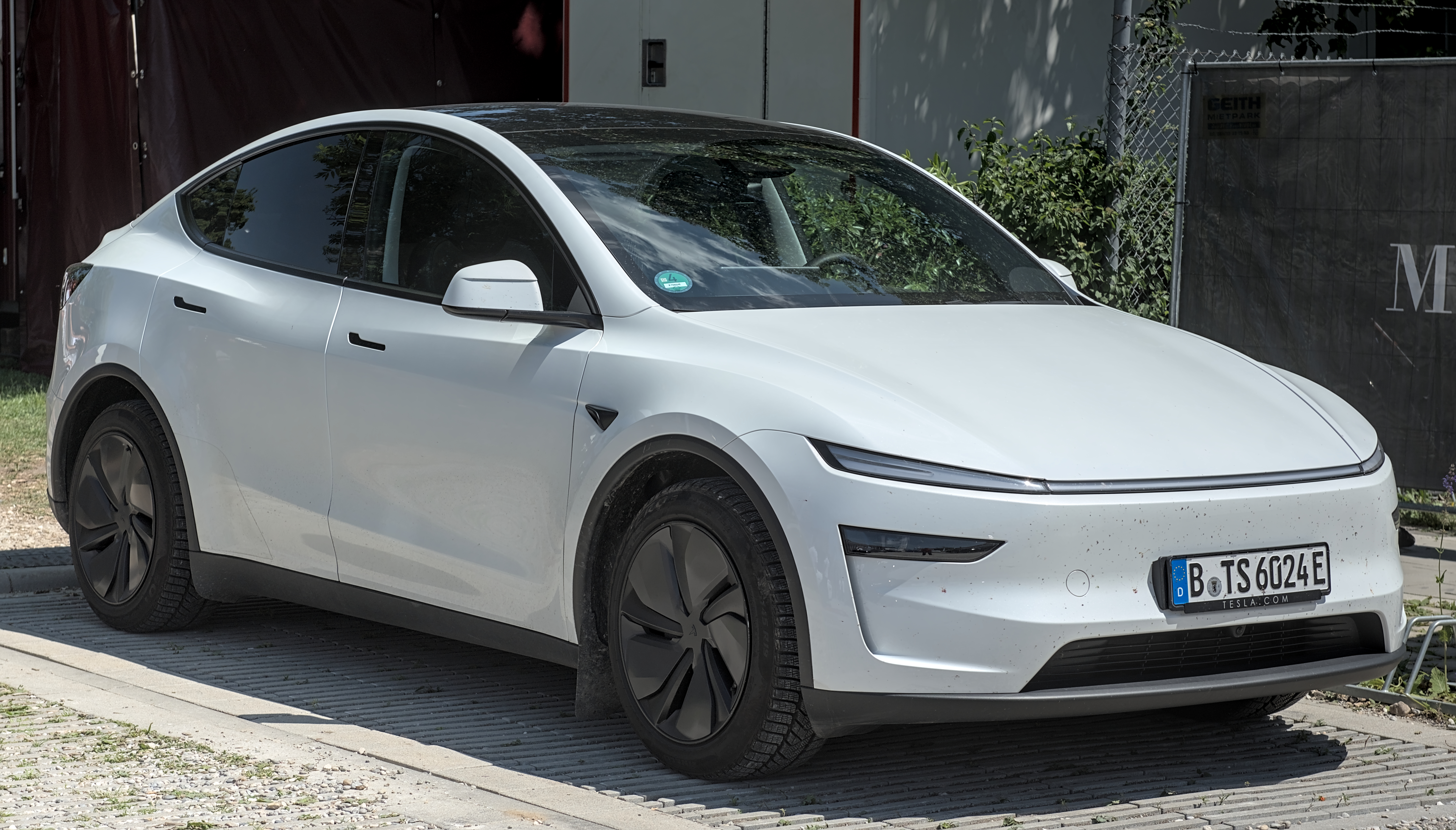
Tesla Model Y electric car (2.49 million)

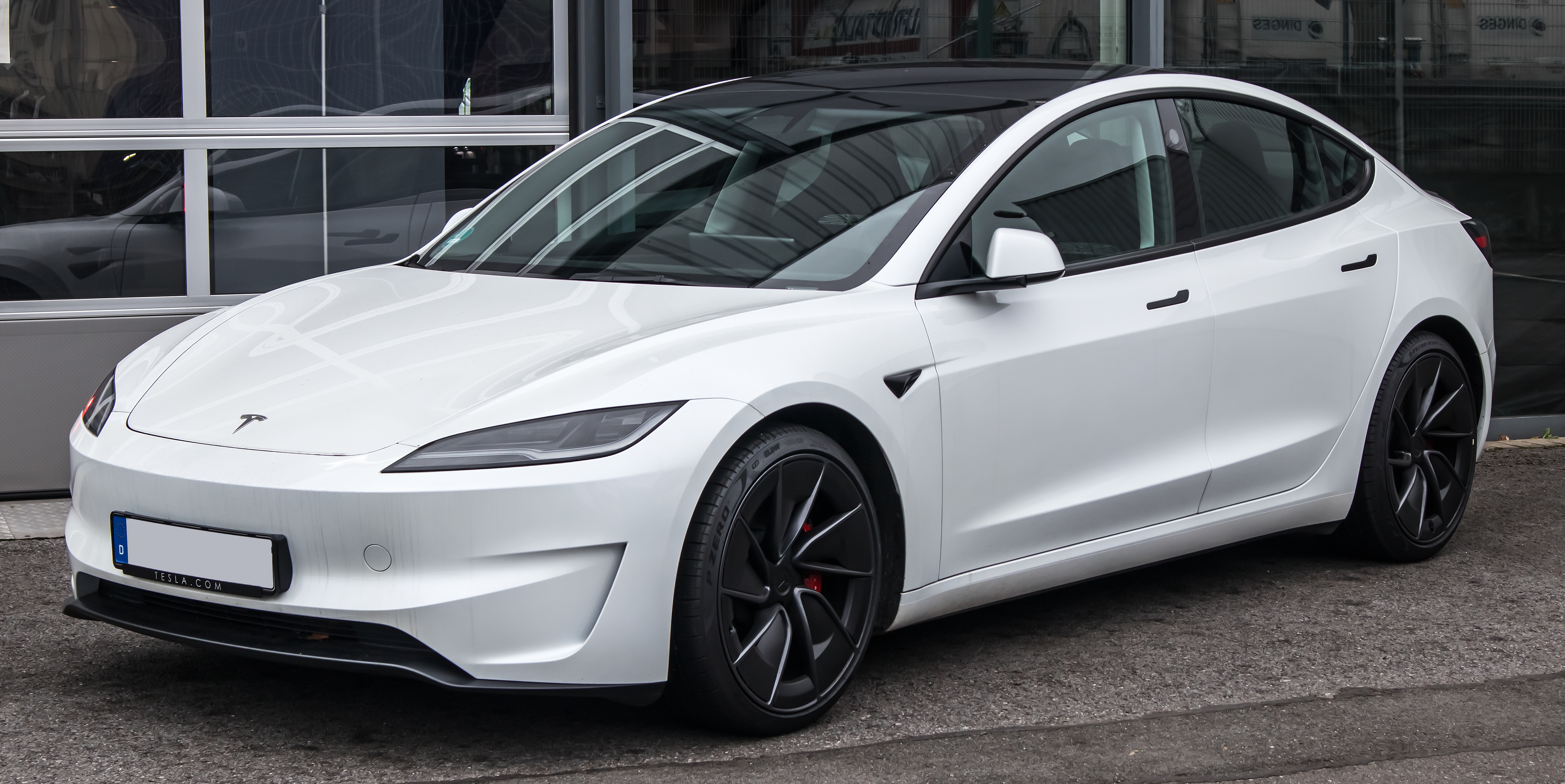
Tesla Model 3 electric car (2.06 million)

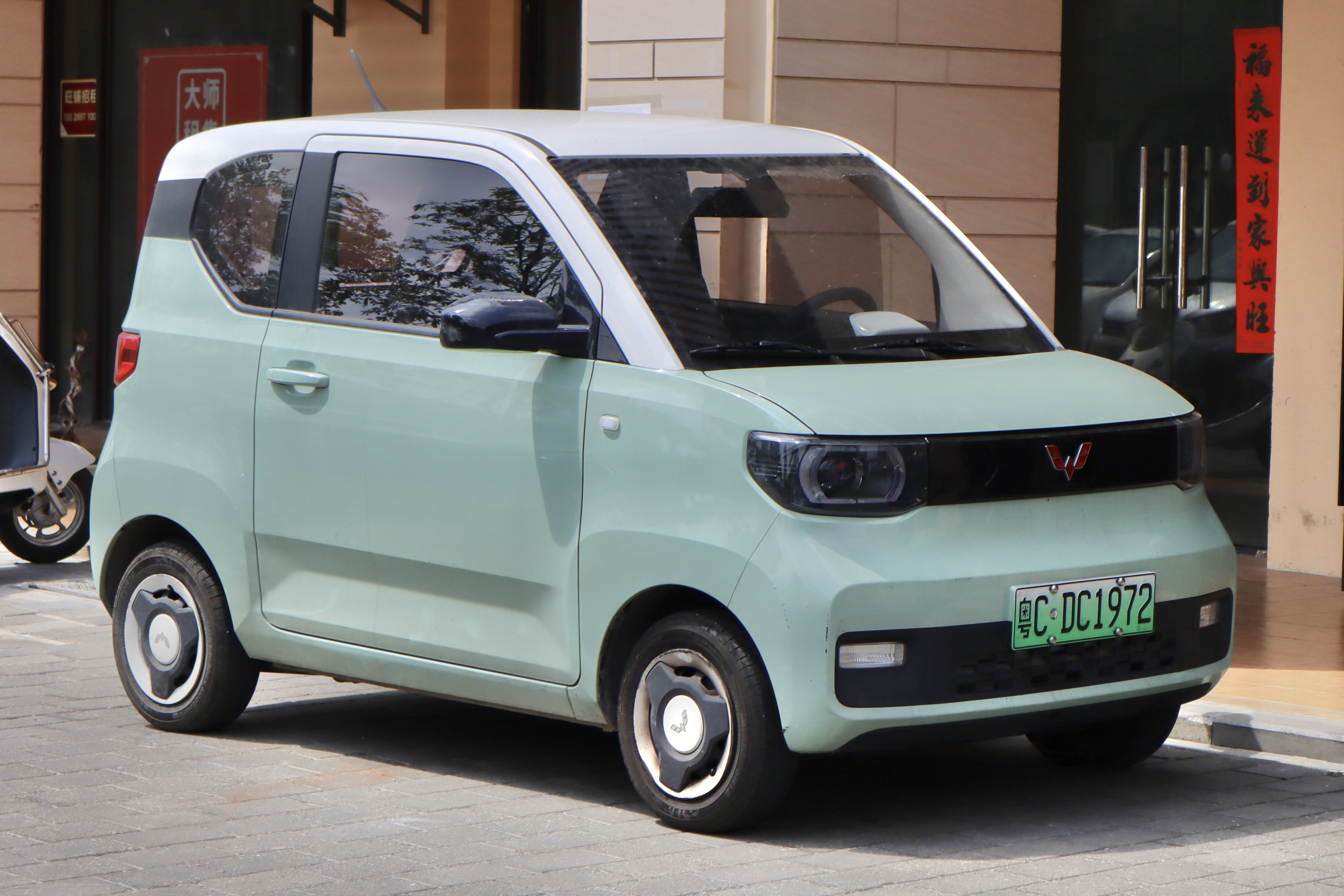
Wuling Hongguang Mini EV electric car (1.22 million)

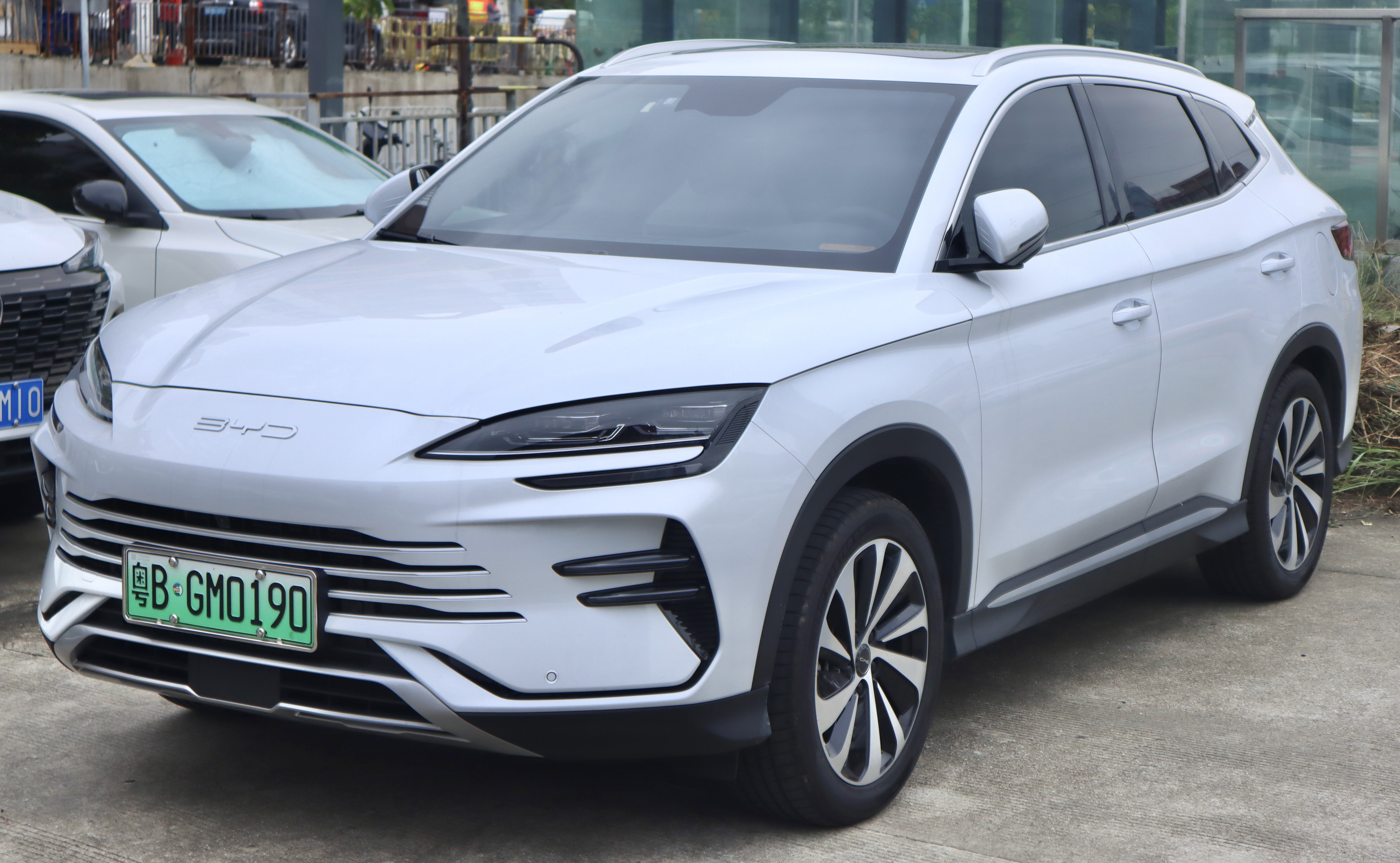
BYD Song DM plug-in hybrid car (>1.05 million)

As of December 2023

A plug-in electric vehicle is any road vehicle that can utilize an external source of electricity (such as a wall socket that connects to the power grid) via a detachable power cable to store electrical energy within its onboard rechargeable battery packs, which will in turn power an electric traction motor that propels the vehicle's drive wheels. It is a subset of electric vehicles and includes all-electric/battery electric vehicles (BEVs) and plug-in hybrid electric vehicles (PHEVs) both of which are capable of sustained all-electric driving within a designated range due to the ability to fully charge their batteries before a journey.

Plug-in electric vehicles have several benefits compared to conventional internal combustion engine vehicles. All-electric vehicles have lower operating and maintenance costs, and produce little or no air pollution when under all-electric mode, thus (depending on the electricity source) reducing societal dependence on fossil fuels and significantly decreasing greenhouse gas emissions, but recharging takes longer time than refueling and is heavily reliant on sufficient charging infrastructures to remain operationally practical. Plug-in hybrid vehicles are a good in-between option that provides most of electric vehicles' benefits when they are operating in electric mode, though typically having shorter all-electric ranges, but have the auxiliary option of driving as a conventional hybrid vehicle when the battery is low, using its internal combustion engine (usually a gasoline engine) to alleviate the range anxiety that accompanies current electric vehicles.

Sales of the first series production plug-in electric vehicles began in December 2008 with the introduction of the plug-in hybrid BYD F3DM, and then with the all-electric Mitsubishi i-MiEV in July 2009, but global retail sales only gained traction after the introduction of the mass production all-electric Nissan Leaf and the plug-in hybrid Chevrolet Volt in December 2011. Cumulative global sales of highway-legal plug-in electric passenger cars and light utility vehicles achieved the 1 million unit mark in September 2015, 5 million in December 2018. and the 10 million unit milestone in 2020. Despite the rapid growth experienced, however, the stock of plug-in electric vehicles represented just 1% of all passengers vehicles on the world's roads by the end of 2020, of which pure electrics constituted two thirds.

As of December 2023, the Tesla Model Y ranked as the world's top selling highway-capable plug-in electric car in history. The Tesla Model 3 was the first electric car to achieve global sales of more than 1,000,000 units. The BYD Song DM SUV series is the world's all-time best selling plug-in hybrid, with global sales over 1,050,000 units through December 2023. As of December 2021, China had the world's largest stock of highway legal plug-in electric passenger cars with 7.84 million units, representing 46% of the world's stock of plug-in cars. Europe ranked next with about 5.6 million light-duty plug-in cars and vans at the end of 2021, accounting for around 32% of the global stock. The U.S. cumulative sales totaled about 2.32 million plug-in cars through December 2021. As of July 2021, Germany is the leading European country with cumulative sales of 1 million plug-in vehicles on the road, and also has led the continent plug-in sales since 2019. Norway has the highest market penetration per capita in the world, and also achieved in 2021 the world's largest annual plug-in market share ever registered, 86.2% of new car sales.

== Terminology ==
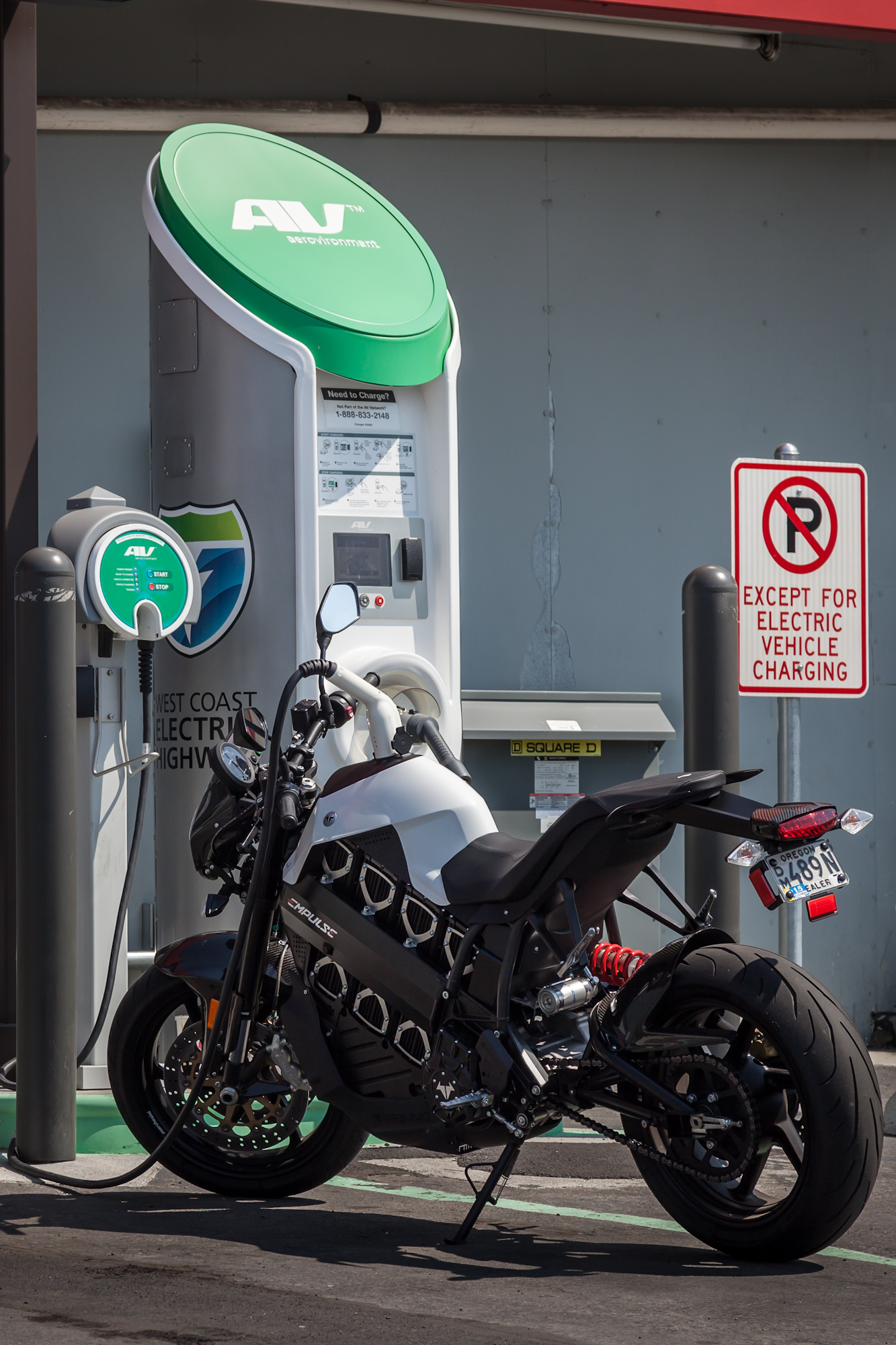
Brammo Empulse electric motorcycle at a charging station

=== Plug-in electric vehicle ===
A plug-in electric vehicle (PEV) is any motor vehicle with rechargeable battery packs that can be charged from the electric grid, and the electricity stored on board drives or contributes to drive the wheels for propulsion. Plug-in electric vehicles are also sometimes referred to as grid-enabled vehicles (GEV), and the European Automobile Manufacturers Association (ACEA) calls them electrically chargeable vehicles (ECV).

PEV is a subcategory of electric vehicles that includes battery electric vehicles (BEVs), plug-in hybrid vehicles (PHEVs), and electric vehicle conversions of hybrid electric vehicles and conventional internal combustion engine vehicles. Even though conventional hybrid electric vehicles (HEVs) have a battery that is continually recharged with power from the internal combustion engine and regenerative braking, they can not be recharged from an off-vehicle electric energy source, and therefore, they do not belong to the category of plug-in electric vehicles.

"Plug-in electric drive vehicle" is the legal term used in U.S. federal legislation to designate the category of motor vehicles eligible for federal tax credits depending on battery size and their all-electric range. In some European countries, particularly in France, "electrically chargeable vehicle" is the formal term used to designate the vehicles eligible for these incentives. While the term "plug-in electric vehicle" most often refers to automobiles or "plug-in cars", there are several other types of plug-in electric vehicle, including battery electric multiple units, electric motorcycles and scooters, neighborhood electric vehicles or microcars, city cars, vans, buses, electric trucks or lorries, and military vehicles.

=== New energy vehicles ===
In China, the term new energy vehicles (NEVs) refers to automobile vehicles that are fully powered or predominantly powered by alternative energy other than fossil fuels, typically referring to electric motor-propelled vehicles such as battery electric vehicles (BEVs), plug-in hybrid electric vehicles (PHEVs) and fuel cell electric vehicles (FCEVs, mainly hydrogen fuel cell vehicles). The Chinese government began implementation of its NEV program in 2009 to foster the development and introduction of new energy vehicles, aiming to reduce the country's reliance on petroleum imports and better achieve energy security by promoting more electrified transportation powered by domestically generated, sustainable energy supply (see Energy policy of China).

=== Battery electric vehicles ===
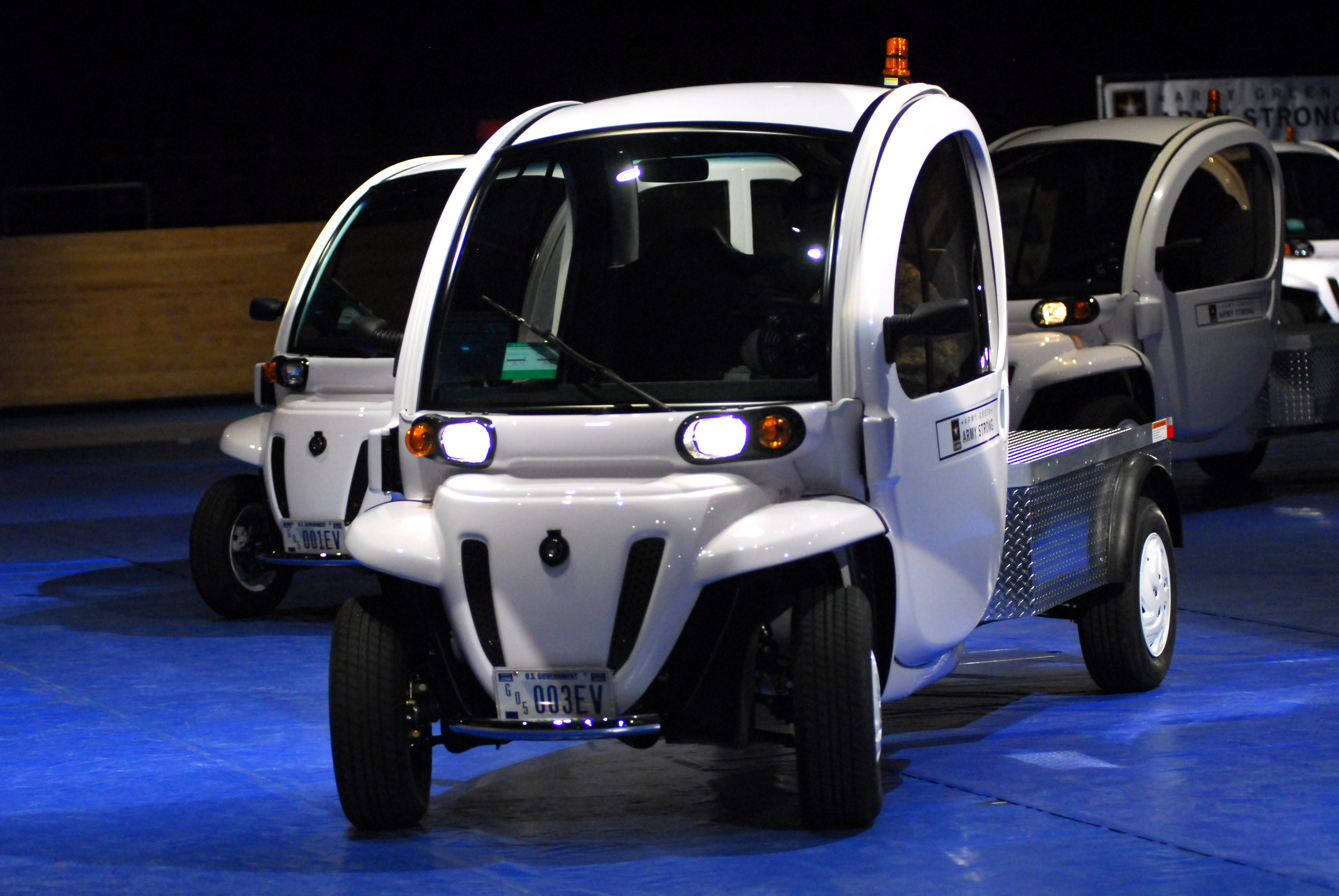
U.S. Army GEM e2 neighborhood electric vehicle

A battery electric vehicle (BEV) uses chemical energy stored in rechargeable battery packs as its only source for propulsion. BEVs use electric motors and motor controllers instead of internal combustion engines (ICEs) for propulsion.

A plug-in hybrid operates as an all-electric vehicle or BEV when operating in charge-depleting mode, but it switches to charge-sustaining mode after the battery has reached its minimum state of charge (SOC) threshold, exhausting the vehicle's all-electric range (AER).

BEVs are all-electric vehicles that use only electricity to power the motor, with no internal combustion engine. The energy stored in the rechargeable battery pack is used to power the electric motor, which propels the vehicle. BEVs have no tailpipe emissions and can be charged by plugging into a charging station or using a home charging system.

They are known for their quiet operation, instant torque, and smooth ride, and are also more environmentally friendly than traditional gasoline-powered vehicles. However, the range of a BEV is limited by the size of its battery, so it may not be suitable for long-distance travel.

=== Plug-in hybrid electric vehicles ===
A plug-in hybrid electric vehicle (PHEV or PHV), also known as a plug-in hybrid, is a hybrid electric vehicle with rechargeable batteries that can be restored to full charge by connecting a plug to an external electric power source. A plug-in hybrid shares the characteristics of both a conventional hybrid electric vehicle and an all-electric vehicle: it uses a gasoline engine and an electric motor for propulsion, but a PHEV has a larger battery pack that can be recharged, allowing operation in all-electric mode until the battery is depleted.

PHEVs are a hybrid between a traditional gasoline-powered vehicle and an all-electric vehicle. They have both an internal combustion engine and an electric motor powered by a rechargeable battery pack. PHEVs operate as all-electric vehicles when the battery has a sufficient charge, and switch to gasoline power when the battery is depleted.

This provides a longer driving range compared to a pure electric vehicle, as the gasoline engine acts as a range extender. PHEVs can be charged by plugging into a charging station or using a home charging system. They are a good option for those who want the benefits of electric driving, but also need the longer driving range and refueling convenience of a gasoline-powered vehicle.

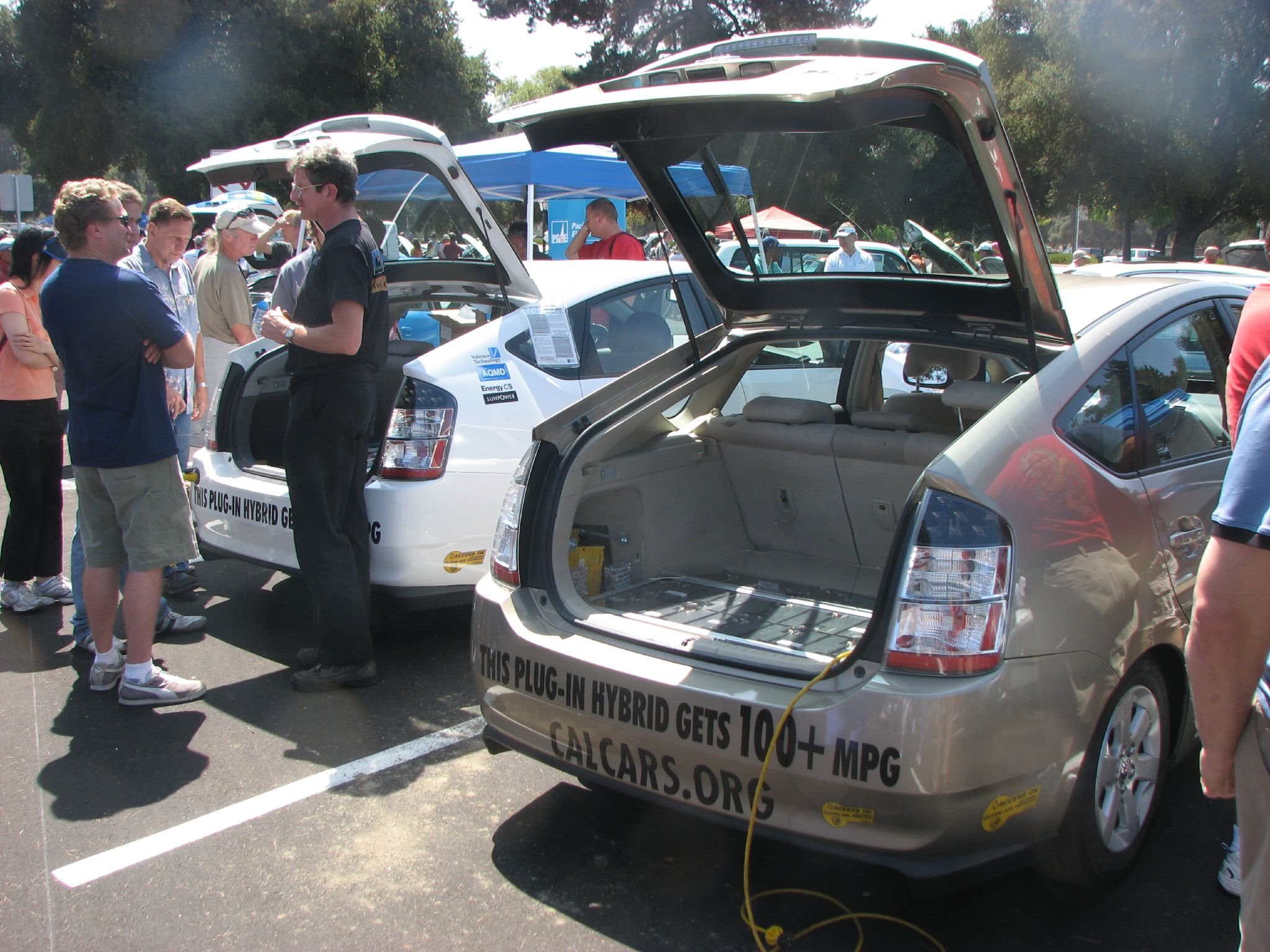
Several Prius+ converted plug-in hybrids

==== Dual plug-in hybrids ====
These contain two different energy recovery systems.

The Mercedes-AMG ONE is a plug-in dual hybrid.

The Mercedes-Benz C-Class (W206) and the Mercedes C254/X254 also have an electrically-assisted turbocharger/MGU-H.

=== Aftermarket conversions ===
An aftermarket electric vehicle conversion is the modification of a conventional internal combustion engine vehicle (ICEV) or hybrid electric vehicle (HEV) to electric propulsion, creating an all-electric or plug-in hybrid electric vehicle.

There are several companies in the U.S. offering conversions. The most common conversions have been from hybrid electric cars to plug-in hybrid, but due to the different technology used in hybrids by each carmaker, the easiest conversions are for 2004–2009 Toyota Prius and for the Ford Escape/Mercury Mariner Hybrid.

== Advantages compared to ICE vehicles ==
PEVs have several advantages. These include improved air quality, reduced greenhouse gas emissions, noise reduction, and national security benefits. According to the Center for American Progress, PEVs are an important part of the group of technologies that will help the U.S. meet its goal under the Paris Agreement, which is a 26–28 percent reduction in greenhouse gas emissions by the year 2025. New Energy Vehicles are expected to help address issues related to environmental degradation at the global level."

=== Improved air quality ===
Electric cars, as well as plug-in hybrids operating in all-electric mode, emit no harmful tailpipe pollutants from the onboard source of power, such as particulates (soot), volatile organic compounds, hydrocarbons, carbon monoxide, ozone, lead, and various oxides of nitrogen. However, like ICE cars, electric cars emit particulates from brake and tyres. Depending on the source of the electricity used to recharge the batteries, air pollutant emissions are shifted to the location of the generation plants where they can be more easily captured from flue gases. Cities with chronic air pollution problems, such as Los Angeles, México City, Santiago, Chile, São Paulo, Beijing, Bangkok and Kathmandu may also gain local clean air benefits by shifting the harmful emission to electric generation plants located outside the cities.

=== Lower greenhouse gas emissions ===
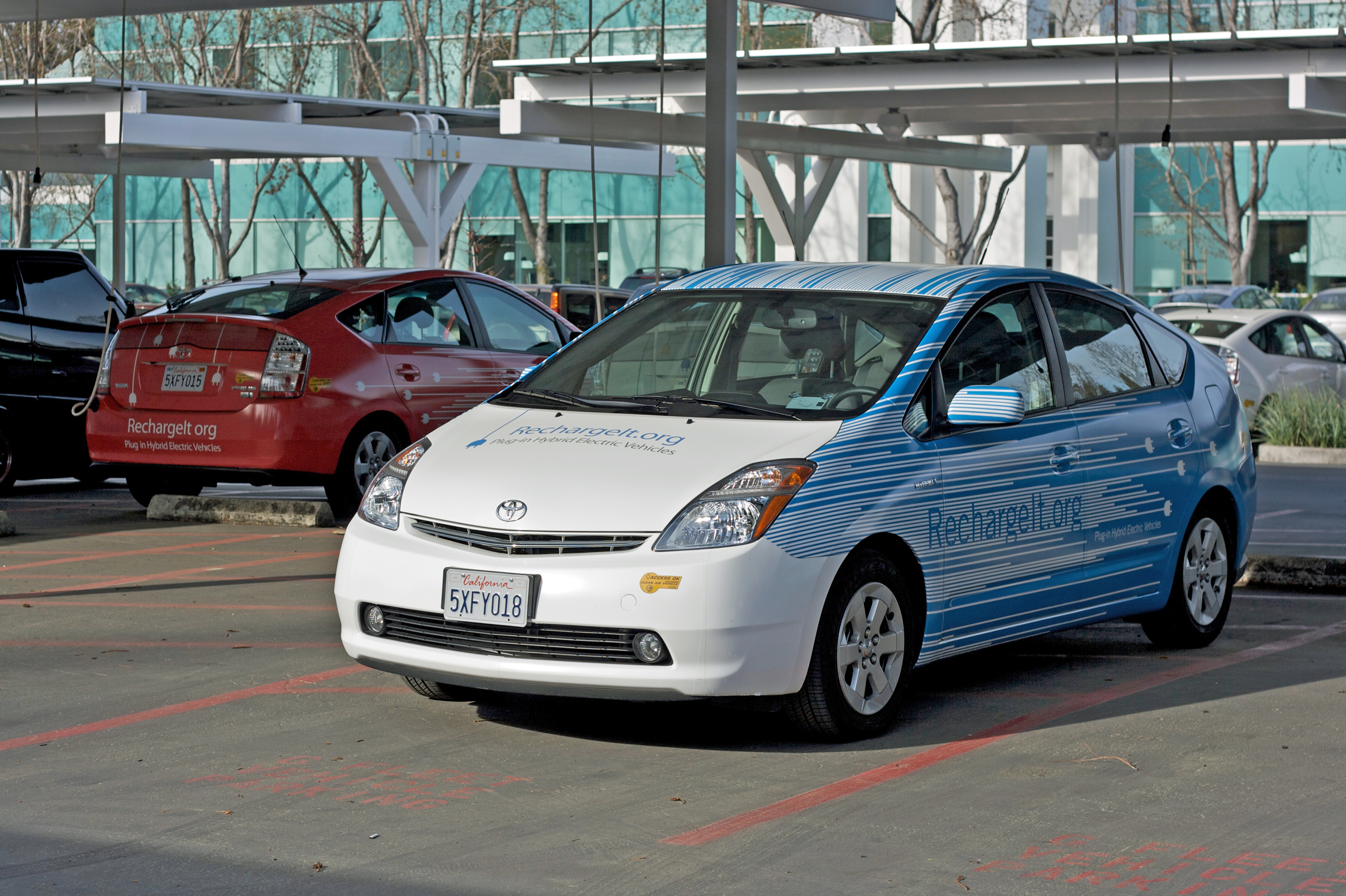
RechargeIT converted Toyota Prius plug-in hybrids at Google's Mountain View campus. The garage has recharging facilities powered by solar panels.

Plug-in electric vehicles operating in all-electric mode do not emit greenhouse gases from the onboard source of power, but from the point of view of a well-to-wheel assessment, the extent of the benefit also depends on the fuel and technology used for electricity generation. This fact has been referred to as the long tailpipe of plug-in electric vehicles. From the perspective of a full life cycle analysis, the electricity used to recharge the batteries must be generated from renewable or clean sources such as wind, solar, hydroelectric, or nuclear power for PEVs to have almost none or zero well-to-wheel emissions. In the case of plug-in hybrid electric vehicles operating in hybrid mode with assistance of the internal combustion engine, tailpipe and greenhouse emissions are lower in comparison to conventional cars because of their higher fuel economy.

The magnitude of the potential advantage depends on the mix of generation sources and therefore varies by country and by region. For example, France can obtain significant emission benefits from electric and plug-in hybrids because most of its electricity is generated by nuclear power plants; similarly, most regions of Canada are primarily powered with hydroelectricity, nuclear, or natural gas which have no or very low emissions at the point of generation; and the state of California, where most energy comes from natural gas, hydroelectric and nuclear plants can also secure substantial emission benefits. The United Kingdom also has a significant potential to benefit from PEVs as low carbon sources such as wind turbines dominate the generation mix. Nevertheless, the location of the plants is not relevant when considering greenhouse gas emission because their effect is global.

Lifecycle GHG emissions are complex to calculate, but compared to ICE cars generally while the EV battery causes higher emissions during vehicle manufacture this excess carbon debt is paid back after several months of driving.

=== Lower operating and maintenance costs ===
Internal combustion engines are relatively inefficient at converting on-board fuel energy to propulsion as most of the energy is wasted as heat, and the rest while the engine is idling. Electric motors, on the other hand, are more efficient at converting stored energy into driving a vehicle. Electric drive vehicles do not consume energy while at rest or coasting, and modern plug-in cars can capture and reuse as much as one fifth of the energy normally lost during braking through regenerative braking. Typically, conventional gasoline engines effectively use only 15% of the fuel energy content to move the vehicle or to power accessories, and diesel engines can reach on-board efficiencies of 20%, while electric drive vehicles typically have on-board efficiencies of around 80%.

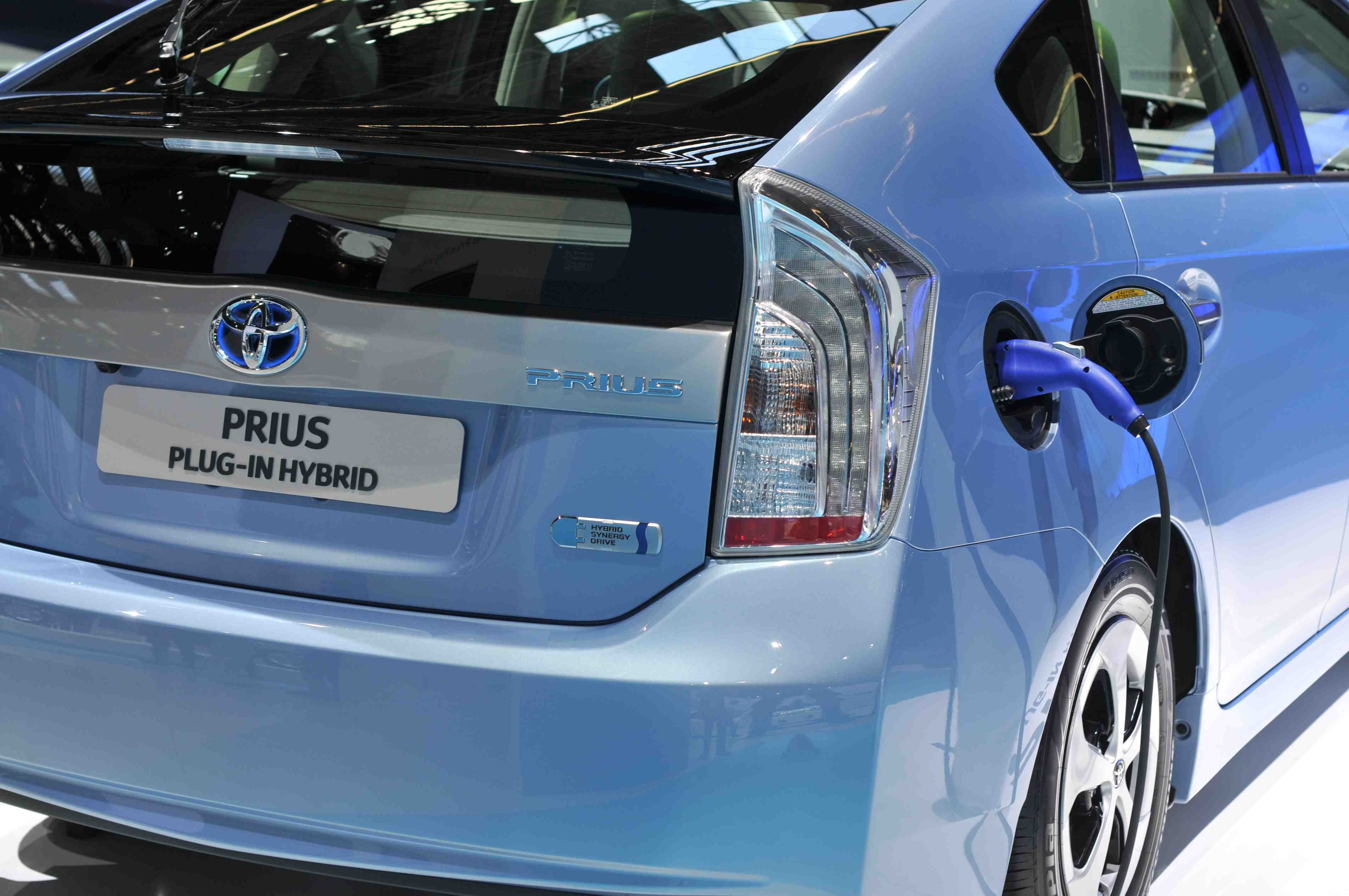
The operating cost of the Toyota Prius Plug-in Hybrid in the U.S. is estimated at US$0.03 per mile while operating in all-electric mode.

All-electric and plug-in hybrid vehicles also have lower maintenance costs as compared to internal combustion vehicles, since electronic systems break down much less often than the mechanical systems in conventional vehicles, and the fewer mechanical systems onboard last longer due to the better use of the electric engine. All-electric PEVs do not require oil changes and other routine maintenance checks.

=== Less dependence on imported oil ===
Evolution of oil prices since 1987 (average Brent spot prices – adjusted for U.S. inflation)

For many developing countries, and particularly for the poorest African countries, oil imports have an adverse impact on the government budget and deteriorate their terms of trade thus jeopardizing their balance of payments, all leading to lower economic growth.

Through the gradual replacement of internal combustion engine vehicles for electric cars and plug-in hybrids, electric drive vehicles can contribute significantly to lessen the dependence of the transport sector on imported oil as well as contributing to the development of a more resilient energy supply.

=== Vehicle-to-grid ===
Plug-in electric vehicles offer users the opportunity to sell electricity stored in their batteries back to the power grid, thereby helping utilities to operate more efficiently in the management of their demand peaks. A vehicle-to-grid (V2G) system would take advantage of the fact that most vehicles are parked an average of 95 percent of the time. During such idle times the electricity stored in the batteries could be transferred from the PEV to the power lines and back to the grid. In the U.S. this transfer back to the grid have an estimated value to the utilities of up to $4,000 per year per car. In a V2G system it would also be expected that battery electric (BEVs) and plug-in hybrids (PHEVs) would have the capability to communicate automatically with the power grid to sell demand response services by either delivering electricity into the grid or by throttling their charging rate.

== Disadvantages ==
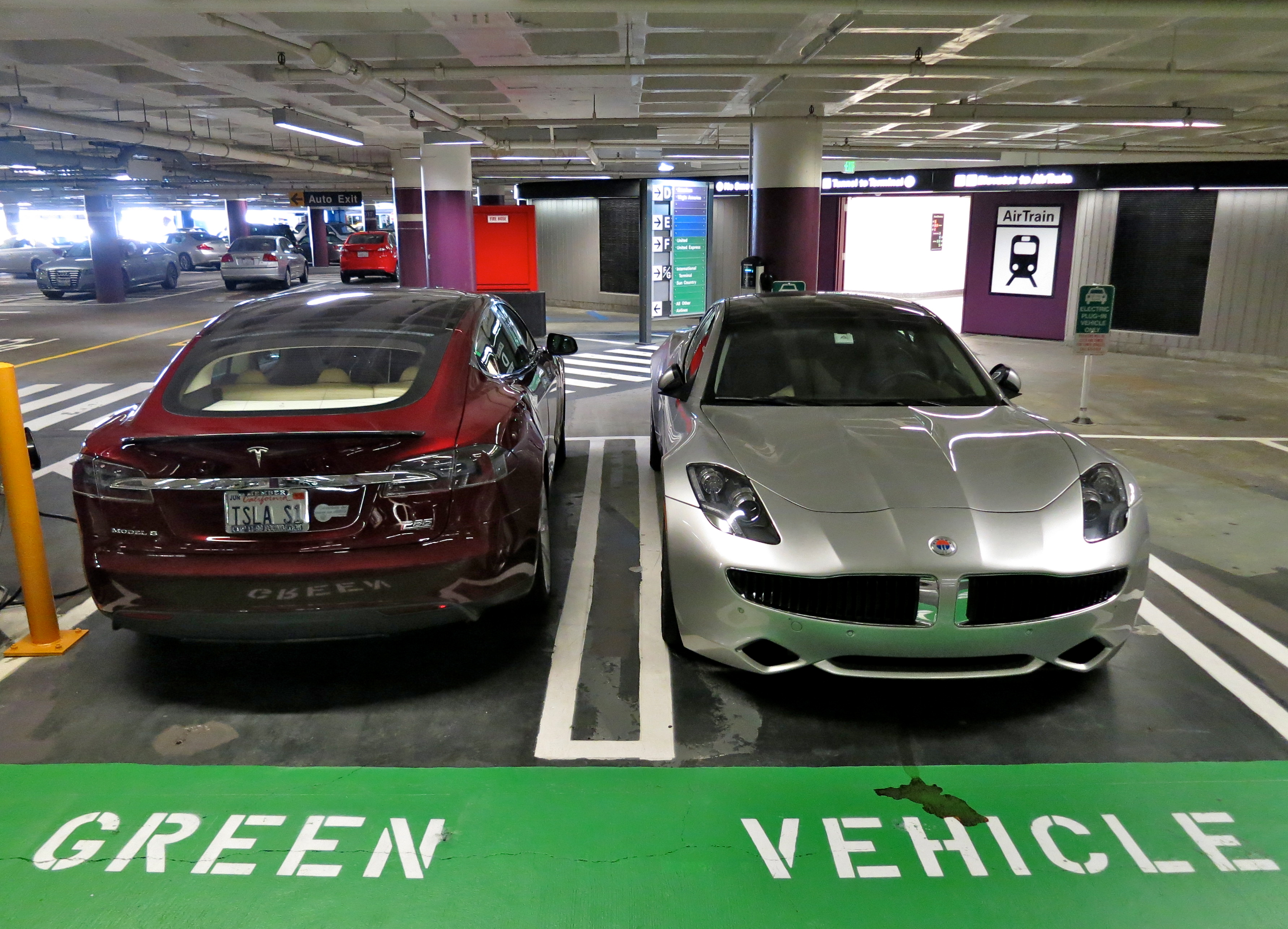
Tesla Model S electric car (left) and Fisker Karma plug-in hybrid (right) at the parking spots reserved for green cars at San Francisco International Airport

=== Cost of batteries ===
As of 2020, plug-in electric vehicles are significantly more expensive as compared to conventional internal combustion engine vehicles and hybrid electric vehicles due to the additional cost of their lithium-ion battery pack. Cost reductions through advances in battery technology and higher production volumes will allow plug-in electric vehicles to be more competitive with conventional internal combustion engine vehicles.

Bloomberg New Energy Finance (BNEF) concludes that battery costs are on a trajectory to make electric vehicles without government subsidies as affordable as internal combustion engine cars in most countries by 2022. BNEF projects that by 2040, long-range electric cars will cost less than US$22,000 expressed in 2016 dollars. BNEF expects electric car battery costs to be well below US$120 per kWh by 2030, and to fall further thereafter as new chemistries become available.

=== Availability of recharging infrastructure ===
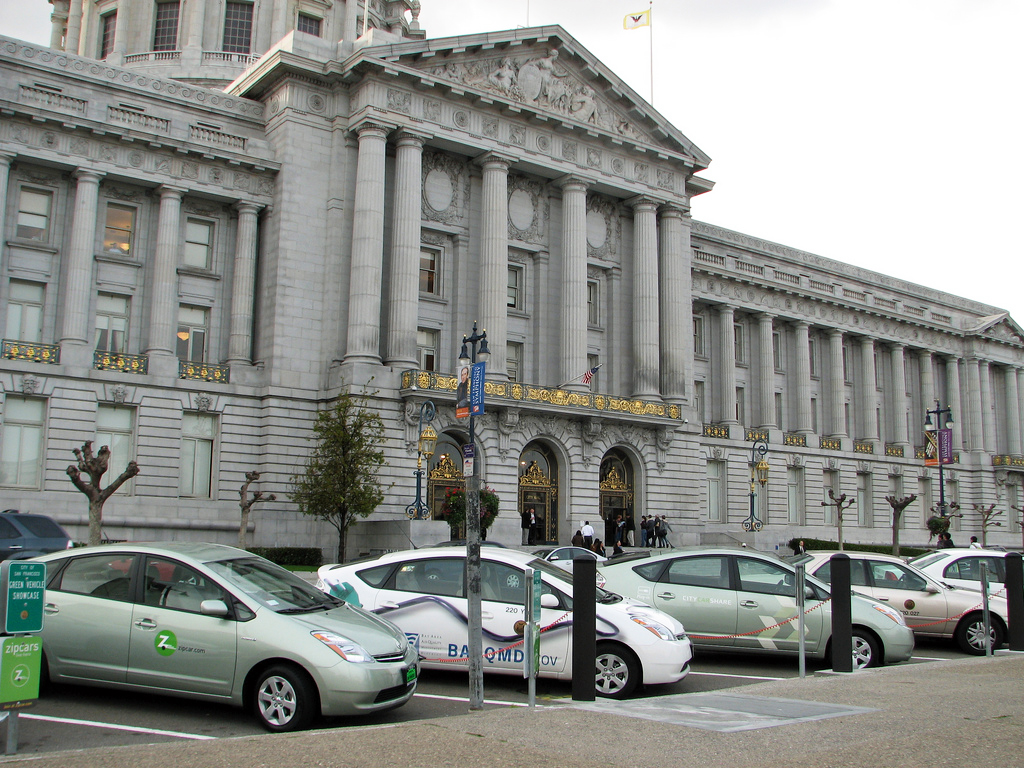
Converted Toyota Prius plug-in hybrids recharging at San Francisco City Hall charging station

Despite the widespread assumption that plug-in recharging will take place overnight at home, residents of cities, apartments, dormitories, and townhouses do not have garages or driveways with available power outlets, and they might be less likely to buy plug-in electric vehicles unless recharging infrastructure is developed. Electrical outlets or charging stations near their places of residence, in commercial or public parking lots, streets and workplaces are required for these potential users to gain the full advantage of PHEVs, and in the case of EVs, to avoid the fear of the batteries running out energy before reaching their destination, commonly called range anxiety. Even house dwellers might need to charge at the office or to take advantage of opportunity charging at shopping centers. However, this infrastructure is not in place and it will require investments by both the private and public sectors.

==== Battery swapping ====
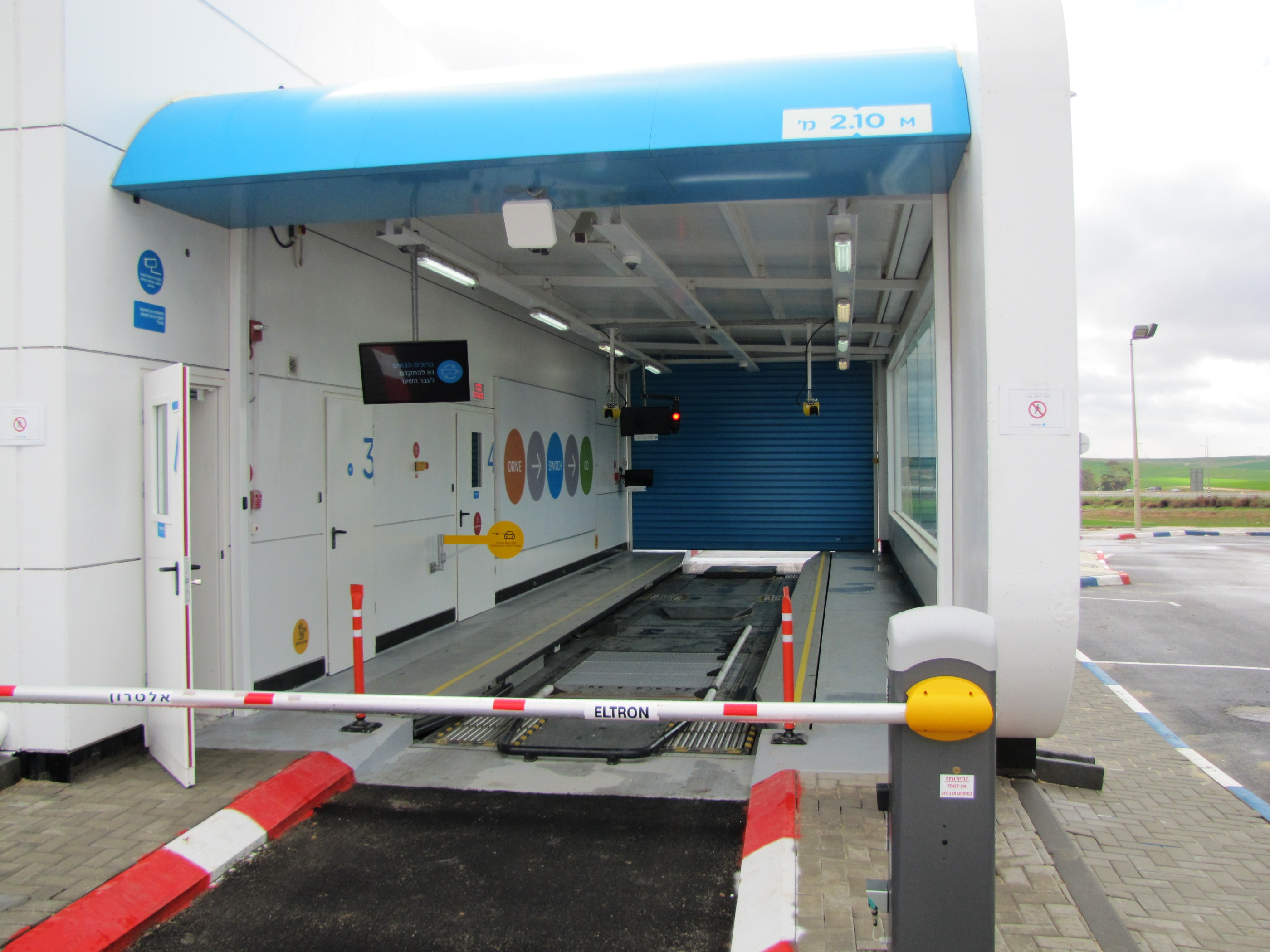
Better Place's battery switching station in Israel

A different approach to resolve the problems of range anxiety and lack of recharging infrastructure for electric vehicles was developed by Better Place but was not successful in the United States in the 2010s. As of 2020 battery swapping is available in China and is planned for other countries. As of 2025 some battery swapping is being performed in well under five minutes in China.

=== Potential overload of local electrical grids ===
The existing low-voltage network, and local transformers in particular, may not have enough capacity to handle the additional power load that might be required in certain areas with high plug-in electric car concentrations. As recharging a single electric-drive car could consume three times as much electricity as a typical home, overloading problems may arise when several vehicles in the same neighborhood recharge at the same time, or during the normal summer peak loads. To avoid such problems, utility executives recommend owners to charge their vehicles overnight when the grid load is lower or to use smarter electric meters that help control demand. When market penetration of plug-in electric vehicles begins to reach significant levels, utilities will have to invest in improvements for local electrical grids in order to handle the additional loads related to recharging to avoid blackouts due to grid overload. Also, some experts have suggested that by implementing variable time-of-day rates, utilities can provide an incentive for plug-in owners to recharge mostly overnight when rates are lower.

In the five years from 2014 to 2019, EVs increased in number and range, and doubled power draw and energy per session. Charging increased after midnight, and decreased in the peak hours of early evening.

=== Risks associated with noise reduction ===
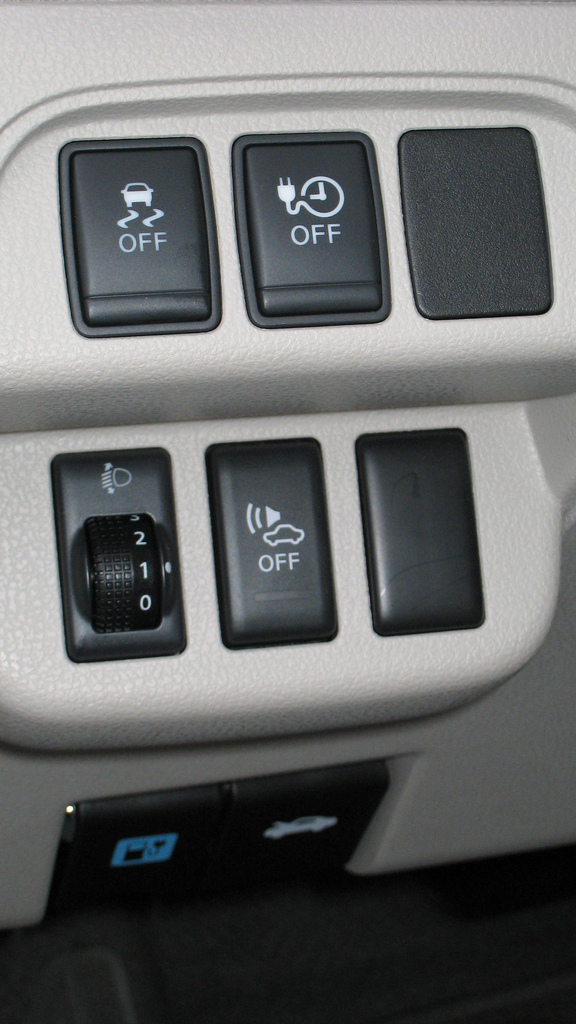
The 2011 Nissan Leaf had a switch to manually turn off its electric warning sound system.

Electric cars and plug-in hybrids when operating in all-electric mode at low speeds produce less roadway noise as compared to vehicles propelled by an internal combustion engine, thereby reducing harmful noise health effects. However, blind people or the visually impaired consider the noise of combustion engines a helpful aid while crossing streets, hence plug-in electric cars and conventional hybrids could pose an unexpected hazard when operating at low speeds. Several tests conducted in the U.S. have shown that this is a valid concern, as vehicles operating in electric mode can be particularly hard to hear below 20 mph (30 km/h) for all types of road users and not only the visually impaired. At higher speeds the sound created by tire friction and the air displaced by the vehicle start to make sufficient audible noise. Therefore, in the 2010s laws were passed in many countries mandating warning sounds at low speeds.

=== Risks of battery fire ===
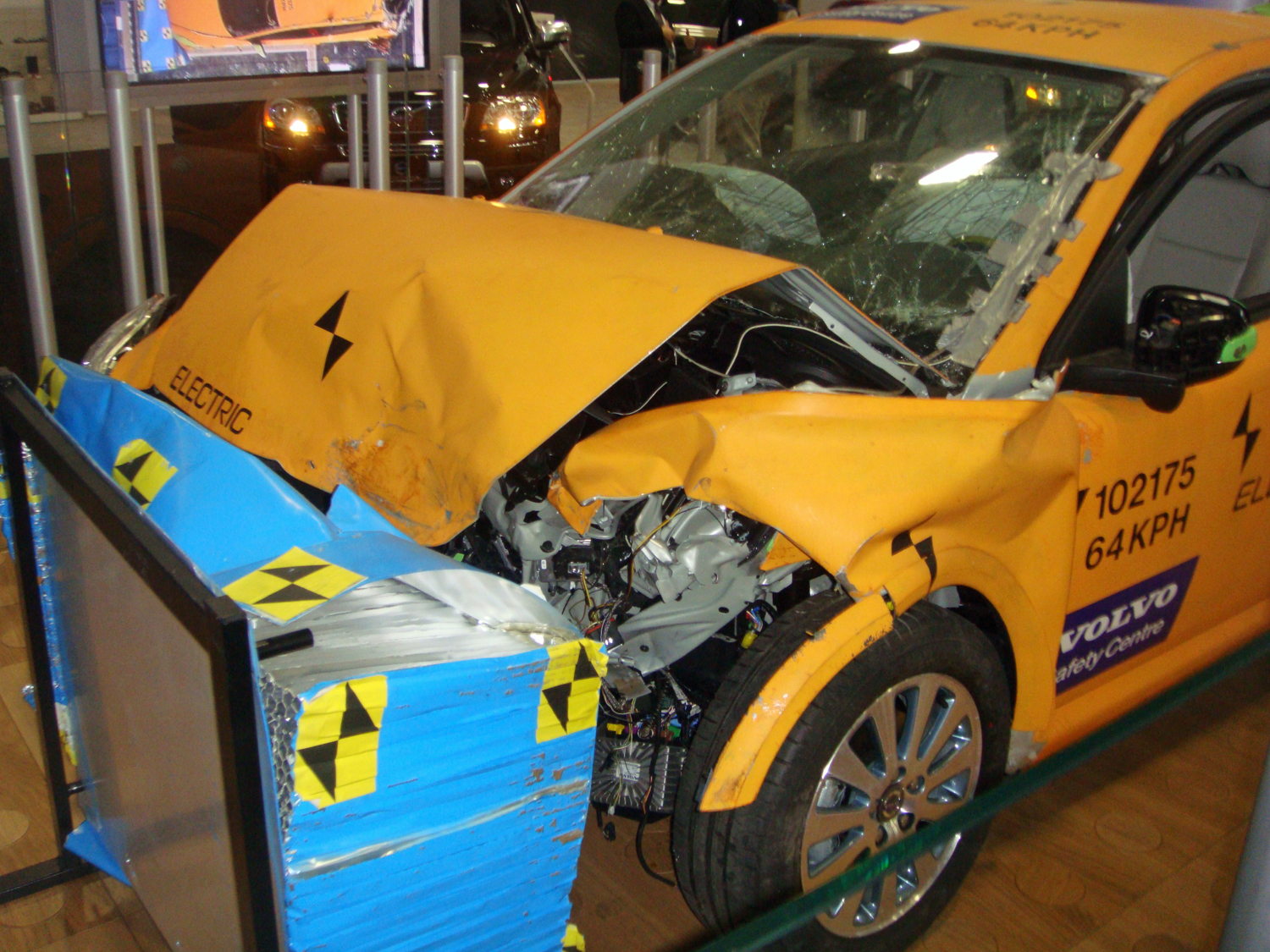
Frontal crash test of a Volvo C30 DRIVe Electric to assess the safety of the battery pack

Lithium-ion batteries may suffer thermal runaway and cell rupture if overheated or overcharged, and in extreme cases this can lead to combustion. Reignition may occur days or months after the original fire has been extinguished. To reduce these risks, lithium-ion battery packs contain fail-safe circuitry that shuts down the battery when its voltage is outside the safe range.

Several plug-in electric vehicle fire incidents have taken place since the introduction of mass-production plug-in electric vehicles in 2008. Most of them have been thermal runaway incidents related to the lithium-ion batteries. General Motors, Tesla, and Nissan have published a guide for firefighters and first responders to properly handle a crashed plug-in electric-drive vehicle and safely disable its battery and other high voltage systems.

=== Car dealers' reluctance to sell ===
With the exception of Tesla and other EV manufacturers that sell directly, almost all new cars in the United States are sold through dealerships, so they play a crucial role in the sales of electric vehicles, and negative attitudes can hinder early adoption of plug-in electric vehicles. Dealers decide which cars they want to stock, and a salesperson can have a significant impact on how a customer feels about a prospective purchase. Salespeople have ample knowledge of internal combustion cars but often do not have time to learn about a technology that represents a fraction of their overall sales. As with any new technology, and in the particular case of advanced technology vehicles, retailers are central to ensuring that buyers, especially those switching to a new technology, have the information and support they need to gain the full benefits of adopting this new technology.

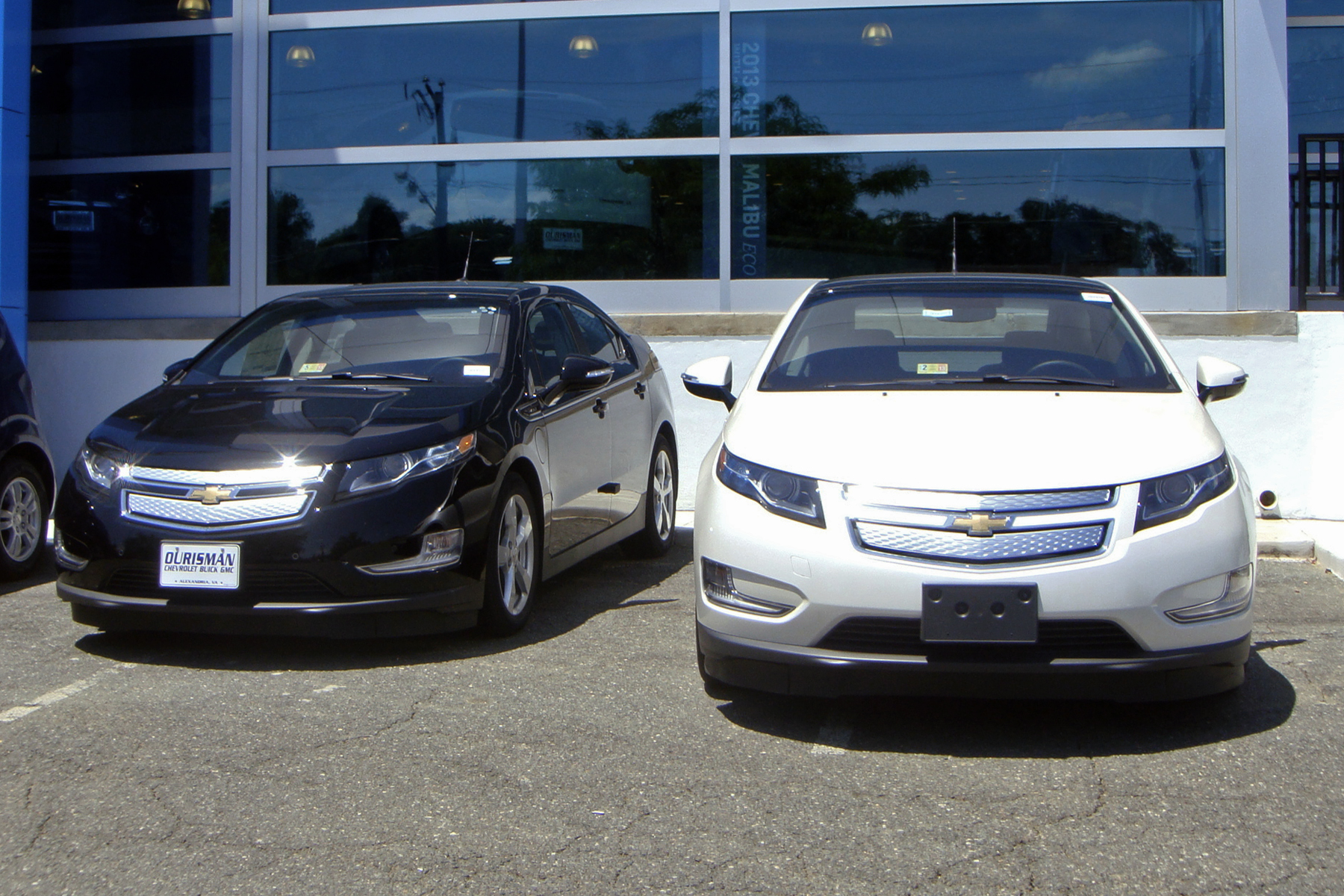
Car dealerships can play a role in the sales of plug-in electric vehicles. Shown a dealership exhibiting first generation Chevrolet Volts.

There are several reasons for the reluctance of some dealers to sell plug-in electric vehicles. PEVs do not offer car dealers the same profits as gasoline-powered cars. Plug-in electric vehicles take more time to sell because of the additional time required to explain a new technology, which hurts overall sales and the commissions of salespeople. Electric vehicles also may require less maintenance, resulting in the loss of recurring service revenue, and thus undermines the biggest source of dealer profits, their service departments. According to the National Automobile Dealers Association (NADS), dealers on average make three times as much profit from service as they do from new car sales.

== Government incentives and policies ==
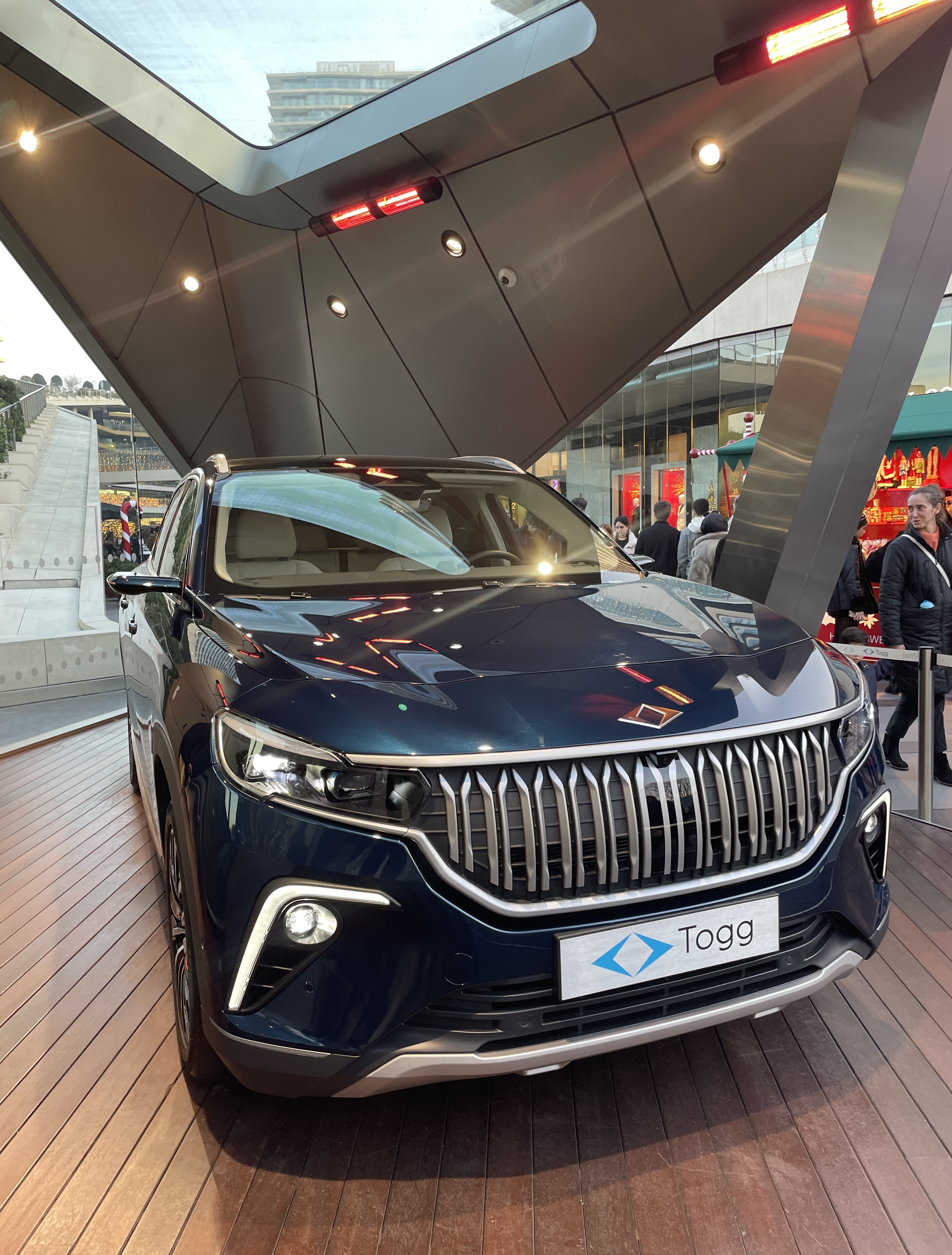
Togg C-SUV produced by Togg, a Turkish automotive company established in 2018 for producing EVs.

Several national, provincial, and local governments around the world have introduced policies to support the mass market adoption of plug-in electric vehicles. A variety of policies have been established to provide direct financial support to consumers and manufacturers; non-monetary incentives; subsidies for the deployment of charging infrastructure; procurement of electric vehicle for government fleets; and long term regulations with specific targets.

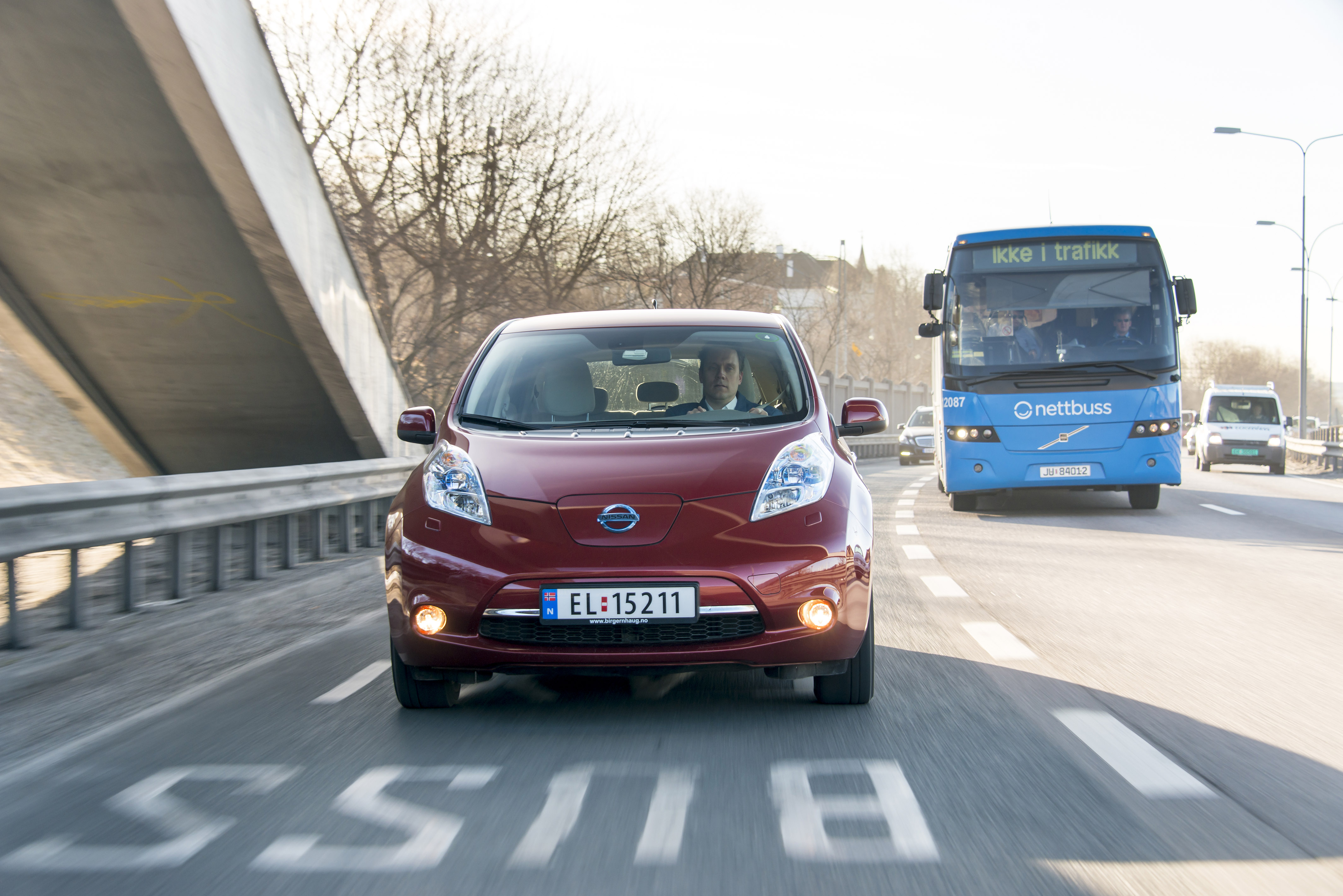
All-electric car on a bus lane in Oslo

Financial incentives for consumers aim to make plug-in electric car purchase price competitive with conventional cars due to the still higher up front cost of electric vehicles. Among the financial incentives there are one-time purchase incentives such as tax credits, purchase grants, exemptions from import duties, and other fiscal incentives; exemptions from road, bridge and tunnel tolls, and from congestion pricing fees; and exemption of registration and annual use vehicle fees. Some countries, like France, also introduced a bonus–malus CO_{2} based tax system that penalize fossil-fuel vehicle sales.

As of 2020, monetary incentives for electrically chargeable vehicles are available, among others, in several European Union member states, China, the United States, the UK, Japan, Norway, some provinces in Canada, South Korea, India, Israel, Colombia, and Costa Rica.

Timeline of national targets for full ICE phase out or 100% ZEV car sales
Selected countries	Year
Norway (100% ZEV sales)	2025
Denmark	2030
Iceland	2030
Ireland	2030
Netherlands (100% ZEV sales)	2030
Sweden	2030
United Kingdom	2040
France	2040
Canada (100% ZEV sales)	2040
Singapore	2040
Sri Lanka (100% HEV or PEV stock)	2040
Germany (100% ZEV sales)	2050
U.S. (only 10 ZEV states)	2050
Japan (100% HEV/PHEV/ZEV sales)	2050
Costa Rica (100% ZEV sales)	2050

Among the non-monetary incentives there are several perks such as allowing plug-in vehicles access to bus lanes and high-occupancy vehicle lanes, free parking and free charging. In addition, in some countries or cities that restrict private car ownership (purchase quota system for new vehicles), or have implemented permanent driving restrictions (no-drive days), the schemes often exclude electric vehicles from the restrictions to promote their adoption.

For example, in Beijing, the license plate lottery scheme specifies a fixed number of vehicle purchase permits each year, but to promote the electrification of its fleet, the city government split the number of purchase permits into two lots, one for conventional vehicles, and another dedicated for all-electric vehicle applicants. In the case of cities with driving alternate-days based on the license plate number, such as San José, Costa Rica, since 2012, São Paulo and Bogotá since 2014, and Mexico City since 2015, all-electric vehicles were excluded from the driving restrictions.

Some governments have also established long-term regulatory signals with specific target timeframes such as ZEV mandates, national or regional CO_{2} emissions regulations, stringent fuel economy standards, and the phase out of internal combustion engine vehicle sales. For example, Norway set a national goal that all new car sales by 2025 should be zero emission vehicles (electric or hydrogen).

Sign for London's Ultra Low Emission Zone (ULEZ). A fee is charged to the most polluting vehicles entering Central London.

Also, some cities are planning to establish zero-emission zones (ZEZ) restricting traffic access into an urban cordon area or city center where only zero-emission vehicles (ZEVs) are allowed access. In such areas, all internal combustion engine vehicles are banned.

As of June 2020, Oxford is slated to be the first city to implement a ZEZ scheme, beginning with a small area scheduled to go into effect by mid-2021. The plan is to expand the clean-air zone gradually into a much larger zone, until the ZEZ encompasses the majority of the city center by 2035.

As of May 2020, other cities planning to gradually introduce ZEZ, or partial or total bans of fossil-fuel-powered vehicles include, among others, Amsterdam (2030), Athens (2025), Barcelona (2030), Brussels (2030/2035), Copenhagen (2030), London (2020/2025), Los Angeles (2030), Madrid (2025), Mexico City (2025), Milan (2030), Oslo (2024/2030), Paris (2024/2030), Quito (2030), Rio de Janeiro (2030), Rome (2024/2030), Seattle (2030), and Vancouver (2030).

== Production plug-in electric vehicles available ==
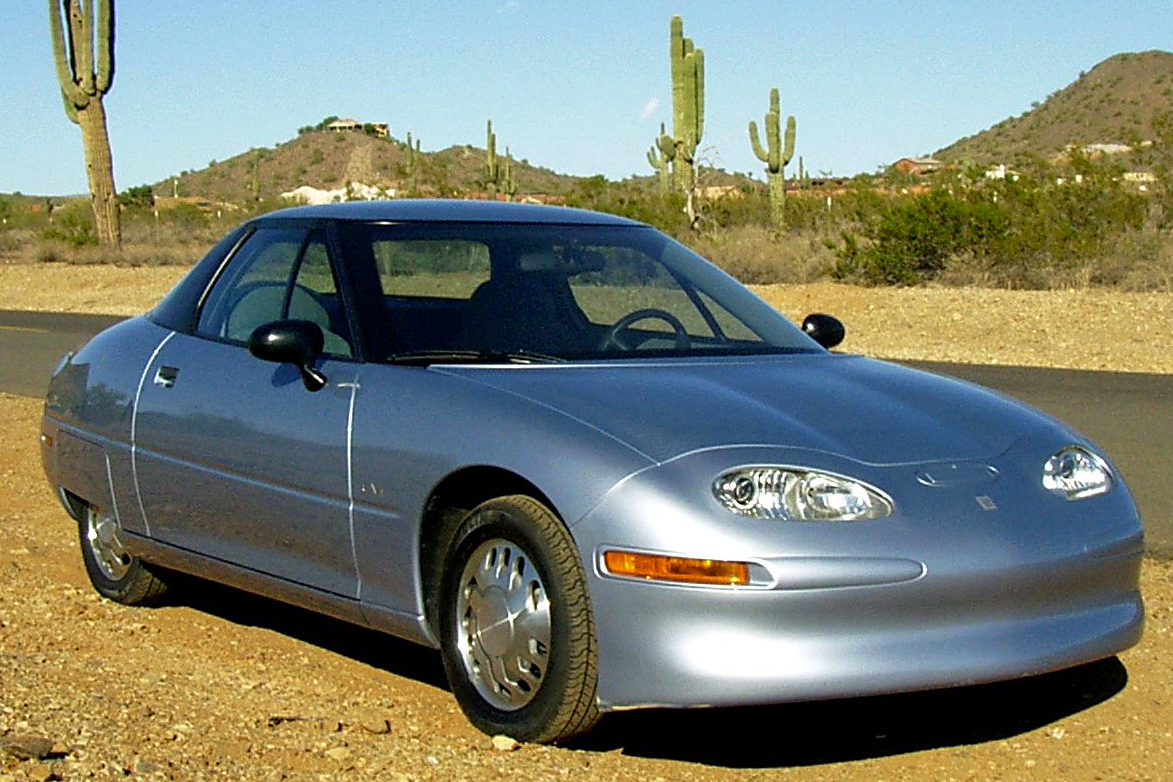
The General Motors EV1 was the first mass-produced and purpose-designed all-electric car of the modern era from a major automaker.

During the 1990s several highway-capable plug-in electric cars were produced in limited quantities, all were battery electric vehicles. PSA Peugeot Citroën launched several electric "Électrique" versions of its models starting in 1991. Other models were available through leasing mainly in California. Popular models included the General Motors EV1 and the Toyota RAV4 EV. Some of the latter were sold to the public and were still in use by the early 2010s.

In the late 2000s began a new wave of mass production plug-in electric cars, motorcycles and light trucks. However, as of 2011, most electric vehicles in the world roads were low-speed, low-range neighborhood electric vehicles (NEVs) or electric quadricycles. Sales of low-speed electric vehicles experienced considerable growth in China between 2012 and 2016, with an estimated NEV stock between 3 million to 4 million units, with most powered by lead-acid batteries.

As of December 2019, according to the International Energy Agency, there were about 250 models of highway-capable plug-in electric passenger cars available for sale in the world, up from 70 in 2014. There are also available several commercial models of electric light commercial vehicles, plug-in motorcycles, all-electric buses, and plug-in heavy-duty trucks.

The Renault–Nissan–Mitsubishi Alliance is the world's leading light-duty electric vehicle manufacturer. Since 2010, the Alliance's global all-electric vehicle sales totaled almost 725,000 units, including those manufactured by Mitsubishi Motors through December 2018, now part of the Alliance. Its best selling all-electric Nissan Leaf was the world's top selling plug-in electric car in 2013 and 2014. Tesla is the world's second largest plug-in electric passenger car manufacturer with global sales since 2012 of over 532,000 units as of December 2018. Its Model S was the world's top selling plug-in car in 2015 and 2016, and its Model 3 was the world's best selling plug-in electric car in 2018.

Ranking next is BYD Auto with more than 529,000 plug-in passenger cars delivered in China through December 2018. Its Qin plug-in hybrid is the company's top selling model with almost 137,000 units sold in China through December 2018. As of December 2018, the BMW Group had sold more than 356,000 plug-in cars since inception of the BMW i3, accounting for global sales its BMW i cars, BMW iPerformance plug-in hybrid models, and MINI brand plug-ins.

BYD Auto ended 2015 as the world's best selling manufacturer of highway legal light-duty plug-in electric vehicles, with 61,722 units sold, followed by Tesla, with 50,580 units. BYD was again the world's top selling plug-in car manufacturer in 2016, with 101,183 units delivered, one more time followed again by Tesla with 76,243 units. In 2017 BYD ranked for the third consecutive year as the global top plug-in car manufacturer with 113,669 units delivered. BAIC ranked second with 104,520 units. The BAIC EC-Series all-electric city car ranked as the world's top selling plug-in car in 2017 with 78,079 units sold in China.

After 10 years in the market, Tesla was the world's top selling plug-in passenger car manufacturer in 2018, both as a brand and by automotive group, with 245,240 units delivered and a market share of 12% of all plug-in cars sold globally in 2018. BYD Auto ranked second with 227,152 plug-in passenger cars sold worldwide, representing a market share of 11%.

In 2025, BYD Auto surpassed Tesla with 2.26 million units sold that year while Tesla reported 1.63 million sold, representing a 9% decrease from 2024. Tesla faces additional competition from Chinese technology firm Xiaomi Corp, which aims to take Tesla on in the luxury electric vehicle market. In January 2026, the Xiaomi YU7 SUV outsold the Tesla Model Y with 37,869 units sold against Tesla's 16,845 Model Y vehicles.

=== Sales and main markets ===
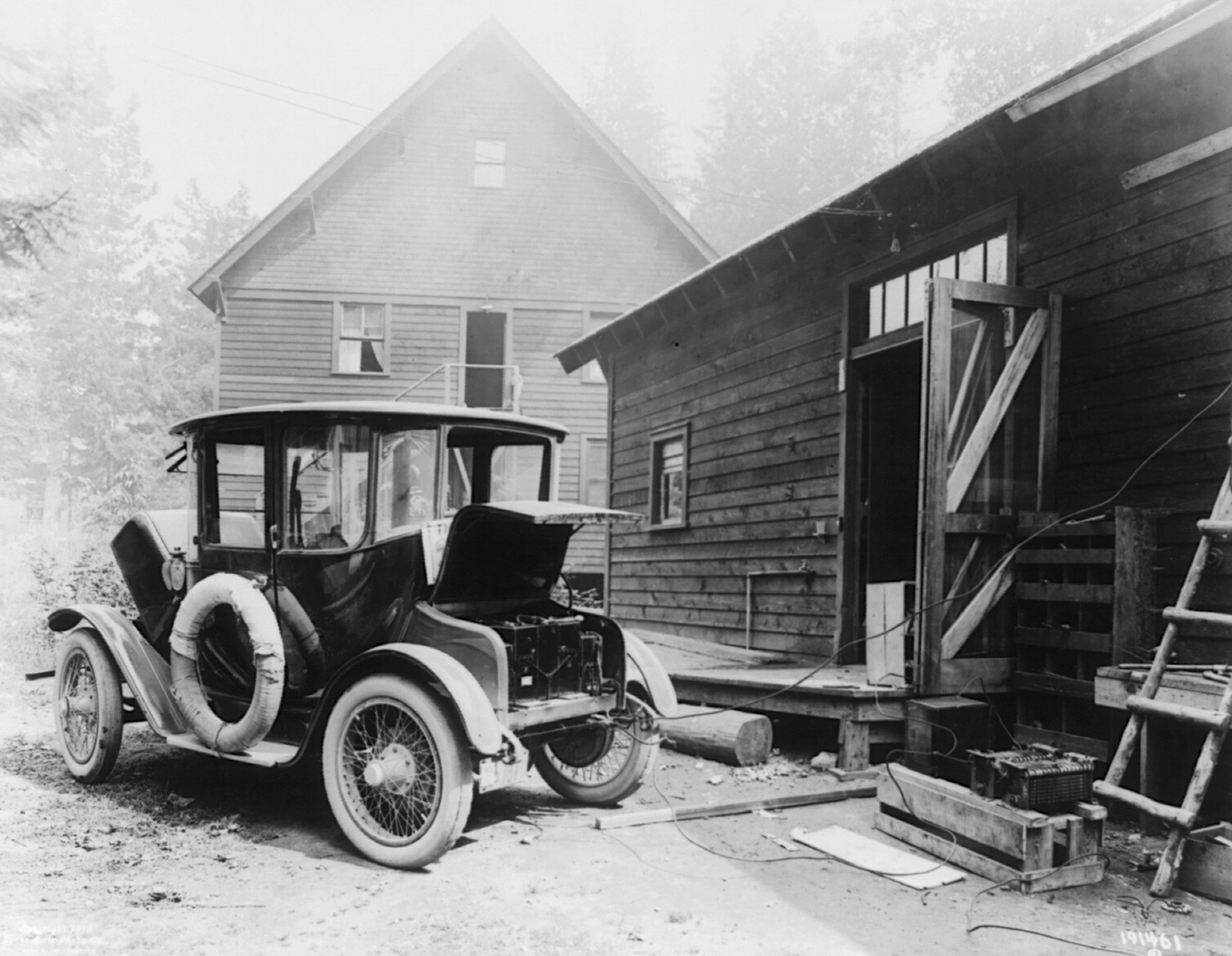
Detroit Electric car charging in 1919. During the Golden Age of the electric car at the beginning of the 20th century, the EV stock peaked at about 30,000 vehicles.

The global stock of plug-in electric vehicles between 2005 and 2009 consisted exclusively of all-electric cars, totaling about 1,700 units in 2005, and almost 6,000 in 2009. The plug-in stock rose to about 12,500 units in 2010, of which, only 350 vehicles were plug-in hybrids. By comparison, during the Golden Age of the electric car at the beginning of the 20th century, the EV stock peaked at approximately 30,000 vehicles.

After the introduction of the first mass-production plug-in cars by major carmakers in late 2010, plug-in car global sales went from about 50,000 units in 2011, to 125,000 in 2012, almost 213,000 in 2013, and over 315,000 units in 2014. By mid-September 2015, the global stock of highway legal plug-in electric passenger cars and utility vans reached the one million sales milestone, almost twice as fast as hybrid electric vehicles (HEV).

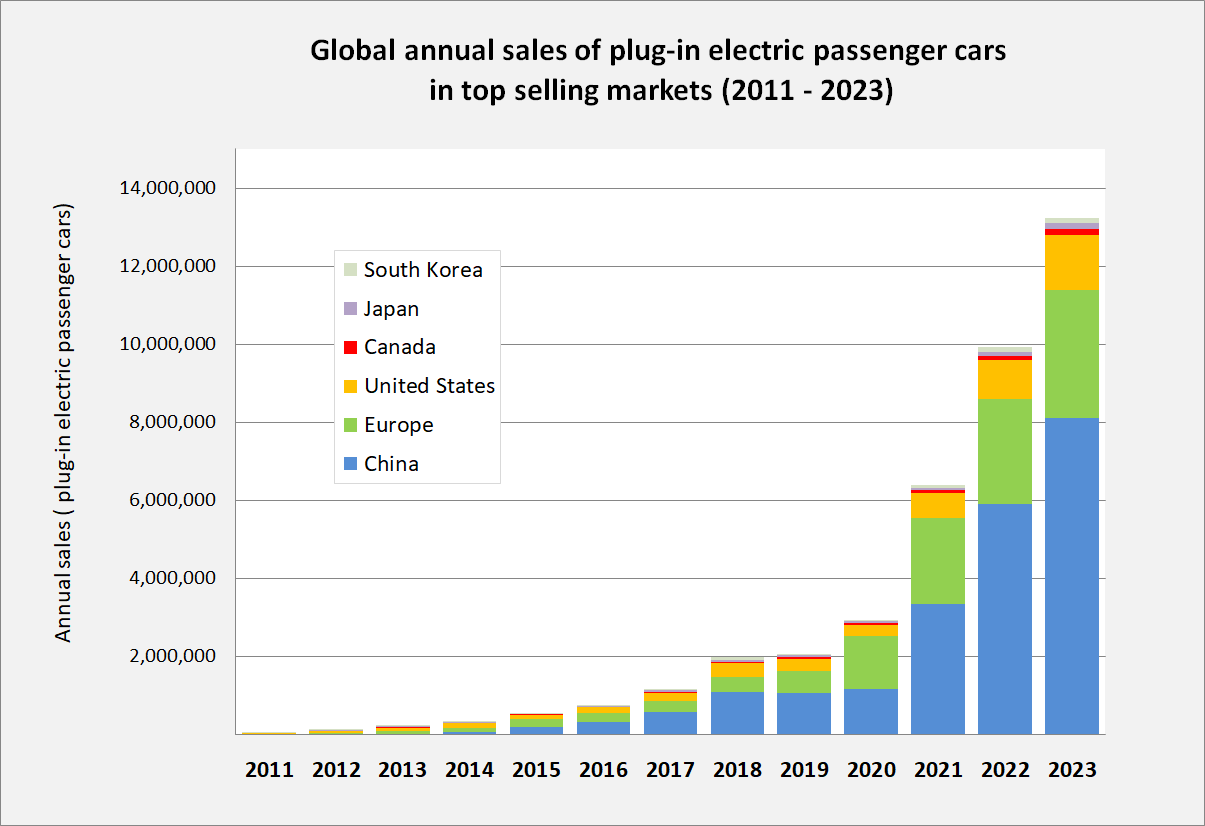
Annual sales of plug-in passenger cars in the world's top markets between 2011 and 2023

Light-duty plug-in electric vehicle sales in 2015 increased to more than 565,000 units in 2015, about 80% from 2014, driven mainly by China and Europe. Both markets passed in 2015 the U.S. as the largest plug-in electric car markets in terms of total annual sales, with China ranking as the world's best-selling plug-in electric passenger car country market in 2015. About 775,000 plug-in cars and vans were sold in 2016, and cumulative global sales passed the 2 million milestone by the end of 2016. The global market share of the light-duty plug-in vehicle segment achieved a record 0.86% of total new car sales in 2016, up from 0.62% in 2015 and 0.38% in 2014.

Cumulative global light-duty plug-in vehicle sales passed the 3 million milestone in November 2017. About 1.2 million plug-ins cars and vans were sold worldwide in 2017, with China accounting for about half of global sales. The plug-in car segment achieved a 1.3% market share. Plug-in passenger car sales totaled just over 2 million in 2018, with a market share of 2.1%. The global stock reached 5.3 million light-duty plug-in vehicles in December 2018.

By the end of 2019 the stock of light-duty plug-in vehicles totaled 7.55 million units, consisting of 4.79 million all-electric cars, 2.38 million plug-in hybrid cars, and 377,970 electric light commercial vehicles. Plug-in passenger cars still represented less than 1% of the world's car fleet in use. In addition, there were about half a million electric buses in circulation in 2019, most of them in China. In 2020, global cumulative sales of light-duty plug-in vehicles passed the 10 million unit milestone.

Despite the rapid growth experienced, the plug-in electric car segment represented just about 1 out of every 250 vehicles on the world's roads by the end of 2018 (0.4%), rose to 1 out of every 200 motor vehicles (0.48%) in 2019, and by the end of 2020, the stock share of plug-in cars on the world's roads was 1%.

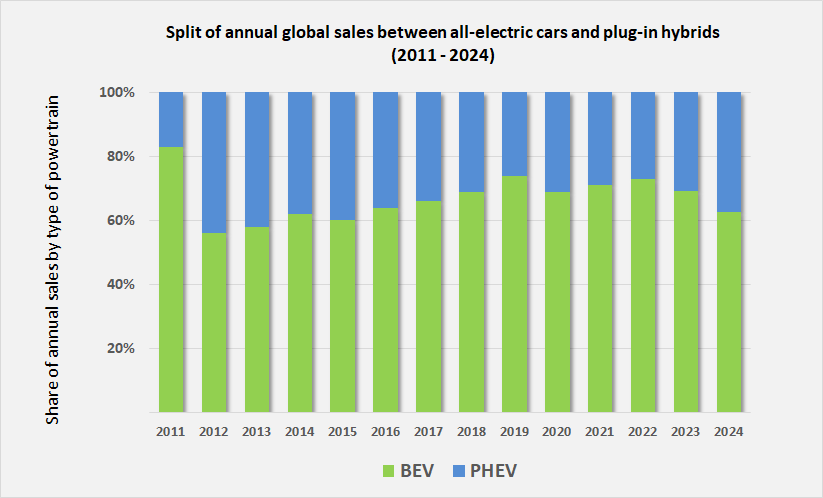
Evolution of the ratio between global sales of BEVs and PHEVs between 2011 and 2024

All-electric cars have outsold plug-in hybrids for several years, and by the end of 2019, the shift towards battery electric cars continued. The global ratio between all-electrics (BEVs) and plug-in hybrids (PHEVs) went from 56:44 in 2012, to 60:40 in 2015, increased to 66:34 in 2017, and rose to 69:31 in 2018, and reached 74:26 in 2019. Out of the 7.2 million plug-in passenger cars in use at the end of 2019, two thirds were all-electric cars (4.8 million).

Since 2016, China has the world's largest fleet of light-duty plug-in electric vehicles, after having overtaken during 2016 both the U.S. and Europe in terms of cumulative sales. The fleet of Chinese plug-in passenger cars represented 46.7% of the global stock of plug-in cars at the end of 2019. Europe listed next with 24.8%, followed by the U.S. with 20.2% of the global stock in use.

As of December 2017, 25 cities accounted for 44% of the world's stock of plug-in electric cars, while representing just 12% of world passenger vehicle sales. Shanghai led the world with cumulative sales of over 162,000 electric vehicles since 2011, followed by Beijing with 147,000 and Los Angeles with 143,000. Among these cities, Bergen has the highest market share of the plug-in segment, with about 50% of new car sales in 2017, followed by Oslo with 40%.

==== China ====
Cumulative sales of new energy vehicles in China between 2011 and 2021

As of December 2021, China had the world's largest stock of highway legal plug-in cars with 7.84 million units, corresponding to about 46% of the global plug-in car fleet in use. Of these, all-electric cars accounted for 81.6% of the all new energy passenger cars in circulation. Plug-in passenger cars represent 2.6% of all cars on Chinese roads at the end of 2021. Domestically produced cars dominate new energy car sales in China, accounting for about 96% of sales in 2017. Another particular feature of the Chinese passenger plug-in market is the dominance of small entry level vehicles.

China also dominates the plug-in light commercial vehicle and electric bus deployment, with its stock reaching over 500,000 buses in 2019, 98% of the global stock, and 247,500 electric light commercial vehicles, 65% of the global fleet. In addition, the country also leads sales of medium- and heavy duty electric trucks, with over 12,000 trucks sold, and nearly all battery electric. Since 2011, combined sales of all classes of new energy vehicles (NEV) totaled almost 5.5 million at the end of 2020.

The BAIC EC-Series all-electric city car was China's the top selling plug-in car in 2017 and 2018, and also the world's top selling plug-in car in 2017. BYD Auto was the world's top selling car manufacturer in 2016 and 2017. In 2020, the Tesla Model 3 listed as the best-selling plug-in car with 137,459 units.

==== Europe ====
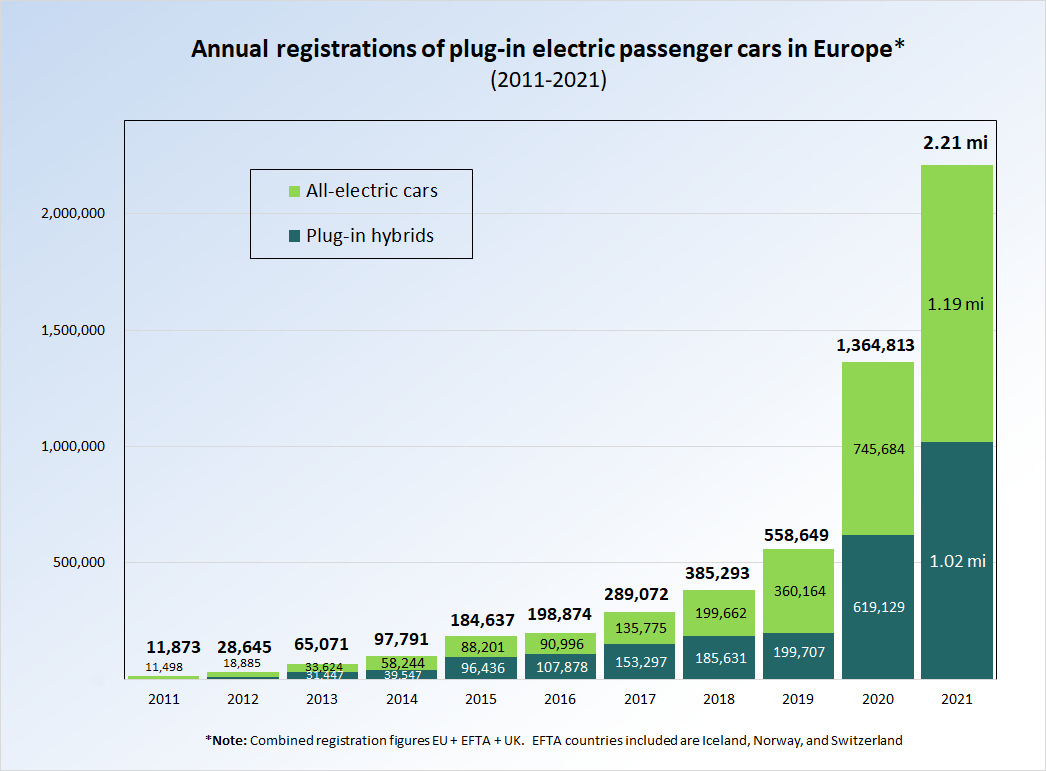
Evolution of annual registrations of plug-in electric passenger cars in Europe, 2011–2021

Europe had about 5.67 million plug-in electric passenger cars and light commercial vehicles in circulation at the end of 2021, consisting of 2.9 million fully electric passenger cars, 2.5 million plug-in hybrid cars, and about 220,000 light commercial all-electric vehicles. The European stock of plug-in passenger is the world's second largest market after China, accounting for 30% of the global car stock in 2020. Europe also has the second largest electric light commercial vehicle stock, 33% of the global stock in 2019.

In 2020, and despite the strong decline in global car sales brought by the COVID-19 pandemic, annual sales of plug-in passenger cars in Europe surpassed the 1 million mark for the first time. In addition, Europe outsold China in 2020 as the world's largest plug-in passenger car market for the first time since 2015.

The plug-in car segment had a market share of 1.3% of new car registrations in 2016, rose to 3.6% in 2019, and achieved 11.4% in 2020. The largest country markets in the European region in terms of EV stock and annual sales are Germany, Norway, France, the UK, the Netherlands, and Sweden. Germany surpassed Norway in 2019 as the best selling plug-in market, leading both the all-electric and the plug-in hybrid segments in Europe. and in 2020 listed as the top selling European country market for the second consecutive year.

===== Germany =====
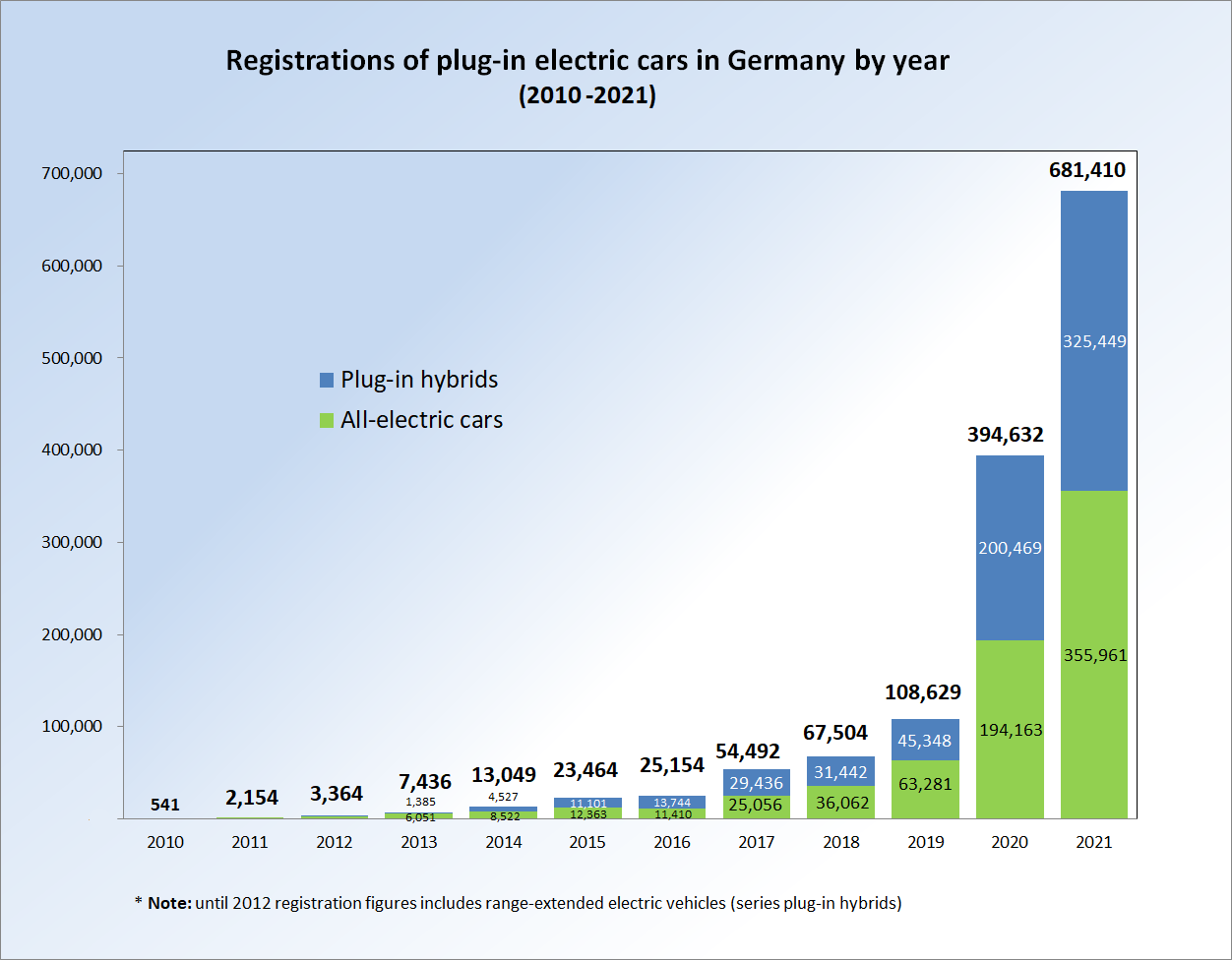
Annual registration of plug-in electric cars in Germany by type of powertrain between 2010 and 2021

The stock of plug-in electric cars in Germany is the largest in Europe, there were 1,184,416 plug-in cars in circulation on January 1, 2022, representing 2.5% of all passenger cars on German roads, up from 1.2% the previous year. As of December 2021, cumulative sales totaled 1.38 million plug-in passenger cars since 2010. Germany had a stock of 21,890 light-duty electric commercial vehicles in 2019, the second largest in Europe after France.

Germany listed as the top selling plug-in car market in the European continent in 2019 and achieved a market share of 3.10%. Despite the global decline in car sales brought by the COVID-19 pandemic, the segment market share achieved a record 13.6% in 2020. with a record volume of 394,632 plug-in passenger cars registered in 2020, up 263% from 2019, allowing Germany to be listed for a second year running as the best selling European plug-in market. Both years, the German market led both the fully electric and plug-in hybrid segments.

Despite to the continued global decline in car sales brought by the shortages related to the COVID-19 pandemic, and computer chips in particular, a record 681,410 plug-in electric passenger cars were registered in Germany in 2021, consisting of 325,449 plug-in hybrids and 355,961 all-electric cars, allowing the segment's market share to surge to 26.0%.

===== France =====
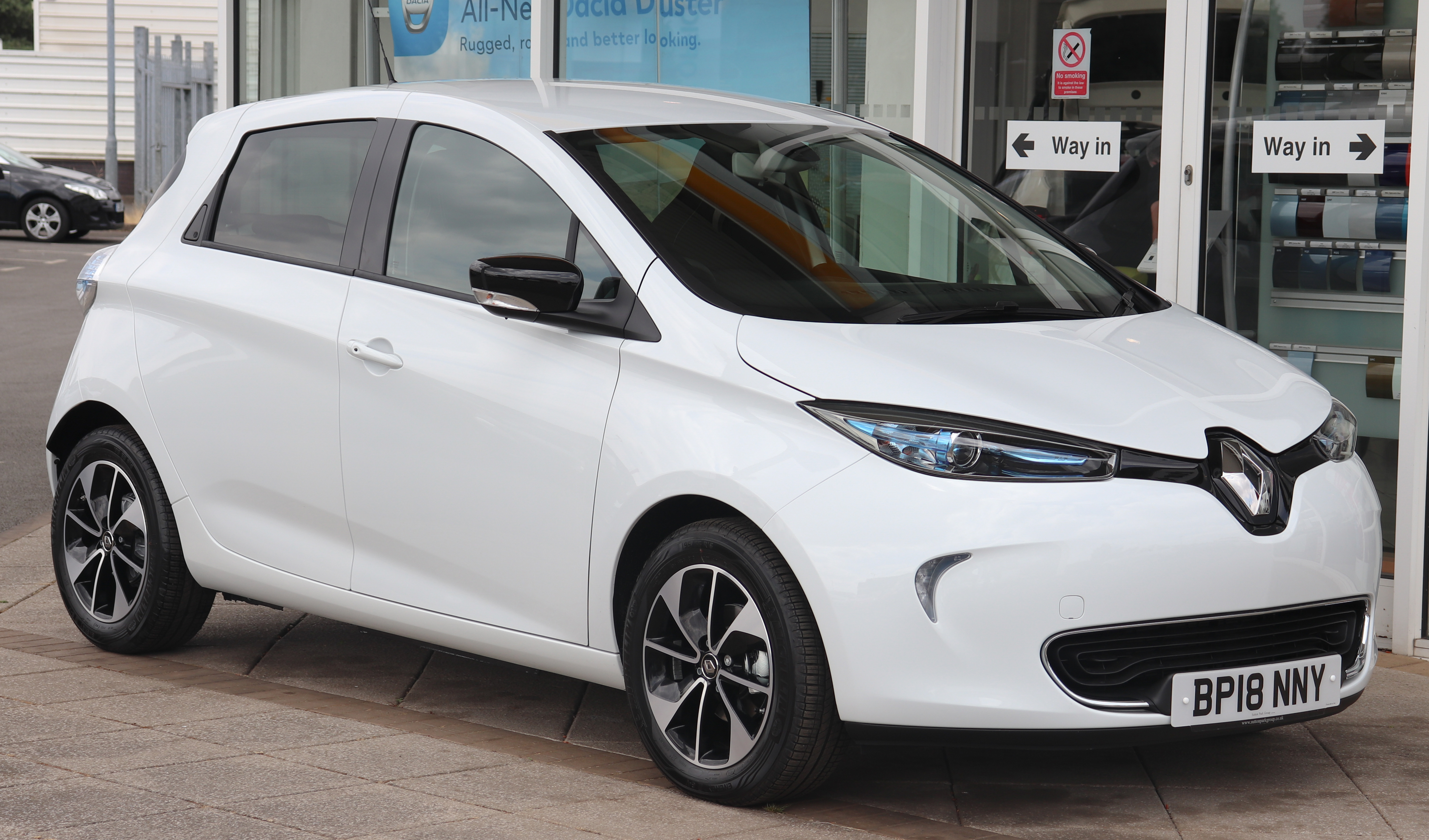
The Renault Zoe is the country's all-time best selling plug-in electric car with over 100,000 units delivered since inception through June 2020.

As of December 2021, a total of 786,274 light-duty plug-in electric vehicles have been registered in France since 2010, consisting of 512,178 all-electric passenger cars and commercial vans, and 274,096 plug-in hybrids. Of these, over 60,000 were all-electric light commercial vehicles.

The market share of all-electric passenger cars increased from 0.30% of new car registered in 2012, to 0.59% in 2014. After the introduction of the super-bonus for the scrappage of old diesel-power cars in 2015, sales of both pure electric cars and plug-in hybrids surged, rising the market share to 1.17% in 2015, climbed to 2.11% in 2018, and achieved 2.8% in 2019.

Despite the global strong decline in car sales brought by the COVID-19 pandemic, and the related global computer chip shortage, plug-in electric car sales in France rose to a record of 315,978 light-duty plug-in vehicles in 2021, up 62% from 2020. The plug-in electric passenger car market share rose to 11.2% in 2020 and achieved a record market share of 18.3% in 2021. The combined light-duty plug-in vehicle segment (cars and utility vans) achieved a market share of 15.1% in 2021.

As of December 2019, France ranked as the country with the world's second largest stock of light-duty electric commercial vehicles after China, with 49,340 utility vans in use. The market share of all-electric utility vans reached a market share of 1.22% in 2014, and 1.77% in 2018.

===== United Kingdom =====
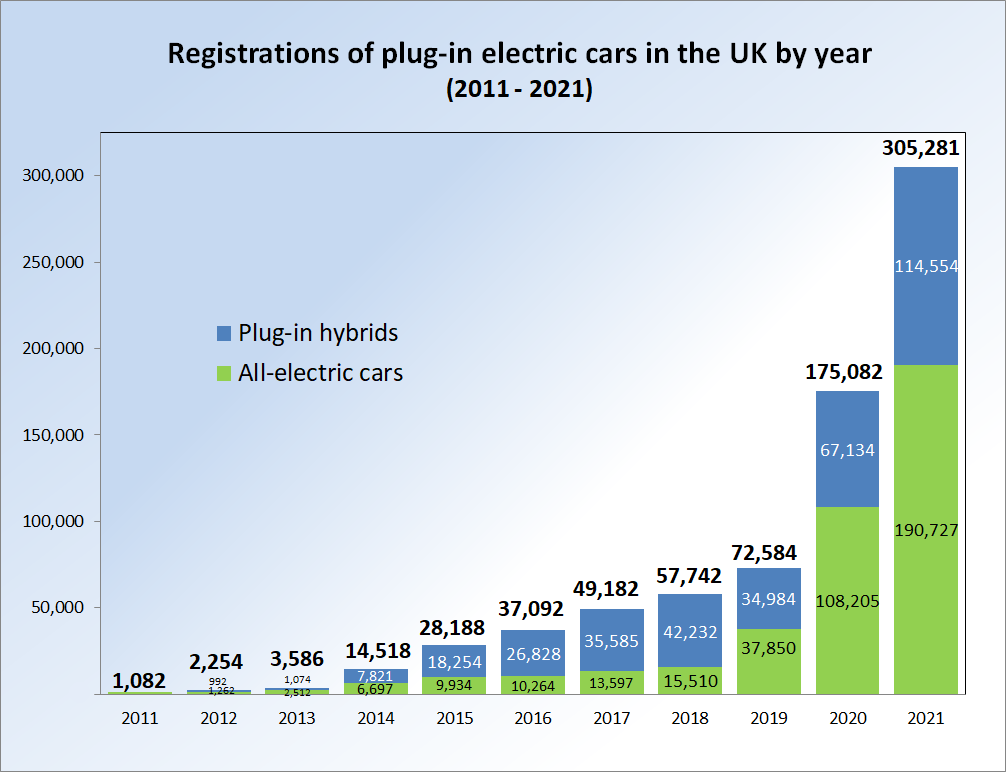
Registration of plug-in electric cars in the UK between 2011 and 2021

About 745,000 light-duty plug-in electric vehicles had been registered in the UK up until December 2021, consisting of 395,000 all-electric vehicles and 350,000 plug-in hybrids.

A surge of plug-in car sales took place in Britain beginning in 2014. Total registrations went from 3,586 in 2013, to 37,092 in 2016, and rose to 59,911 in 2018. Again sales surged to 175,339 units in 2020, despite the global strong decline in car sales brought by the COVID-19 pandemic, and achieved record sales of 305,281 units in 2021.

The market share of the plug-in segment went from 0.16% in 2013 to 0.59% in 2014, and achieved 2.6% in 2018. The segment market share was 3.1% in 2019, rose to 10.7% in 2020, and achieved a record 18.6% in 2021.

As of June 2020, the Mitsubishi Outlander P-HEV is the all-time top selling plug-in car in the UK over 46,400 units registered, followed by the Nissan Leaf more than 31,400 units.

===== Norway =====
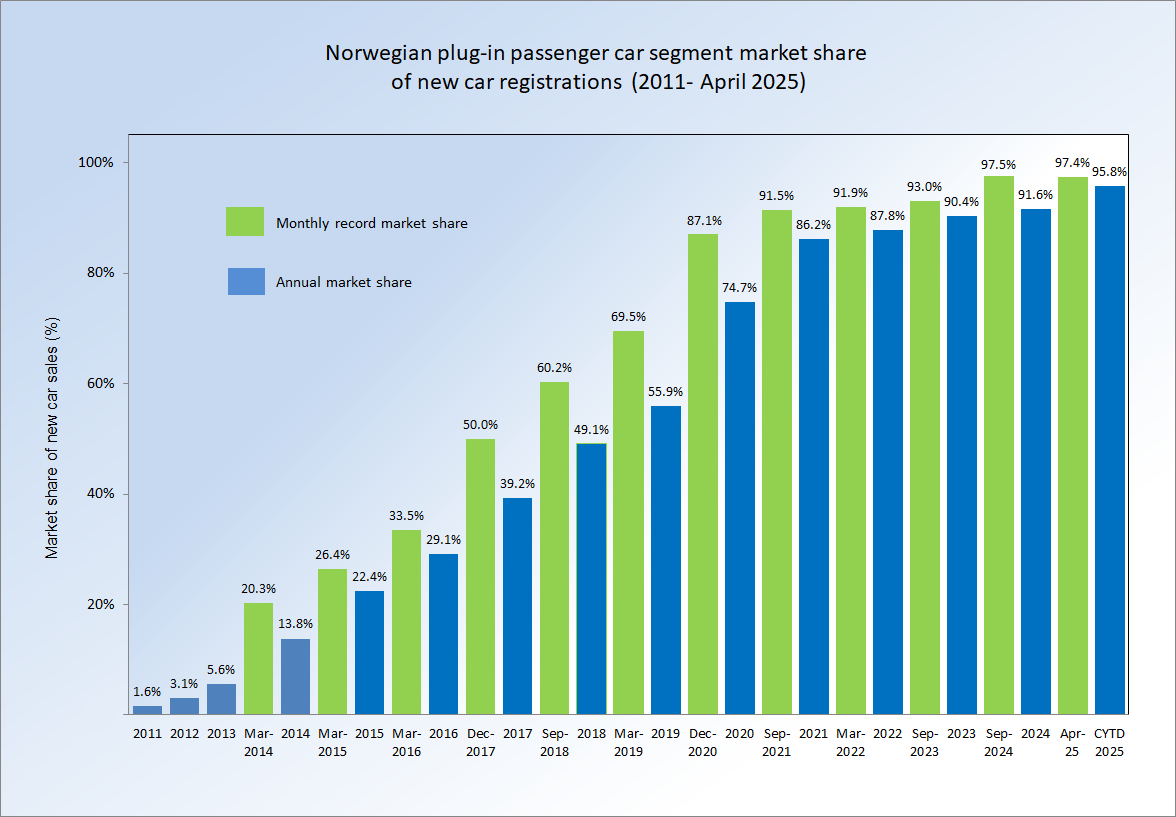
Historical evolution of the Norwegian plug-in electric car segment market share of new car sales and monthly records, 2011–April 2025 (Source: OFV)

As of 31 December 2021, the stock of light-duty plug-in electric vehicles in Norway totaled 647,000 units in use, consisting of 470,309 all-electric passenger cars and vans (including used imports), and 176,691 plug-in hybrids. Norway was the top selling plug-in country market in Europe for three consecutive years, from 2016 to 2018. Until 2019, Norway listed as the European country with the largest stock of plug-in cars and vans, and the third largest in the world.

The Norwegian plug-in car segment market share has been the highest in the world for several years, reaching 39.2% in 2017, up from 29.1% in 2016, 49.1% in 2018, rose to 55.9% in 2019, and reached 74.7% in 2020, meaning that three out of every four new passenger car sold in Norway in 2020 was a plug-in electric. In September 2021, the combined market share of the plug-in car segment achieved a new record of 91.5% of new passenger car registrations, 77.5% for all-electric cars and 13.9% for plug-in hybrids, becoming the world's highest-ever monthly plug-in car market share attained by any country. The plug-in segment market share rose to 86.2% in 2021.

In October 2018, Norway became the first country where 1 in every 10 passenger cars in use was a plug-in electric vehicle. and by the end of 2021, plug-in electric cars were 22.1% of all passenger cars on Norwegian roads. The country's fleet of plug-in electric cars is one of the cleanest in the world because 98% of the electricity generated in the country comes from hydropower. Norway is the country with the largest EV ownership per capita in the world.

===== Netherlands =====
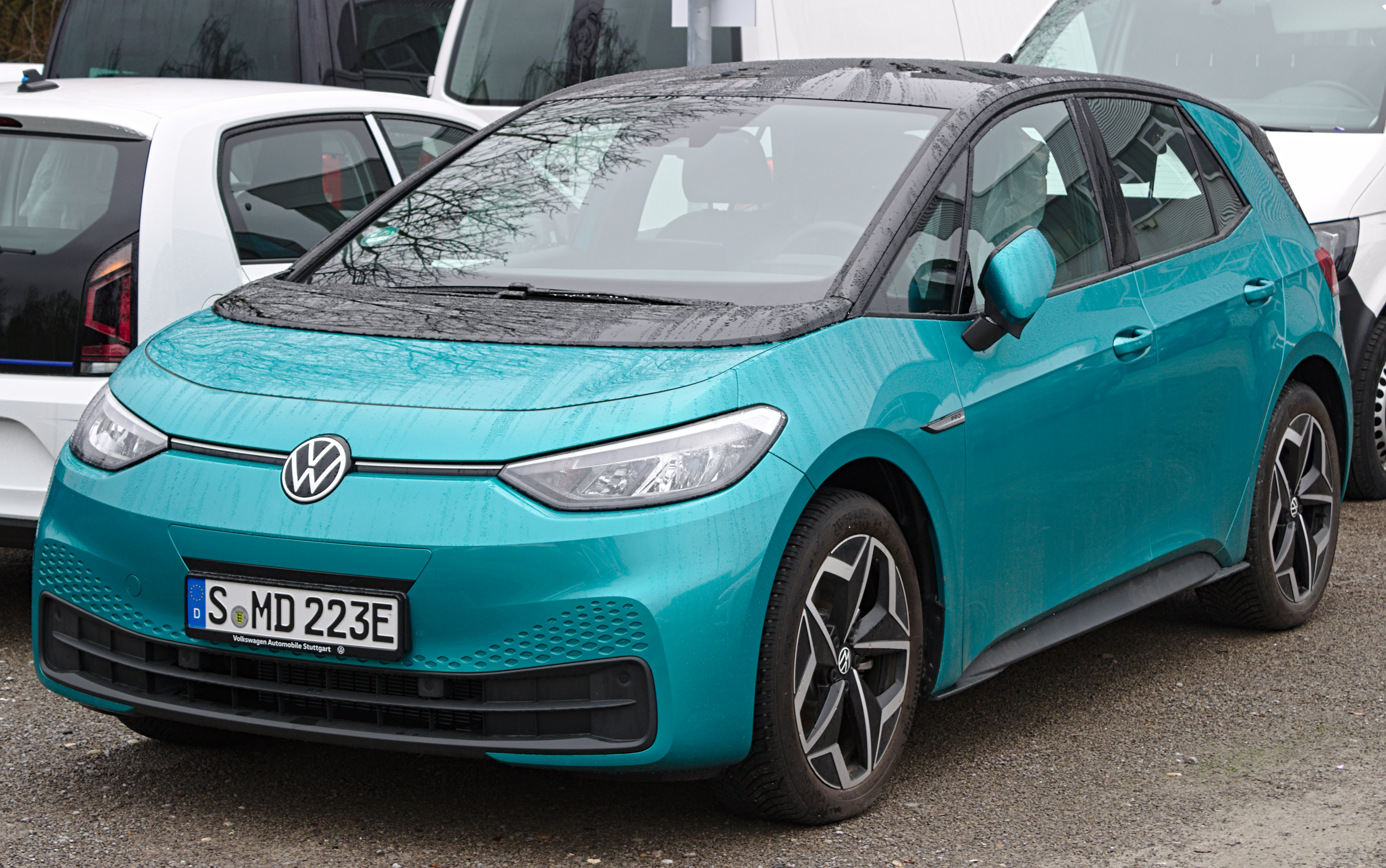
The Volkswagen ID.3 was the best selling plug-in car in the Netherlands in 2020.

As of 31 December 2021, there were 390,454 highway-legal light-duty plug-in electric vehicles in use in the Netherlands, consisting of 137,663 fully electric cars, 243,664 plug-in hybrid cars and 9,127 light duty plug-in commercial vehicles. Plug-in passenger cars represented 4.33% of all cars on Dutch roads at the end of 2021.

As of July 2016, the Netherlands had the second largest plug-in ownership per capita in the world after Norway. Plug-in sales fell sharply in 2016 due to changes in tax rules, and as a result of the change in government's incentives, the plug-in market share declined from 9.9% in 2015, to 6.7% in 2016, and fell to 2.6% in 2017. The intake rate rose to 6.5% in 2018 in anticipation of another change in tax rules that went into effect in January 2019, and increased to 14.9% in 2019, and rose 24.6% in 2020, and achieved a record 29.8% in 2021.

==== United States ====
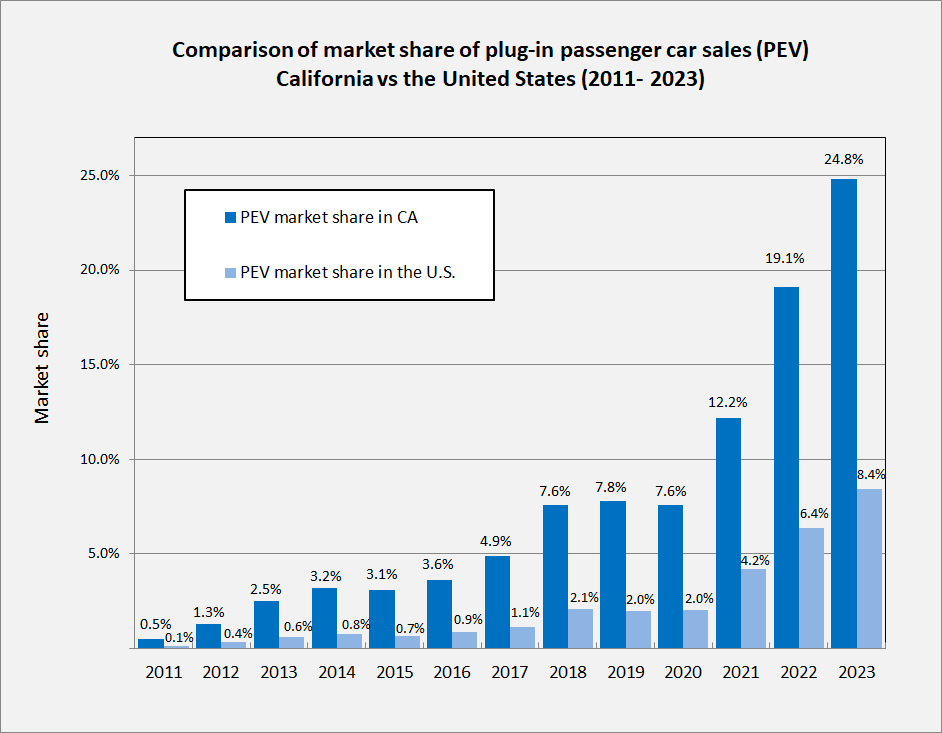
Comparison of plug-in car market shares in California vs the American market (2011–2023)

As of December 2023, cumulative sales of highway legal plug-in electric passenger cars in the U.S. totaled 4,684,128 units since 2010. The U.S. has the world's third largest stock of plug-in passenger cars, after having been overtaken by Europe in 2015 and China during 2016. California is the largest plug-in regional market in the country, with 1 million plug-in cars sold in California by November 2021.

The Tesla Model 3 electric car has been the best selling plug-in car in the U.S. for two consecutive years, 2018 and 2019. Cumulative sales of the Model 3 surpassed in 2019 the discontinued Chevrolet Volt plug-in hybrid to become the all-time best selling plug-in car in the country, with an estimated 300,471 units delivered since inception, followed by the Tesla Model S all-electric car with about 157,992, and the Chevrolet Volt with 157,054.

==== Japan ====
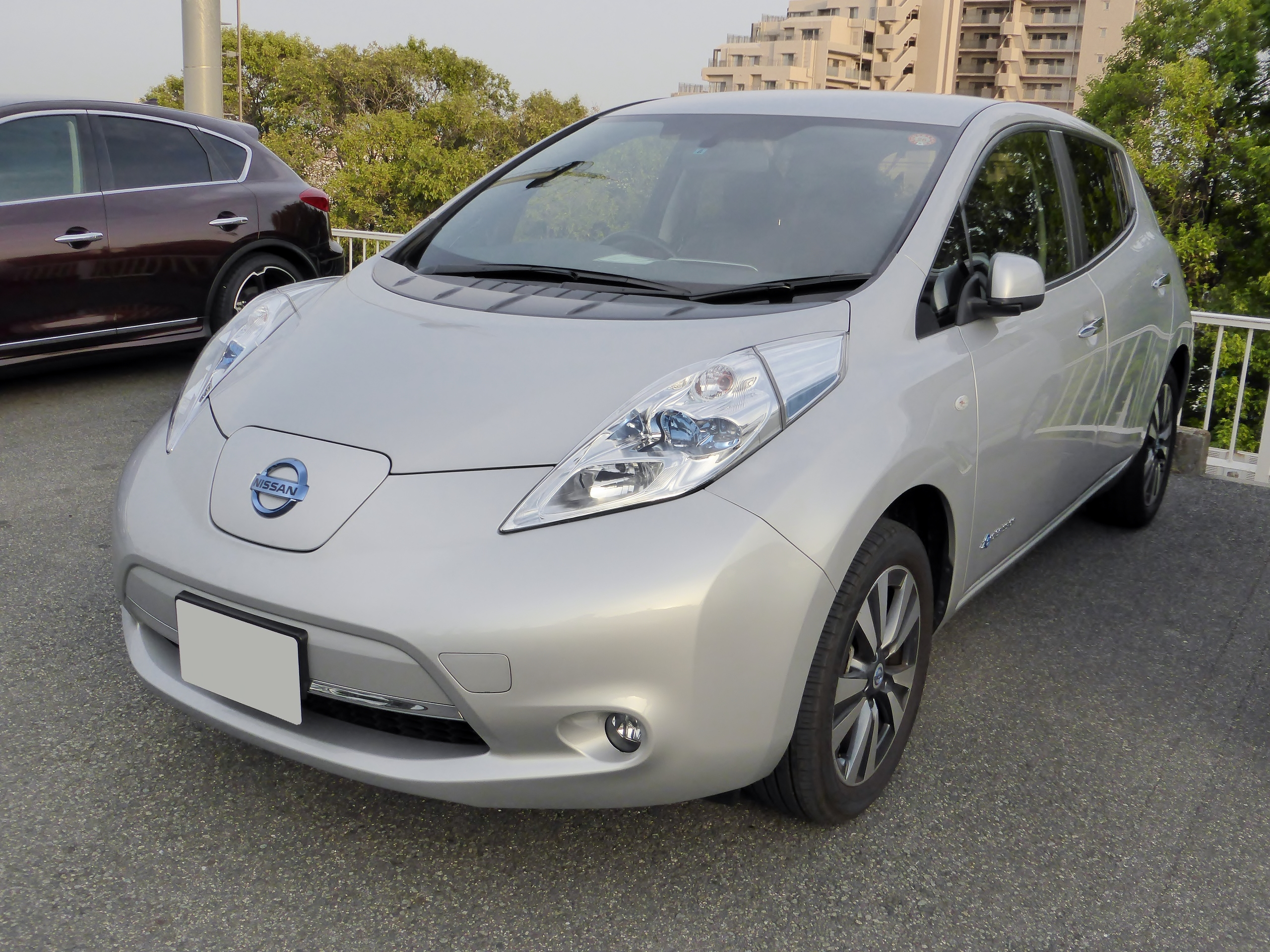
As of April 2018, the Nissan Leaf was listed as the all-time top selling plug-in car in Japan, with 100,000 units delivered.

As of December 2020, Japan had a stock of plug-in passenger cars of 293,081 units on the road, consisting of 156,381 all-electric cars and 136,700 plug-in hybrids. The fleet of electric light commercial vehicles in use totaled 9,904 units in 2019.

Plug-in sales totaled 24,660 units in 2015 and 24,851 units in 2016. The rate of growth of the Japanese plug-in segment slowed down from 2013, with annual sales falling behind Europe, the U.S. and China during 2014 and 2015. The segment market share fell from 0.68% in 2014 to 0.59% in 2016. Sales recovered in 2017, with almost 56,000 plug-in cars sold, and the segment's market share reached 1.1%. Sales fell slightly in 2018 to 52,000 units with a market share of 1.0%. The market share continued declining to 0.7% in 2019 and 0.6% in 2020.

The decline in plug-in car sales reflects the Japanese government and the major domestic carmakers decision to adopt and promote hydrogen fuel cell vehicles instead of plug-in electric vehicles.

== See also ==
- Electric car
- Electric car use by country
- Electric vehicle battery
- Electric vehicle warning sounds
- Hybrid tax credit (U.S.)
- List of electric cars currently available
- List of modern production plug-in electric vehicles
- Plug In America
- RechargeIT (Google.org PHEV program)
- Renewable energy by country

== Books ==
- David B. Sandalow, ed. (2009). Plug-In Electric Vehicles: What Role for Washington? (1st. ed.). The Brookings Institution. ISBN 978-0-8157-0305-1.
- Mitchell, William J.; Borroni-Bird, Christopher; Burns, Lawrence D. (2010). Reinventing the Automobile: Personal Urban Mobility for the 21st Century (1st. ed.). The MIT Press. ISBN 978-0-262-01382-6. Archived from the original on 2010-06-09.
