= RechargeIT =

Initiative within Google.org

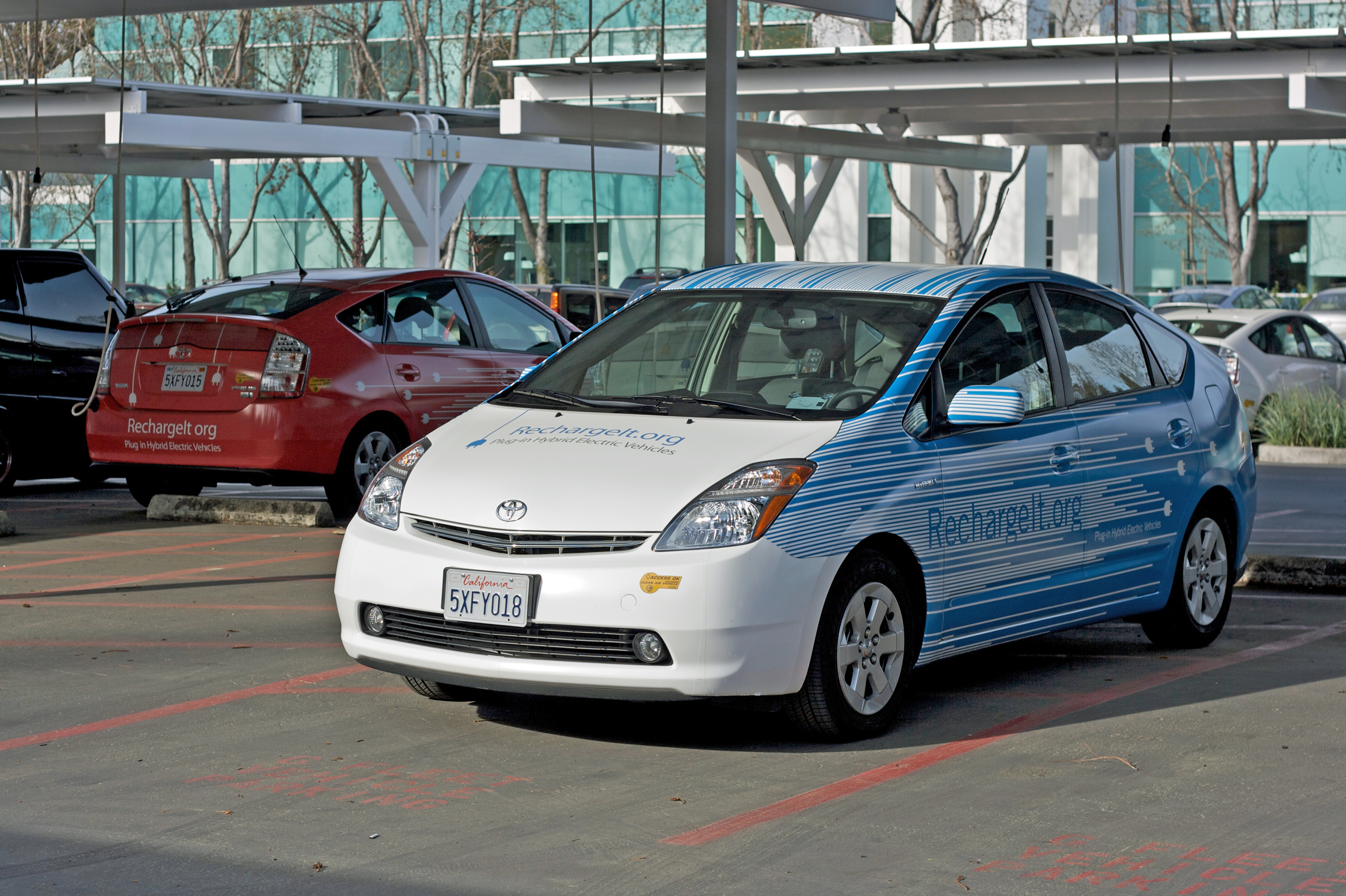
RechargeIT plug-in hybrids converted Toyota Prius at Google's Mountain View campus.

RechargeIT is one of five initiatives within Google.org, the charitable arm of Google, created with the aim to reduce CO_{2} emissions, cut oil use, and stabilize the electrical grid by accelerating the adoption of plug-in electric vehicles. Google.org's official RechargeIT blog has not been updated since 2008.

== History ==
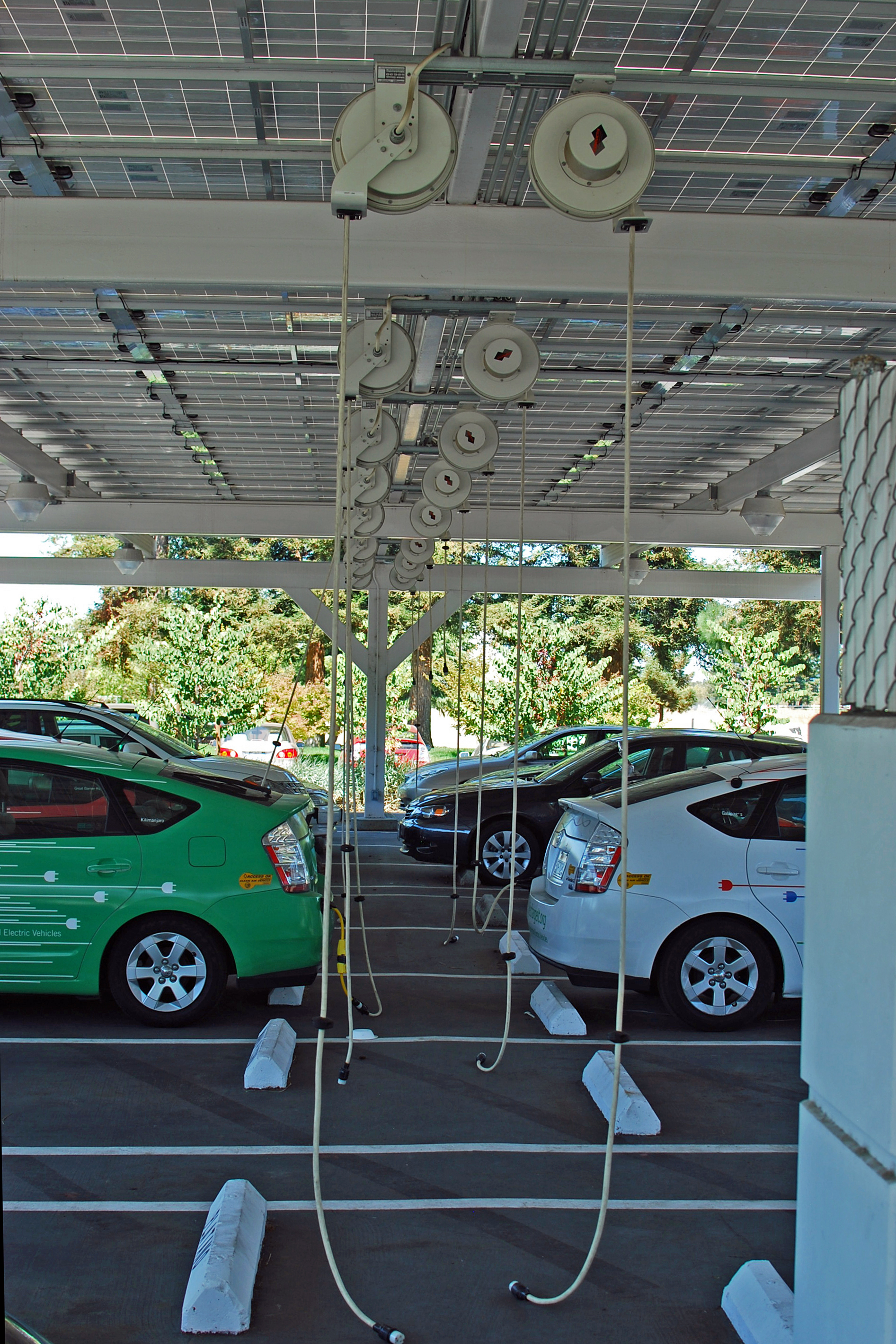
RechargeIT charging stations available in the garage designated for converted plug-in hybrids at Google's Mountain View campus.

The RechargeIT initiative was unveiled in June 2007. As part of the program Google.org awarded US$1 million in grants and announced plans for a US$10 million request for proposals to fund development, adoption and commercialization of plug-in hybrids, fully electric cars and related vehicle-to-grid (V2G) technology. As part of the program Google established a partnership with Pacific Gas and Electric Co. to develop software for energy management.

Together with the announcement of the initiative, Google also announced that it had switched on the solar panel installation at its Mountain View, California headquarters in order to help the company reduce its environmental footprint and also to power its plug-ins with clean solar electricity. At 1.6 megawatts the project became the largest solar installation at that time on any corporate campus in the U.S. and one of the largest on any corporate site in the world.

The actual rollout of the initiative took place in January 2008.

== Google's carsharing program ==
By early 2010 Google's Mountain View campus had 100 available charging stations for its share-use fleet of converted plug-in hybrids available to its employees through a free carsharing program and for those employees who drive to work in their Tesla Roadster (2008) electric cars. Solar panels are used to generate the electricity, and this pilot program is being monitored on a daily basis and performance results are published on RechargeIT's website.

== Driving experiment ==
In addition to the data collected for two years when the converted plug-ins were driven by Google employees, RechargeIT set up a controlled test using three conventional gasoline vehicles, two regular hybrids and two plug-in converted Ford Escape Hybrid and Toyota Prius. The results of the seven-week driving experiment for the converted Prius plug-in showed an average fuel economy of 93.5 miles per US gallon (2.52 L/100 km; 112.3 mpg_{‑imp}) across all trips, and 115.1 miles per US gallon (2.044 L/100 km; 138.2 mpg_{‑imp}) for city trips, the maximum reached for any of the driving conditions tested. A summary of the results of the seven-week driving experiment are the following

RechargeIT Driving Experiment results Average miles per gallon
	Internal combustion engine			Hybrid electric		Converted Plug-in hybrid	
Type of trip	Ford Expedition	Toyota Sienna	Toyota Corolla	Ford Escape Hybrid	Toyota Prius	Ford Escape Hybrid plug-in	Toyota Prius plug-in
Average for all trips	14.2	20.3	30.8	32.2	48.4	49.1	93.5
Average for city trips	11.8	17.8	26.6	31.2	47.3	45.9	115.1
Average for combine city/highway	14.9	20.4	31.4	31.6	46.4	52.0	101.9
Average for highway trips	18.6	25.2	39.0	34.4	53.1	51.1	68.7

== GFleet and employee shuttles ==
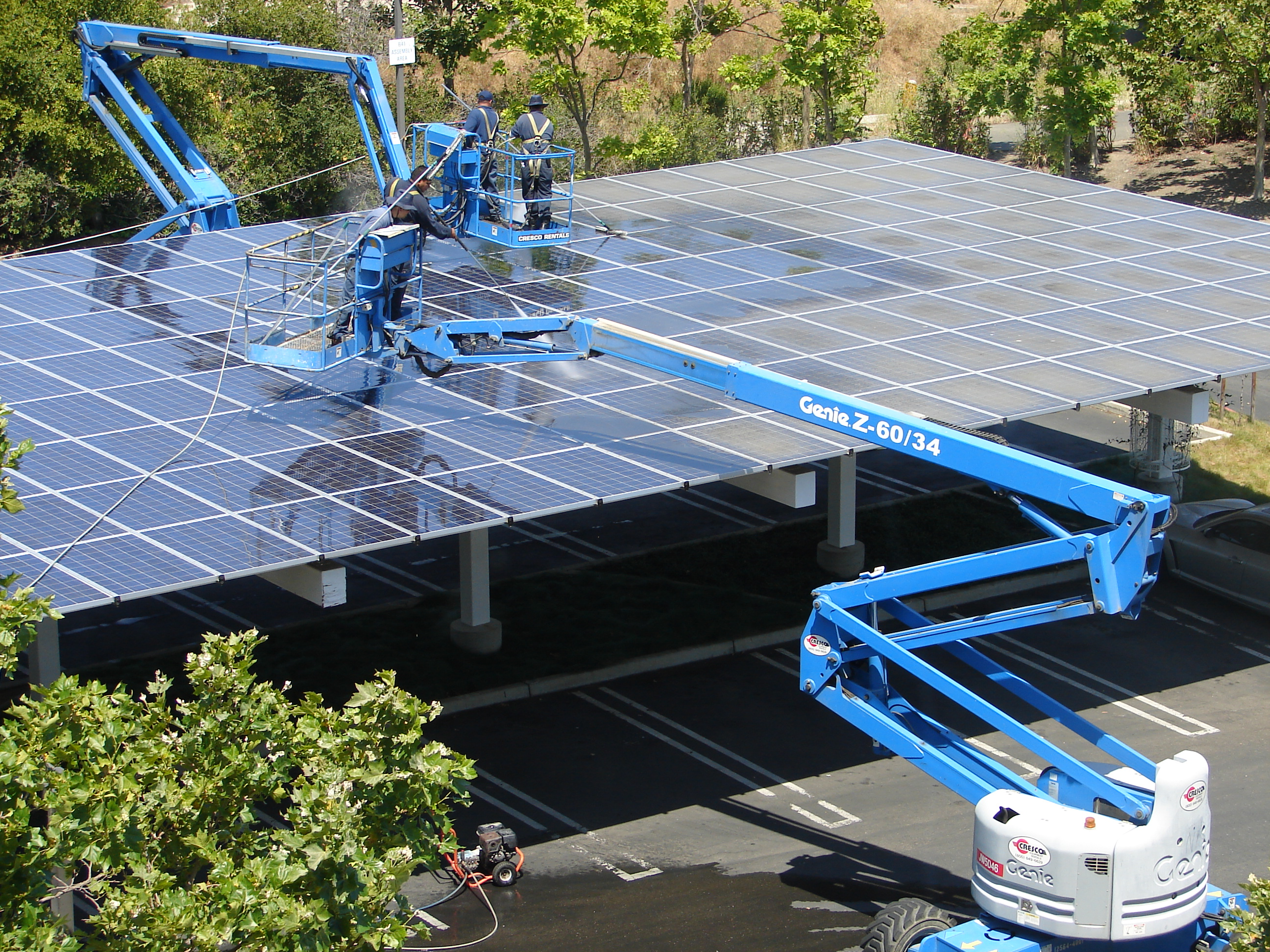
Cleaning of solar panels used to power the car ports at Googleplex.

In order to reduce the carbon footprint of its employees' commute and based on the results of the RechargeIT pilot, the company expanded its corporate carsharing program to create Google GFleet and also introduced shuttle buses powered with biodiesel. In addition, more charging stations were deployed at the Googleplex for employees owning plug-in electric vehicles.

The initial GFleet was made of the converted plug-in hybrids from the RechargeIT initiative, and by mid-2011 Nissan Leafs and Chevrolet Volts were added, expanding the carsharing corporate fleet to more than 30 plug-in electric vehicles. In December 2011, the first production Ford Focus Electric was delivered to Google and incorporated into the GFleet. By early 2012, Honda Fit EVs and Mitsubishi i-MiEVs have also been added to the GFleet. The Fit EV was incorporated as part of Honda's field testing program of its upcoming electric car. Through the partnership Google will analyze the vehicle environmental performance including CO_{2} reduction, energy consumption and overall energy cost.

Employees who use the biodiesel shuttle system to commute to work at Mountain View, have the GFleet vehicles available for their errands, off-site meetings, and emergencies. Employees can also use GBikes, Google's on-campus bike fleet. As of June 2011, a total of 71 Level 2 chargers were added to the existing 150 Level 1 chargers, bringing the Googleplex total capacity to more than 200 chargers, and another 250 new ones are scheduled to be installed. Google's goal is to electrify 5 percent of the parking spaces—all over campus, free of charge to its employees.

Daily, up to a third of Bay Area employees take the shuttle to work. The corporate coach fleet exceeds the United States Environmental Protection Agency's 2010 bus emission standards. The buses run on 5% biodiesel and are fitted with filtration systems that eliminate many harmful emissions, including nitrogen oxide. Google is testing solar panels on some to power air circulation, so that shuttles can turn off their engines while they wait for passengers, thus reducing fuel use and emissions. As of mid-2011, Google estimated that its Gfleet and biodiesel shuttle system resulted in net annual savings of more than 5,400 tonnes of CO_{2}, the equivalent of taking over 2,000 cars per day off the road, or avoiding 14 million vehicle miles every year.

== See also ==
- Better Place
- CalCars
- Google driverless car
- Google PowerMeter
- Plug-in electric vehicles in California
- Plug-in electric vehicles in the United States
- United States energy independence
