= Plug-in electric vehicles in California =

Cumulative plug-in electric car sales in California compared to the world's top-selling countries and regional markets as of December 2021

The stock of plug-in electric vehicles in California is the largest in the United States, and as of December 2023, cumulative plug-in car registrations in the state since 2010 totaled 1.77 million units. Between November 2016 and until 2020, China was the only country market that exceeded California in terms of cumulative plug-in electric car sales.

California's plug-in car market share reached 4.9% in 2017, while the national share was 1.1%. Also in 2017, the state's plug-in segment market share surpassed the take-rate of conventional hybrids (4.6%) for the first time. The plug-in market share rose to 7.6% in 2018, and for the first time sales of all-electric cars outsold conventional hybrids. The plug-in market share remained the same in 2019, rose to 8.1% in 2020, and achieved 12.8% in 2021. The Tesla Model 3 topped plug-in car sales in California for three years running, from 2018 to 2020. The Tesla Model Y was the best selling plug-in car in the state in 2021, and second in the overall car market.

The Government of California has been actively supporting the adoption of plug-in electric vehicles (PEVs), and zero-emission vehicles in general, and has in place several financial and non-financial incentives to increase their market penetration. California reached 1.5 million zero-emission vehicles (ZEVs) in April 2023. In January 2018, Governor Brown set a new goal of getting a total of 5 million zero-emission vehicles in California by 2030.

As part of the state's government incentives, in addition to the existing federal tax credit, plug-in electric vehicles (PEVs) and fuel cell electric vehicles (FCV) are eligible for a purchase rebate of up to US$4,000 through the Clean Vehicle Rebate Project (CVRP). Applicants who owned battery electric vehicles or plug-in hybrids meeting California's Enhanced Advanced Technology Partial Zero Emission Vehicle (Enhanced AT PZEV) were entitled to a clean air sticker up until October 1, 2025.

== Government policy ==
=== ZEV regulation ===
California's zero-emission vehicles (ZEVs) regulation was first adopted in 1990 as part of the Low Emission Vehicle Program, and it has been modified several times over the years. The ZEV program is under the responsibility of the California Air Resources Board (CARB). The program goal is to reduce the pervasive air pollution affecting the main metropolitan areas in the state, particularly in Los Angeles, where prolonged pollution episodes are frequent. At the time, California's poor air quality was worse than the other 49 states combined.

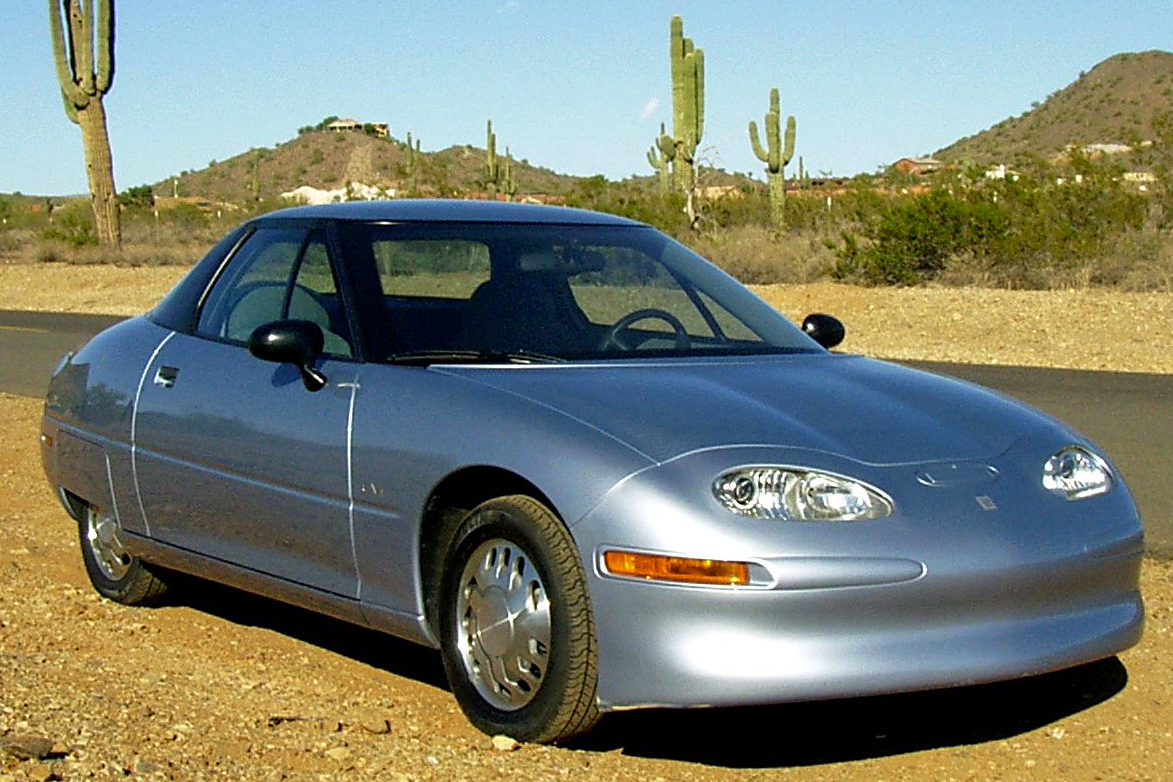
The General Motors EV1 was an electric car produced and leased by General Motors as a result of CARB's 1990 Low-Emission Vehicle (LEV I) Program.

The first ruling was the 1990 Low-Emission Vehicle (LEV I) Program. CARB ruled that each of the U.S.'s seven largest carmakers— the largest of which was General Motors —would be required to make 2% of its fleet emission-free by 1998, 5% by 2001, and 10% by 2003, in accordance with consumer demand, to continue to sell cars in California. Other members of what was then the American Automobile Manufacturers Association, along with Toyota, Nissan and Honda, each also developed an electric car in response to the new mandate: the General Motors EV1 (1996–2003), Toyota RAV4 EV (1997–2003), Honda EV Plus (1997–1999), Nissan Altra (1998–2001), Chrysler TEVan (1993–1995), Dodge Caravan EPIC (1999 to 2001), and Ford TH!NK City (1999–2003).

As the carmakers leasing electric cars believed that these vehicles occupied an unprofitable niche of the automobile market, an alliance of the major automakers litigated the CARB regulation in court, resulting in a slackening of the ZEV stipulation, permitting the companies to produce super-low-emissions vehicles, natural gas vehicles, and hybrid cars in place of pure electrics. Production was subsequently discontinued in 2002, and, with the exception of Toyota, all of the cars on the road were repossessed. Lessees were not given the option to purchase their cars.

The ZEV regulation has evolved and been modified several times since 1990, and several new partial or low-emission categories were created. The Low-Emission Vehicle Program was revised in 2008 to define modified ZEV regulations for 2015 models. The ZEV program resulted in 15% of ZEV sales in 2022.

=== Government goals ===
In January 2018, Governor Brown set a new goal of getting a total of 5 million zero-emission vehicles in California by 2030. As of September 2017, there were 337,483 zero-emission vehicles sold in California.

In August 2022, California passed a provision that would prohibit the sale of new gasoline-powered cars by 2035.

=== Government incentives ===
California has been a leader in the adoption of plug-in electric vehicles as the state has in place several financial and non-financial incentives. In addition to the existing federal tax credit, plug-in cars are eligible for a purchase rebate of up to US$2,500 through the Clean Vehicle Rebate Project (CVRP).

==== HOV access ====
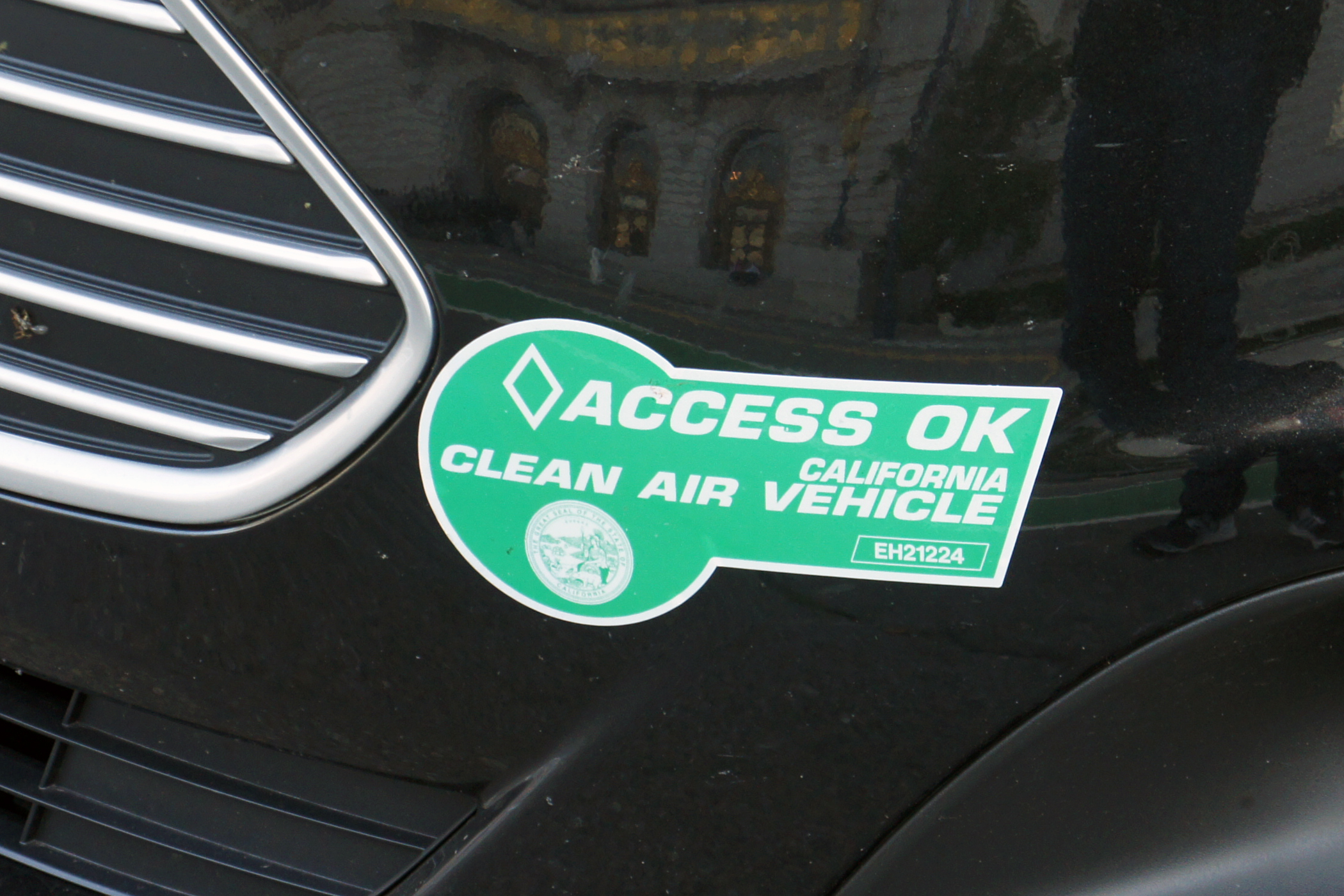
California's green Clean Air Vehicle sticker for plug-in hybrids (expired 1/1/2019)

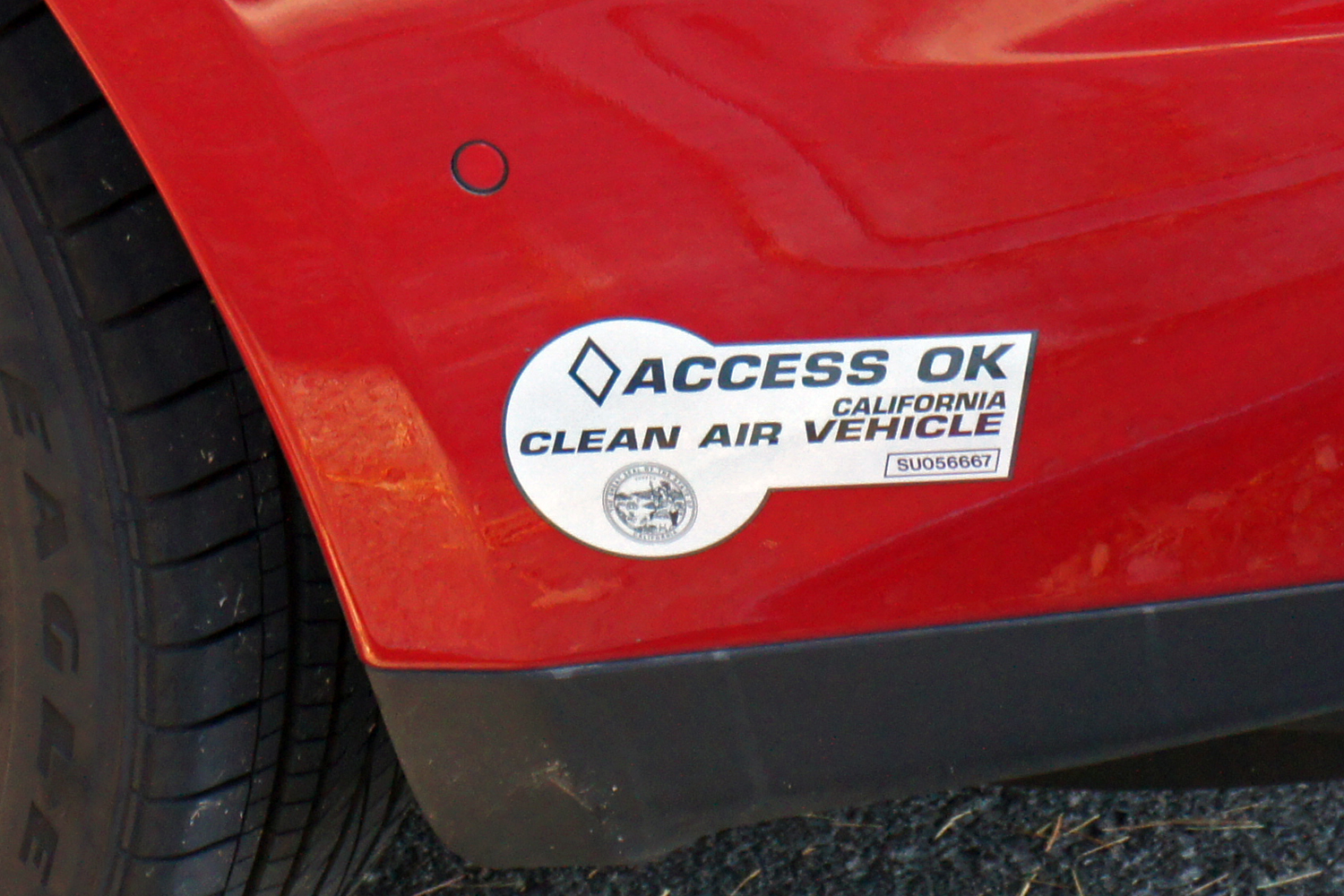
California's white Clean Air Vehicle sticker for all-electric cars (expired 1/1/2019)

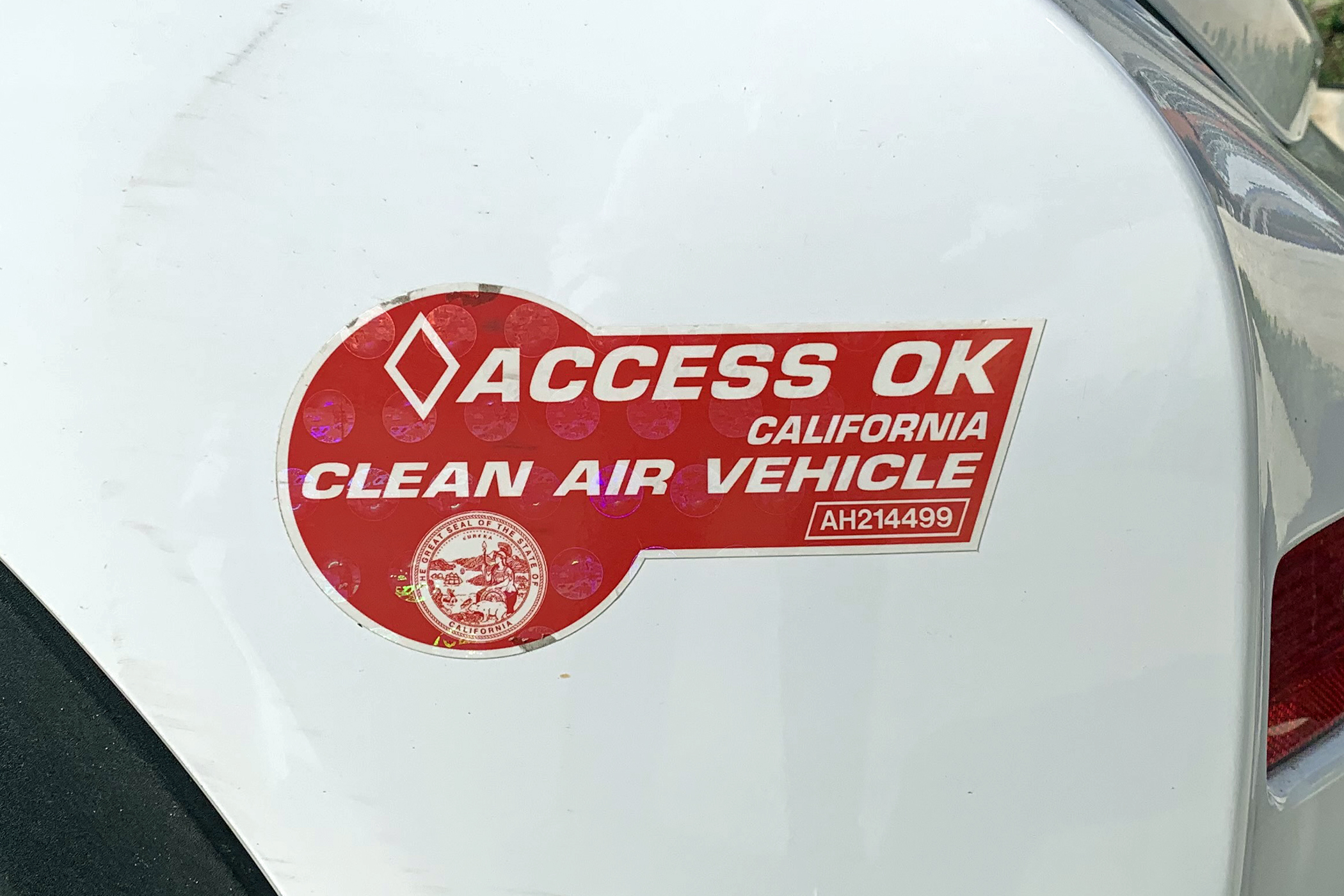
California's red Clean Air Vehicle sticker for all-electric cars (expired 1/1/2022)

In 2000, California began issuing Clean Air Vehicle (CAV) decals to vehicles that met specified emissions standards, allowing them to be operated by a single occupant in California's high-occupancy vehicle lanes (HOV), or carpool or diamond lanes. Battery electric vehicles and initially, the first 40,000 applicants that purchased or leased a plug-in hybrid meeting California's Enhanced Advanced Technology Partial Zero Emission Vehicle (Enhanced AT PZEV) or Transitional Zero-Emission Vehicle (TZEV) requirements, were entitled to the CAV stickers. The white access sticker was reserved for zero-emissions vehicles, while plug-in hybrids used the green sticker.

Initially, the green and white clean air sticker were set to expire on January 1, 2015, but in 2013 the expiration date for both stickers was extended to January 1, 2019. All-electric vehicles classified as Federal Inherently Low Emission Vehicles (ILEVs), and as zero emissions vehicles were entitled to an unlimited number of white CAV stickers. The number of green stickers available had been increased several times. In September 2016, the limit imposed to the Green Clean Air Vehicle Decal was removed.

The number of green clean air stickers issued grew from about 10,900 in March 2013 to 28,739 by the end of 2013. As a result, by mid March 2014 the California Department of Motor Vehicles (DMV) suspended the program allowing new car dealers to purchase and install green CAV stickers on eligible vehicles before they are sold. The DMV decided to reserve all remaining green stickers from the original 40,000 limit for individual consumer applications. As of 9 May 2014, the initial 40,000 green stickers were issued.

The San Francisco Bay Area Metropolitan Transportation Commission opposed the 2014 bill to expand the green stickers on the grounds that they "are concerned about further erosion of HOV lane capacity to vehicles that are neither reducing the number of trips on the road nor paying a toll. With congestion levels shooting up again, especially in the prosperous South Bay of the region where the purchase of such vehicles is more likely, we do not believe it is appropriate to give access to the region’s HOV lanes or express lanes away for free."

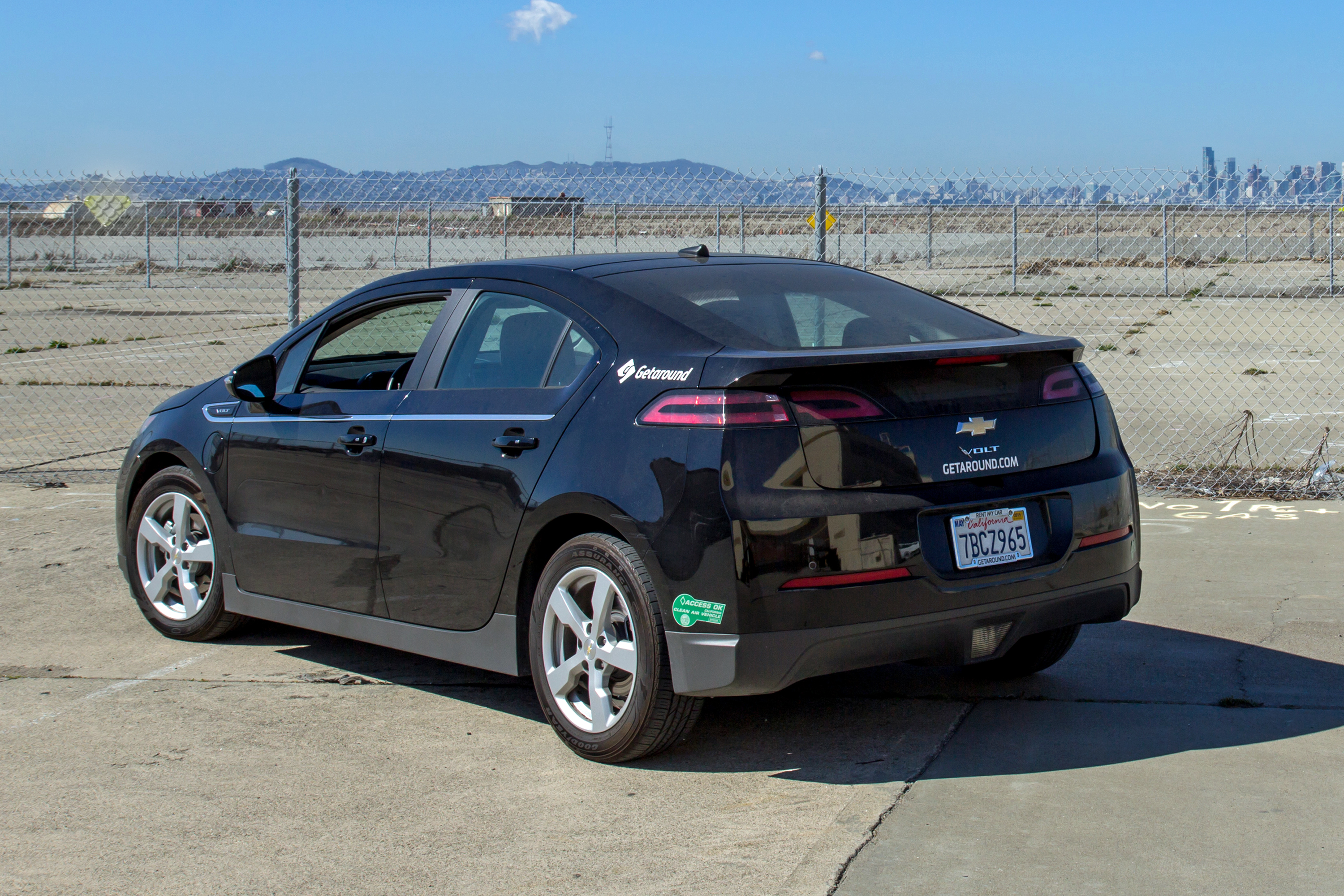
Chevrolet Volt with California's HOV lane access green sticker

The green sticker limit was increased by 15,000 beginning July 1, 2014, through the budget trailer bill SB 853. In September 2014 Governor Jerry Brown signed the bill AB 2013 that raised the cap for the green stickers from 55,000 to 70,000 new plug-in hybrids. By June 2015, a total of 68,343 green stickers had been issued by the California Department of Motor Vehicles (DMV). In June 2015, the bill AB 95 was approved by the State Legislature raising the upper limit from 70,000 to 85,000 green stickers. By December 2015, the 85,000 limited was reached. The DMV continued to accept applications without payment to establish a queue for requesters should an additional amount of green decals be authorized. In September 2016, the budget trailer bill SB-838, effective from September 13, 2016, removed the limit imposed to the Green Clean Air Vehicle Decal.

Research performed by the UCLA Luskin Center for Innovation in 2015 found that access to HOV lanes has a significant impact on plug-in car sales. Researchers linked automobile sales to a sample of more than 7,000 of the 8,057 census tracts in California for the study, including Los Angeles, Sacramento, San Diego and San Francisco. They looked at the number of plug-in car sales and the miles of carpool lanes within a 30 mi (48 km) radius of each census tract. The study concluded that the ability to use potentially time-saving HOV lanes prompted the purchase of more than 24,000 plug-in electric cars and hybrids in the four urban areas from 2010 to 2013, or about 40% of the total of such vehicles. The UCLA researcher concluded that without the policy giving plug-in vehicles access to HOV lanes, total plug-in sales in the same study areas would have been only 36,692 for the three-year period.

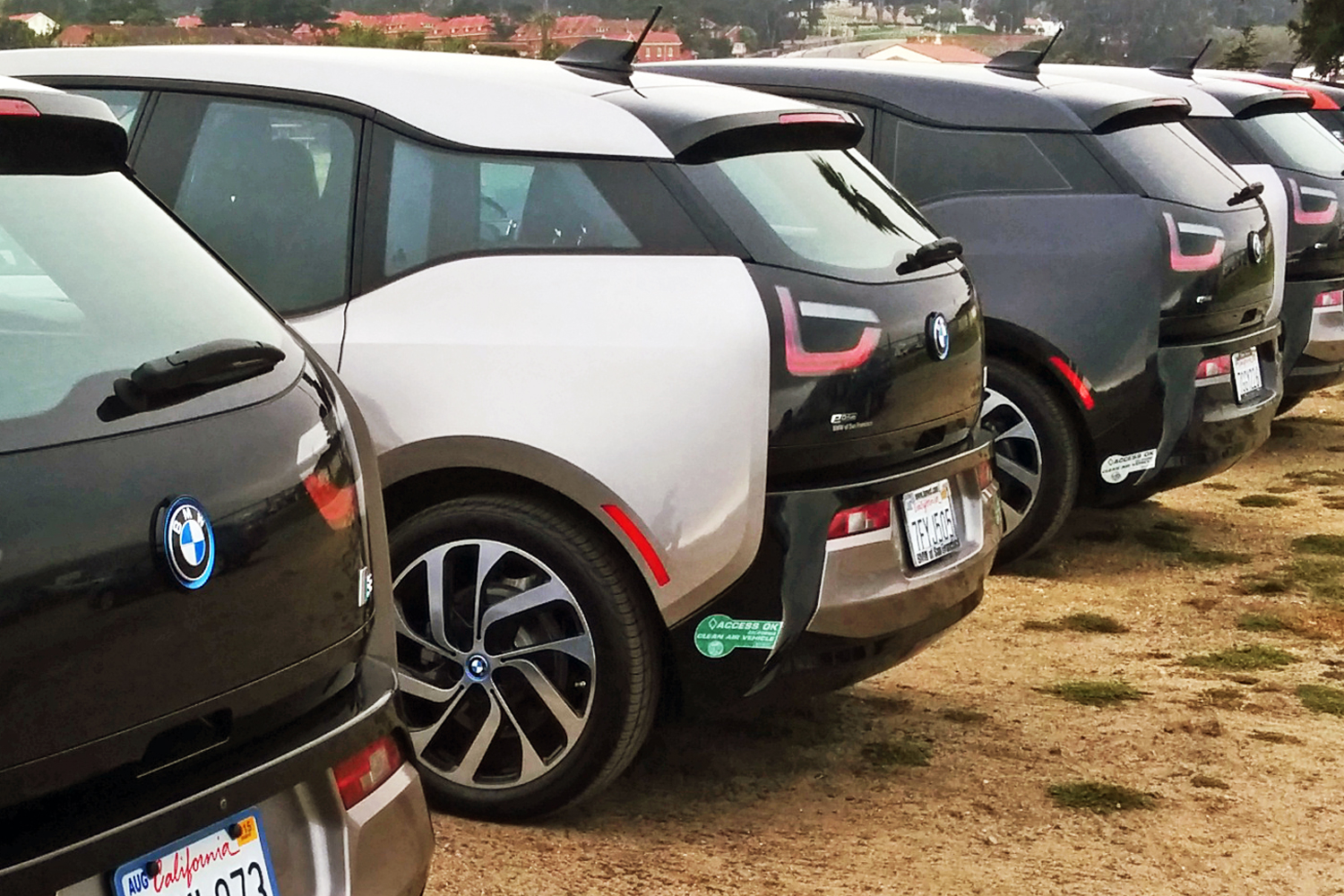
Several BMW i3s with California's HOV lane access stickers. The i3 with range-extender has the green sticker while the pure electric i3 displays the white sticker.

As part of a package of bills signed into law by Governor Brown in September 2014, through SB 1275 the California Air Resources Board was mandated to draft a financial plan to meet California's goal of 1 million vehicles on the road while making sure that disadvantaged communities can participate. For this purpose CARB had to change the Clean Vehicle Rebate program to provide an extra credit for low-income residents who wish to purchase or lease an electric car. CARB also should provide assistance to carsharing programs in low-income neighborhoods and install charging stations in apartment buildings in those communities. Under SB 1275, low-income residents who agree to scrap older, polluting cars will also get a clean vehicle rebate on top of existing payments for junking smog-producing vehicles.

Another bill signed into law in September 2014, AB1721, granted clean air vehicles free or reduced rates in high-occupancy toll lanes (HOT) lanes. Drivers of clean vehicles were already enjoying discounted rates in some facilities, such the toll to cross the San Francisco Bay Area bridges and to use the State Route 91 Express Lanes in Orange and Riverside Counties.

The CAV decal program was contingent on federal law, first enacted by the 1998 Transportation Equity Act for the 21st Century and last amended by the 2015 Fixing America's Surface Transportation Act, that allowed such a program on the HOV lanes of federal and state highways. When the US Congress did not change part of the law that had an end date, September 30, 2025, California stopped the CAV decal program as well.

==== Clean Vehicle Rebate Project ====
In addition to the federal tax credit of up to US$7,500 depending on battery size, California established the Clean Vehicle Rebate Project (CVRP) in order to promote the production and use of zero-emission vehicles (ZEVs), including plug-in electric and fuel cell vehicles. The program was created from Assembly Bill 118 that was signed by Governor Schwarzenegger in October 2007. The funding is provided on a first-come, first-served basis, and the project is expected to go through 2015.

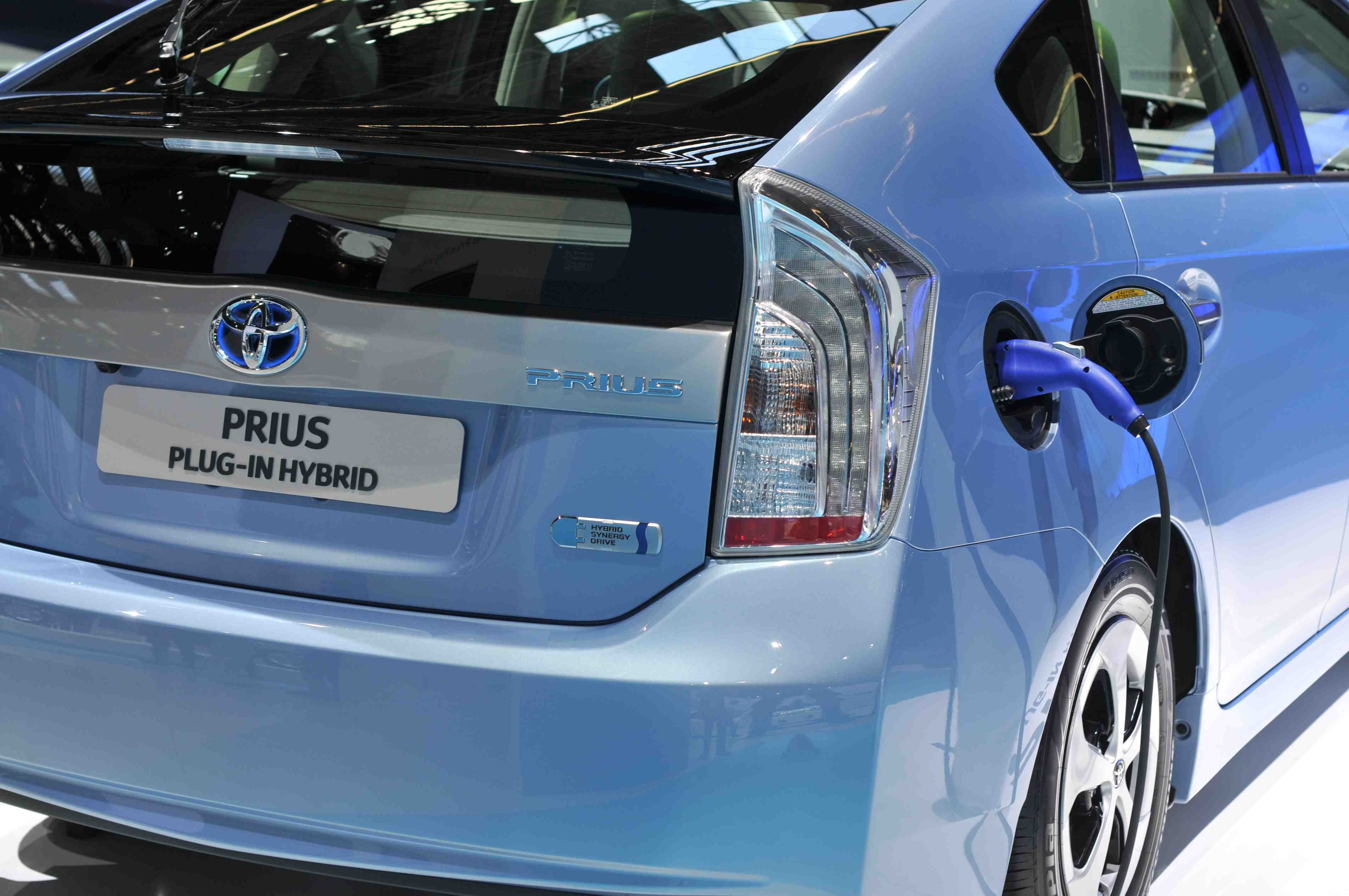
Besides a US$2,500 federal tax credit, the Toyota Prius Plug-in Hybrid is eligible for an additional US$1,500 rebate in California.

Eligible vehicles include only new California Air Resources Board-certified or approved zero-emission or plug-in hybrid electric vehicles. A list of eligible vehicles can be found on the California Center for Sustainable Energy web site. Among the eligible vehicles are neighborhood electric vehicles, battery electric, plug-in hybrid electric, and fuel cell vehicles including cars, trucks, medium- and heavy-duty commercial vehicles, and zero-emission motorcycles. Vehicles must be purchased or leased on or after March 15, 2010. Initially, the CVRP offered rebates of up to US$5,000 per light-duty vehicle, available for individuals and business owners who purchase or lease new eligible vehicles. Once the initial funding was exhausted, the program offered a lower rebate of up to US$2,500.

As of March 2014, the following six plug-in hybrids are eligible for a US$1,500 rebate in California: Cadillac ELR, Chevrolet Volt, Ford C-Max Energi, Ford Fusion Energi, Honda Accord Plug-in Hybrid, and Toyota Prius Plug-in Hybrid. Only 2012 Volts manufactured after February 6, 2012, and later model year, are fitted with the low emission package that qualifies the plug-in hybrid as qualify as a California AT-PZEV.

As of early March 2013, the California Air Resources Board (CARB) reported that 9,559 all-electric vehicle and 8,842 plug-in hybrid owners had applied for the state's Clean Vehicle Rebate since January 2011. However, about 2,300 Chevrolet Volts were sold in California before the Volt became eligible for the rebate in February 2012, and therefore, are not accounted in the CVRP database. According to these figures plug-in hybrid electric vehicles were outselling pure electric vehicles in California by early 2013.

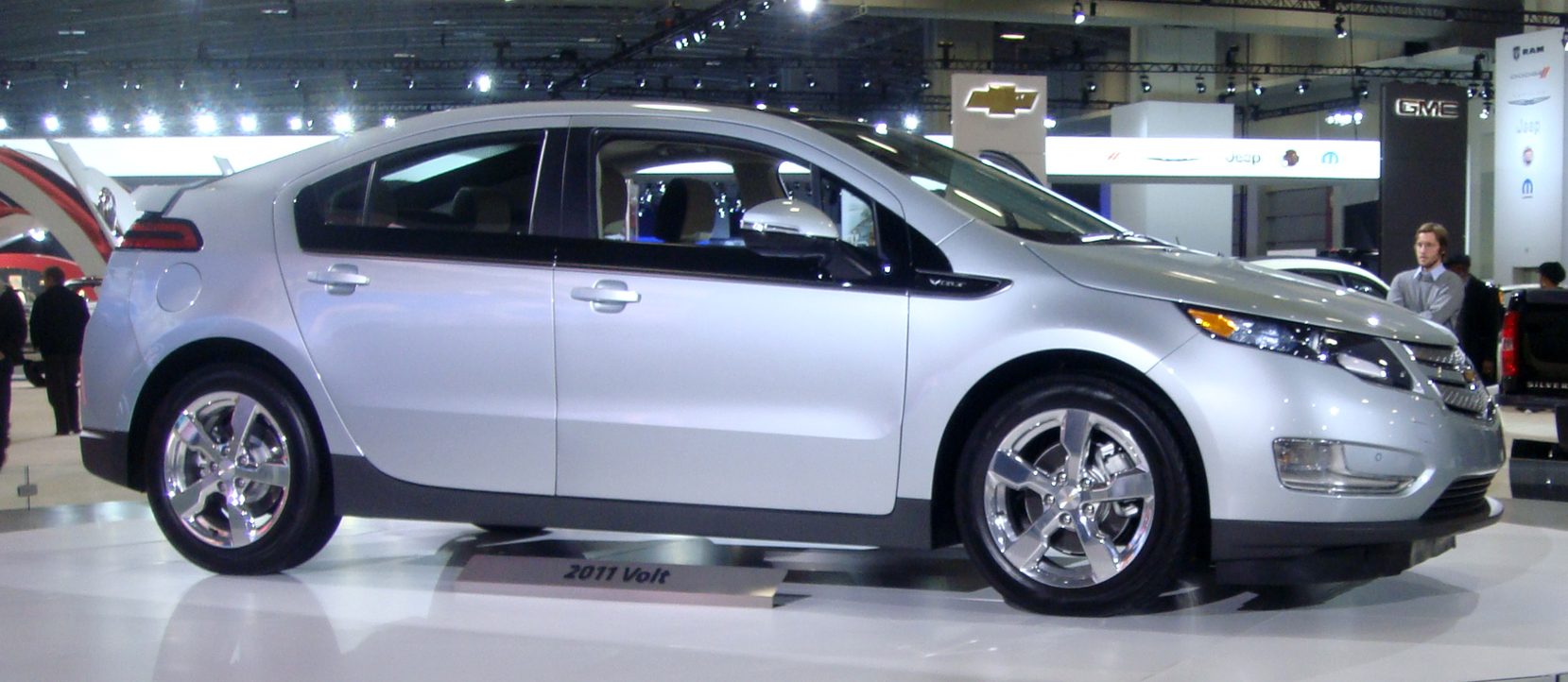
In addition to a US$7,500 federal tax credit, the 2012 and later model year Chevrolet Volts qualified in California for the US$1,500 CVRP rebate and had free access to high-occupancy vehicle lanes.

As of 10 March 2014, a total of 52,264 clean vehicle rebates had been issued, for a total of US$110,222,866 disbursed, with only US$3.8 million remaining for fiscal year 2013–2014. The distribution of the rebates issued correspond to 27,210 zero-emission vehicles (ZEVs), including both battery electric vehicles (BEVs) and fuel cell vehicles (FCVs); 24,657 plug-in hybrids (PHEVs); 49 commercial zero-emission vehicles (CZEVs); 210 zero-emission motorcycles (ZEMs); and 138 neighborhood electric vehicles (NEVs). Not all plug-in electric vehicles sold in California are captured in the CVRP database because not every PEV owner applies for the rebate. As of 8 June 2015, and without accounting for the 2,300 Volts sold before February 2012, plug-in hybrids represented 42.5% of the 107,855 clean vehicle rebates issued, while BEVs represented 56.9% of all rebates, and fuel cell vehicles represented 0.1% of the rebates issued. In terms of funding, plug-in hybrids have captured 30.1% of the total US$227,972,074 funded by early June 2015.

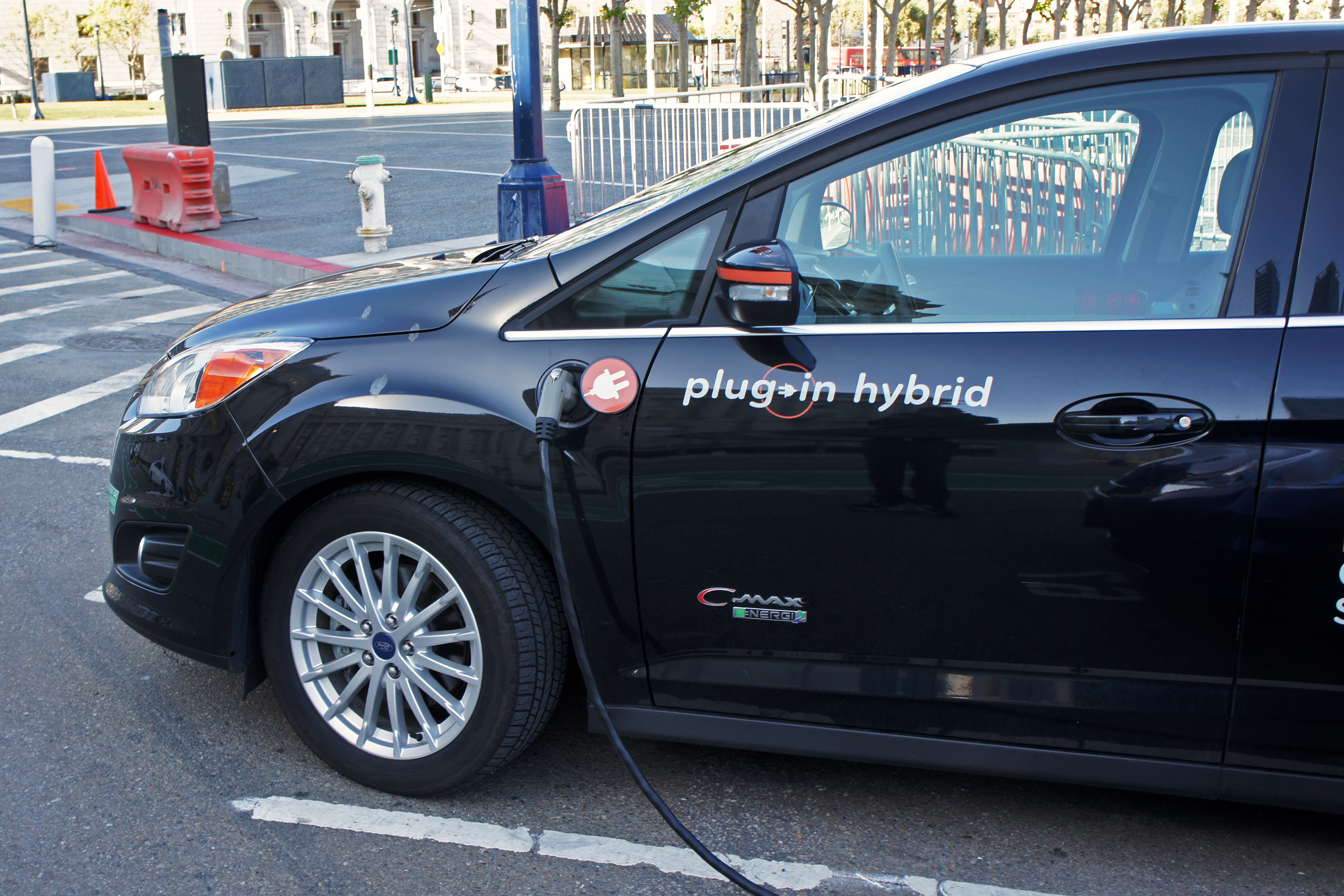
The Ford C-Max Energi qualifies for a federal tax credit of up to US$3,750, and an additional US$1,500 CVRP rebate in California.

As of April 2014, the CVRP was facing an estimated US$30 million funding shortfall for the 2013-14 fiscal year, and uncertainty about increases for the 2014-15 fiscal year. CARB staff presented a proposal to the board to overcome the funding shortage and also to facilitate the rebates to benefit buyers in disadvantaged communities who live in areas with bad air quality or who can't afford high-end electric cars. The options being considered were to reduce the rebate by US$500 and to set a US$60,000 cap to the manufacturer's suggested retail price of the vehicles, which would exclude the Cadillac ELR and the Tesla Model S from benefiting from the rebate. A bill signed into law in September 2014, mandated the California Air Resources Board to draft a financial plan to meet California's goal of putting 1 million vehicles on the road while making sure that disadvantaged communities can participate. For this purpose CARB has to change the Clean Vehicle Rebate program to provide an extra credit for low-income drivers who wish to purchase or lease an electric car. CARB also should provide assistance to carsharing programs in low-income neighborhoods and install charging stations in apartment buildings in those communities. Under bill SB 1275, low-income residents who agree to scrap older, polluting cars will also get a clean vehicle rebate on top of existing payments for junking smog-producing vehicles.

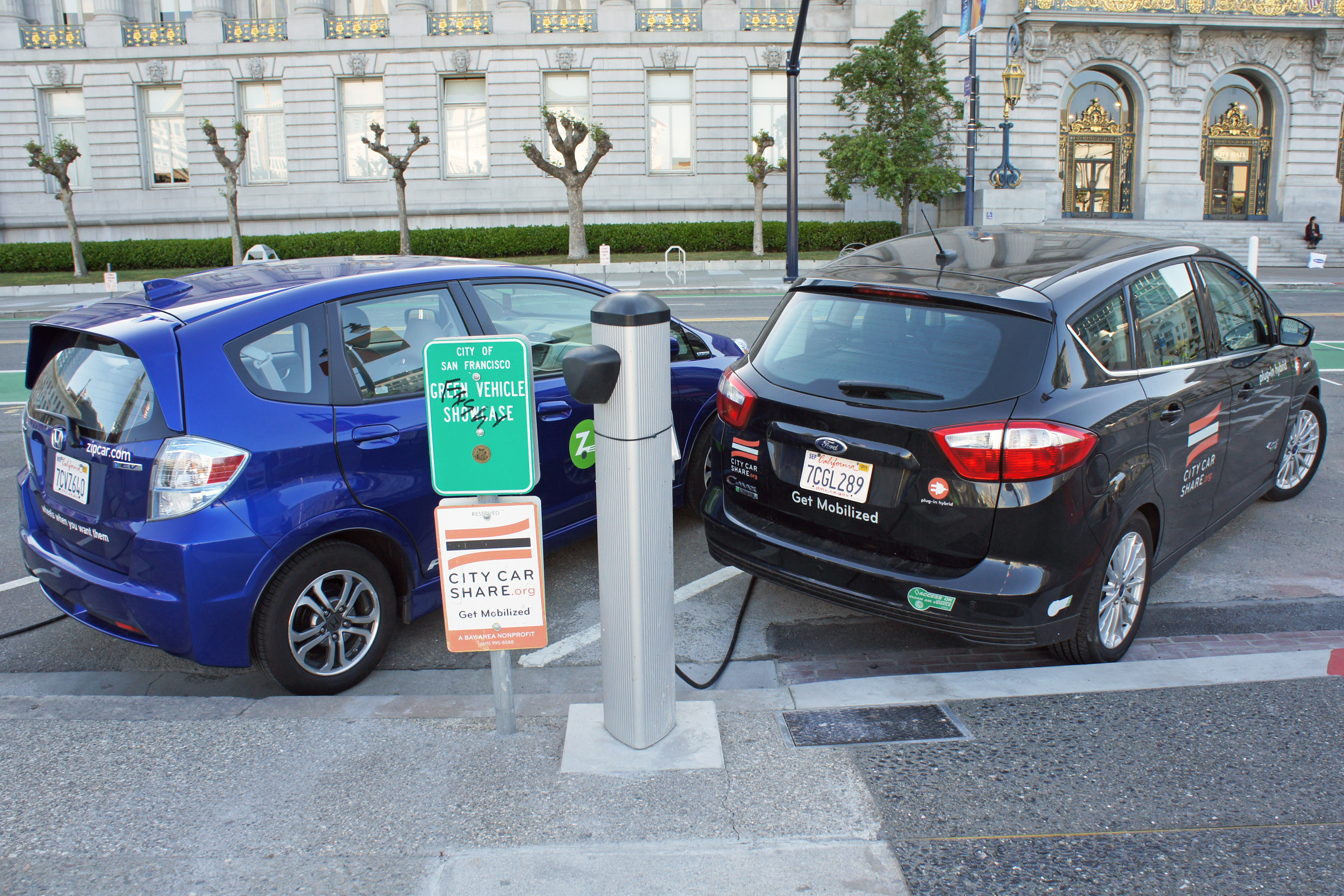
Plug-in electric cars charging at the public charging station in front of San Francisco City Hall

The Clean Vehicle Rebate Project (CVRP) notes their figures do not capture all plug-in electric vehicles sold in California because not every PEV owner applies for the rebate. Also, about 2,300 Chevrolet Volts were sold in California before the Volt became eligible for the rebate in February 2012, and therefore, these sales are not accounted in the CVRP database. In terms of market share, plug-in hybrids represented 47.2% of all clean vehicle rebates, while ZEVs, predominantly all-electric cars, represented 52.11% of all rebates issued since January 2011 through early March 2014. Accounting for sales of the 2,300 Volts, the distribution becomes 49.9% for ZEVs and 49.4% for PHEVs. According to the Center for Sustainable Energy, the following are the top five brands receiving the rebates between 2010 and 2015: Chevrolet (21%), Nissan (20%), Tesla Motors (15%), Toyota (14%), and Ford Motor Company (12%).

The following table presents the geographical distribution of the rebates by county and by type of vehicle (ZEV or PHEV) for the top 15 counties, which together represent 93% of all rebates issued by early March 2014. Based on the CVRP database, Southern California is the leading region in plug-in electric vehicle adoption, with over 28,500 rebates issued for PEVs, while the San Francisco Bay Area has benefited with more than 18,300 rebates. Southern California has captured 54.7% of all rebated issued. The top five counties in the state by early March 2014 are Los Angeles (14,420), Santa Clara (7,735), Orange (6,182), San Diego (4,659), and Alameda (3,870). In Southern California plug-in hybrids (15,201) are outselling all-electric cars (13,200), while in the Bay Area electric cars (10,992) are outselling plug-in hybrids (7,249).

California Clean Vehicle Rebate Project (CVRP) beneficiaries by county with over 500 rebates issued as of 10 March 2014
County	Total rebates^{(1)}	ZEVs (BEV/FCV)	PHEVs^{(2)}	Rebate funding	% State
Top counties Southern California
Los Angeles	14,420	6,277	8,015	$29,117,973	27.6%
Orange	6,182	2,537	3,622	$12,109,099	11.8%
San Diego	4,659	3,060	1,563	$10,827,189	8.9%
Riverside	1,308	501	804	$2,512,933	2.5%
Ventura	1,083	488	593	$2,214,494	2.1%
San Bernardino	943	337	604	$1,780,950	1.8%
Top counties SoCal	28,595	13,200	15,201	$58,562,638	54.7%
Top counties San Francisco Bay Area
Santa Clara	7,735	4,630	3,080	$16,957,252	14.8%
Alameda	3,870	2,291	1,552	$8,354,469	7.4%
San Mateo	2,123	1,419	657	$4,865,466	4.1%
Contra Costa	1,951	985	959	$4,027,554	3.7%
San Francisco	1,082	681	371	$2,557,025	2.1%
Marin	845	536	305	$1,907,300	1.6%
Sonoma	781	450	325	$1,695,800	1.5%
Top counties Bay Area	18,387	10,992	7,249	$40,364,866	35.2%
Other top counties
Sacramento	1,062	634	427	$2,272,609	2.0%
Santa Cruz	542	330	204	$1,193,900	1.0%
Total Top 15 counties	48,586	25,156	23,081	$102,394,013	93.0%
Total California^{(3)}	52,264	27,210	24,657	$110,222,866	100%
Notes: (1) Total includes ZEVs (both BEVs and FCVs), PHEVs, CZEVs, ZEMs and NEVs. (2) About 2,300 Chevrolet Volts sold in California before the car became eligible for the rebate in February 2012 are not included. (3) Not all plug-in electric vehicles sold in California are captured in the CVRP database as not every PEV owner applies for the rebate.

In July 2015 California began analyzing to add income-based caps to its plug-in car rebate system. From data gathered through June 2015, it appears higher-income buyers are getting the majority of California rebates. A survey from the second quarter of 2015 showed that about three quarters of rebates went to households earning more than US$99,000 a year. Those with incomes above US$200,000 a year accounted for 26% of total rebates, while those with income under US$99,000 represented 27%. This policy change is expected to primarily affect Tesla Motors, whose lineup starts at US$75,000.

In March 2016 California added income-based caps to its rebate system. Buyers with incomes less than 300% of the Federal poverty level will get up to US$3,000 for a plug-in hybrid, US$4,000 for an all-electric car, and US$6,500 for a hydrogen fuel-cell car and the rebate scales down until Californian buyers with incomes over US$250,000 are no longer are eligible for incentives on hybrids or electric cars, however can get US$5,000 for a hydrogen fuel-cell car. As of March 2016, the Center for Sustainable Energy has issued more than $291 million in the CVRP for over 137,200 vehicles since 2010. The income-base caps went into effect on 1 November 2016. Residents will not be eligible for rebates if their gross annual income exceeds US$150,000 for single tax filers, US$204,000 for head of household filers and US$300,000 for joint filers. These limits do not apply to the purchase of fuel cell electric vehicles, which represent less than 1% of rebate applications.

== Charging infrastructure ==
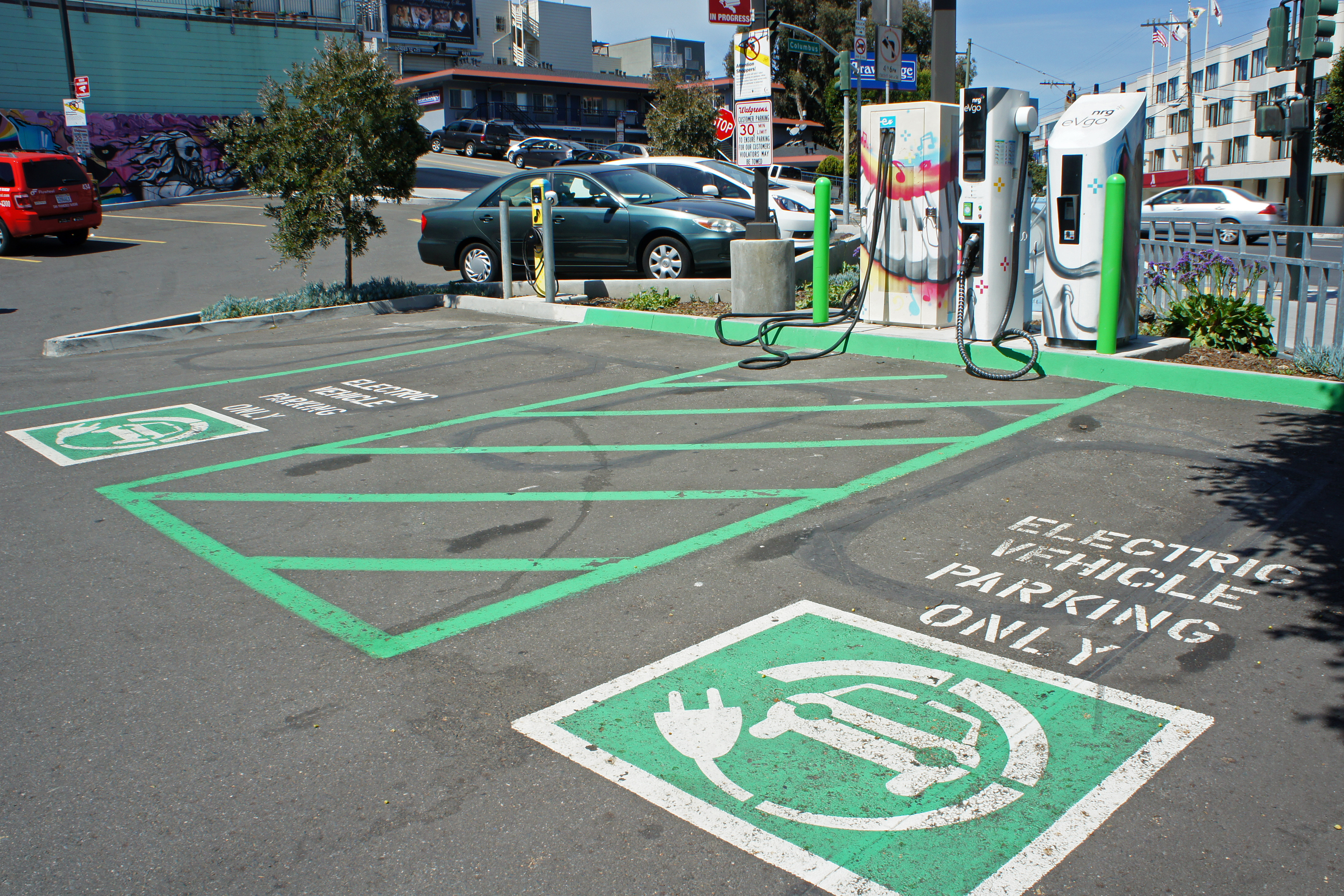
Public charging stations in a parking lot in San Francisco

As of December 2022, there were 80,027 public charging stations in California.

The Infrastructure Investment and Jobs Act, signed into law in November 2021, allocates US$384 million to charging stations in California.

AB 2565 facilitates access to charging stations by requiring commercial and residential property owners to approve installation if the charging station meets requirements and complies with the owner's process for approving a modification to the property. The law makes a term in a lease of a commercial property, executed, renewed, or extended on or after 1 January 2015, void and unenforceable if it prohibits or unreasonably restricts the installation of an electric vehicle charging station in a parking space.

== Market outlook ==
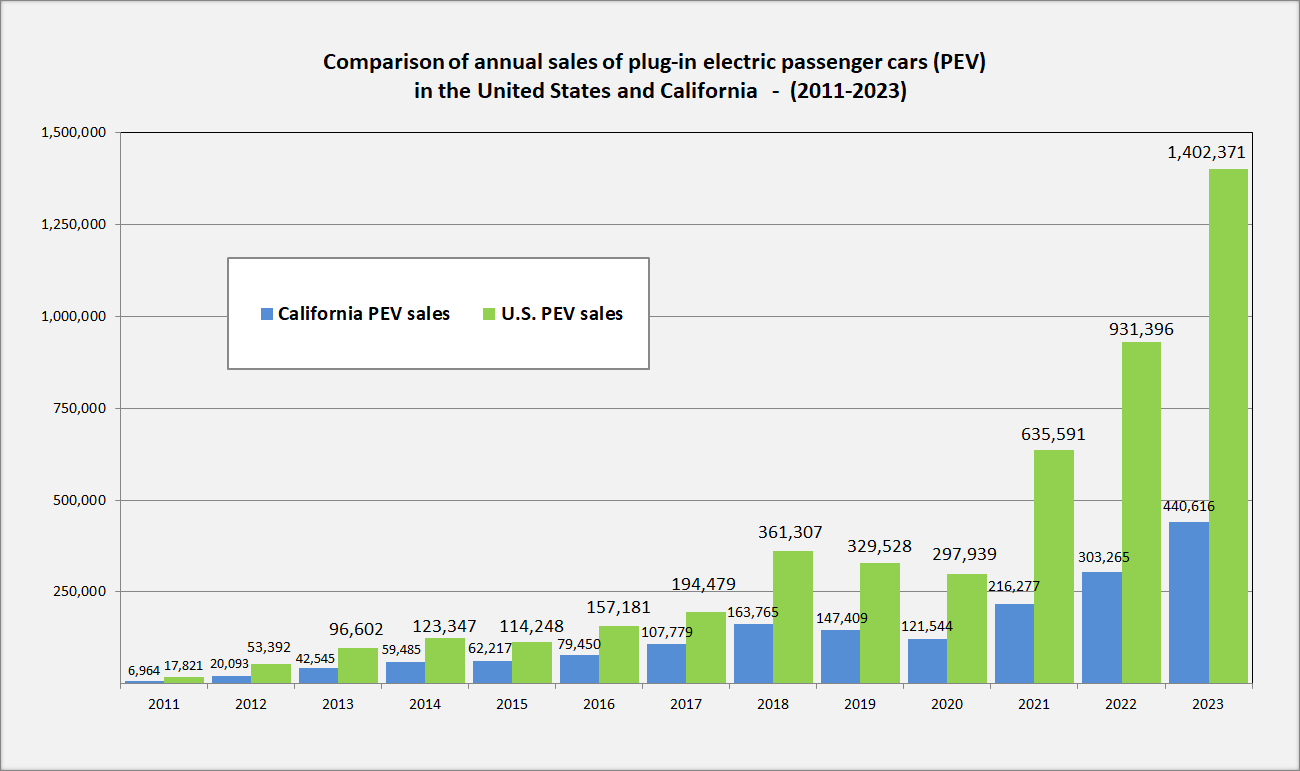
Comparison of annual sales of plug-in electric vehicles in the United States versus California between 2011 and 2023

=== Sales and market share ===
As of December 2023, cumulative registrations of plug-in electric passenger cars totaled 1,771,806 units, making California the leading plug-in market in the U.S. While the state represents about 10% of nationwide new car sales, California has accounted for almost half of cumulative plug-in sales in the American market between 2014 and 2016, and by 2023 represented 31%.

Until December 2014 California not only had more plug-in electric vehicles than any other American state but also more than any other country in the world. In 2015 only two countries, Norway (22.4%) and the Netherlands (9.7%), achieved a higher plug-in market share than California. Cumulative sales of plug-in electric cars in the state since 2010 passed the 250,000 unit milestone by November 2016, and by then, China was the only country market that exceeded California in cumulative plug-in electric car sales. Cumulative plug-in car registrations achieved the 500,000 unit milestone by the end of November 2018, and 1 million by November 2021.

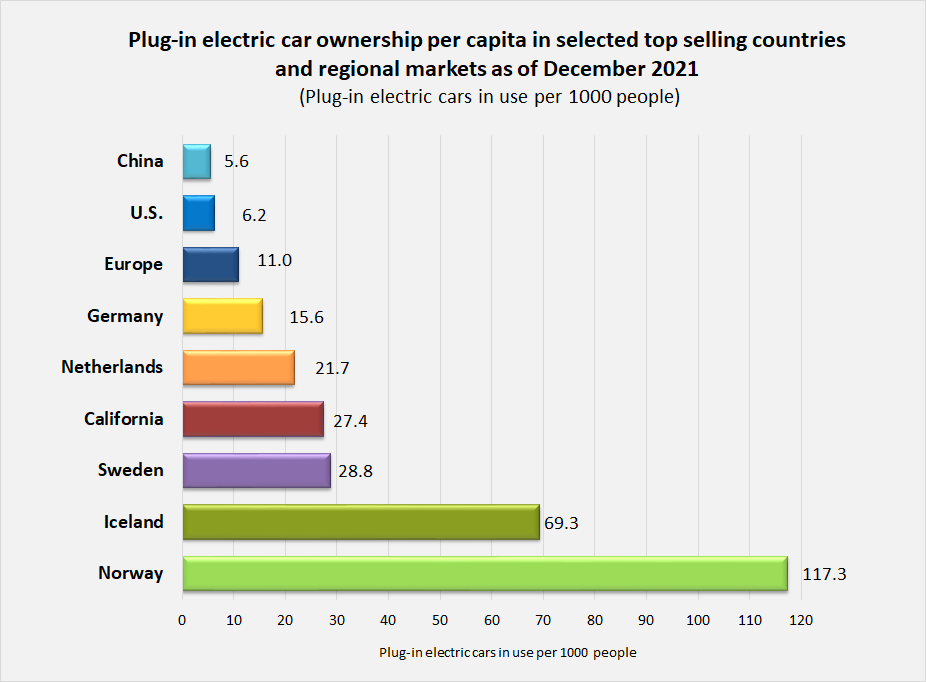
Comparison of ownership of plug-in electric cars in use per 1,000 people among top selling plug-in car countries and California, as of December 2021

Annual registrations of plug-in electric vehicles in California increased from 6,964 units in 2011 to 20,093 in 2012, and reached 42,545 units in 2013. In 2014, California's plug-in car market share reached 3.2% of total new car sales in the state, up from 2.5% in 2013, while the national plug-in market share in 2014 was 0.71%. The state's plug-in market share fell to 3.1% in 2015, with the plug-in hybrid segment dropping from 1.6% in 2014 to 1.4%, while the all-electric segment increased to 1.7% from 1.6% in 2014. Still, California's market share was 4.7 times higher than the U.S. market (0.66%), and registrations of plug-in electric cars in the state in 2015 represented 54.5% of total plug-in car sales in the U.S. that year.

California's plug-in car market share rose to 3.5% of new car sales in 2016, while the U.S. take-rate was 0.90%. In 2017, California's plug-in market share reached 4.8%, while the national share was 1.13%. Also in 2017, the state's plug-in segment market share surpassed the take-rate of conventional hybrids (4.6%) for the first time.

The plug-in market share rose to 7.6% in 2018, again ahead of conventional hybrids (4.3%), with the all-electric segment reaching for the first time a higher share than conventional hybrids (4.6%). In addition, the combined market share of pure electrics and plug-in hybrids surpassed the maximum share ever achieved by conventional hybrids, 6.9% in 2013. The electrified segment attained a record 11.9% market share, passing the 10% mark for the first time. The combined take-rate of plug-in cars in California stayed at 7.6% in 2019, while the market share of conventional hybrids rose to 5.6% from 4.3% in 2018. While the share of all electric cars rose to 5.6%, the rate of plug-in hybrids fell to 2.5% from 3.0% in 2018.

As a result of the strong decline in global car sales brought by the COVID-19 pandemic, in 2020 the American market fell 14.4%, while California sales of new light-duty vehicles declined further, 21.7% from 2019. Plug-in car sales in California also declined, fully electric cars fell 4.8%, and plug-in hybrids had a steeper declined of 40.5%, resulting in a combined decline of 16.5% for the plug-in segment. However, the market share increased to 8.1%, still ahead of conventional hybrids (6.9%). Despite the continued global decline in car sales brought by the shortages related to the COVID-19 pandemic, and computer chips in particular, the Californian plug-in market share rose to 12.8% in 2021.

The following table presents annual registrations and market share of new car sales for all-electric and plug-in hybrids sold in California between 2010 and 2023.

Year	California						U.S.		CA share of U.S. PEV sales^{(3)}	Ratio CA/US market shares
Year	All-electric	BEV market share^{(1)}	Plug-in hybrid	PHEV market share^{(1)}	Total PEV California	PEV market share^{(1)}	Total PEV sales	PEV market share^{(2)}	CA share of U.S. PEV sales^{(3)}	Ratio CA/US market shares
2010	300	0.02%	97	0.006%	397	0.03%	345	N/A	100%	-
2011	5,302	0.4%	1,662	0.1%	6,964	0.5%	17,821	0.14%	39.1%	3.57
2012	5,990	0.4%	14,103	0.9%	20,093	1.3%	53,392	0.37%	37.6%	3.51
2013	21,912	1.3%	20,633	1.2%	42,545	2.5%	96,602	0.62%	44.0%	4.03
2014	29,536	1.6%	29,949	1.6%	59,485	3.2%	123,347	0.71%	48.2%	4.27
2015	34,477	1.7%	27,740	1.4%	62,217	3.1%	114,248	0.66%	54.5%	4.70
2016	41,932	1.9%	37,518	1.7%	79,450	3.6%	157,181	0.90%	50.5%	4.00
2017	59,388	2.7%	48,391	2.2%	107,779	4.9%	194,479	1.13%	55.4%	4.32
2018	99,121	4.6%	64,644	3.0%	163,765	7.6%	361,307	2.10%	45.3%	3.62
2019	99,049	5.2%	48,360	2.6%	147,409	7.8%	329,528	1.98%	44.7%	3.94
2020	92,393	5.8%	29,151	1.8%	121,544	7.6%	297,939	2.03%	40.8%	3.74
2021	161,863	9.1%	54,414	3.1%	216,277	12.2%	635,591	4.22%	34.0%	2.89
2022	260,687	16.4%	42,578	2.7%	303,265	19.1%	931,396	6.36%	32.6%	3.00
2023	380,891	21.4%	59,725	3.4%	440,616	24.8%	1,402,371	8.4%	31.4%	2.94
Total	1,292,841	N/A	478,965	N/A	1,771,806	N/A	4,715,547	N/A	37.6%	N/A
Notes: (1) Market share of total new car registrations in California. (2) U.S. market share of total nationwide sales. (3) California's market share of total nationwide registrations.

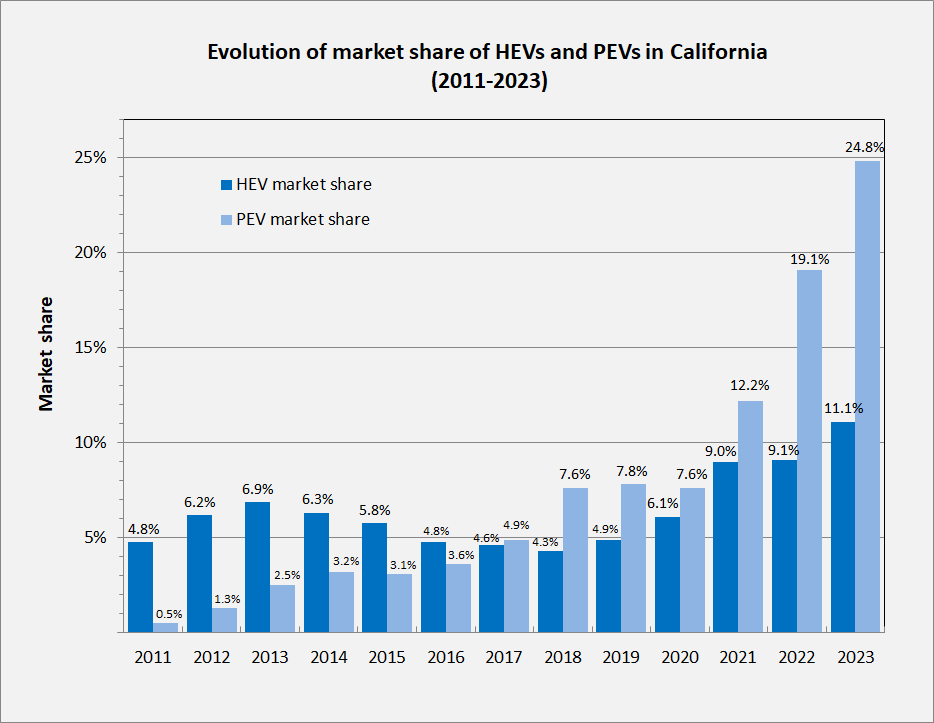
Evolution of the market share of hybrid electric vehicles and plug-in electric passenger cars in California (2011-2023)

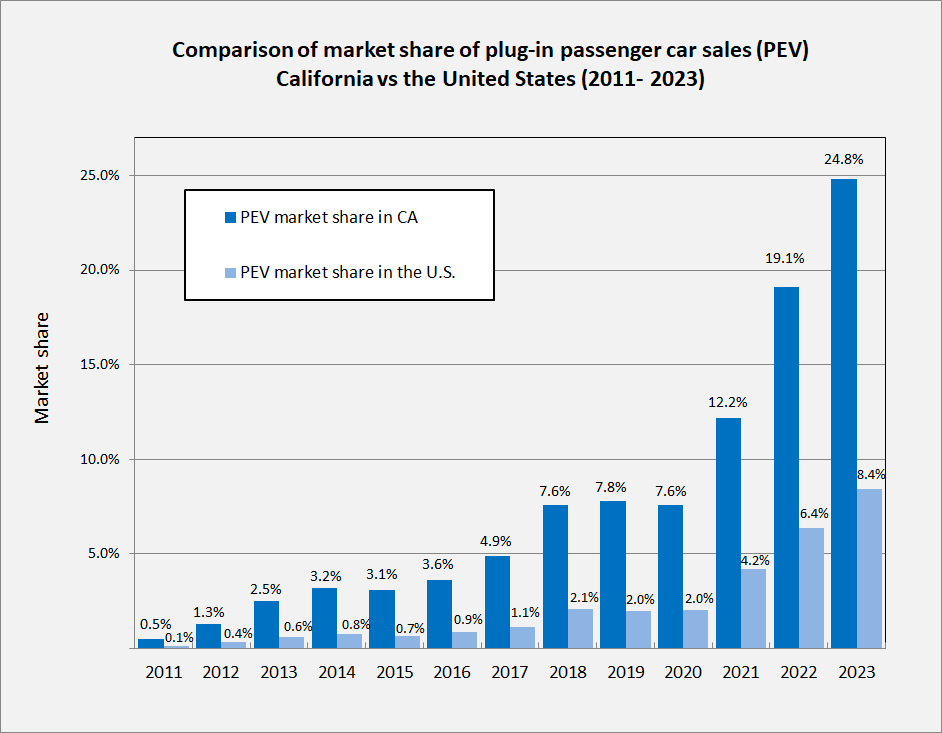
Comparison of plug-in electric car market shares of California vs United States (2011-2023)

==== Sales by model ====
California was the leading Volt market and accounted for almost 23% of Volt sales during the second quarter of 2012, followed by Michigan with 6.3% of national sales. The leading regional markets in California were San Francisco, Los Angeles, and San Diego, all metropolitan areas notorious for their high congestion levels and where free access to high-occupancy lanes for solo drivers has been a strong incentive to boost Volt sales in the state. As of November 2011 over 60% of the Leafs sold in the U.S. were bought in California. San Francisco-Oakland-San Jose, Los Angeles, San Diego and Sacramento were among the top selling markets for Leaf sales during the first eight months of 2013. Nissan noted that in San Francisco the Leaf is among the ten top selling vehicles regardless of powertrain.

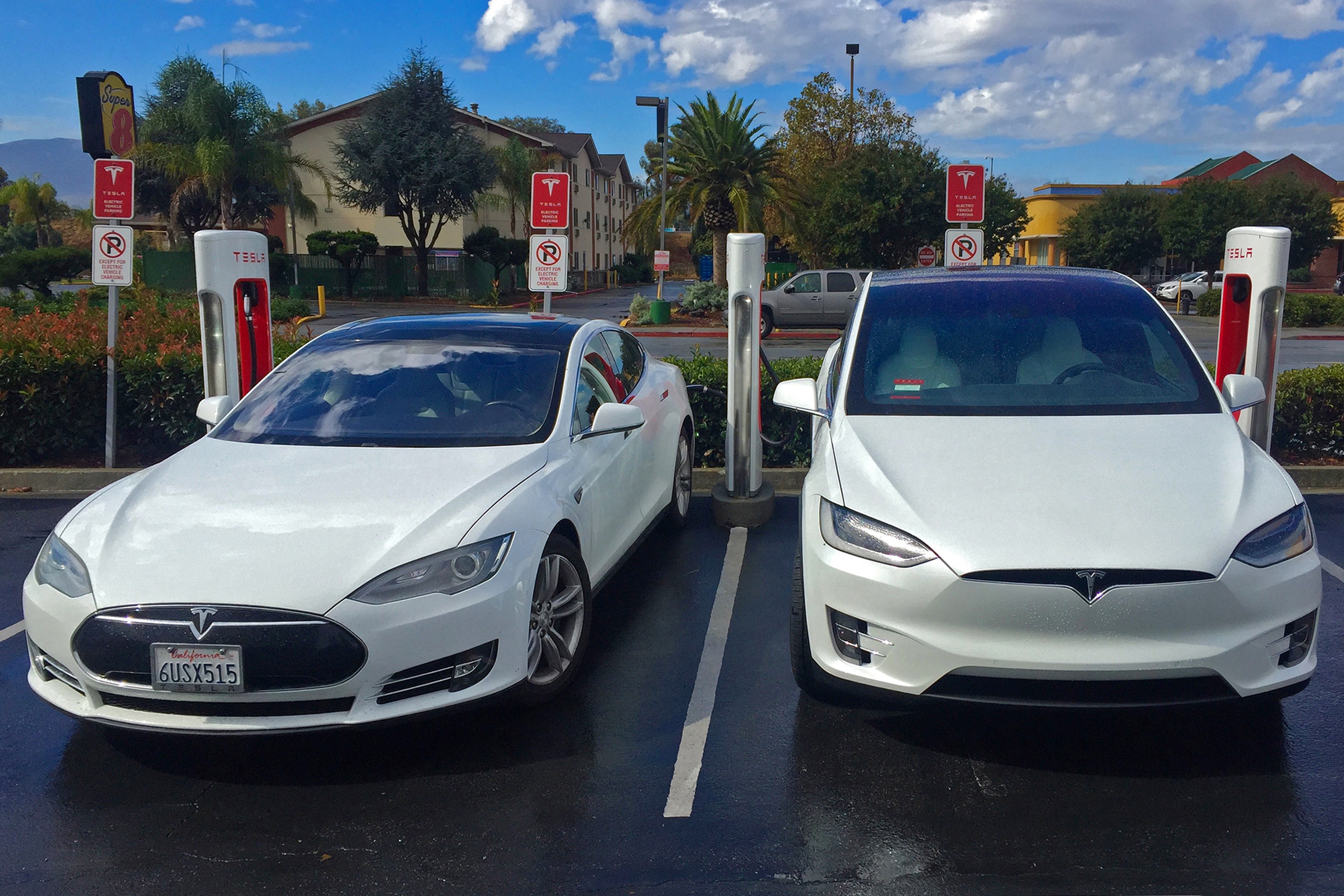
A Tesla Model S (left) and a Model X (right) charging at a Supercharger station in Gilroy, California

California is the largest American market for the Tesla Model S. In March 2013, Tesla Motors reported the delivery of the 3,000th Model S in California, representing around 50% of total Model S sales in the U.S. As of November 2013, with the Model S available nationwide, California continued to lead U.S. sales with a 48% share of national sales. The Model S, with 8,347 units sold, ended 2013 as the third best selling luxury car in California after the Mercedes-Benz E-Class and BMW 5 Series sedans, and captured a 9.8% market share of the Californian luxury and sports segment. According to Edmunds.com, between January and August 2013 the Model S achieved a high market share of new car sales among the U.S. most expensive ZIP codes, as rated by Forbes. Among the top 25 wealthiest ZIP codes, the highest Model S market shares are all found in California, with Atherton ranking first in the U.S. with a 15.4% share, followed by Los Altos Hills with 11.9%, and Portola Valley with 11.2%. Edmunds' analysis also found that during this period the Model S was the most registered passenger car in 8 of the 25 most expensive American ZIP codes.

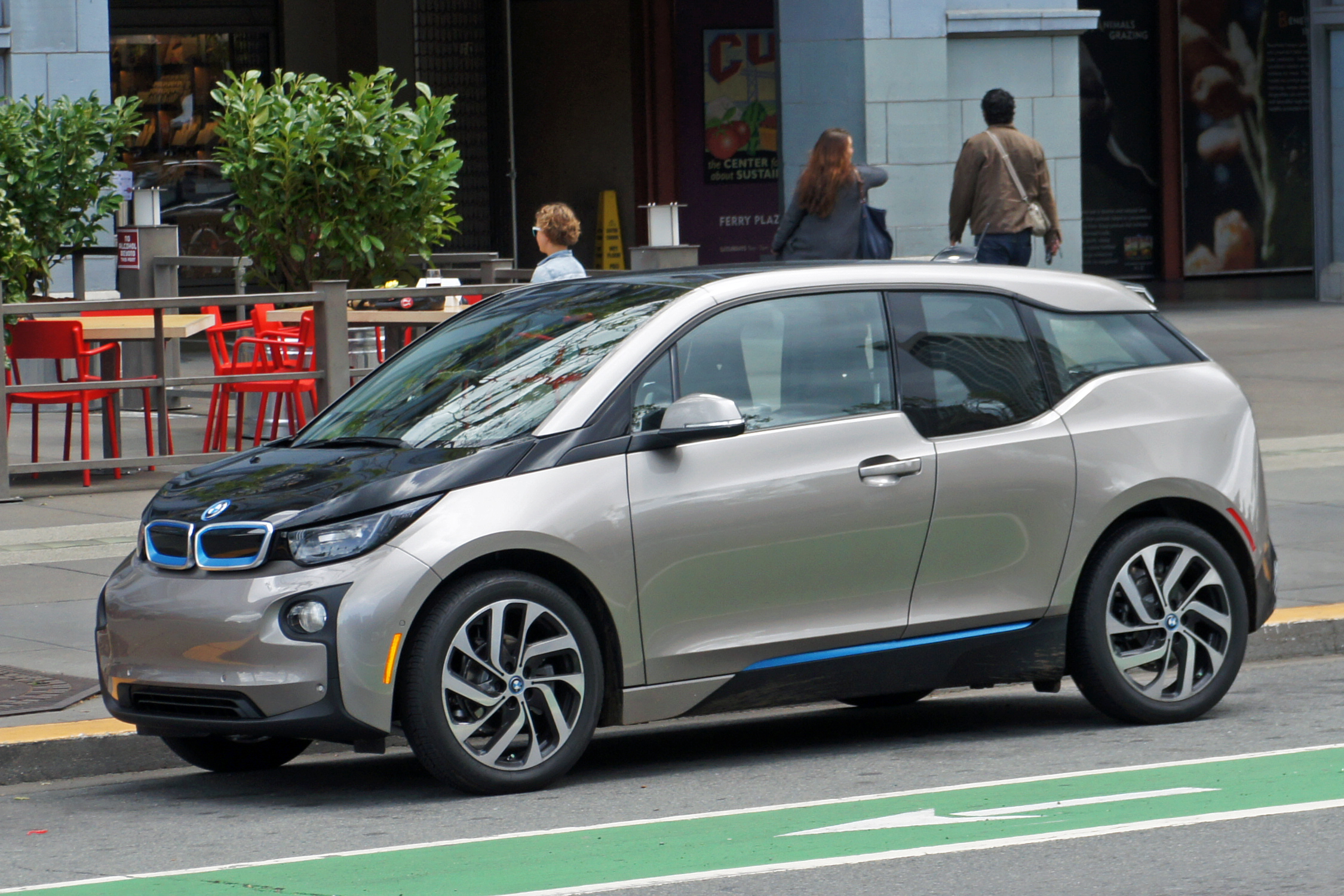
California is the leading American market for the BMW i3. Shown in Embarcadero, San Francisco.

California has also been the leading American market for the BMW i3, with about 3,000 units sold in the state in 2014, representing about half of total U.S. sales that year. Registrations of the Tesla Model S totaled 10,723 units in 2015, representing a 12.1% market share of the state's luxury and sports segment, making the Model S the third best selling car in the segment after the Mercedes-Benz E-Class (12,324) and BMW 5 Series (11,133).

The top selling models in 2017 were the Chevrolet Bolt (13,487), Tesla Model S (11,813), Tesla Model X (6,910), Fiat 500e (4,943), Nissan Leaf (4,418), and Volkswagen e-Golf (3,202). Tesla Inc. listed as the best selling plug-in manufacturer in 2017, with combined sales of its Model S and X totaling 18,723 units (Model 3 sales were not reported). The Model S listed in 2017 as the second best selling vehicle in state's luxury and sports segment, with a market share of 16.0%, only behind the Mercedes-Benz E-Class (12,326). The Chevrolet Bolt led the state's subcompact segment in 2017, with 13,487 units sold, representing a market share of 14.7%, and 57.9% of nationwide sales (23,297).

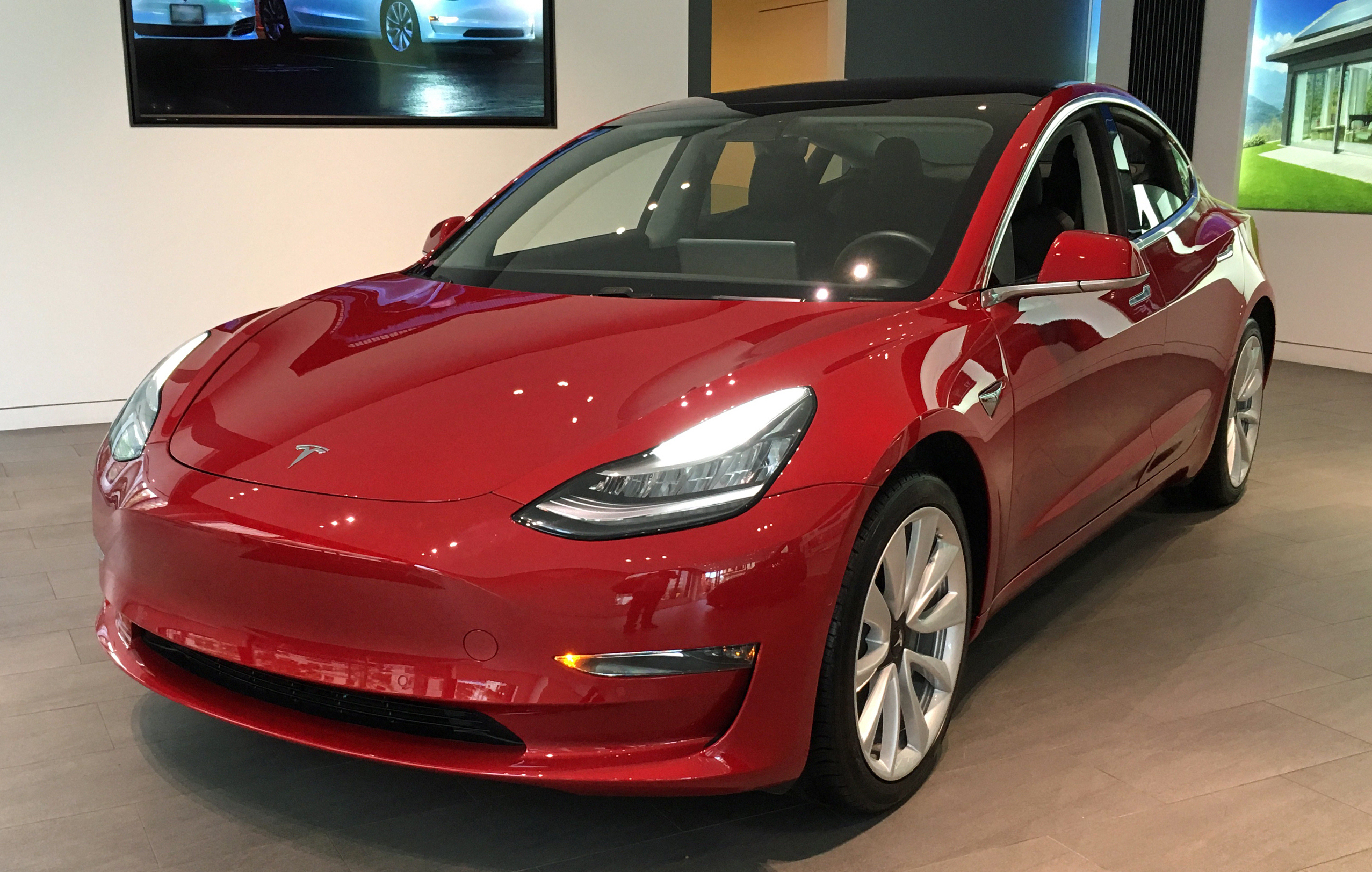
The Tesla Model 3 topped plug-in car sales in California for three years running, from 2018 to 2020.

Tesla ended 2018 as the top selling plug-in car manufacturer with 70,338 units, representing 44% from all plug-in car registrations and 74% all-electric car sales. The Tesla Model 3 was the best selling plug-in car in California in 2018, with 51,293 units registered. The Model 3 also led the near luxury category. Other plug-ins ranking among the top 5 selling models of their segment in 2018 were the Model S (10,120), third in the luxury and high-end sports car category, the Chevrolet Bolt (9,745), second in the subcompact segment, the Model X (8,925), second in the luxury mid-size SUV category, and the BMW i3 (3,988), third in the entry luxury segment. Among passenger car models, the Model 3 ranked fourth, after the Honda Civic (80,190), Toyota Camry (61,553), and the Honda Accord (59,591), and sixth among across all categories, including SUVs and light trucks.

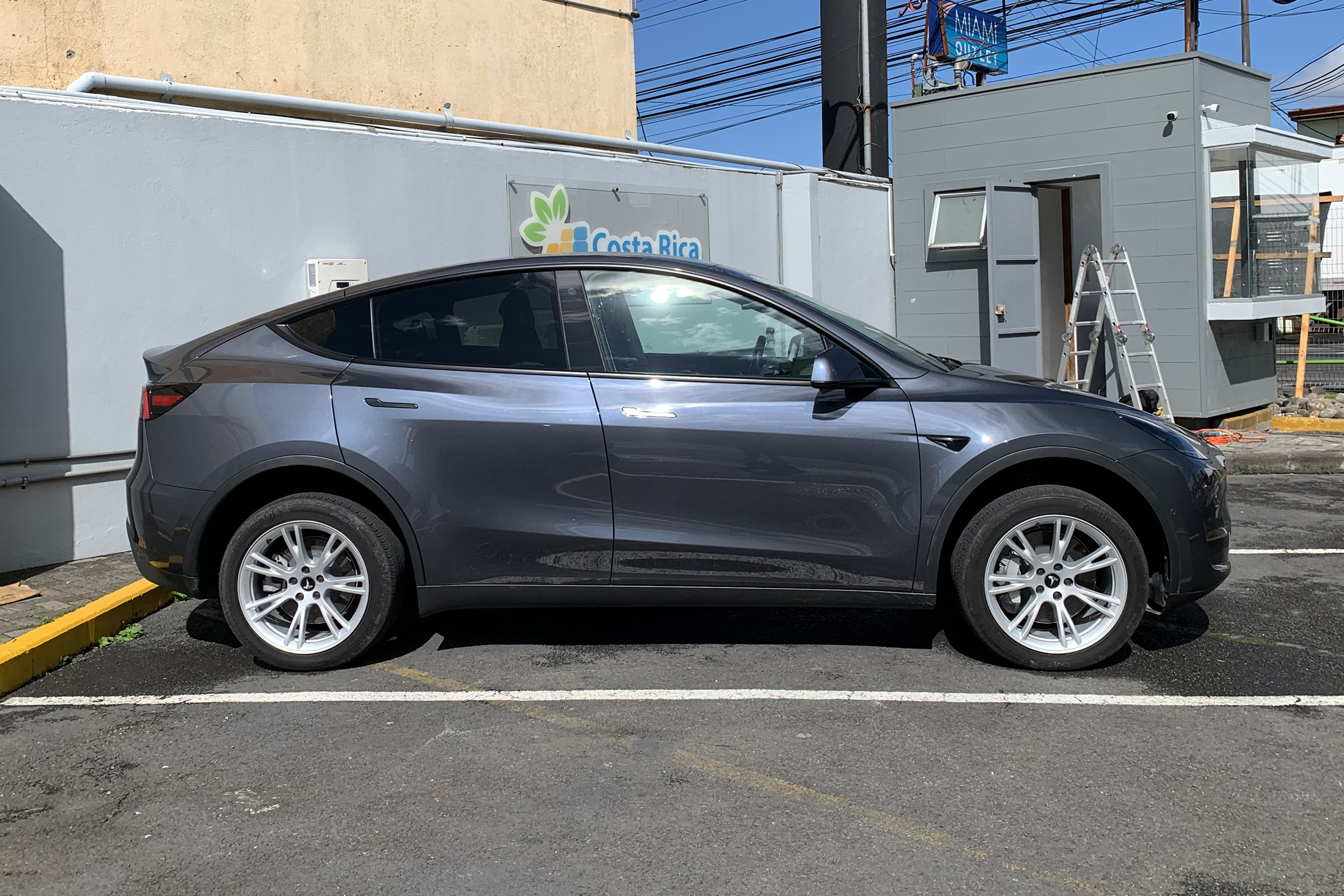
The Tesla Model Y was the top selling plug-in car sales in California in 2021.

Plug-in car sales in 2019 were led for a second consecutive year by the Tesla Model 3 with 59,514 units delivered, representing 59.7% of all pure electric cars registrations in California that year. Once again, the Model 3 also led the near luxury category in 2019 by an ample margin. Among passenger car models registered in California, the Model 3 ranked third, after the Honda Civic (75,915) and the Toyota Camry (63,459).

The Tesla Model 3 listed as the top selling plug-in car in California for three years running, from 2018 to 2020, and also has been the best selling model the near luxury segment for four consecutive years, 2018 to 2021. Model 3 sales totaled 38,580 units, followed by the Tesla Model Y with 20,124, and the Chevrolet Bolt with 8,230. The Model 3 also ranked among California's top selling light-duty vehicles in 2020.

The Tesla Model Y was the best selling plug-in car in 2021 with 60,394 units, ranking second in the overall Californian car market after the Toyota Camry (61,599). The other top selling plug-in cars in their subcategories were the Tesla Model 3 (53,572), Chevrolet Bolt (9,971), Tesla Model S (4,860), and BMW i3 (1,021). The Model 3 also ranked as the fifth best selling car in the overall market, behind the Honda Civic (59,818), and the Toyota RAV4 (59,157), and ahead of the Toyota Corolla ( 48,915).

=== Future trends ===
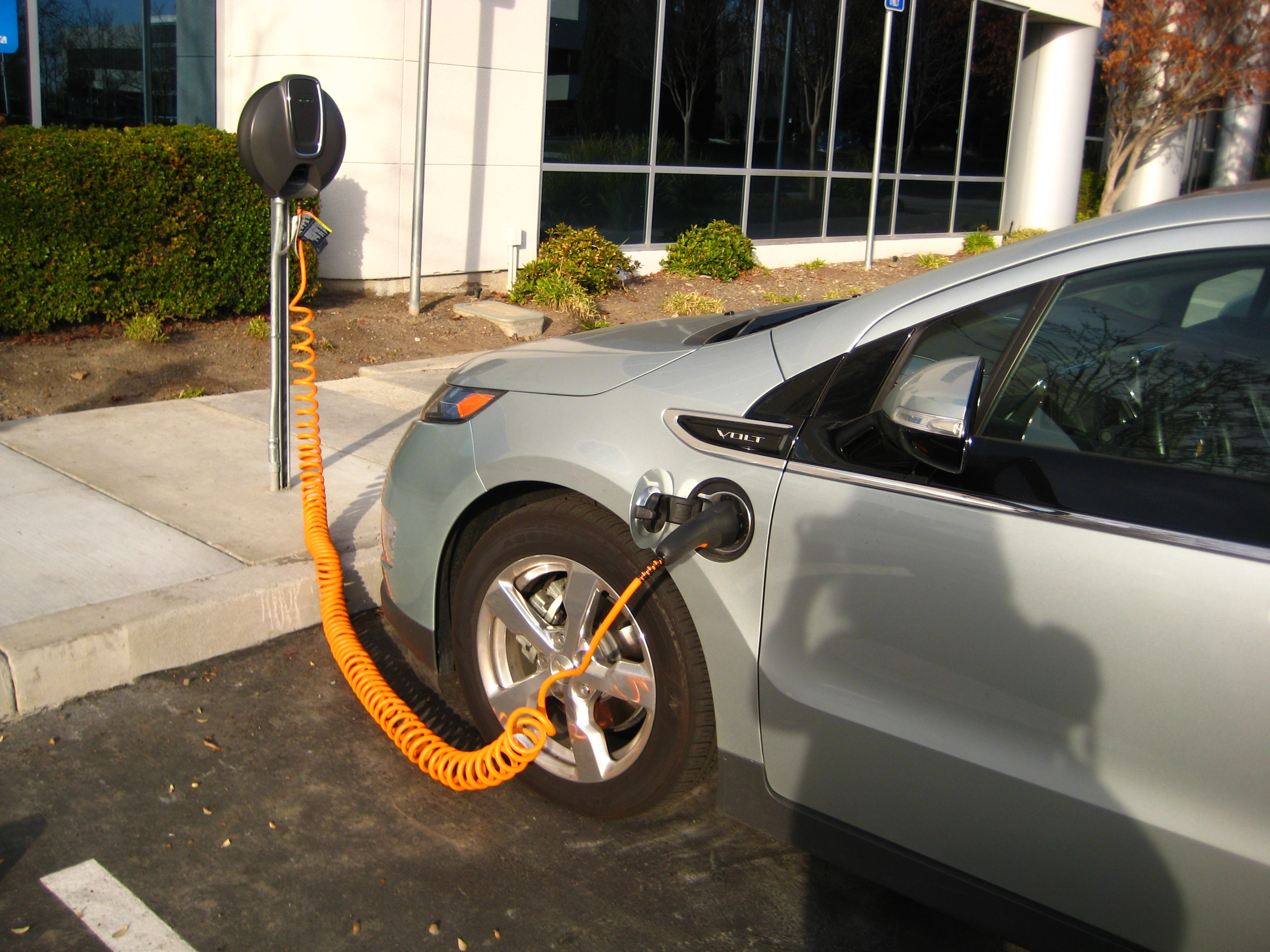
The Chevrolet Volt is the top selling plug-in hybrid in California and the U.S. Shown charging in a public charging point in Fremont, California.

According to a 2011 study by Pike Research, annual sales of plug-in electric vehicles in the U.S. were predicted to reach 360,000 vehicles by 2017. The study projected that the highest sales between 2011 and 2017 would take place in California, New York and Florida. In 2012, and as sales have fallen short of projections, Pike Research projected that annual sales of plug-in electric vehicles in the U.S. will reach 400,073 units in 2020, with California as the state with the highest PEV sales over the remainder of this decade, with nearly 25% of all PEVs sold in the United States between 2012 and 2020. In terms of market share, California will be followed by New York, Florida, Texas, and Washington, but Hawaii is expected by 2020 to have the highest penetration rate of PEVs as a percentage of all light duty vehicle sales. California is predicted to have four of the top ten metropolitan areas for PEV sales: Los Angeles–Long Beach, San Francisco Bay Area, Silicon Valley, and Greater Sacramento. Pike Research forecasts that cumulative sales of PEVs in the largest 102 American cities will reach more than 1.8 million from 2012 through 2020, with a share of more than 25% of all annual sales concentrated in the top five metropolitan areas for PEV sales: New York, Los Angeles, San Francisco, Seattle, and Portland.

In a report published in April 2014, Navigant Research forecasts that the Los Angeles metropolitan area, the largest PEV city market in the world, will have over 15,000 PEV sales in 2014, and its PEV stock will grow from over 36,000 in 2014 to over 250,000 by 2023. Navigant predicts annual PEV sales in the Greater Tokyo Area will surpass Los Angeles by 2020, and Tokyo is expected to become the world's largest PEV city market with a PEV stock of around 260,000 in 2023.

== By region ==
As of mid 2013, 52% of American plug-in electric car registrations are concentrated in five metropolitan areas, two of which are in California: San Francisco and Los Angeles. The others are Seattle, New York and Atlanta.

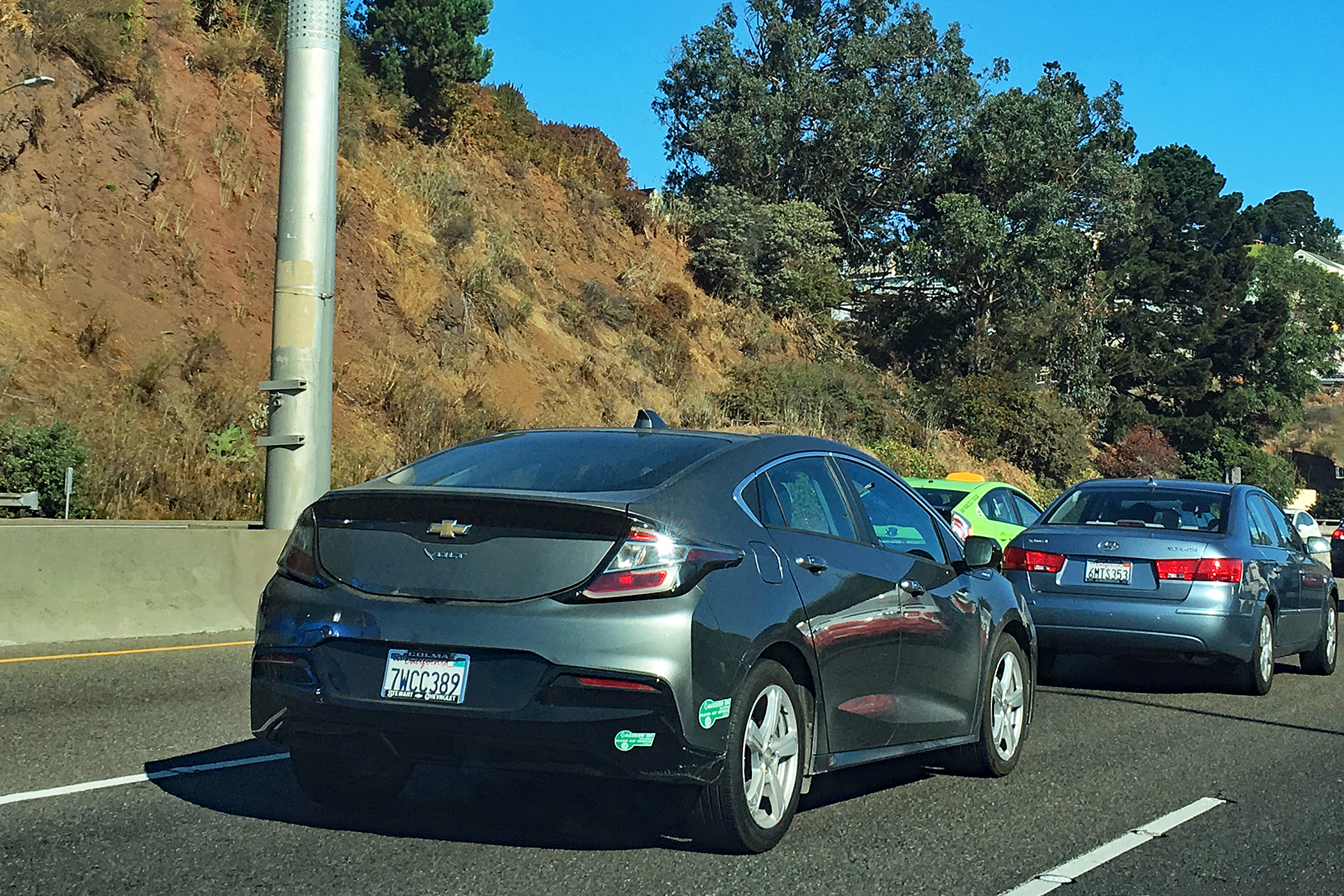
Northern California had the highest plug-in car market share (8.7%) during the first half of 2018. Shown a Chevrolet Volt on U.S. Highway 101 near Bernal Heights, San Francisco.

According to Navigant Research, the Los Angeles metropolitan area was the world's largest plug-in electric car city market in 2014. A study from the International Council on Clean Transportation (ICCT) published in 2016 found that in 2015 there were 30 cities in California with a plug-in electric car market share between 6% and 18% of new vehicle sales in the state, representing 8 to 25 times that of the U.S. average plug-in market share in 2015. The study found these cities tend to be smaller, and the following twelve have a plug-in market share of 10% or more: Saratoga, Los Altos, Los Gatos, Palo Alto, Menlo Park, Cupertino, Fremont, Manhattan Beach, Campbell, Morgan Hill, Mountain View, and Berkeley. With the exception of Manhattan Beach, the other eleven cities are located in the San Francisco Bay Area.

The ICCT study found that the 30 cities with the highest plug-in electric vehicle uptake underwent the implementation of abundant, wide-ranging electric vehicle promotion programs involving parking, permitting, fleets, utilities, education, and workplace charging. These cities on average have 5 times the public charging infrastructure per capita than the national average. In addition, workplace charging availability in the San Jose metropolitan area is far higher than elsewhere in the U.S. Also, major California public electric power utilities and workplaces are expanding the public charging network to further address consumer confidence and convenience.

According to the ICCT study, higher income is found to be among the factors that are linked to higher electric vehicle uptake, with some cities where the Tesla Model S was the top-selling plug-in electric car with more than a third of overall plug-in sales. As of April 2016, out of the fourteen plug-in hybrid models available in the American market, nine are upscale models affordable only for high income customers, namely the BMW X5 xDrive, Audi A3 e-tron, Porsche Cayenne and Panamera, Volvo XC90, Mercedes S500, BMW i8 and 3 Series, and the Cadillac ELR, all priced above US$40,000. Nevertheless, cities with median incomes below US$85,000, such as Berkeley, Alameda, San Jose, Santa Cruz, and Oakland might be more indicative of the growing mainstream plug-in electric vehicle market. These cities have a broader mix of plug-in car sales, such as the Nissan Leaf, Ford C-Max and Fusion Energi, Chevrolet Volt, and Volkswagen e-Golf.

According to the California New Car Dealers Association (CNCDA), during the first half of 2018, Northern California led the state in terms of plug-in car market share, with a total plug-in take-rate of 8.7%, 5.0% for all-electrics (includes fuel cell) and 3.7% for plug-in hybrids. Southern California ranked next with a market share of 6.1%, 2.9% for all-electrics (includes fuel cell) and 3.2% for plug-in hybrids. Both regional markets surpassed the market share of conventional hybrids, 4.8% and 3.8% correspondingly. The leading regional market is the San Francisco Bay Area, with a combined market share of 12.8% for the first half of 2018, 7.7% for all-electrics (includes fuel cell) and 5.1% for plug-in hybrids. Ranking next is Los Angeles and Orange counties with 6.9%, San Diego County with a combined market share of 6.8%, and Central Valley with 4.0%.

=== Los Angeles ===
As of 2018, there were 143,000 electric vehicles in the Los Angeles metropolitan area.

As of April 2022, there were 124 battery electric vehicles and 46 plug-in hybrid vehicles in the Los Angeles city fleet.

=== Sacramento ===
As of 2023, 25% of new cars sold in Sacramento County and 21.5% of new cars sold in El Dorado County were electric.

=== San Diego ===
As of June 2023, 22.1% of new cars sold in San Diego County were electric.

=== San Francisco Bay Area ===
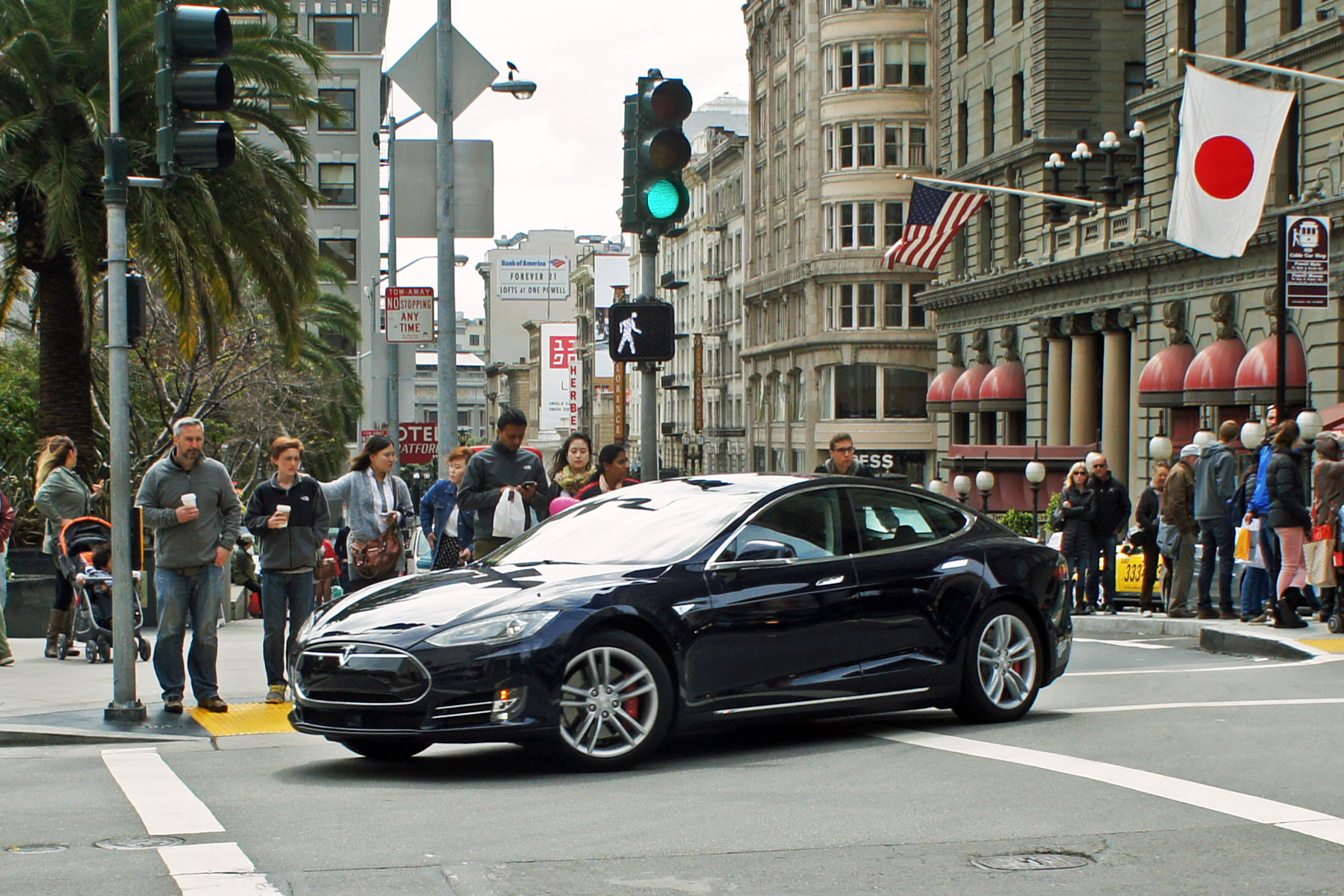
California's leading regional market is the San Francisco Bay Area, with a combined market share of 12.8% for the first half of 2018. Shown a Tesla Model S in downtown San Francisco.

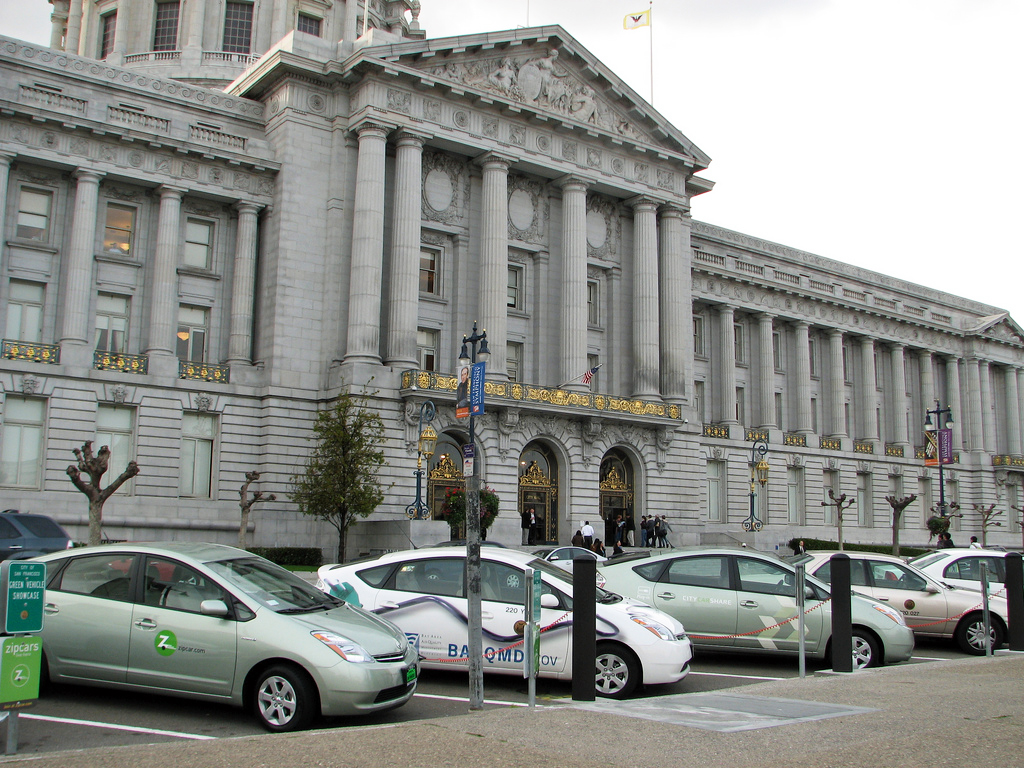
Several plug-in converted hybrids at the public charging station in front of San Francisco City Hall in 2009

In 2008, San Francisco Mayor Gavin Newsom, San Jose Mayor Chuck Reed and Oakland, California Mayor Ron Dellums announced a nine-step policy plan for transforming the Bay Area into the "Electric Vehicle (EV) Capital of the U.S." and of the world.

There are partnerships with Coulomb Technologies, Better Place, City Carshare, Zipcar and others are also advancing. The first charging stations went up in San Jose.

By early 2010, San Francisco and other cities in the San Francisco Bay Area and Silicon Valley, as well as some local private firms such as Google and Adobe Systems, already have deployed charging stations and have expansion plans to attend both plug-ins and all-electric cars.

As of 2018, the San Francisco and San Jose metropolitan areas contained more than 50,000 electric vehicles each. As of 2018, more than 10% of new cars sold in San Jose and 7% of new cars sold in San Francisco were electric.

In March 2024, the SF Municipal Transportation Agency and partners announced a "Curbside Electric Vehicle (EV) Charging Citywide Assessment" program.

== Actions by companies and organizations ==
=== Electric utilities ===
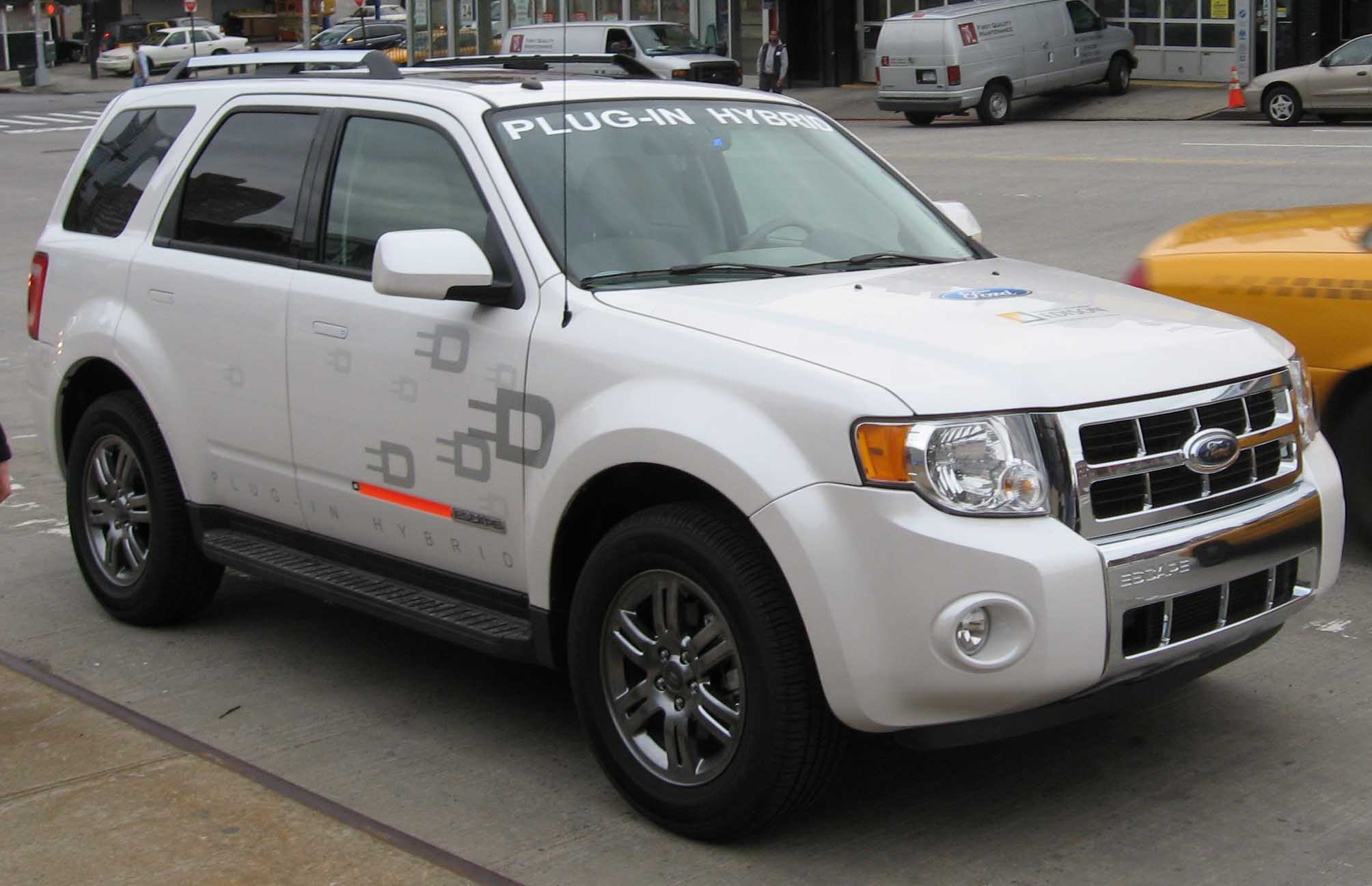
Reconfigured Ford Escape plug-in hybrid in 2008

In 2007, Ford Motor Company CEO Alan Mulally said he expected Ford to sell plug-in hybrids in five to ten years, the launch date depending on advances in lithium-ion battery technology. Ford will provided Southern California Edison with 20 Ford Escape Hybrid sport utility vehicles reconfigured to work as plug-ins by 2009, with the first by the end of 2007.

=== EV Charging for All Coalition ===
The EV Charging for All Coalition works Statewide to bring equal EV charging opportunities to multifamily building residents.

==== PHEV Research Center ====
The PHEV Research Center in the University of California, Davis, administered by ITS-Davis, was launched in 2007 with fundings from the California Air Resources Board and the California Energy Commission’s Public Interest Energy Research (PIER) Program. Its goals are to provide technology and policy guidance to the state, and to help solve research questions and address commercialization issues for PHEVs.

==== CalCars ====
CalCars was a charitable, non-profit organization founded in 2002 to promote plug-in hybrid electric vehicles (PHEVs) as a key to addressing global warming both nationally and internationally.

==== RechargeIT ====
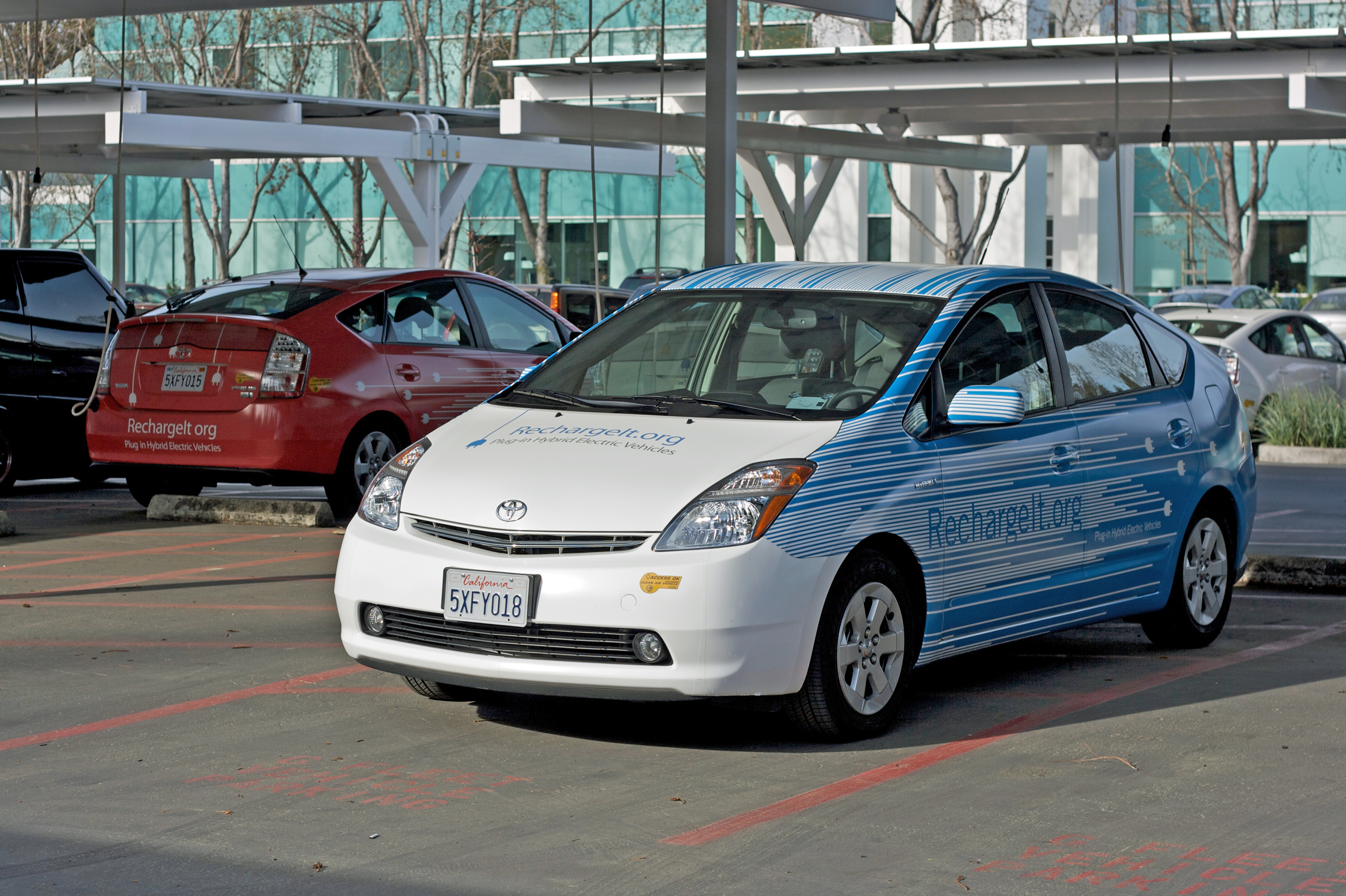
RechargeIT plug-in hybrids converted Toyota Prius at the Googleplex campus in Mountain View, California

RechargeIT is an effort within Google.org, the charitable arm of Google, that aims to reduce CO_{2} emissions, cut oil use, and stabilize the electrical grid by accelerating the adoption of plug-in electric vehicles.

The program began in 2007, and by 2010 Google's Mountain View campus has 100 available charging stations for its share-use fleet of converted plug-ins available to its employees through a free car-sharing program. Solar panels are used to generate the electricity, and this pilot program is being monitored on a daily basis and performance results are published in RechargeIT website. In addition to the data collected for two years when the converted plug-ins were driven by Google employees, RechargeIT set up a controlled test using plug-in converted Ford Escape Hybrids and Toyota Prius. The results of the seven-week driving experiment showed an average fuel economy of 93 mpg average across all trips, and 115 mpg for city trips. Consistently the converted Prius obtained a higher mileage than the Ford Escape.

== See also ==
- Electric car use by country
- FreedomCAR
- Government incentives for plug-in electric vehicles
- List of modern production plug-in electric vehicles available in the United States
- Plug In America
- Plug-in Hybrid Electric Vehicle Research Center
