= Epic =

Epic commonly refers to:

- Epic poetry, a long narrative poem celebrating heroic deeds and events significant to a culture or nation
- Epic film, a genre of film defined by the spectacular presentation of human drama on a grandiose scale

Epic(s) or EPIC(s) may also refer to:

== Arts, entertainment, and media ==
=== Film ===
- Epic (1985 Australian film), directed by Yoram Gross
- Epic (2013 American film), directed by Chris Wedge
- Epic Movie, a 2007 American film directed by Jason Friedberg and Aaron Seltzer
- EPiC: Elvis Presley in Concert, 2025 film
- Epic (2026 film), Indian film directed by Aditya Haasan

=== Gaming ===
- Epic (tabletop game), a series of tabletop wargames
- Epic (play-by-mail game)
- Epic (video game), a 1992 video game
- Epic: Battle for Moonhaven, a 2013 video game by Gameloft based on the film Epic (2013)
- Epic Card Game, a 2015 strategy card game by White Wizard Games

=== Literature ===
- Epic (Kostick novel), a 2004 novel by Conor Kostick
- Epic Illustrated, a 1980s anthology series published by Marvel Comics

=== Music ===
==== Albums ====
- Epic (Blood on the Dance Floor album), 2011
- Epic (Borknagar album), 2004
- Epic (R. Kelly album), 2010
- Epic (Sharon Van Etten album), 2010
- Epic (Tang Dynasty album), 1998
- Epic: The Musical, 2020s series of albums by Jorge Rivera-Herrans
- Epic: The Poetry of War, 2001 album by Kataklysm

==== Songs ====
- "Epic" (Faith No More song), 1990
- "Epic" (Sandro Silva & Quintino song), 2011
- "Epic" (Big Time Rush song), 2011
- "Epic", a song by Sentenced from North from Here
- "Epic", a song by Regurgitator from their eleventh studio album Invader, 2024

=== Genres ===
- Epic (genre), a genre of narrative
- Epic fantasy, a subgenre of fantasy literature
- Epic trance, a subgenre of trance music

=== Other uses in arts, entertainment, and media ===
- Epic TV, an Indian Hindi-language TV channel
- Epic Comics, an imprint of Marvel Comics
- Epic Records, a record label subsidiary of Sony

== Brands and enterprises ==
- Epic, a telecommunications company owned by Monaco Telecom
  - Epic (Cyprus), a telecommunications provider in Cyprus, formerly MTN Cyprus
  - Epic (Malta), a telecommunications provider in Malta, formerly Vodafone Malta
- Epic!, a children's subscription-based reading and learning platform
- Epic Aircraft, an aircraft manufacturer in Bend, Oregon
- Epic Films, an Australian film production company
- Epic Games, an American video game company
- Epic Systems, a healthcare software company in Verona, Wisconsin
- Epics (company), a Japanese video game developer
- Red Epic, a motion picture camera produced by Red Digital Cinema

== Organizations ==
- Education for Peace in Iraq Center, a charitable organization located in Washington, D.C.
- El Paso Intelligence Center, a Drug Enforcement Agency building in El Paso, Texas
- Electors Photo Identity Card, the standard form of voter ID in India
- Electronic Privacy Information Center, an independent non-profit research center
- End Poverty in California, a political movement led by Upton Sinclair
- Établissement public à caractère industriel et commercial, a type of public-sector body in France and other countries
- European Photonics Industry Consortium, an association of photonics companies based in Paris
- Epic Energy, owner and operator of gas pipelines in South Australia

== Places ==
- EPIC The Irish Emigration Museum, located in Dublin's Docklands
- Epic Residences & Hotel, a skyscraper in Downtown Miami completed in 2008
- East Plano Islamic Center, or EPIC Masjid, a mosque located in Plano, Texas
- Energy Production and Infrastructure Center, at the University of North Carolina at Charlotte
- Exhibition Park in Canberra, a large showground and multi-building venue in Australia

== Technology ==
- EPIC (form factor), a single-board computer form factor based on the PC/104
  - EPIC Express, an EPIC board with PCI Express capability
- Epic (web browser)
- Epic, a large user story in software development and product management
- Earth Polychromatic Imaging Camera, an earth-facing camera in the Deep Space Climate Observatory satellite
- Electromagnetic Personal Interdiction Control
- Embedded Programmable Interrupt Controller
- EPICS, a software environment for distributed control systems
- Evolutionary Process for Integrating COTS-Based Systems
- Explicitly parallel instruction computing, a CPU architecture design philosophy
- Expansion via Prediction of Importance with Contextualization, a learned sparse retrieval algorithm

== Other uses ==
- Ecliptic Plane Input Catalog, a database of stars and planets
- Elderly Pharmaceutical Insurance Coverage, a New York State program to help old people pay for medications
- Engineering Projects in Community Service, a university program to give engineering students practical experience
- Epic Mazur (born 1970), an American rapper
- EPIC (spaceflight), a planned spaceflight mission of the European Space Agency
- EPIC, the term for a ticker symbol in the United Kingdom prior to 1996
- Epic morphism, or epimorphism, a mathematical concept
- European Prospective Investigation into Cancer and Nutrition, a Europe-wide cohort study of diet and cancer
- Exceptional Performance on Initial Contract, a provision in the WNBA salary cap rules
- Norwegian Epic, a cruise ship
- Excellence in Prehospital Injury Care, a program at the University of Arizona College of Medicine – Tucson
- Dodge EPIC, a concept battery electric minivan later produced as the Dodge Caravan EPIC and Plymouth Voyager EPIC for lease to fleets
- Vauxhall Epic, also known as the Envoy Epic, a small family car

== See also ==
- EPCI, or Engineering, Procurement, Installation and Commissioning, a construction-industry contract
- Eipic (disambiguation)
- Epica (disambiguation)
- Epik (disambiguation)
- Epix (disambiguation)
- Epoch (disambiguation)
- The Epic (disambiguation)
