= Chrysler TEVan =

Historical electric vehicle

Chrysler TEVan; Dodge Caravan Electric; Plymouth Voyager Electric

Overview
- Model years: 1993–1995

Body and chassis
- Layout: FF
- Platform: Chrysler minivans (AS)

Powertrain
- Electric motor: DC
- Transmission: Two-speed
- Battery: NiFe or NiCd
- Electric range: 50–60 mi (80–97 km)

The Chrysler TEVan, also known as the Dodge Caravan Electric or Plymouth Voyager Electric, was a battery electric vehicle produced from 1993 to 1995 by Chrysler, based on the contemporary gasoline-powered second generation Chrysler minivans, and sold primarily to electric utilities throughout the United States.

== History ==
The Chrysler TEVan was developed in partnership with the Electric Power Research Institute (EPRI), a voluntary association funded by electric utility members. Its name was derived from the internal model code (T-0115), motive power (Electric), and body style (Van). The TEVan model name was used for prototypes; Chrysler also marketed the minivans as the Dodge Caravan Electric and Plymouth Voyager Electric. Previously, EPRI had developed the G-Van, which integrated the lead-acid battery electric powertrain from the GMC Griffon (rebadged from the Bedford CF2) with a standard General Motors van body and chassis.

Production began in late 1992. Over three years, 56 were built in total and most were sold at a list price of US$120,000 (equivalent to $267,000 in 2025) each upon their introduction. The first five were delivered to east coast utilities in April 1993; prices would be reduced to US$100,000 in March 1994. However, the cost of production was estimated at US$250,000 to US$300,000 per vehicle.

Half were produced using nickel-iron battery (NiFe) chemistry and half were equipped with nickel-cadmium battery (NiCd) chemistry. The TEVan was built on the same production line as the conventional minivans at Windsor Assembly in Ontario, Canada. It had a top speed of 70 mph (110 km/h), seating for five adults, and a curb weight of 5,060 lb (2,295 kg). Between March 3 and March 11, 1993, a prototype TEVan completed a 2,500 mi (4,000 km) road trip from Detroit, Michigan to Los Angeles, California in 155 hours, recharging approximately every hour. The pulse charger was developed by Norvik Traction, and was powered by a diesel generator towed behind a tractor-trailer; it was able to recharge the NiCd battery pack in 30 minutes.

== Technical details ==
=== Batteries ===
The 180V NiCd pack consisted of 30 SAFT STM5-180 6V 180Ah batteries in six removable pods under the floor of the car, delivering over 50 miles (80 km) of range. During the demonstration drive from Detroit to Los Angeles, several cells overheated and were replaced.

The NiFe pack consisted of 30 Eagle-Picher 6V 200Ah batteries in six pods under the floor and delivered more than 60 miles (97 km) of range. Chrysler claimed the pack had a lifetime of 100,000 mi (160,000 km). A Chrysler executive testified the vehicle had 80 miles (130 km) of range on the SAE C-Cycle. Data from an early prototype stated the nickel-iron battery pack weighed 2,100 lb (950 kg) and provided a range of 120 mi (190 km). By 1991, the prototype battery pack weight had been reduced to 1,800 lb (820 kg). Because NiFe batteries consume water and generate hydrogen gas during operation, an automated water replenishment system and a gas dispersal system were included.

=== Charger ===
The TEVan's on-board charger was a PFC Martin-Marietta and accepted 120 VAC@20A or 40A, 240 VAC@20A or 40A, and as high as 220 VAC@40A- three-phase inputs. Regenerative braking was possible.

In 1992, Chrysler announced a partnership with Norvik Traction to develop an on-board pulse charger compatible with lead-acid, NiFe, NiCd, and NiMH battery chemistries. A stationary system developed by Norvik was able to charge the NiCd battery from empty to full in 25 minutes using a 480 V supply.

=== Powertrain ===
The prototype TEVan was fitted with a 35 hp (26 kW) DC traction motor, giving it a top speed of 65 mph (105 km/h). The production TEVan used a 27 hp, 65 hp max (48 kW) Separately-Excited GE DC traction motor coupled to a two-speed FWD trans-axle that featured Hi, Lo, Reverse and Park. The owner's manual referred to it as a 'semi-automatic transmission' although it used a clutch. The motor controller was also manufactured by GE.

The production TEVan had a payload of 800 lb (360 kg) and was able to accelerate from 0–50 mph (0–80 km/h) in 31 seconds.

=== Accessories ===
The TEVan had an 8.8 kW three-stage ceramic electric heater. The 120A DC/DC converter provided all the 12v power, there was no auxiliary (12V) battery. Gauges included motor temperature and SOC (state of charge, akin to "Fuel Level") using the stock instruments. It was also equipped with electric air conditioning (R-134a), regenerative braking, power brakes using a Delco electric vacuum pump, power steering, AM/FM Stereo, and airbags. The original equipment tires were Low Rolling Resistance (LRR) Goodyear P205/75R15 Momentum at 50PSI.

== Successor (EPIC) ==
After the third generation Chrysler minivans were introduced, a similar electric-powered variant named the EPIC (Electric Powered Interurban Commuter Vehicle), taking its name from the 1992 Dodge EPIC concept, was launched in 1997 with advanced lead acid batteries and later in 1998 with nickel metal-hydride (NiMH) batteries. It was offered for lease in New York and California in 1999.

The NiMH battery weighed 1,200 lb (540 kg) with coolant. It was equipped an AC traction motor and single speed transmissions. The reduced battery weight improved performance, giving the 1998 EPIC a maximum payload of 945 lb (429 kg) and acceleration of 0–50 mph (0–80 km/h) in 12 seconds; range improved to 80 mi (130 km).
