= Epoch (comics) =

Epoch, in comics, may refer to:

- Epoch (DC Comics), a DC Comics time-traveling character
- Epoch (Marvel Comics), a Marvel Comics character, the offspring of Eon
- Epoch (Top Cow/Heroes and Villains), a comic series about a super-natural tournament featuring main character Jonah Wright

== See also ==
- Epoch (disambiguation)
