= List of United States Navy weapons =

== Shipboard systems ==
- Aegis combat system
- Ship Self-Defense System
- MK 45 5-inch gun
- Phalanx CIWS
- RGM-84 Harpoon
- Naval Strike Missile
- AGM-158C LRASM
- BGM-109 Tomahawk
- RIM-66 Standard (SM-1MR/SM-2MR)
- RIM-67 Standard (SM-1ER/SM-2ER)
- RIM-116 Rolling Airframe Missile
- RIM-161 Standard (SM-3)
- RIM-174 Standard (SM-6)
- RIM-162 Evolved Sea Sparrow Missile
- RUM-139 VL-ASROC
- Mark 46 torpedo
- Mark 48 torpedo
- Mark 50 torpedo
- Mark 54 torpedo
- Mark 60 Captor Mine
- Trident (D5) Ballistic missile

== Aircraft systems ==
- M61 Vulcan
- AGM-84 Harpoon
- AGM-88 HARM
- AGM-65 Maverick
- AGM-119 Penguin
- AGM-154 Joint Standoff Weapon
- AIM-9 Sidewinder
- AIM-7 Sparrow
- AIM-120 AMRAAM
- AGM-84H/K SLAM-ER
- JDAM GPS-guided bombs
- Paveway laser-guided bombs
- CBU-100 Cluster Bomb
- B61 nuclear bomb
- Mark 82 dumb bomb
- Mk 77 incendiary bomb
- SCALPEL

== See also ==
- Electromagnetic Personnel Interdiction Control, prototype weapon
