= Deep Impact =

Deep Impact may refer to:

- Deep Impact (film), a 1998 disaster film
- Deep Impact (spacecraft), a NASA spacecraft launched in 2005
- Deep Impact (horse), a Japanese racehorse
- "Deep Impact" (Dream Corp, LLC episode)
- "Deep Impact", a song by Dragon Ash
- DeepImpact, a learned sparse retrieval algorithm

== See also ==
- Impact event
