= Dodge EPIC =

Concept electric car

Body and chassis
- Layout: FF
- Platform: Chrysler minivans (AS)
- Related: Chrysler TEVan

Powertrain
- Electric motor: DC
- Transmission: Two-speed
- Battery: PbA or NiFe
- Electric range: 120 mi (190 km) (claimed)

The Dodge EPIC was a concept battery electric minivan designed and built by Dodge, using the drivetrain from the Chrysler TEVan. The EPIC was first shown at the 1992 North American International Auto Show. EPIC stands for Electric Power Interurban Commuter. After the show car was unveiled in 1992, a production version based on the third generation Chrysler minivans was made available to fleets between 1997 and 2003, sold as the Dodge Caravan EPIC and Plymouth Voyager EPIC.

== History ==
=== Concept ===
The Chrysler TEVan had been in development since before 1990, when a prototype was shown to journalists; the battery electric drivetrain was reused for the concept EPIC, which was shown first at the 1992 North American International Auto Show. The styling was considered futuristic at the time; unlike contemporary, boxy minivans, the EPIC had a streamlined, oval body, which inspired the design of the third generation of the Chrysler minivans.

The concept EPIC appeared in the first episode of the 1994–1999 NBC TV series Viper.

=== Production ===
Dodge Caravan EPIC; Plymouth Voyager EPIC
- Dodge Caravan EPIC

Overview
- Model years: 1997–2004
- Assembly: Windsor Assembly

Body and chassis
- Layout: FF
- Platform: Chrysler minivans (NS)

Powertrain
- Electric motor: AC synchronous
- Transmission: Single-speed
- Battery: PbA or 360 V NiMH
- Electric range: 80–90 mi (130–140 km) (NiMH)
- Plug-in charging: 208–240 VAC or 440 VDC

Dimensions
- Wheelbase: 2,870 mm (113 in)

In 1993, Chrysler began producing the TEVan for fleet sales. This was a version of the contemporary second generation Caravan with an electric drivetrain; approximately 50 were built before production was discontinued in 1995.

A battery electric variant of the short-wheelbase third generation Chrysler minivans was introduced in 1997 for lease to fleets as the Dodge Caravan EPIC and Plymouth Voyager EPIC, taking the EPIC suffix from the earlier 1992 concept, equipped with high-voltage lead acid batteries. The first 17 Dodge Caravan EPIC minivans were delivered to government clients in California by June 1997: six to Naval Construction Battalion Center Port Hueneme, five to March Air Force Base, four to McClellan Air Force Base, and two to Southern California Edison. Fewer than 20 were leased with the lead-acid batteries. In 1998, nickel metal-hydride (NiMH) batteries were fitted with production scheduled to begin in October, and it was offered for lease to fleets in New York and California starting with the 1999 model year.

Production ceased in 2003. The batteries were removed from the fifty EPICs produced that year; the vehicles were crushed and scrapped before any were sold.

=== Reintroduction ===
Chrysler Corporation reportedly had plans to reintroduce a battery electric minivan, as shown by concepts it developed after purchasing Global Electric Motorcars (GEM) in 2000, such as the Chrysler EV and Chrysler ecoVoyager. The van would have specifications that were similar to the EPIC. Chrysler killed off the plan in 2011, and sold its GEM brand to the ATV and snowmobile manufacturer Polaris shortly after.

== Technical details ==
=== 1992 EPIC concept ===
The TEVan was fitted with a DC traction motor which was manufactured by General Electric, featuring an output of 70 hp (52 kW) peak, 35 hp (26 kW) continuous. The motor was coupled to a two-speed FWD trans-axle that featured Hi, Lo, Reverse and Park. The TEVan was equipped with either lead-acid or nickel-iron battery chemistries.

The concept EPIC used the same drivetrain as the TEVan; as equipped with the nickel-iron cells, the vehicle had a maximum range of 120 miles (193 km) on only one charge and had a top speed of 65 mph (105 km/h).

=== 1997 production EPIC ===
The production EPIC, based on the third generation minivans, was equipped an AC traction motor and single speed transmission, with a peak output of 100 hp (75 kW) and continuous output of 75 hp (56 kW), giving it a top speed of 80 mph (130 km/h).

With the lead-acid battery, the EPIC had a range of 68 mi (109 km). As tested by Southern California Edison, urban range varied from 46.2 to 58.6 mi (74.4 to 94.3 km), depending on load, and freeway range varied from 52.6 to 60.8 mi (84.7 to 97.8 km); total energy used was approximately 32–35 kW-hr, as measured from AC energy drawn by the charger after each test, which includes charging losses.

The NiMH battery used 30 cells manufactured by Saft, with each cell operating at 12 V and providing 1 kW-hr of storage, giving an aggregated capacity of 30 kW-hr; the entire battery pack weighed 1,200 lb (540 kg) with coolant.

The reduced battery weight improved performance, giving the 1999 EPIC a maximum payload of 945 lb (429 kg) and acceleration of 0–50 mph (0–80 km/h) in 12 seconds; range improved to 80 mi (130 km) under the SAE J1634 testing cycle. As tested by Southern California Edison, urban range varied from 63.6 to 82.0 mi (102.4 to 132.0 km), depending on load, and freeway range varied from 68.6 to 99.3 mi (110.4 to 159.8 km); total energy used was approximately 50–55 kW-hr, as measured from AC energy drawn by the charger after each test, which includes charging losses. Per the manufacturer, the production EPIC had a maximum payload (including passengers) of 800 lb (360 kg) with a 5,900 lb (2,700 kg) GVWR, giving an estimated kerb weight of 5,100 lb (2,300 kg).

A 440 V DC charger was able to recharge the battery within half an hour; the standard charger operated on 208–240 V AC with a six to eight hour charge time.
