= Epoch (disambiguation) =

An epoch is an instant in time chosen as the origin of a particular calendar era.

Epoch or EPOCH may also refer to:

== Time-related ==
- Epoch (astronomy), a moment in time used as a reference for the orbital elements of a celestial body
- Epoch (computing), a moment from which system time is usually measured
- Epoch (cosmology) or cosmologic epoch, a phase in the development of the universe since the Big Bang
- Epoch (geology), a span of time on the geologic time scale shorter than a period and longer than an age
- Epoch (race), racial periods in Blavatsky's esoteric theory of the root races
- Unix epoch, the starting time for Unix-based operating systems

== Arts and entertainment ==
- Epoch (DC Comics), a supervillain also known as the Lord of Time
- Epoch (Marvel Comics), a cosmic entity in the Marvel Comics universe
- Epoch (film), a 2001 American science fiction film
- Epoch (anthology), a 1975 anthology of science fiction stories
- Epoch (video game), a 1981 space combat game for the Apple II
- Epoch (The Brave album), 2016
- Epoch (Tycho album), 2016
- Epoch, a 2006 album by Rip Slyme

== Games ==
- Epoch Co., a Japanese toy and computer games company
  - Epoch Game Pocket Computer, an early hand-held game console produced by Epoch Co.
- Epoch (Chrono Trigger), a flying time machine in role-playing game Chrono Trigger
- Epoch Hunter, a boss in Caverns of Time from the game World of Warcraft

== Publications ==
- Epoch (American magazine), literary magazine of Cornell University
- Epoch (Russian magazine), literary magazine by Fyodor Dostoyevsky and his brother Mikhail
- Ha-Tsfira (lit. Epoch), a Hebrew language newspaper published in 1862 and 1874–1931
- The Epoch Times, a privately owned Falun Gong-linked newspaper

== Science and technology ==
- EPOCH (chemotherapy), a chemotherapy regimen
- EPOCh (Extrasolar Planet Observation and Characterization), a NASA mission associated with EPOXI
- Epoch (machine learning), the training of a model for one cycle through the whole training dataset

== Weapons ==
- Epoch Remote Control Turret

== See also ==
- Aeon or Eon
- Age (geology)
- Epoché (term in Greek philosophy, meaning 'suspension of judgement' or 'withholding of assent')
- Belle Époque (disambiguation)
- Epic (disambiguation)
- Era (span of time with different definitions according to context)
- Periodization
