= The Epic =

The Epic may refer to:

- The Epic (album), by Kamasi Washington
- The Epic (building), skyscraper in New York City
- The Epic (EP), by Citizen Kane
- Ramayana: The Epic, a 2010 Indian animated film based on the ancient Indian epic Ramayana
- Baahubali: The Epic, a 2025 Indian epic action film by S. S. Rajamouli, a re-edited version of Rajamouli's Baahubali: The Beginning (2015) and Baahubali 2: The Conclusion (2017)

== See also ==
- Epic (disambiguation)
