= Epica =

Epica or EPICA may refer to:

- Epica (band), a Dutch symphonic metal band
- Epica (Kamelot album), 2003
- Epica (Audiomachine album), 2012
- The European Project for Ice Coring in Antarctica (EPICA)
- The Epica Awards (International Advertising Awards)
- Daewoo Tosca, also known as Chevrolet Epica or Holden Epica
- Daewoo Magnus, also known as Chevrolet Epica
- Banksia epica, a South Australian native bush

== See also ==
- Epic (disambiguation)
