= Epix (disambiguation) =

Epix is the former name of MGM+, an American premium television channel owned by Metro-Goldwyn-Mayer.

Epix may also refer to:

- Epix (mobile phone), a Samsung mobile phone
- EPIX Pharmaceuticals Inc, a drug company

== See also ==
- Epic (disambiguation)
- Epyx, maker of video games
