= Eipic =

Eipic is the Irish word for "epic".

It may refer to:

- Eipic (restaurant), located in Belfast
- Eipic (TV series), aired in 2016

== See also ==
- Epic (disambiguation)
