= Epik (disambiguation) =

Epik is a domain registrar and web hosting company based in the United States.

Epik or EPIK may also refer to:

- EPIK, English Program in Korea
- Epik, Iran, a village in Alborz Province
- Epik, a 2008 album by Sinnflut

== People with the name ==
- Hryhorii Epik (1901–1937), Ukrainian writer and journalist

== See also ==
- Epik High, a Korean hip hop group
- Epic (disambiguation)
