= European Photonics Industry Consortium =

Not-for-profit association serving the photonics community

The European Photonics Industry Consortium (EPIC) is a not-for-profit association with headquarters in Paris, France. EPIC serves the photonics community through a regular series of workshops, market studies and partnering. EPIC focuses its actions on LEDs and OLEDs for lighting, optical fiber telecommunications, laser manufacturing, sensors, photovoltaics and photonics for life sciences. EPIC coordinates its activities internationally through its membership in the International Optoelectronics Association.

EPIC was founded in 2003 by T.P. Pearsall. The five founding company members were: Aixtron, CDT, Osram, Philips, and Sagem. Today, more than 500 companies, research organizations, universities, and other industry stakeholders are members of the consortium. The membership works together to execute its mission by proposing and implementing initiatives that seek to have an impact on the industrial landscape.

== Photonics ==
Photonics is the science and technology area concerned about light and its application. It includes geometrical, wave and particle approach to light. Term photonics emphasizes including photons in general analysis therefore extending its field beyond traditional optics. It also expands application of light from just lighting to information transmission, signal processing and sensing and many other fields.

Nowadays, photonics is being included into many optoelectronic or mechatronic devices, therefore creating new components, new products and new industries. Some examples are laser diodes, DVD players, and optical fiber telecommunications.

== Mission ==
The European Photonics Industry Consortium has the mission to build solidarity and sustainable growth for photonics companies increasing recognition of photonics as a strategic technology, building business revenues, and creating employment opportunities for scientists and engineers.

== Key initiatives ==
=== Photonics21 European technology platform ===
In 2004 EPIC proposed the creation of a European Technology Platform in photonics to the European Commission. EPIC's members worked in partnership with other European organisations to develop a vision of photonics as a well-defined science leading to disruptive breakthroughs in telecommunications, life sciences, manufacturing, lighting and displays, sensors and education. The European Commission accepted this vision and established the Photonics21 Platform at the end of 2005.

=== Merging optics and nanotechnologies: the MONA roadmap ===
During 2005-2007 EPIC and its members developed and participated in the MONA project to create a study to identify synergies between photonics and nanotechnologies, and to identify opportunities for industry in these areas. The goal of this project is a roadmap leading from the R&D environment to mastering nano-electronics and nano-photonics technologies at an industrial scale. This roadmap has been completed and is available to the public.

=== Network for Exchange of Components Photonics Research : NEXPRESSO ===
Beginning in 2007, EPIC and its members initiated the ACCORD project which purchases prototype photonics components and systems from SMEs and awards them to university R&D groups based on competitive proposals. NEXPRESSO follows ACCORD, (Advanced Components Cooperation for Optoelectronic Research and Development), an exchange initiative also developed by EPIC.

=== Leadership in Fiber Laser Technologies: LIFT ===
EPIC organised and led a consortium of 20 companies, SMEs, and research labs in a proposal to the European Commission for a €17 million project to develop new technologies for higher brilliance fiber lasers. The project has been accepted and started in 2009. EPIC also initiated and manages the Linked-In site for Fiber Lasers.

=== Workshops on key photonics opportunities ===
EPIC organises workshops and symposia on key topics and opportunities identified by its membership. Proceedings and synthesis of these meetings are available to the public. Some examples are presented for workshops developed in collaboration with the SPIE.

Photonics in the Automobile

- Photonics in the Automobile I. Edited by T.P. Pearsall, Proceedings of the SPIE, Volume 5663, (2005).
- Photonics in the Automobile II. Edited by PP. Meyrueis, T.P. Pearsall, Proceedings of the SPIE, Volume 6198, (2006).

Building European OLED Infrastructure

Building European OLED infrastructure, Edited by: T.P. Pearsall, J.Halls, Proceedings of the SPIE, Volume 5961 (2005)

Laser-Assisted Manufacturing – Making the Market Grow

Laser Applications in Europe, Edited by: Gries, T. P. Pearsall, Proceedings of the SPIE, Volume 6157, (2006)

Workshop on Optical Components for Broadband Communication

Optical Components for Broadband Communication, Edited by: P-Y Fonjallaz, T.P. Pearsall, Proceedings of the SPIE, Volume 6350, pp. (2006)

Workshop on Manufacturing LEDs for Lighting and Displays

Manufacturing LEDs for Lighting and Displays, Edited by T.P. Pearsall, Proceedings of the SPIE, Volume 6797, (2007)

Photonics on Silicon

Silicon Photonics and Photonic Integrated Circuits, Edited by: G. C. Righini, S. K. Honkanen, L. Pavesi, L. Vivien, Proceedings of the SPIE, Volume 6996, (2008)
