= Belle Époque (disambiguation) =

Belle Époque refers to a period in European history that began during the late 19th century and lasted until World War I.

Belle Époque or La Belle Époque may also refer to:

- Belle Époque (film), a 1992 Spanish film directed by Fernando Trueba
- Belle Epoque (band), a European disco music group popular in the mid to late 1970s
- La Belle Époque (film), a 2019 French film directed by Nicolas Bedos
- La Belle Epoque (barge), a 1930 luxury barge
- "La Belle Epoque" (song), a 2014 song by Swedish rock band Kent
- La Belle Epoque, album by Orchestra Baobab
- Belle Epoque, an album by Mose Se 'Fan Fan'
- Belle Époque, prestige label of Perrier-Jouët
- Belle Epoch, an EP by the American rock band Deadbeat Darling
