= Learned sparse retrieval =

Document search algorithm

Learned sparse retrieval (LSR) or sparse neural search is an approach to Information Retrieval which uses a sparse vector representation of queries and documents. It borrows techniques both from lexical bag-of-words and vector embedding algorithms, and is claimed to perform better than either alone. The best-known sparse neural search systems are SPLADE and its successor SPLADE v2. Others include DeepCT, uniCOIL, EPIC, DeepImpact, TILDE and TILDEv2, Sparta, SPLADE-max, and DistilSPLADE-max.

Multimodal Learned Sparse Retrieval. LSR approaches have also been extended to the vision-language domain, where they are applied to multimodal data, such as the combination of text and images. This expansion enables the retrieval of relevant content across different modalities, such as finding images based on text queries or vice versa.

Some implementations of SPLADE have similar latency to Okapi BM25 lexical search while giving as good results as state-of-the-art neural rankers on in-domain data.

The Official SPLADE model weights and training code is released under a Creative Commons NonCommercial license. But there are other independent implementations of SPLADE++ (a variant of SPLADE models) that are released under permissive licenses.

SPRINT is a toolkit for evaluating neural sparse retrieval systems.

== Splade ==
SPLADE (Sparse Lexical and Expansion Model) is a neural retrieval model that learns sparse vector representations for queries and documents, combining elements of traditional lexical matching with semantic representations derived from transformer-based architectures. Unlike dense retrieval models that rely on continuous vector spaces, SPLADE produces sparse outputs that are compatible with inverted index structures commonly used in information retrieval systems.

The original SPLADE model was introduced at the 44th International ACM SIGIR Conference in 2021. An updated version, SPLADE v2, incorporated modifications to its pooling mechanisms, document expansion strategies, and training objectives using knowledge distillation. Empirical evaluations have shown improvements on benchmarks such as the TREC Deep Learning 2019 dataset and the BEIR benchmark suite.

These models aim to maintain retrieval efficiency comparable to traditional sparse methods while enhancing semantic matching capabilities, offering a balance between effectiveness and computational cost.
