= Epoch (DC Comics) =

Lord of Time, Epoch
- Epoch as depicted in Superman/Batman #80 (March 2011). Art by Jesus Merino (penciler/inker) and Pete Pantazis (colorist).

Publication information
- Publisher: DC Comics
- First appearance: Justice League of America #10 (March 1962)
- Created by: Gardner Fox (writer); Mike Sekowsky (artist).

In-story information
- Alter ego: Unknown
- Abilities: Super-advanced technology in armour permits time travel and can summon any necessary weapons or paraphernalia from any previously visited time period.

Epoch, also known as The Lord of Time, is a comic book fictional character published by DC Comics. He first appeared in Justice League of America #10 (March 1962) and was created by writer Gardner Fox and artist Mike Sekowsky.

A powerful being from the year 3786, the Lord of Time attacks the Justice League, using his chrono-cube to peel back the fourth-dimensional veil of time. Since his initial defeat by the Justice League, this fugitive from the future learned to move laterally and diagonally through history, accessing armies and armaments spanning millions of years. He desires to conquer space and time. To make sure his bid to rule all reality is successful, he attempted to eliminate the League's ancestors, erasing them from existence. At some point, the Lord of Time created a frozen moment in history called Timepoint, and he will eventually evolve into a being known as Epoch who desires to master the timestream, changing events to grant him power.

Epoch seemingly died in the JLA/WildC.A.T.s crossover, but he returned in the series The Brave and the Bold. Epoch also made an appearance in the Justice League of America 80-Page Giant #1 comic (November 2009), where he battled the Justice League and tossed all the superheroes back in time.

== Fictional character biography ==
Epoch arrived in the mid-20th century with an army of warriors from past and future eras and battled the Justice League for the first time. The battle is short-lived due to the machinations of Felix Faust and the Demons Three, who draw the Justice League away after they defeat part of his armies and navy.

The Justice League returns to defeat the Lord of Time's various armies. He escapes to the year 3786 to recoup his forces and take other weapons, telling the League that they will be unable to find him. Superman uses a time bubble to travel with the other League to that time era, where he destroys the Lord of Time's new weapon.

The Time Lord once again tries to conquer the 20th century by going to the future and taking control of a soldier's mind. He plans to make the soldier steal items which will enable the Lord of Time to regain control of his weapons. Batman and Robin battle him in Gotham City and alert the rest of the JLA, who are at first unable to fight the mind-controlled soldier. The Lord of Time is defeated by the JLA once again just after getting into their era, and the soldier is freed from his control.

The Lord of Time uses an advanced computer known as the Eternity Brain to control the flow of time for his next bid of conquest, though he realises this will stop time and thus destroy the universe as it cannot be halted. He orders the Eternity Brain to retrieve Jonah Hex, Miss Liberty, the Black Pirate, Enemy Ace, and the Viking Prince from their respective eras and have them battle the Justice League and the Justice Society of America. The two teams are beaten in the first battle by the empowered heroes, who are then transported to the Lord of Time's base, a castle in a different dimensional space around the year 3786. A group of them track this trace to the Lord of Time's castle using the Cosmic Treadmill after detecting the trace that leads to the Lord of Time's year. The other heroes had already been defeated and imprisoned. The Brain uses its defences to summon beings from different times to battle them. With seconds to spare, Elongated Man destroys the Eternity Brain.

The Lord of Time seeks refuge in the year 1,000,000,000 A.D. at the end of the world, tired of his quest to rule time and space. Using his own genetic material, he creates a family to ease his loneliness: six sons made in his image and a daughter named Olanda. His boys later inherit their father's thirst for power and rebel against him by stealing his chrono-cube. Calling themselves the Six, they gather weapons from different eras to wage war against the Lord of Time. Months into the war, Steel comes to this era, having been warped forward in time by the villain Warp. The Lord of Time and Olanda ask for his help to get the Lord to the chrono-cube so he can go back in time and prevent the creation of his children. He succeeds in wiping the Six from existence and Steel spends time with Olanda for an indeterminate amount of time before returning to his time.

Sporting a futuristic battlesuit and now calling himself Epoch, he travels through the past to wipe out the members of the Justice League when they are still children. The League, using his chrono-cube, chase after him to prevent his plan. A fail safe in the chrono-cube's computers hurls them to the Wildstorm Universe where they encounter the WildC.A.T.s. This team joins the League in returning to their universe to stop Epoch, who has conquered Earth in the League's absence. The WildC.A.T.s defeat Epoch, who is transported to the beginning of time and caught in the explosion of the Big Bang.

Epoch later returns and battles the DC One Million incarnations of Superman and Batman. He escapes backward in time and faces the original Superman, Batman and Robin, at around the time Dick Grayson was at Hudson University. After his defeat he escapes into the timestream, but the damage to his hourglass means he is repeatedly deposited in front of different Superman/Batman teams, including Superman Secondus and Damian Wayne of the near future; Kent Shakespeare and Brane Taylor of the 31st century; and the Unknown Superman and Batman of the 45th century, before finding himself back in the 853rd century.
