= Chrysler minivans (AS) =

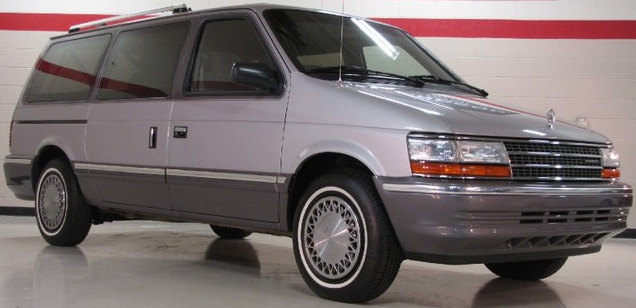
- 1991 Plymouth Grand Voyager LE

Overview
- Manufacturer: Chrysler Corporation
- Also called: Dodge Caravan; Dodge Mini Ram Van (Netherlands); Plymouth Voyager; Chrysler Voyager (Europe); Chrysler Town & Country; Dodge Grand Caravan (LWB); Plymouth Grand Voyager (LWB); Chrysler Grand Voyager (LWB, Europe); 3-Star Grand Caravan (China)
- Production: August 14, 1990 – August 1995
- Model years: 1991–1995
- Assembly: Fenton, Missouri, U.S. (Saint Louis Assembly); Windsor, Ontario, Canada (Windsor Assembly); Graz, Austria (Eurostar); Zhanjiang, Guangdong, China (3-Star)

Body and chassis
- Body style: 3-door minivan
- Layout: Transverse front-engine, front-wheel drive / all-wheel drive
- Platform: Chrysler AS platform

Powertrain
- Engine: 2.5 L K I4; 3.0 L Mitsubishi 6G72 V6; 3.3 L EGA V6; 3.8 L EGH V6; 2.5 L VM 425 turbodiesel I4 (Europe)
- Transmission: 5-speed manual 3-speed A670 automatic 3-speed A413 automatic 4-speed A604 automatic

Dimensions
- Wheelbase: 1991–1993 C/V: 112 in (2,845 mm); SWB & 1994–1995 C/V: 112.3 in (2,852 mm); 1991–1993 C/V Extended: 119.1 in (3,025 mm); C/V AWD: 112 in (2,845 mm); LWB & 1994–1995 C/V Extended: 119.3 in (3,030 mm)
- Length: 1991–1993 C/V: 175.9 in (4,468 mm); 1991–1993 SWB & 1994–95 C/V: 178.1 in (4,524 mm); 1991–1993 C/V Extended: 190.6 in (4,841 mm); LWB: 192.8 in (4,897 mm)
- Width: 72 in (1,828.8 mm); 1991 C/V: 72.2 in (1,834 mm); 1992–1993 C/V: 69.6 in (1,768 mm)
- Height: SWB & 1991–93 C/V: 64.2 in (1,631 mm); Grand Caravan: 64.8 in (1,646 mm); 1991–93 AWD: 65.9 in (1,674 mm); LWB: 66 in (1,676.4 mm); Grand Caravan: 66.7 in (1,694 mm); 1994–95 SE: 64.3 in (1,633 mm)
- Curb weight: 3,305 lb (1,499 kg); 3,531 lb (1,602 kg) (Grand Caravan)

Chronology
- Predecessor: Chrysler minivans (S)
- Successor: Chrysler minivans (NS)

The second-generation Chrysler minivans are a series of minivans that were manufactured and marketed by Chrysler Corporation in North America and Europe from 1991 to 1995. Officially designated the AS platform by Chrysler, the second-generation minivans were an extensive revision of the first-generation chassis and body. As before, passenger and cargo configurations were sold by Dodge, Plymouth, and Chrysler divisions. The first minivans offered with driver-side airbags (in 1991) and with optional integrated child safety seats (in 1992), the second-generation Chrysler minivans offered all-wheel drive as an option for the first time; a manual transmission would be offered for the last time in the North American market.

As with its predecessor, Chrysler assembled second-generation minivans at Windsor Assembly in Windsor, Ontario, Canada, with additional production at Saint Louis (North) Assembly in Fenton, Missouri from 1990 to 1994. In 1992, to supplement exports from the United States, the Chrysler Voyager and Dodge Mini Ram Van began production in Graz, Austria (in the Eurostar joint venture factory between Chrysler and Steyr-Daimler-Puch).

For the 1996 model year, the AS-generation minivans were replaced by the NS platform, marking the first complete redesign of the Chrysler minivans since their 1984 introduction.

== Overview ==
Introduced in November 1990, the second-generation Chrysler minivans were marketed by the Dodge, Plymouth, and Chrysler divisions. The Dodge Caravan and Plymouth Voyager nameplates returned, with both short-wheelbase and long-wheelbase (Grand) body configurations. As with the first-generation minivans, base-trim examples were equipped with 5-passenger seating, with 7-passenger seating as standard in higher-trim versions (SE, LE, ES/LX, and all Town & Country vans).

For 1994, the model range underwent a mid-cycle revision, primarily intended to comply with 1998 upgrades to US federal safety standards for cars (although the entire model range was officially considered a light truck). Alongside minor exterior styling changes, the minivans were given dual airbags, four-wheel disc brakes with ABS, and side impact beams in the front and sliding doors. In another set of revisions, Chrysler sought to make the vans quieter, improving fit and finish.

=== Chassis ===
The second-generation Chrysler minivans are officially designated the Chrysler AS platform (matching the Chrysler shift to two-letter platform designations in 1990). Largely a substantial revision of the first-generation S-platform minivans, the AS chassis retained the 112.0 inch wheelbase for standard-wheelbase vans and 119.1 inches for extended-wheelbase "Grand" vans. Structurally unrelated to the (discontinued) Chrysler K-cars, the second-generation minivans shared mechanical commonality with its larger derivatives, adopting engines and transmissions from the Chrysler AA platform (Dodge Spirit/Plymouth Acclaim) and the Chrysler AC/AY platform (Chrysler New Yorker/Fifth Avenue/Imperial and Dodge Dynasty).

Retaining the unibody construction of the first-generation minivans, the second-generation minivans are fitted with a MacPherson strut front suspension with coil rear springs; all-wheel drive versions have 4-wheel independent suspension with a leaf-sprung rear axle. During the development of the platform, attention was paid on refining the handling over the first-generation vans, in order to improve stability, maneuverability, and steering feel.

For 1991 to 1993, a disc front/rear drum brake configuration was utilized, with a four-wheel disc brake system introduced in 1994. All versions were fitted with anti-lock brakes.

==== Powertrain ====
With the lone exception of the Chrysler 2.5L Turbo I inline-4, the second-generation minivans returned the powertrain from their 1990 predecessors. The standard engine was a naturally-aspirated Chrysler 2.5L inline-four, producing 100 hp; this engine was standard on standard-wheelbase passenger vans and all cargo vans. A Mitsubishi-produced 3.0L V6 (producing 142 hp) was an option on short-wheelbase vans. Introduced in 1990, the Chrysler 3.3L V6 (producing 150 hp; increased to 162 hp in 1994) was standard on all Grand Voyagers/Grand Caravans, Town & Countrys, and vans with all-wheel drive; the 3.3L V6 was offered on short-wheelbase as a second option.

For 1994, the AS-platform minivans adopted the 3.8L V6 engine from the Chrysler Imperial. A larger-bore version of the 3.3L V6 tuned for additional torque output, while producing the same 162 hp of the 3.3L V6, produced 213 lb-ft of torque. The standard engine of the Chrysler Town & Country and all-wheel drive vans, the 3.8L engine became an option on the Grand Voyager/Grand Caravan. In January 1992 a 2.5-liter turbodiesel built by Italy's VM Motori was made available in Austrian-built Voyagers.

Initially deleted from the model line for 1991, the 5-speed manual transmission made a return for 1992 through 1994 on base-trim or cargo vans. The 2.5L engine was available with a 3-speed TorqueFlite automatic, along with the 3.0L V6. The 4-speed Ultradrive overdrive automatic transmission was fitted to both the 3.3L and 3.8L V6 engines. The Europe-only turbodiesel was only available with a five-speed manual transmission.

1991-1995 Chrysler AS-platform minivan powertrain
Engine	Configuration	Production	Output		Transmission
Engine	Configuration	Production	Horsepower	Torque	Transmission
Chrysler K	2.5 L (153 cu in) 8-valve SOHC I4	1991–1995	100 hp (75 kW)	135 lb⋅ft (183 N⋅m)	5-speed manual (2.5L only) 3-speed A413 automatic (TorqueFlite)
Mitsubishi 6G72	3.0 L (181.4 cu in) 24-valve SOHC V6	1991–1995	142 hp (106 kW)	173 lb⋅ft (235 N⋅m)	3-speed A670 automatic (TorqueFlite)
Chrysler EGA	3.3 L (201 cu in) 12-valve OHV V6	1991–1995	1991-1993: 150 hp (110 kW)1994–1995: 162 hp (121 kW)	1991–1993: 180 lb⋅ft (240 N⋅m) 1994–1995: 194 lb⋅ft (263 N⋅m)	4-speed A604 overdrive automatic (Ultradrive)
Chrysler EGH	3.8 L (231 cu in) 12-valve OHV V6	1994–1995	162 hp (121 kW)	213 lb⋅ft (289 N⋅m)	4-speed A604 overdrive automatic (Ultradrive)
VM Motori VM425 (export)	2.5 L (152.5 cu in) 8-valve OHV turbodiesel I4	1992–1995	118 PS (116 hp; 87 kW)	193 lb⋅ft (262 N⋅m)	5-speed manual

=== Body ===
In an extensive redesign, the second-generation minivans featured a major revision of the exterior, lowering the exterior coefficient of drag from 0.43 to 0.39. While the styling changes were largely evolutionary, the AS-platform vans shared only the front doors and sliding door with the first-generation S-platform vans.

==== Exterior ====
The exterior saw the most extensive changes to the front fascia, as the front fenders were redesigned. Along with a lower hoodline, a smaller, sleeker grille was used; composite headlamps made their return, wrapping into the fenders. In an effort to lessen rust and improve fit and finish, front and rear bumpers were redesigned, with wraparound plastic bumpers replacing steel and rubber-ended bumpers. For 1991, the exterior door handles were carried over from the 1984-1990 vans; for 1992, the door handles were replaced by a larger design, fitted flush with the body. In line with the front fascia, the rear of the vehicle underwent several major changes, centered around a redesigned rear liftgate. To improve aerodynamics, the edges were reshaped and rounded; the rear window was enlarged, introducing a center/third rear brake lamp (at the base of the rear window) and the rear windshield wiper was updated to feature intermittent modes.

For 1994, the exterior underwent a minor revision, distinguished by revisions to the front bumpers (dependent on trim) and side trim.

==== Interior ====
The AS-platform minivans underwent a complete redesign of the interior from the previous generation. To accommodate the introduction of a driver-side airbag, the dashboard was reconfigured; along with an all-new steering wheel, primary and secondary controls were relocated within closer reach of the driver. Dodge and Plymouth vans were offered with two different analog instrument panels; the Chrysler Town & Country was fitted with a digital instrument panel as standard equipment. As a first for the model line, a glovebox was added to the dashboard (the underseat storage drawer made its return).

For 1991, seating configurations were revised slightly from 1989 to 1990 production. Five-passenger seating remained available on base-trim vans, with seven-passenger seating becoming standard on all SE/LE-trim vans (regardless of wheelbase). In another change, all outboard seating positions were fitted with 3-point seatbelts (a change mandated by federal passive safety standards). The Chrysler Town & Country dropped its second-row bench seat in favor of second-row bucket seats (in line with other high-content minivans and luxury conversion vans). Marketed as "Quad Command" seats, the seven-passenger configuration was an option on higher-trim (LE and LX/ES) Dodge and Plymouth vans. For 1992, Chrysler introduced integrated child safety seats as an optional feature for vans with second-row bench seats; a first in the minivan segment, the feature was introduced (in various forms) by other manufacturers.

For 1994, the interior underwent a mid-cycle update. The dashboard again went a redesign, as Chrysler added a passenger-side airbag (a first for the minivan segment). Along with the relocation of the glovebox (replacing the previous passenger knee bolster), the dashboard adopted larger HVAC vents. In another change, the integrated child safety seats were modified, allowing for a recline position (closer to a standard carseat).

=== Marketing variations ===
From the first-generation minivans, Chrysler carried over the previous trim levels essentially unchanged (the Mini Ram Van was replaced by the Dodge Caravan C/V, although the nameplate continued to be used in the Netherlands). Although once a distinguishing feature of the Chrysler minivans in the 1980s, simulated woodgrain trim began to fall out of favor in the 1990s. In 1992, woodgrain became a delete option from the Chrysler Town & Country and removed entirely from the Dodge Caravan for 1994.

As part of the 1994 model revision, the liftgate badging was changed from a stamped silver-on-black badge to a smaller embossed silver font; this was the first change to badging since 1984. Chrysler Town & Country versions retained their script-style badging.

At one point, there were plans for Chrysler's nascent Eagle marque to market a variant of the AS platform minivan; test shots show that this unnamed Eagle minivan would've been fairly identical to the Voyager, excepting the grille (which instead was a Jeep-style grille with the "eagle head" emblem in the center). This model ultimately never made it to market; Eagle instead marketed the Eagle Summit Wagon (also sold by Dodge and Plymouth as the Colt Vista and by Mitsubishi as the Expo LRV) as a minivan alternative.

==== Chrysler Town & Country ====
As part of the introduction of the second-generation minivans, the Chrysler Town & Country became a permanent member of the minivan model range, intended as its flagship. Produced only in the long-wheelbase body configuration, the Town & Country was equipped with woodgrain trim, body-color mirrors, and alloy wheels; the Town & Country is the only version of this generation produced with a digital instrument panel. As with its Chrysler New Yorker and Imperial counterparts, the Town and Country was fitted with a crystal Pentastar hood ornament. Along with tufted leather interior trim, the Town & Country was fitted with "Quad Command" seating, replacing the second row bench seat with bucket seats matching those of the front row.

Although woodgrain trim had been associated with the Town & Country nameplate since the 1940s, in 1992 the feature became a delete option (replaced by a gold pinstripe and a Town & Country fender script) as the design began to fall out of favor with buyers. In 1993, for MY1994, Chrysler introduced a version of the Town & Country with a body-color grille alongside the woodgrain side trim.

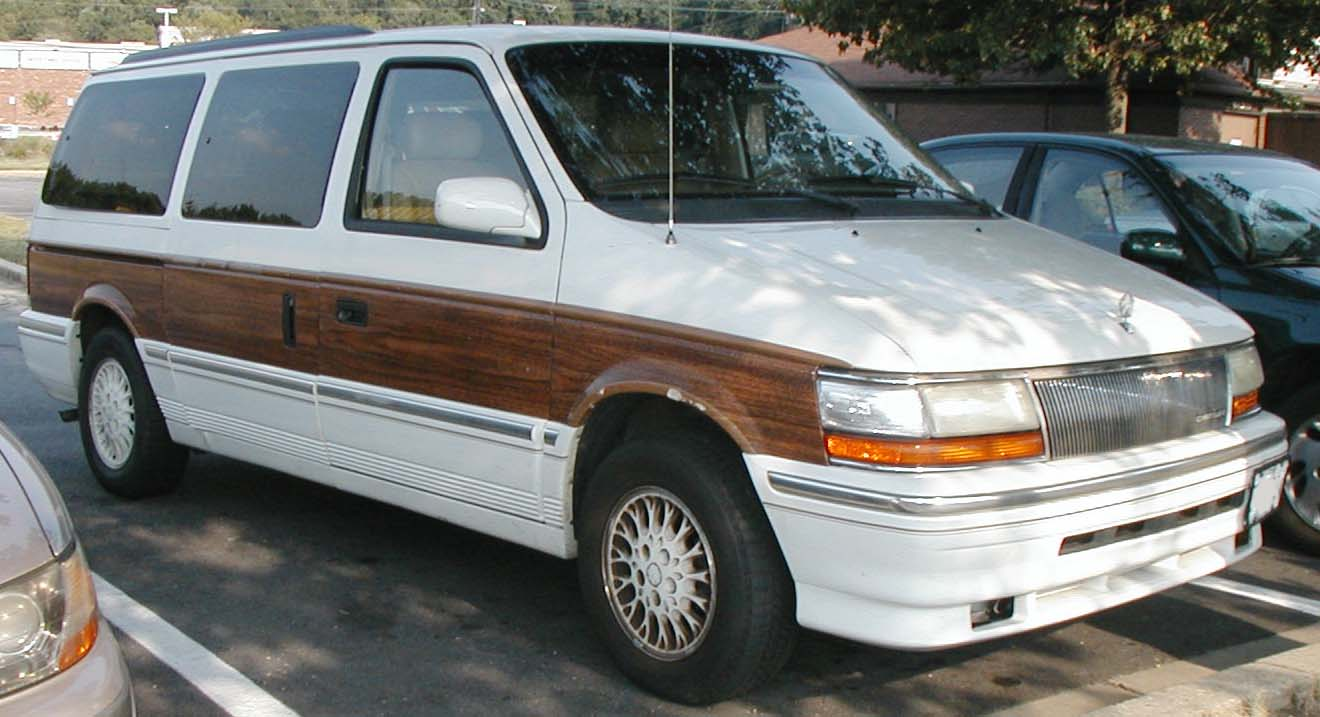
1993 Chrysler Town & Country

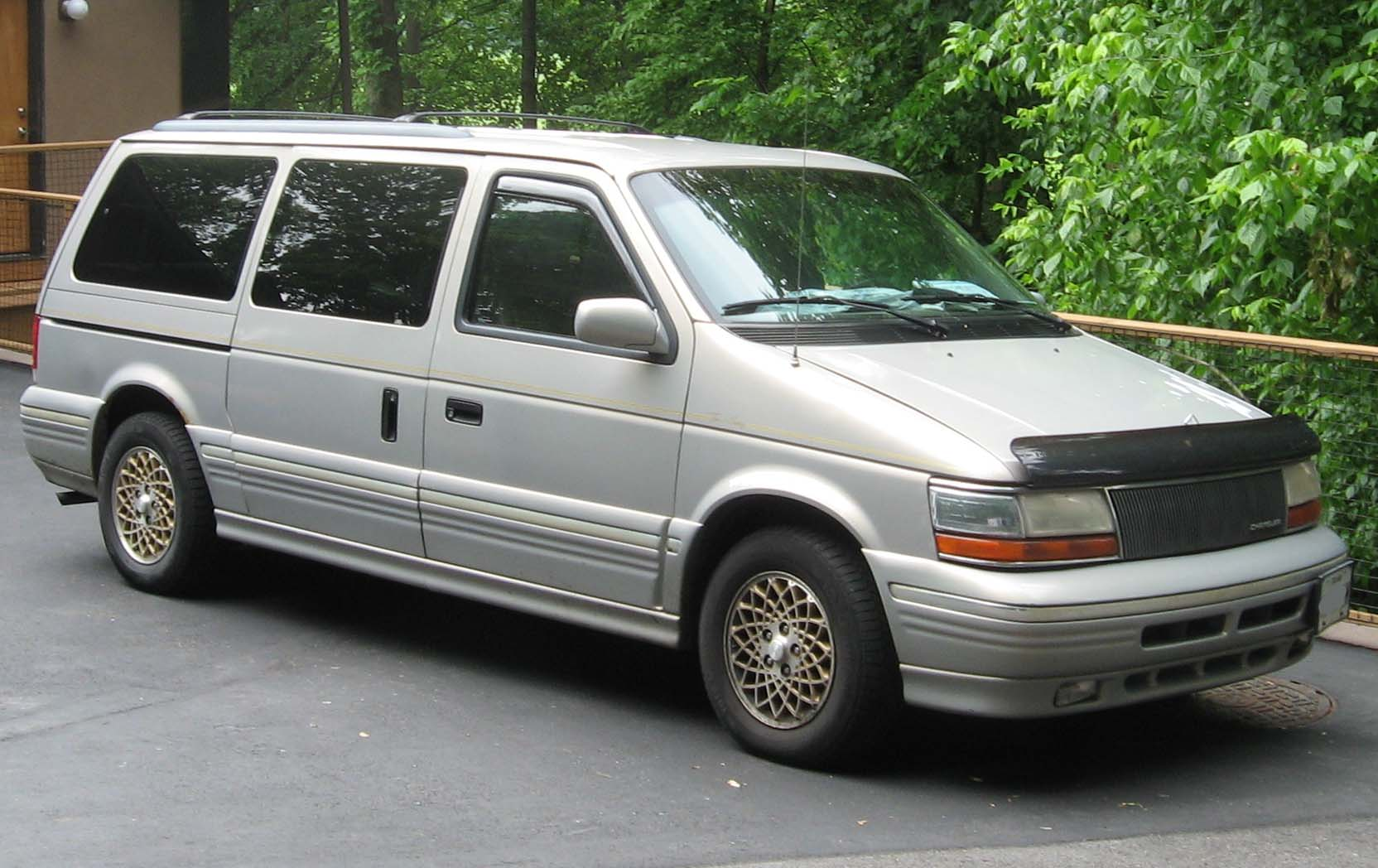
1994–1995 Chrysler Town & Country (woodgrain delete)

==== Chrysler Voyager (export) ====
Outside North America, as Chrysler does not own the rights to the Dodge or Plymouth brands, exports of the Chrysler minivans were done under the Chrysler nameplate. In Europe, Chrysler began sales of the Voyager in 1988. As with its first generation counterpart, the second-generation Chrysler Voyager is largely related to the Dodge Caravan in trim. Initially produced by St. Louis Assembly, in late 1991, Chrysler began sourcing the Voyager from Eurostar in Austria. In January 1992, the Chrysler Voyager began production with a 2.5L VM Motori diesel engine. The Chrysler minivans have never been sold with a diesel option in North America, however. On the AS platform, some voyagers could be found with Plymouth's “Eggcrate” grille.

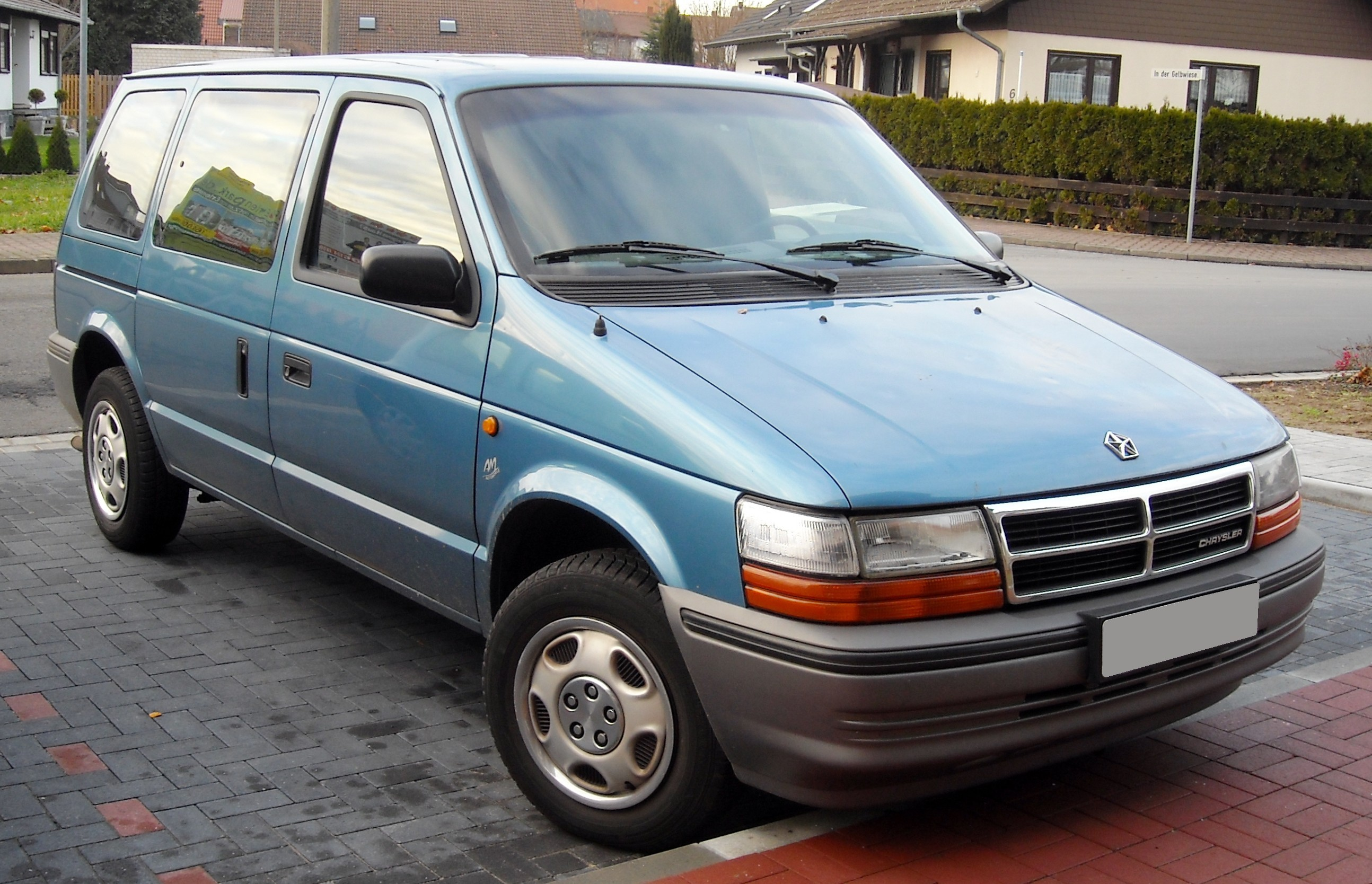
Chrysler Voyager SE (front)

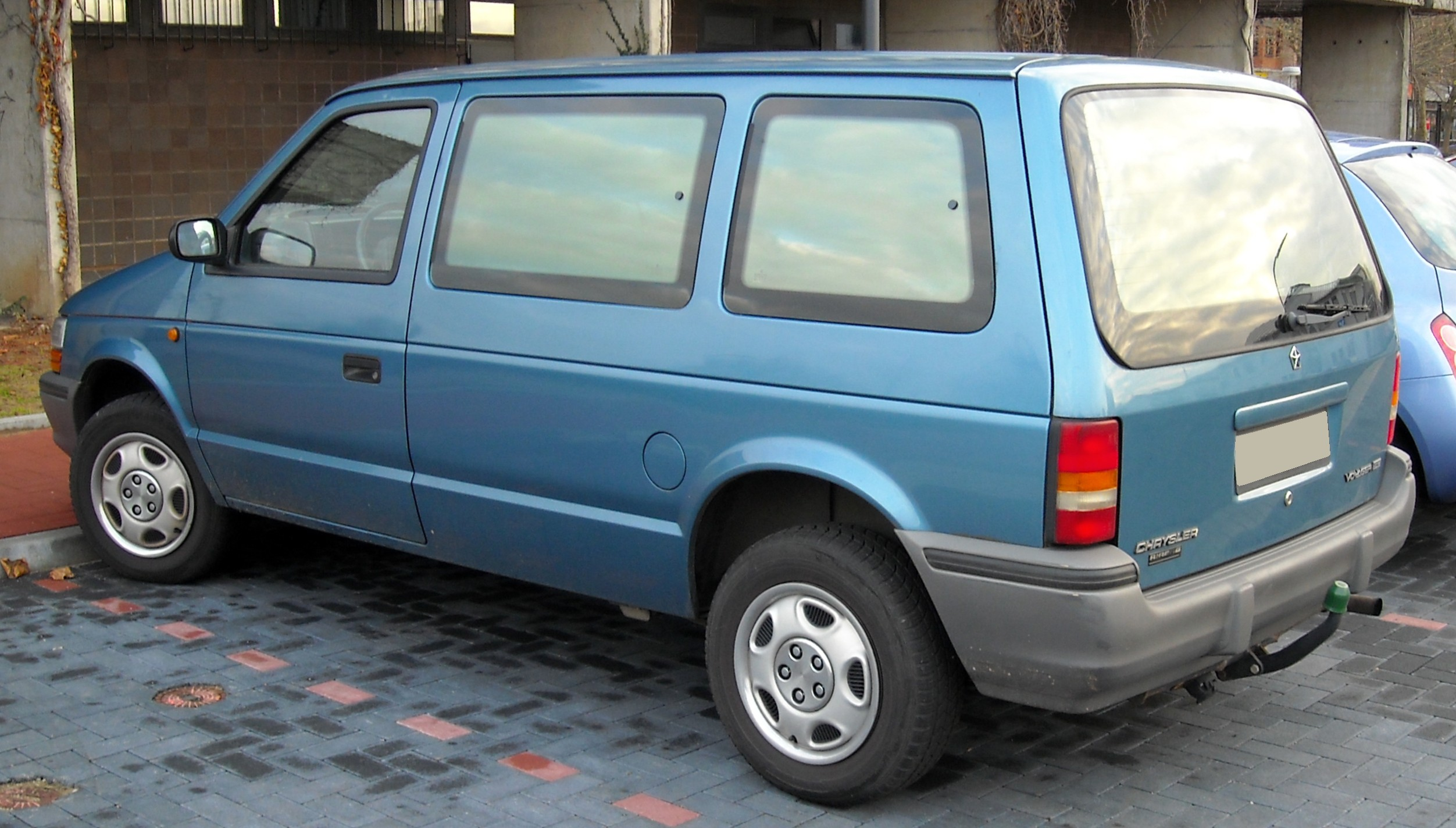
Chrysler Voyager SE (rear 3/4)

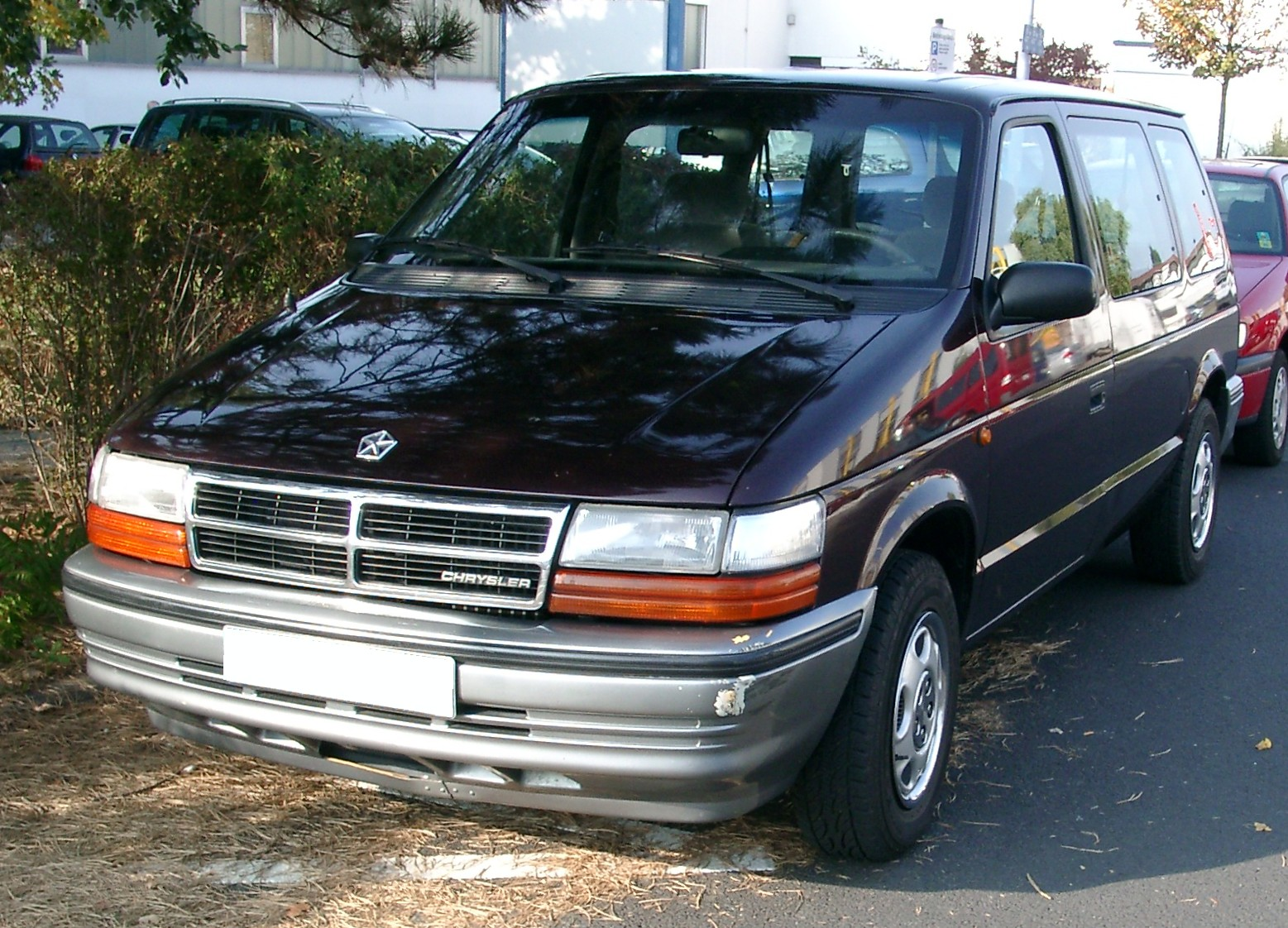
Chrysler Voyager (base trim)

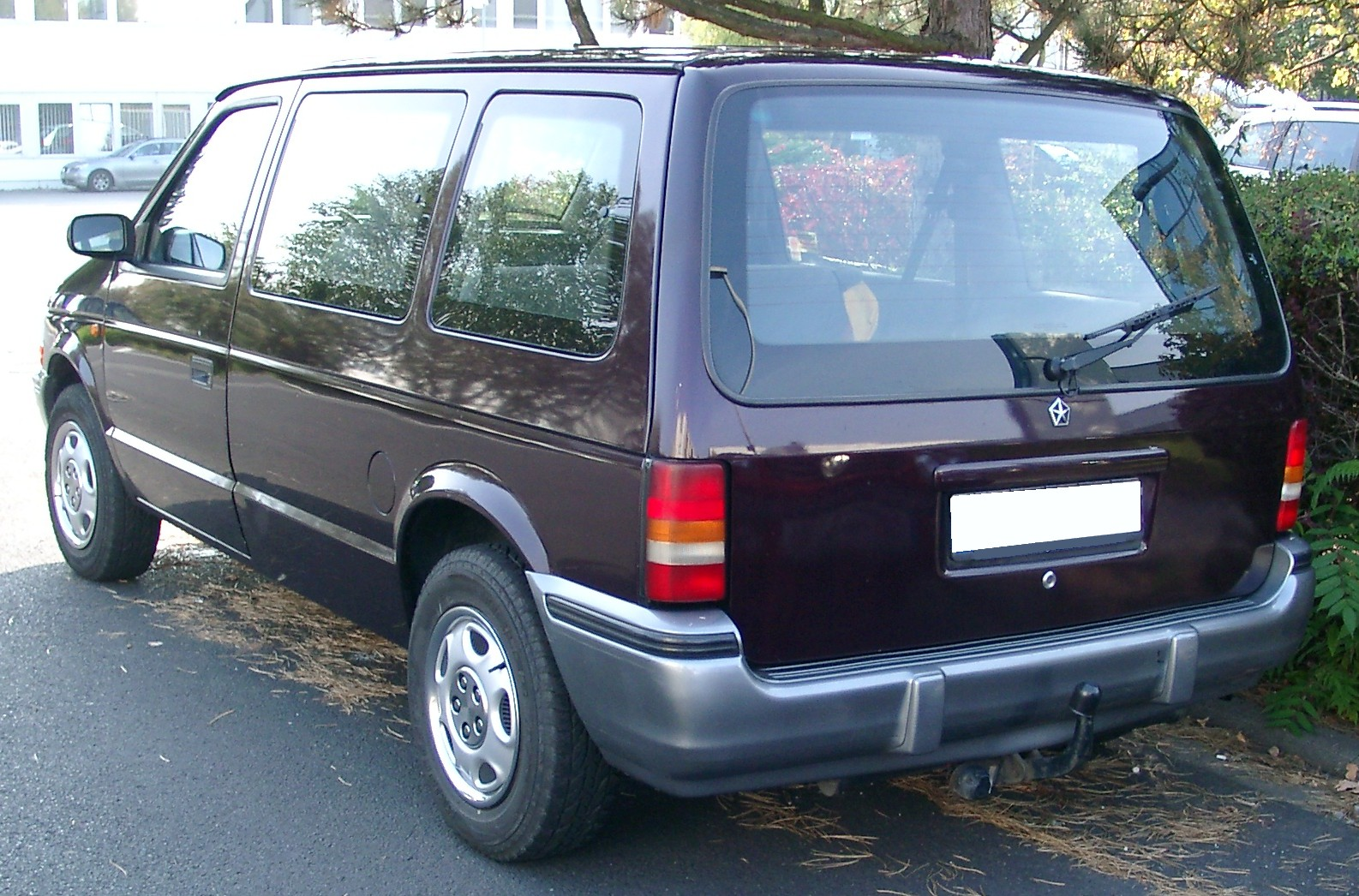
Chrysler Voyager (base trim)

==== Dodge Caravan and Plymouth Voyager ====
In a shift from the first generation, Chrysler stylists began to give the Dodge Caravan and Plymouth Voyager separate divisional identities. The Dodge Caravan adopted the Dodge "crosshair" grille as the Plymouth Voyager returned a restyled version of the Plymouth eggcrate grille. All Voyagers were styled with chrome-trim grilles; the Caravan was offered with either chrome or body-color grilles (dependent on trim). The Chrysler Town & Country shared its headlamps (and taillamps) with the Plymouth Voyager with a model-specific waterfall-style grille. With the exception of the Dodge (Grand) Caravan C/V cargo van (sold as the Mini Ram Van in the Netherlands), Dodge and Plymouth marketed the Caravan and Voyager identically across comparable trim levels. With the exception of the steering wheel, AS-platform Dodge and Plymouth minivans of equivalent trims share essentially the same interior; Dodge Caravans are fitted with a four-spoke steering wheel while Plymouth Voyagers use a two-spoke steering wheel.

Along with the base-trim 5-passenger vans, both divisions continued the mid-grade SE and deluxe-trim LE. LE-trim vans included many features available on SE-trim vans as options as standard, along with additional sound insulation; long-wheelbase ("Grand") vans and all-wheel drive models were equipped with 15-inch wheels. The top trim in the Caravan and the Voyager was the ES (for both versions of the Caravan) and the LX (for the short-wheelbase Voyager). Sharing its model features with LE-trim models included as standard equipment, the LX/ES trims served as a cosmetic upgrade similar to namesake trims in the Plymouth Acclaim and Dodge Spirit. In place of woodgrain trim, the LX was given color-keyed two-tone exterior; the ES was given nearly monochrome trim (as with the Dodge Spirit, ES-trim Caravans were fitted with white-painted wheels). In line with the European Chrysler Voyager, the Dodge Caravan ES was not fitted with a stand-up hood ornament (with a body-color Chrysler Pentastar affixed directly onto the hood).

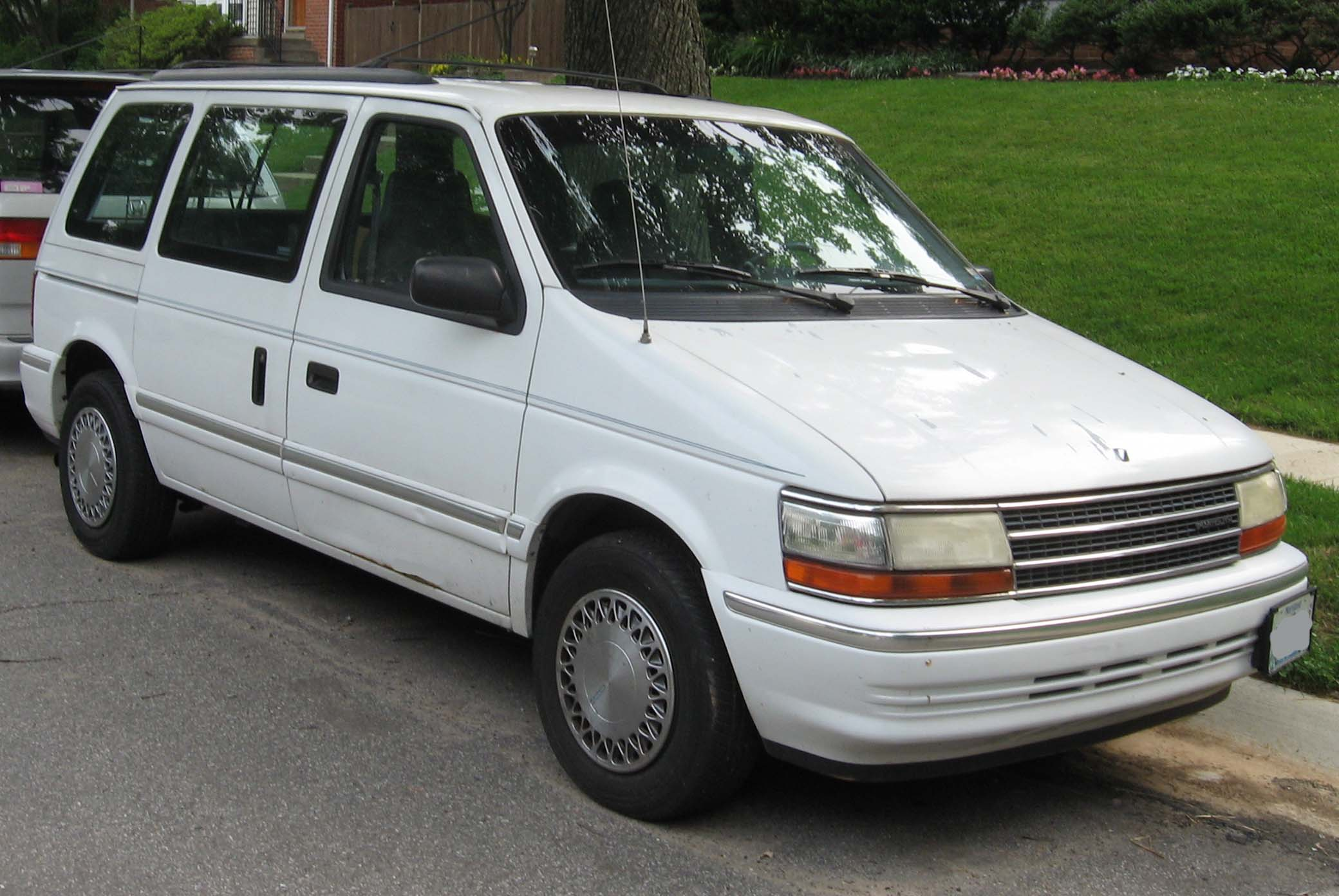
Plymouth Voyager SE

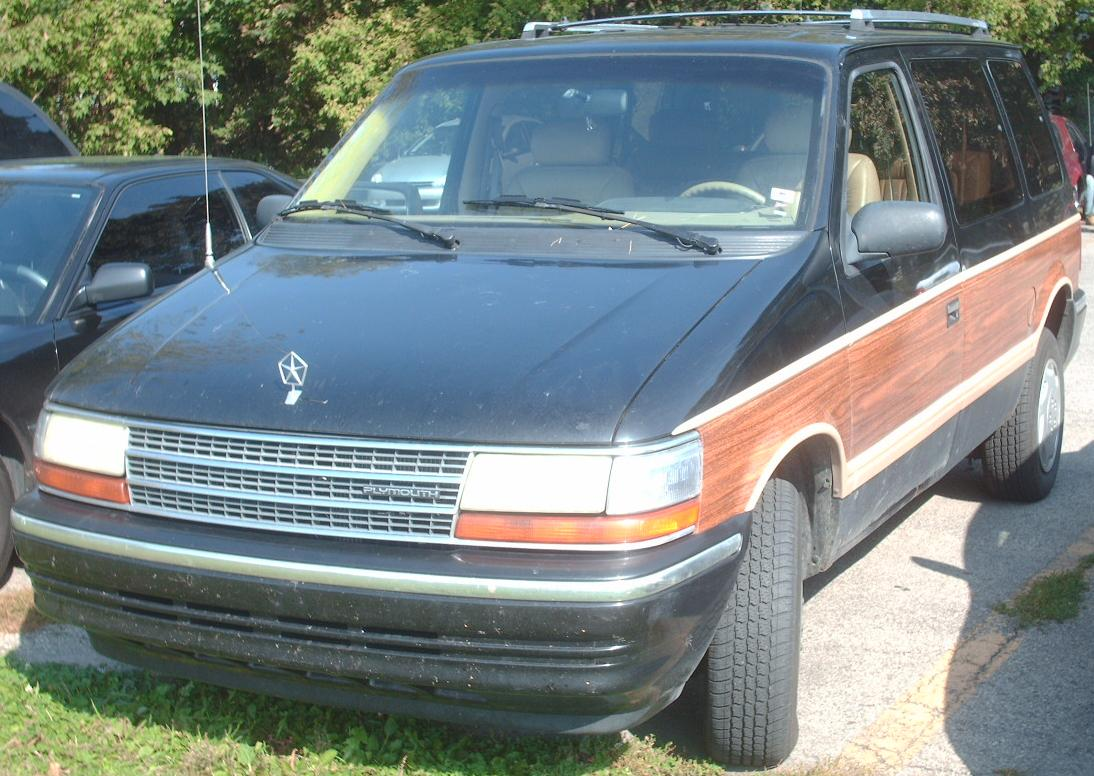
Plymouth Voyager LE

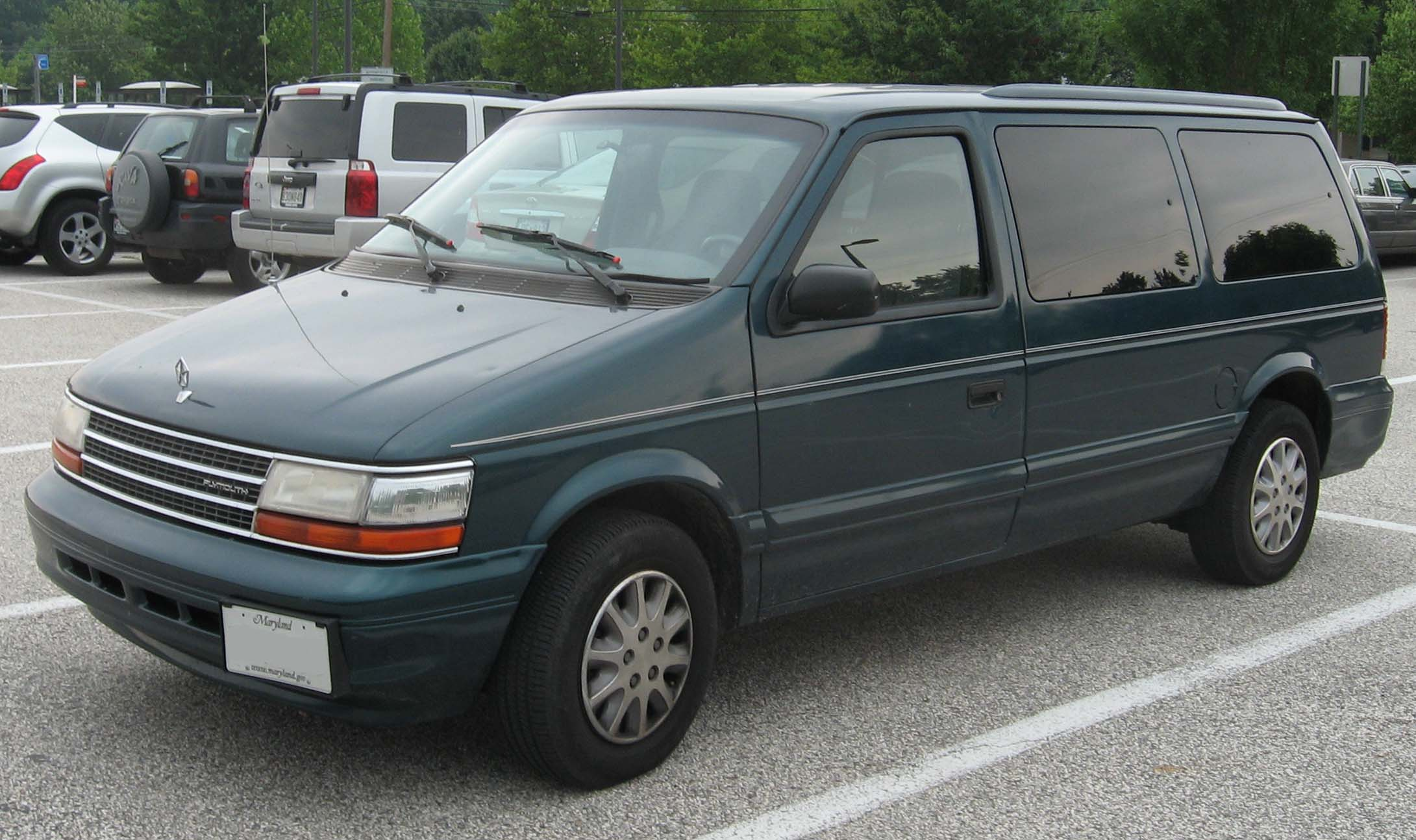
Plymouth Grand Voyager SE

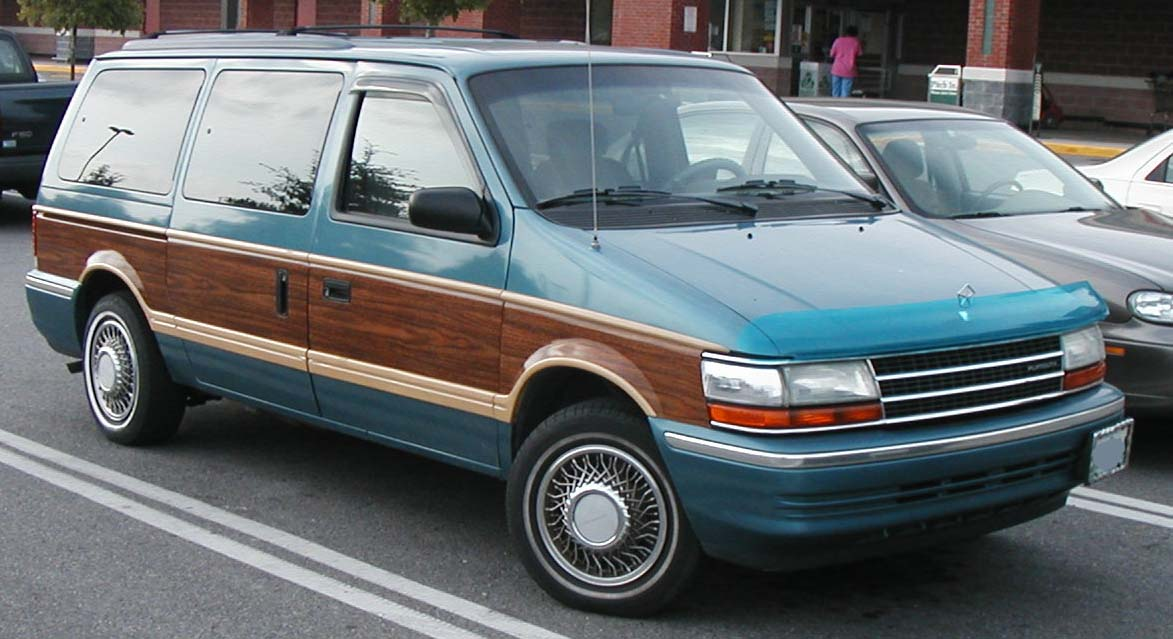
Plymouth Grand Voyager LE

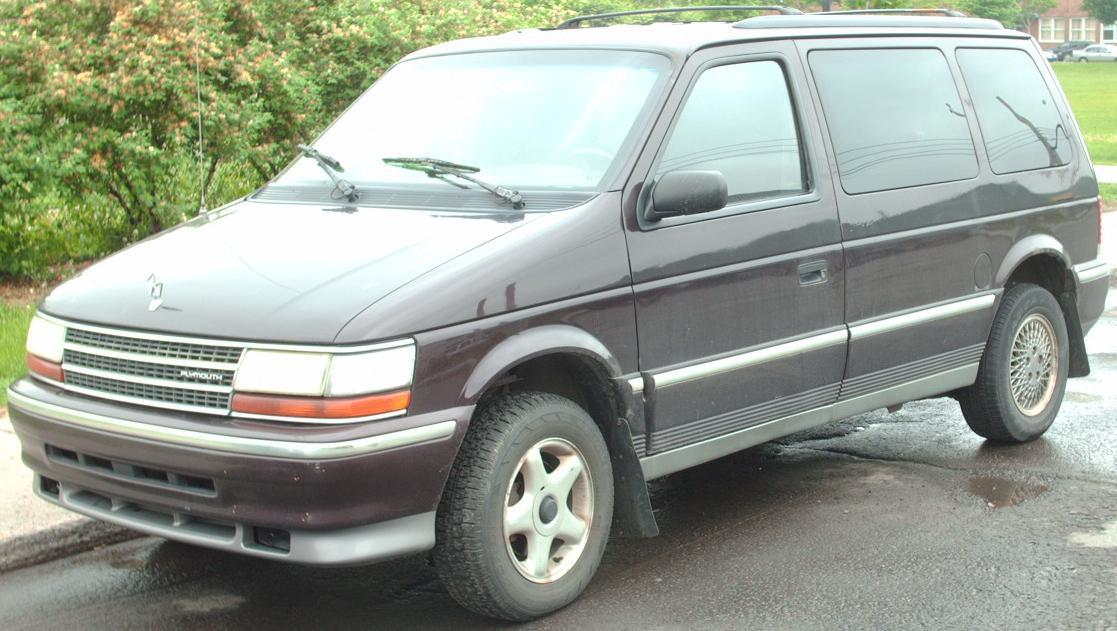
Plymouth Voyager LX (mismatched wheel rims)

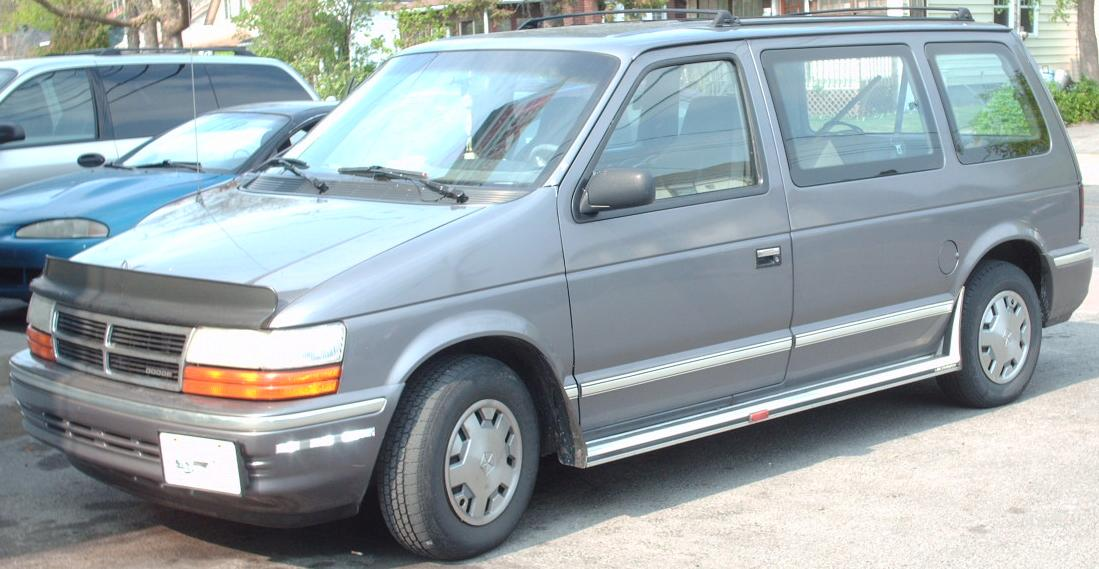
Dodge Caravan (base trim)

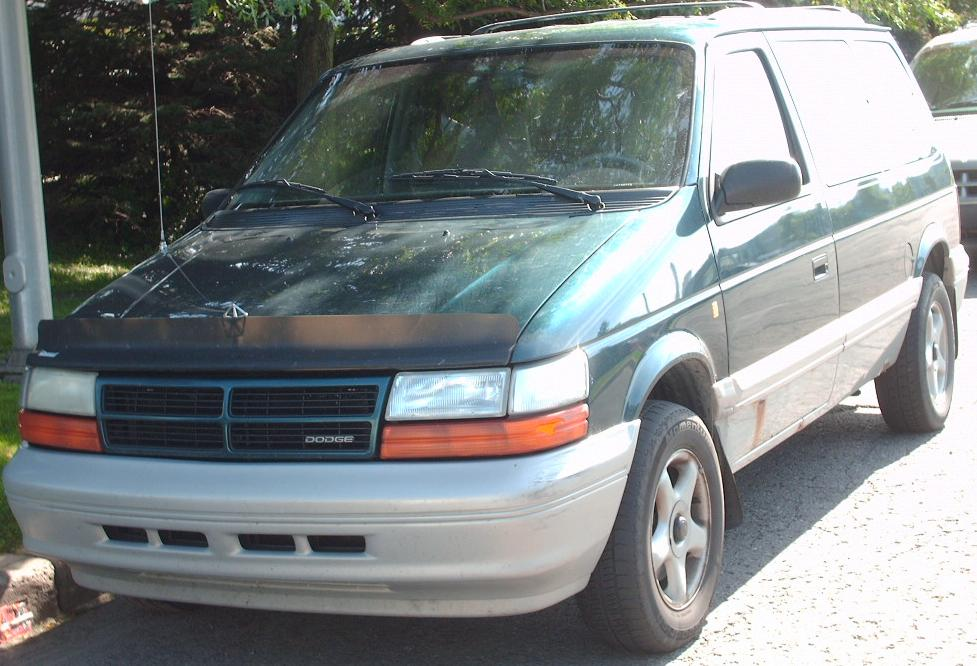
Dodge Caravan LE (10th Anniversary Edition)

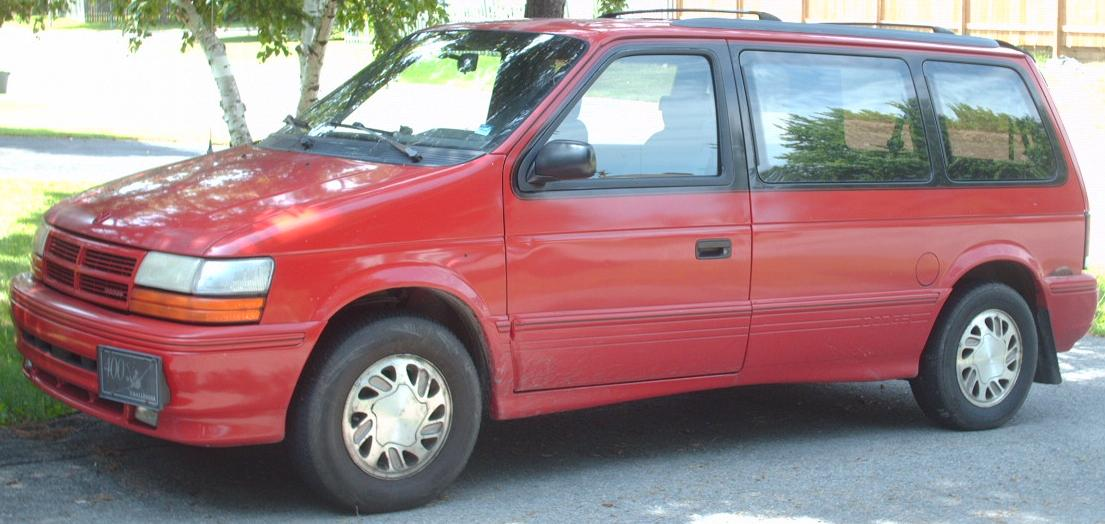
Dodge Caravan ES

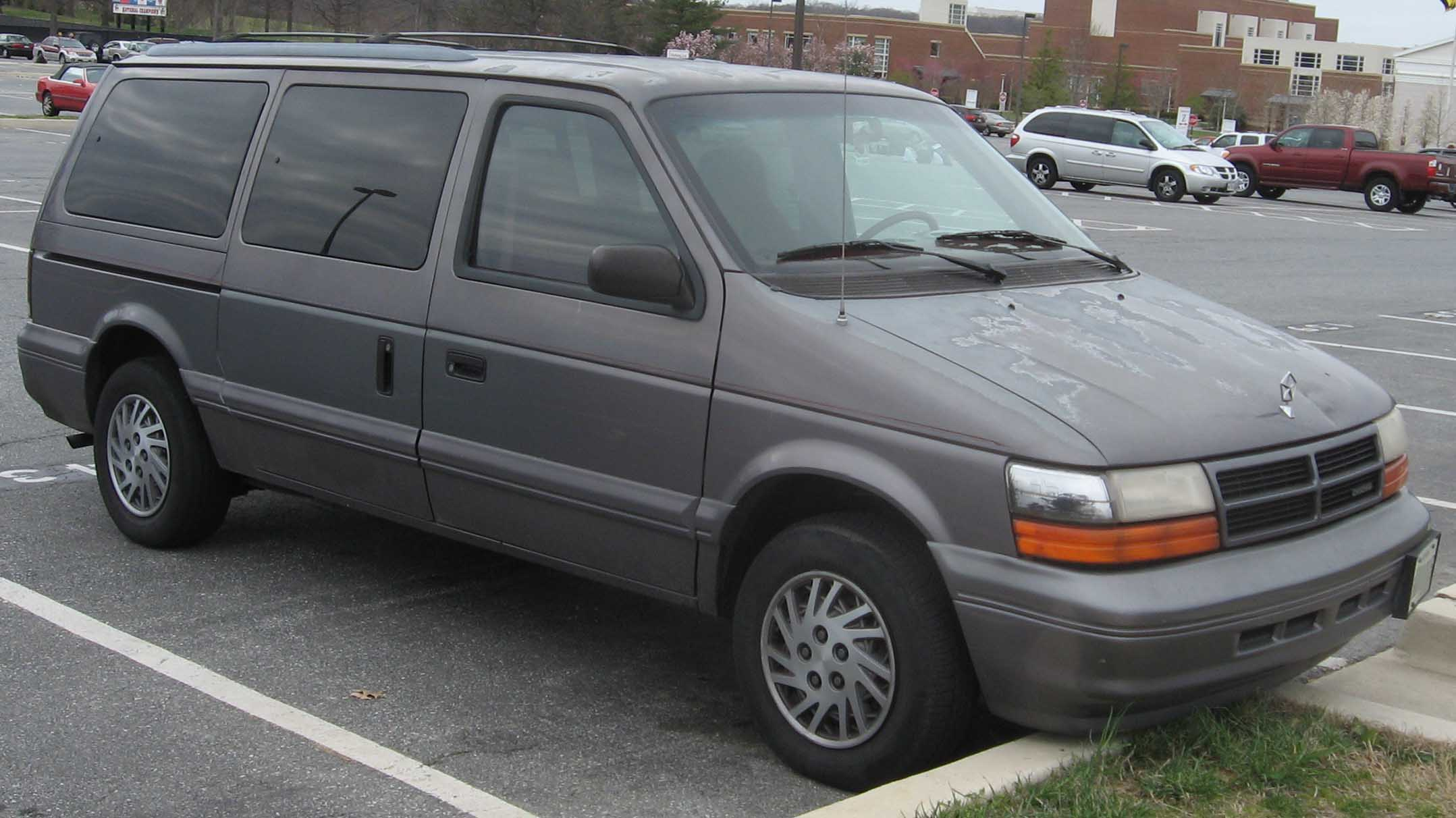
Dodge Grand Caravan SE

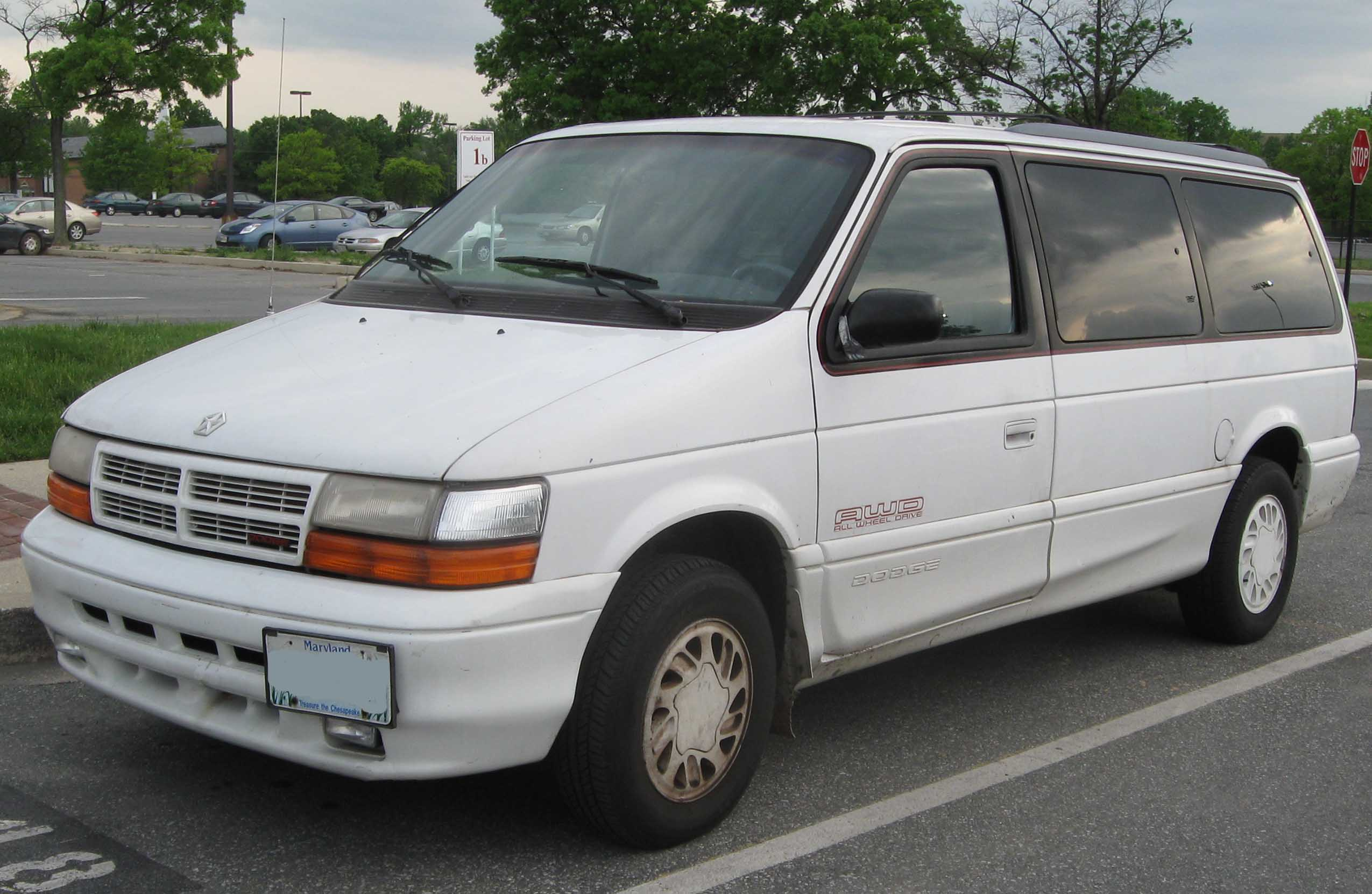
Dodge Grand Caravan ES (AWD)

== Alternative-fuel vehicles ==
=== CNG minivan (1994) ===
Following the production of CNG-fuel (compressed natural gas) van prototypes derived from the Dodge Ram Van in 1992, Chrysler began production of a CNG-fuel version of its minivan in 1994. Using the 3.3L V6 and 4-speed Ultradrive transmission powertrain, the CNG minivans underwent several modifications to accommodate the change in fuel. Along with modifications to the engine valvetrain, four 3000PSI CNG fuel tanks were added to the vehicle, taking the place of the spare tire well and gasoline tank, holding the energy equivalent of 8.5 gallons of gasoline.

=== Electric vehicles (1992–1995) ===
The Chrysler TEVan is a battery electric vehicle developed between Chrysler and the Electric Power Research Institute. First unveiled as a concept in 1992, an unknown number were produced between 1993 and 1995 (between 56 and 80). Deriving its name from the original T-115 codename for the Chrysler minivans and EV, the TEVan was sold nearly exclusively to fleet buyers; the vehicle was based on a standard-wheelbase five-passenger Dodge Caravan.

The TEVan used a 27 hp, 65 hp max (48 kW) Separately-Excited GE DC traction motor coupled to a two-speed FWD trans-axle that featured Hi, Lo, Reverse and Park. The owner's manual referred to it as a 'semi-automatic transmission' although it used a clutch. The motor controller was also manufactured by GE.

Two different battery types were available for the TEVan during its production; weighing in at 1,800 pounds (820 kg), the battery pack brought the curb weight the minivan to 5,060 lb (2,295 kg). The 180 V nickel-cadmium pack consisted of 30 SAFT STM5-180 6 V 180 Ah batteries in six removable pods under the floor of the car, delivering over 50 miles (80 km) of range, and used an automatic watering system for easy battery maintenance. The nickel-iron pack consisted of 30 Eagle-Pitcher 6 V 200 Ah batteries in six pods under the floor and delivered over 60 miles (97 km) of range. The TEVan owner's manual stated 80 miles (130 km) of range. The TEVan's on-board charger was a PFC Martin-Marietta and accepted 120 V AC@20 A or 40 A, 240 V AC@20 A or 40 A, and as high as 220 V AC@40 A three-phase inputs.

The TEVan had an 8.8 kW three-stage ceramic electric heater. The 120 A DC/DC converter provided all the 12 V power, there was no auxiliary (12 V) battery. Gauges included motor temperature and SOC (state of charge, akin to "Fuel Level") using the stock instruments. It was also equipped with electric air conditioning (R-134a), regenerative braking, power brakes using a Delco electric vacuum pump, power steering, AM/FM Stereo, and airbags. The original equipment tires were LRR, (Low Rolling Resistance), Goodyear P205/75R15 Momentum at 50 PSI.

As a successor, Chrysler would produce the 1997–1999 EPIC (Electric Powered Interurban Commuter Vehicle), based upon the third-generation minivans.
