= Chrysler minivans (NS) =

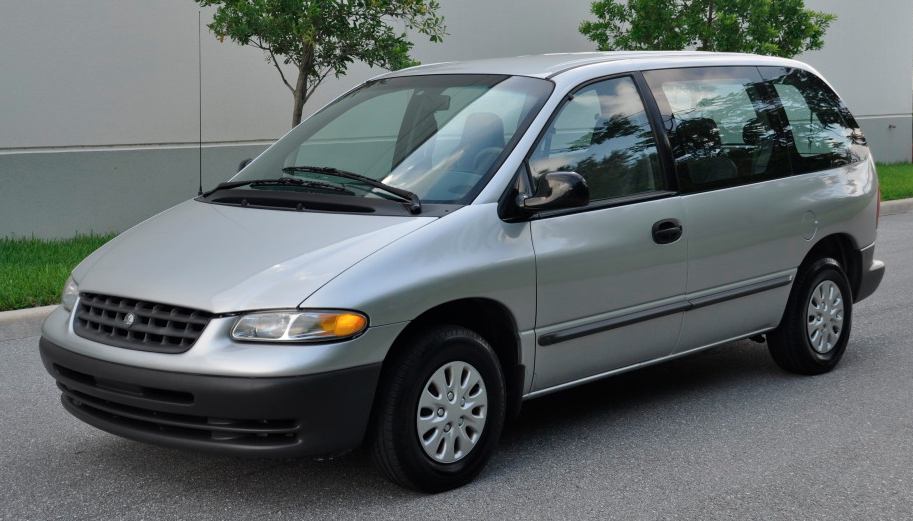
- 2000 Plymouth Voyager (no driver-side sliding door)

Overview
- Manufacturer: Chrysler Corporation (1996–1998); DaimlerChrysler (1998–2000)
- Also called: Dodge Caravan; Dodge Ram Van (Netherlands); Plymouth Voyager; Chrysler Voyager; Chrysler Town & Country; Dodge Grand Caravan (LWB); Plymouth Grand Voyager (LWB); Chrysler Grand Voyager (LWB); Chrysler Caravan; Chrysler Grand Caravan; 3-Star Grand Caravan (China)
- Production: January 30, 1995–2000; 1995–2002 (China)
- Model years: 1996–2000; 1996–2002 (China)
- Assembly: St. Louis, Missouri, United States; Windsor, Ontario, Canada; Graz, Austria (Eurostar); Zhanjiang, Guangdong, China (3-Star CKD)
- Designer: Don Renkert (1991)

Body and chassis
- Body style: 3-door and 4-door minivan
- Layout: Transverse front-engine, front-wheel drive / all-wheel drive
- Platform: Chrysler NS platform

Powertrain
- Engine: Gasoline: 2.0 L A588 SOHC I4; 2.0 L ECC DOHC I4; 2.4 L EDZ I4; 3.0 L 6G72 V6; 3.3 L EGA V6 (gasoline/E85); 3.8 L EGH V6; Diesel: 2.5 L VM425 TD I4
- Transmission: 5-speed manual (outside North America); 3-speed 31TH automatic 3-speed A670 automatic 4-speed 41TE automatic

Dimensions
- Wheelbase: SWB: 113.3 in (2,878 mm); LWB: 119.3 in (3,030 mm)
- Length: SWB: 186.3 in (4,732 mm); LWB FWD: 199.6 in (5,070 mm); LWB AWD: 199.7 in (5,072 mm)
- Width: 76.8 in (1,951 mm)
- Height: 68.5 in (1,740 mm); FWD: 68.7 in (1,745 mm)
- Curb weight: 3,528 lb (1,600 kg); 3,680 lb (1,669 kg) (Grand Caravan)

Chronology
- Predecessor: Chrysler minivans (AS)
- Successor: Chrysler minivans (RS)

The third-generation Chrysler minivans are a series of passenger minivans that were marketed by the Chrysler Corporation (later DaimlerChrysler) from the 1996 to 2000 model years. The first ground-up redesign of the model lines since their introduction, designers added a further degree of divisional identity between the Plymouth Voyager, Dodge Caravan, and Chrysler Town & Country. In a notable change, the cargo van was discontinued, with all examples sold as passenger vans. Coinciding with the retirement of the Plymouth brand during 2001, this is the final generation marketed as the Plymouth Voyager.

Designated the Chrysler NS platform, the third-generation minivans grew substantially in size, with standard-length vans becoming only 4 inches shorter in length than the previous "Grand" vans. Though following the introduction of the Ford Windstar by nearly exactly a year, the NS Chrysler minivans saw their form factor adopted nearly universally by the minivan segment in North America. In addition to its chief competitors Ford Windstar, Honda Odyssey, and Toyota Sienna, the model line configuration was adopted by the Chevrolet Venture, Oldsmobile Silhouette, and Pontiac (Trans Sport) Montana, and the Mercury Villager/Nissan Quest. Alongside its use of front-wheel drive and three-row seating, the NS vans introduced a driver-side sliding door (previously seen only in compact MPVs in North America).

In line with the first and second-generation minivans, the third-generation minivans were assembled at Windsor Assembly in Windsor, Ontario, Canada, with additional production sourced from Saint Louis (South) Assembly in Fenton, Missouri. To supplement exports from the United States, production of the Chrysler Voyager was sourced from Graz, Austria (in the Eurostar joint venture factory between Chrysler and Steyr-Daimler-Puch).

== Development ==
Development of the NS platform minivans commenced in 1990; with a team led by Tom Gale and Chris Theodore, design work (by Don Renkert) was approved in September 1991 with a design freeze in May 1992. In addition to becoming the first all-new Chrysler minivan in a decade, the third-generation vans were also a response to the development of a front-wheel drive replacement for the Ford Aerostar (unveiled in 1994 as the 1995 Ford Windstar).

While the S/AS-platform vans did not share direct structural underpinnings with the Chrysler K-Cars, in contrast to their predecessors, the NS vans were the first generation designed from the ground up as a minivan. They were of the first Chrysler vehicles designed with CATIA, which allowed for much tighter design tolerances.

In its effort to design the third-generation minivans, Chrysler benchmarked the vehicle from various sources of data, using customer input, warranty data, and research based on various other minivans (the Ford Aerostar, Mercury Villager, and Toyota Previa). During its market research, Chrysler sought owner feedback on adding a $300 driver-side sliding door option from minivan owners, with 85% of participants answering that they would buy the van with the second sliding door, even as an extra-cost option. Ironically, the feature had been planned for the first-generation minivans, but was removed in 1980 due to concerns over additional tooling costs.

Alongside a sliding door feature, several designs underwent consideration for the floor layout. Initially, a lower floor height was considered (research feedback felt that the step-in height was too high), but was rejected as it jeopardized the higher driving position sought by buyers. Chrysler approved a compromise between the two for final production, retaining the same floor height from the previous generation eased into lower door sills. In addition to preserving the higher driving position, the floor design allowed the fitment of all-wheel drive without major modification, larger wheels and tires, CNG tanks, and batteries for electric vehicles.

While the V6 powertrains of the previous-generation platform were retained, several configurations were under consideration for the final design. Initially, a mid-engine layout (in line with the Toyota Previa) was considered to improve the body structure, but was rejected for cost and complexity considerations. Adoption of a longitudinal powertrain (similar to the Chrysler LH cars) underwent strong consideration, as it improved V6 engine access and all-wheel drive systems; ultimately, the transverse powertrain was selected to reduce overall length.

In an extensive shift from the boxy design of the first two generations, the body adopted cab-forward design, shifting the dashboard and windshield forward. In contrast to the controversial styling of the GM APV minivans, the roof was moved upward (nearly 3 inches) and the cowl moved lower, allowing for a less radical windshield angle. To move the base of the windshield back several inches (to further improve visibility), Chrysler designed the windshield wiper module/lower windshield cowl to be removable (allowing for improved engine bay access).

In total, the development of the NS platform would cost Chrysler Corporation $2.8 billion (approximately $4.6 billion in 2017 dollars), the most costly vehicle ever developed by Chrysler at the time.

== Model overview ==
=== Chassis ===
The third-generation Chrysler minivans use the Chrysler NS platform designation. Using a completely new unibody chassis, the NS platform uses a 113.3 inch wheelbase for standard-wheelbase vans (1.3 inches longer) and a 119.3 inch wheelbase for long-wheelbase vans (same as 1994-1995 AS-platform vans). Front-wheel drive is the standard drivetrain configuration with all-wheel drive offered as an option.

The suspension of the NS platform is a modified version of the previous two generations. In front, the use of MacPherson struts continued, with leaf springs and a beam axle in the rear. During its development, a number of suspension configurations were considered, including a 4-wheel double wishbone layout. Rear leaf springs were retained largely in an effort to provide an ideal handling balance with a load in addition to maximize interior load space.

In a major modification, the front track width was widened three inches, allowing for lower mounting of the engine and transaxle, reduction in turning radius, and a lower cowl height.

Front-wheel drive vans had front-wheel disc brakes and rear drum brakes. From 1997, all-wheel drive vans were fitted with four-wheel disc brakes.

==== Powertrains ====
For 1996, the Chrysler minivans received the first new four-cylinder engine in the powertrain line since 1987, with the introduction of a 2.4L engine (shared with the JA-platform cars). While smaller in displacement than its 2.5L predecessor, the 150 hp engine nearly matched the 3.0L V6 in both output and fuel economy.

In states that did not observe California emission standards, the Mitsubishi 3.0L V6 was the standard V6 option. In those that followed California emissions standards, the Chrysler 3.3L V6 was the standard V6 option. In the Dodge Caravan ES and Chrysler Town & Country LXi, the 3.8L V6 was standard.

In 1999, the 3.8L V6 became optional on the Plymouth Voyager Expresso; in Canada, the 2.4L engine was dropped, with the 3.0L V6 becoming the standard engine.

In the United States and Canada, a manual transmission was no longer available, with a 3-speed TorqueFlite automatic fitted to the 2.4L and 3.0L engines. The 3.3L and 3.8L engines were fitted with a 4-speed Ultradrive automatic.

For the first time, export vehicles were fitted with different powertrains, with the standard engine being a SOHC 2.0L engine with an optional DOHC 2.0L engine (from the Neon); a VM Motori 2.5L diesel inline-4 continued to be offered. All three engines were offered with either a 5-speed manual or an automatic transmission. In addition to the four-cylinder engines, export vehicles were offered the 3.3L and 3.8L V6 engines offered in American-market minivans. AWD models were not sold in the United Kingdom.

1996-2000 Chrysler NS-platform powertrain
Engine	Configuration	Production	Output	Transmission
Chrysler ECB (export)	2.0 L (122 cu in) SOHC 16V inline-4	1996-2000	132 hp (98 kW)130 lb⋅ft (180 N⋅m)	5-speed manual 3-speed TorqueFlite (31TH) automatic
Chrysler ECC (export)	2.0 L (122 cu in) DOHC 16V inline-4	1996-2000	150 hp (110 kW)133 lb⋅ft (180 N⋅m)	5-speed manual 3-speed TorqueFlite (31TH) automatic
Chrysler EDZ	2.4 L (144 cu in) DOHC 16V inline-4	1996-2000	150 hp (110 kW)167 lb⋅ft (226 N⋅m)	5-speed manual 3-speed TorqueFlite (31TH) automatic
VM Motori VM425 (export)	2.5 L (152.5 cu in) OHV inline-4 turbodiesel, indirect injection	1996-2000	118 PS (116 hp; 87 kW)262 N⋅m (193 lb⋅ft)	5-speed manual 3-speed TorqueFlite (31TH) automatic
Mitsubishi 6G72 (non-CA emissions)	3.0 L (181 cu in) SOHC 12V V6	1996-2000	150 hp (110 kW)176 lb⋅ft (239 N⋅m)	3-speed TorqueFlite (A670) automatic
Chrysler EGA	3.3 L (202 cu in) OHV V6	1996-2000	158 hp (118 kW)203 lb⋅ft (275 N⋅m)	4-speed Ultradrive (41TE/41AE) automatic
Chrysler EGH	3.8 L (231 cu in) OHV V6	1996–1997	166 hp (124 kW)227 lb⋅ft (308 N⋅m)	4-speed Ultradrive (41TE/41AE) automatic
Chrysler EGH	3.8 L (231 cu in) OHV V6	1998-2000	180 hp (130 kW)240 lb⋅ft (330 N⋅m)	4-speed Ultradrive (41TE/41AE) automatic

=== Body ===
In an extensive shift from the second-generation minivans, the NS-platform minivans abandoned the boxy body design of the previous two Chrysler minivan generations. While (on average) three inches taller than their predecessors, the new design lowered the exterior coefficient of drag from 0.39 to 0.35 (matching the Ford Windstar, bested only by the GM APV minivans). In the redesign, no body panels were carried over, with all three brands adopting new model badging.

A central feature of the redesign (later becoming a standard feature on some trim levels) was the driver-side sliding door. While first used on compact minivans, including the Nissan Stanza Wagon and Nissan Axxess, the NS-platform minivans were the first mid-size minivans to adapt the feature. Though again using a 3-track mounting system for the sliding doors, the system was redesigned to consume less interior space; the exterior door track was hidden below the side windows. In addition to its styling, the function of the liftgate was changed for the first time, with an exterior handle available for the first time, eliminating the pop-and-lift maneuver of the two previous generations (adapted from the K-car station wagon). The exterior door handles were redesigned, switching from a flip-up design to a pull-out design.

Alongside the exterior, major changes were made to the interior of the NS-platform minivans. Again offered with 7 passenger seating, the latching system for the 2nd and 3rd row seats was redesigned; in a single motion, owners could release 2nd and 3rd-row bench seats by floor latch, raising them onto rollers to move them out of the vehicle (the lighter 2nd-row bucket seats did not have them). For the first time, the seatbacks of front bucket seats folded forward. The mounting positions for the third-row seat were moved inboard, matching the second row, eliminating a separate set of seat mounts on the floor.

While styled far differently from its 1995 predecessor, the dashboard of the NS-platform minivans adopted a similar layout to the second-generation minivans. For the first time since 1988, each Chrysler minivan shared the same steering wheel (among the only Chrysler Pentastars visible to the driver). While the glovebox was enlarged, the underseat storage drawer made its return as an option for vans with manual passenger seats. For vans with power-adjusted passenger seats, a locking storage compartment mounted to the side of the seat was offered in lieu of the drawer as a result of the power adjustment mechanism. As a first for minivans, the NS minivans introduced dual-zone climate control (as an option) and adjustable cupholders.

=== Safety ===
The 1996–2000 Dodge Grand Caravan received a "Marginal" rating in the Insurance Institute for Highway Safety's 40 mph offset test. The structural performance and restraints were graded "Acceptable", but the foot injuries were very high.

In the NHTSA crash tests, it received 4 stars for the driver and front passenger in the frontal-impact. In the side-impact test, it received 5 stars for the driver, and 3 stars for the rear occupant, and resulted in a fuel leak that could cause a fire hazard.

According to EuroNCAP crash test results, the 1999 model Chrysler Voyager did so badly in the frontal impact that it earned no points, making it the worst of the group. The body structure became unstable and the steering column was driven back into the driver's chest and head'. The 2007 model Chrysler Voyager fared little better, achieving just 19% in the frontal impact test, with an overall score of 2 stars out of a possible 5. However, chest compression measurements on the test dummy 'indicated an unacceptably high risk of serious or fatal injury. As a result, the final star in the adult occupant rating is struck-through'.

Despite the bad results in the EuroNCAP crash tests, statistics from the real world indicate that this is not the whole picture. Folksam is a Swedish insurance company that in May 2009 published a report on injuries and survivability of 172 car models. The 1988–96 generation got a real world rating of "Average", and the 1996-2000 generation got a rating called "Safest" (at least 30% safer than the average car.)

== Marketing variations ==
Introduced in March 1995 for the 1996 model year, the third-generation Chrysler minivans were marketed by the Chrysler, Dodge, and Plymouth divisions, with the return of the Plymouth Voyager, Dodge Caravan, and Chrysler Town & Country. In a change from the previous two generations, to better distinguish its three divisions, the Plymouth Voyager was marketed as an entry-level minivan, with the Dodge Caravan slotted between the Voyager and the Chrysler Town & Country.

As before, the Voyager and Caravan were produced in standard and extended-length (Grand) configurations, with the Town & Country introducing a standard-length configuration for the first time. For the first time, all Chrysler minivans were passenger vans, as the Dodge Caravan C/V cargo van was discontinued.

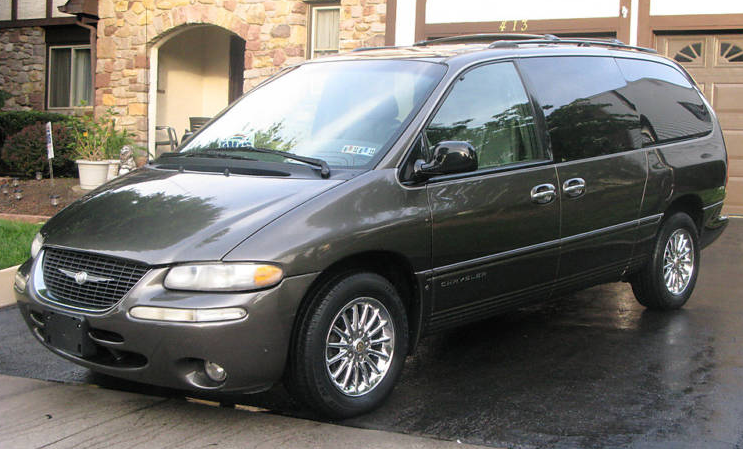
2000 Chrysler Town & Country Limited

=== Chrysler Town & Country ===
Again positioned as the flagship of the Chrysler minivans, the third-generation Chrysler Town & Country underwent an extensive revision of its model range. For the first time, a short-wheelbase body was offered, along with multiple trim levels. As part of the redesign, the model line saw its long-running simulated woodgrain trim (dating to 1965) deleted in favor of body color moldings with chrome exterior trim. In another change, the Chrysler crystal Pentastar hood ornament was replaced by a medallion-style Chrysler grille badge.

Replacing the LE-trim Voyager/Grand Voyager (in the United States), the base trim was LX (short-wheelbase, SX for 1997–1999) with LXi serving as the top-level trim. In 1997, the driver-side sliding door became standard on the Town & Country (1996 examples produced without one are very rare).

For 1998, the Town & Country underwent a mid-cycle revision to further differentiate it from its Dodge and Plymouth counterparts, centered around the introduction of a redesigned grille (introducing a "winged" Chrysler badge) and an updated interior. Above the LXi, the Town & Country Limited made its debut. For 2000, the short-wheelbase body was discontinued, ending the SX trim.

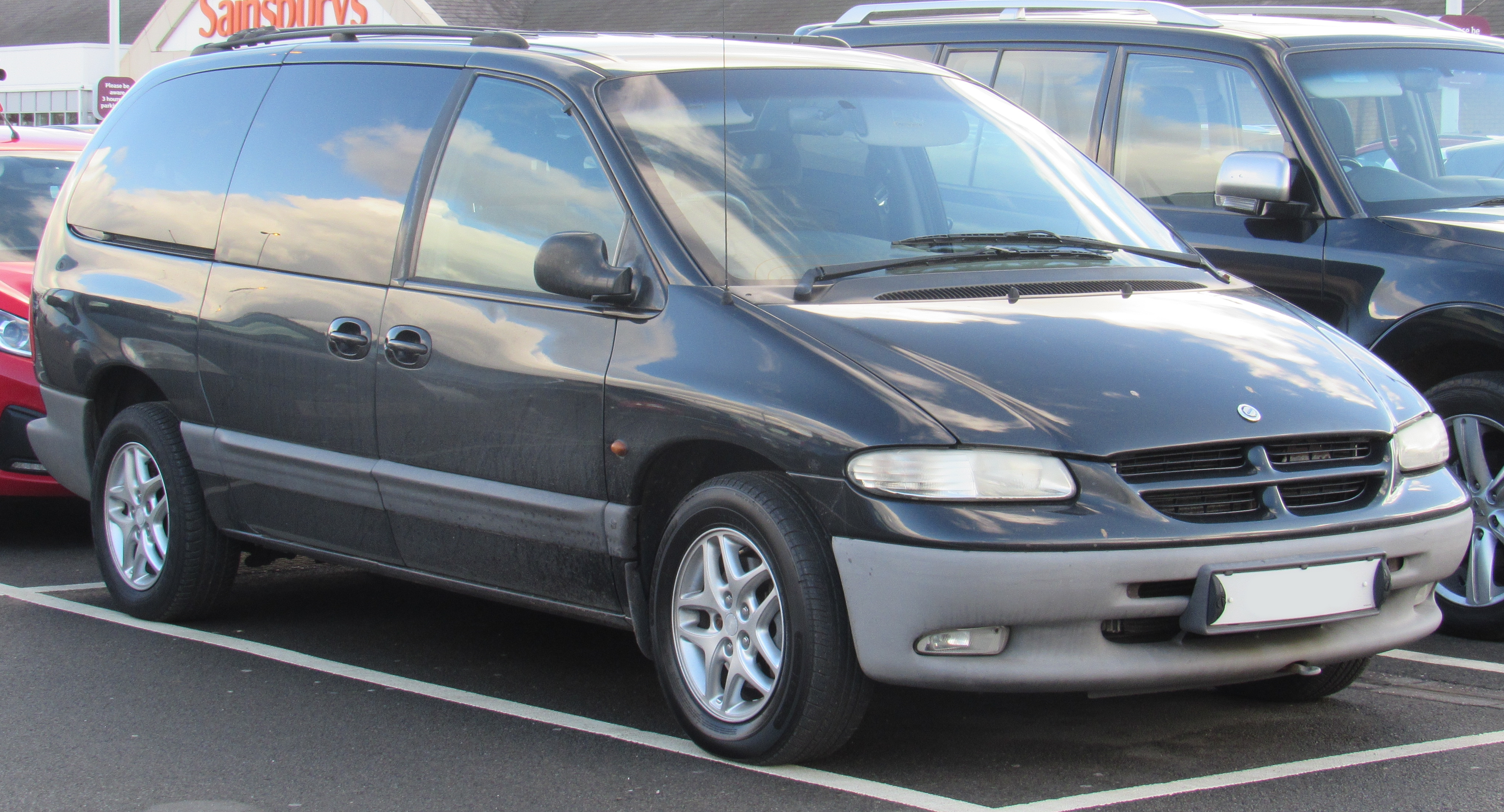
2001 Chrysler Grand Voyager LE (RHD)

=== Chrysler Voyager (export) ===
Outside the United States and Canada, Chrysler exported the third-generation minivans to a number of global markets under the Chrysler (Grand) Voyager nameplate. Using the body and interior of the Dodge Caravan, the Voyager was produced by Saint Louis Assembly in Fenton, Missouri and by Eurostar in Graz, Austria. These export models received the platform designation GS. Despite being discontinued for most markets, a commercial version continued to be offered in the Netherlands under the Dodge Ram Van nameplate. Specific Chrysler Voyagers (SE Trim only (1996–1997) could be bought with Plymouth's "Eggcrate" grille.

For the first time, the Voyager was produced in right-hand drive, allowing wide sales in Australia and the United Kingdom. Sharing its V6 engines with its domestic counterpart, the Voyager was also offered with a 2.0L inline-4 (from the Neon, in place of the 2.4L engine), and a 2.5L diesel inline-4. Along with automatic transmissions, a 5-speed manual transmission was offered (the only third-generation Chrysler minivan produced with a manual transmission).

In some Asian and Latin American markets, GS minivans were offered under the Chrysler (Grand) Caravan nameplate.

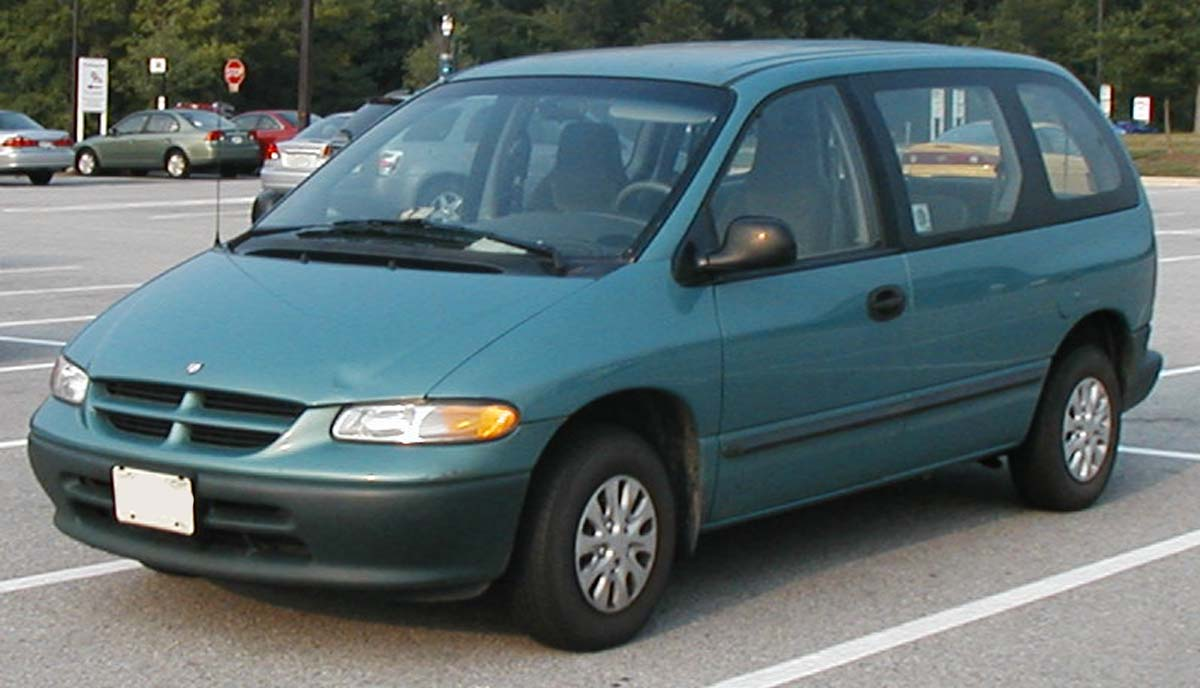
1996 Dodge Caravan (no driver-side sliding door)

=== Dodge Caravan ===
In a break from its predecessors, the third-generation Dodge Caravan was marketed distinctly from the Plymouth Voyager, becoming the mid-range model of the Chrysler minivan product line. The Caravan C/V cargo van was discontinued, with all examples serving as passenger vans. In place of the Pentastar, Chrysler adopted the Dodge "Ram" hood emblem; the Caravan is the only NS minivan with a hood-mounted emblem.

As with its predecessor, the Caravan and Grand Caravan used base, SE, LE, and ES trims. Base and SE/LE trims were fitted with gray bumpers with gray moldings; ES trims (and Sport-package versions) featured body-colored trim. Seven-passenger seating was standard, regardless of body length. For 1999, the driver-side sliding door became offered as an option on all versions of the Caravan.

For 1999, the Dodge Caravan ES was equipped with an Autostick gear selector for its automatic transmission, a first for a minivan. As the Caravan is designed with a column-mounted automatic transmission shifter, Autostick is operated via a momentary switch on the gear selector.

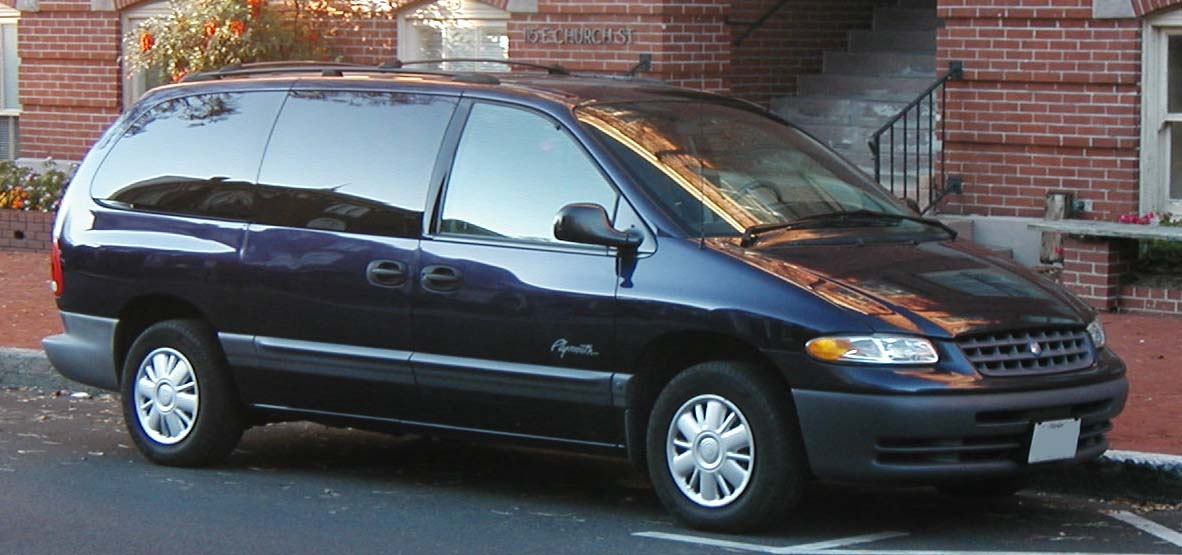
Plymouth Grand Voyager SE

=== Plymouth Voyager ===
In a shift from previous minivans, the third-generation Voyager was marketed as the entry-level Chrysler minivan rather than as a direct counterpart of the Dodge Caravan. While sharing the same bodyshell, the Voyager and Caravan saw significant changes in body trim and feature content. Distinguished by a dark gray eggcrate grille (a body-color grille became an option in 1998), the Voyager used matte gray bumpers across all trim levels with matte gray side moldings (fog lights were not available as an option). Before calendar 1996, the NS Voyager was produced with the Pentastar, shifting to the "sailboat" Plymouth grille emblem afterward.

The Voyager retained the base, SE, and LE trims from its predecessor. To reduce model overlap, the LE trim was discontinued in the United States (in favor of an expanded Town & Country range). To allow the Plymouth brand to remain competitive, the Rallye option package was introduced on the SE trim; along with exterior badging, the Rallye offered interior content featured in LE-trim Voyagers and Caravans. For 1998, the Rallye trim was renamed Expresso.

For 2000, as Chrysler withdrew the Plymouth brand, the Voyager was marketed by both Chrysler and Plymouth.

== Easy Out Roller Seats ==
In 1996, Chrysler introduced a system of seats to facilitate installation, removal, and re-positioning. Marketed as Easy-Out Roller Seats, the system remained in use throughout the NS generation.

When installed, the seats are latched to floor-mounted strikers. When unlatched, eight rollers lift each seat, allowing it to be rolled fore and aft. Tracks have locator depressions for rollers, thus enabling simple installation. Ergonomic levers at the seatbacks release the floor latches single-handedly without tools and raise the seats onto the rollers in a single motion. Additionally, seatbacks were designed to fold forward. Seat roller tracks are permanently attached to the floor and seat stanchions are aligned, facilitating the longitudinal rolling of the seats. Bench seat stanchions were moved inboard to reduce bending stress in the seat frames, allowing them to be lighter. When configured as two- and three-person benches, the Easy Out Roller Seats could be unwieldy.

In subsequent generations of the Chrysler minivans, beginning in 2001, second and third-row seats became available in a 'quad' configuration – bucket or captain chairs in the second row and a third-row three-person 50/50 split "bench" — with each section weighing under 50 lb (23 kg).

== Alternative-fuel vehicles ==
In 1999, Dodge introduced the Caravan EPIC, a fully electric minivan. The EPIC was powered by 28 12-volt NiMH batteries and was capable of traveling up to 80 miles (130 km) on a single charge. The EPIC was sold as a fleet-only lease vehicle. Production of the EPIC was discontinued in 2001. Only a few hundred of these vehicles were produced and sold. After the leases expired they were returned and crushed. Approximately 10 vans remain in private hands today.

== Concept vehicles ==
In 1999, coinciding with the 15th anniversary of Chrysler minivan production, Chrysler unveiled three concept minivans, largely intended to further advance the divisional styling and design of each vehicle.

=== Chrysler Pacifica ===
The Chrysler Pacifica, derived from the Chrysler Town & Country, was given an exterior and interior restyling. Similar to a full-size conversion van, the Pacifica was given a raised roof for increased headroom, with a full-length skylight. In a 2+2+2 seating layout, the Pacifica was fitted with power-operated middle-row seats (with power-operated footrests). The exterior adapted design elements of the flagship Chrysler LHS sedan, including a (smaller) version of its grille and modified versions of its headlamps.

From 2004 to 2008, the Chrysler Pacifica nameplate saw use on a production vehicle, as a CUV derived from the Grand Caravan/Town & Country. For 2017, the Pacifica nameplate was again revived, used on the current generation of Chrysler-division minivans.

=== Dodge Caravan R/T ===
As a follow-up to the 1996 Dodge Caravan ESS, the 1999 Dodge Caravan R/T replaced the 3.8L V6 with the 3.5L V6 of the Chrysler 300M, increasing output to 253 hp, paired with the 4-speed AutoStick transmission. The Dodge Caravan adapted several styling elements from the Dodge Viper RT/10, including hood scoops (carried directly over from the Viper), and a redesigned lower fascia that shifted the Dodge "crosshair" grille into the lower bumper (with the addition of foglamps from the Viper). The interior featured a performance-oriented theme, with brushed aluminum trim for the trim and door panels, with black leather seats and racing-style pedals.

From 2011 to 2016, Dodge produced the Grand Caravan R/T as an trim variant, though the option was largely cosmetic.

=== Plymouth Voyager XG ===
Derived from the Plymouth Voyager, the Plymouth Voyager XG was a four-seat minivan geared towards active lifestyles of younger drivers. Externally similar to the standard Voyager, the XG was distinguished by its 17-inch wheels (shared with the Plymouth Prowler), and body-color bumpers and grille. The interior was given a full-length retractable fabric sunroof, with a large removable storage pod placed behind the seats.

The Voyager XG featured the powertrain of the export-market Chrysler Voyager, with a 2.5L diesel engine and a 5-speed manual transmission.

== Awards ==
The new minivans earned unanimous critical acclaim: the Dodge Caravan was the 1996 Motor Trend Car of the Year (the first and only minivan to ever win the award) and the 1996 North American Car of the Year; and the vans were on Car and Driver magazine's Ten Best list for 1996 and 1997.
