= Electromagnetic Personnel Interdiction Control =

Weapon of the United States armed forces

Electromagnetic Personal Interdiction Control (E.P.I.C.) is a weapon of the U.S. Navy that works by sending out an electromagnetic pulse that affects the sense of balance and makes the target feel ill and throw up. This is a most effective way to neutralize an enemy without actually harming him or her.

The weapon has not been developed further than to a prototype.
