= Plymouth Voyager =

Passenger cars produced by Chrysler

Plymouth Voyager/Grand Voyager
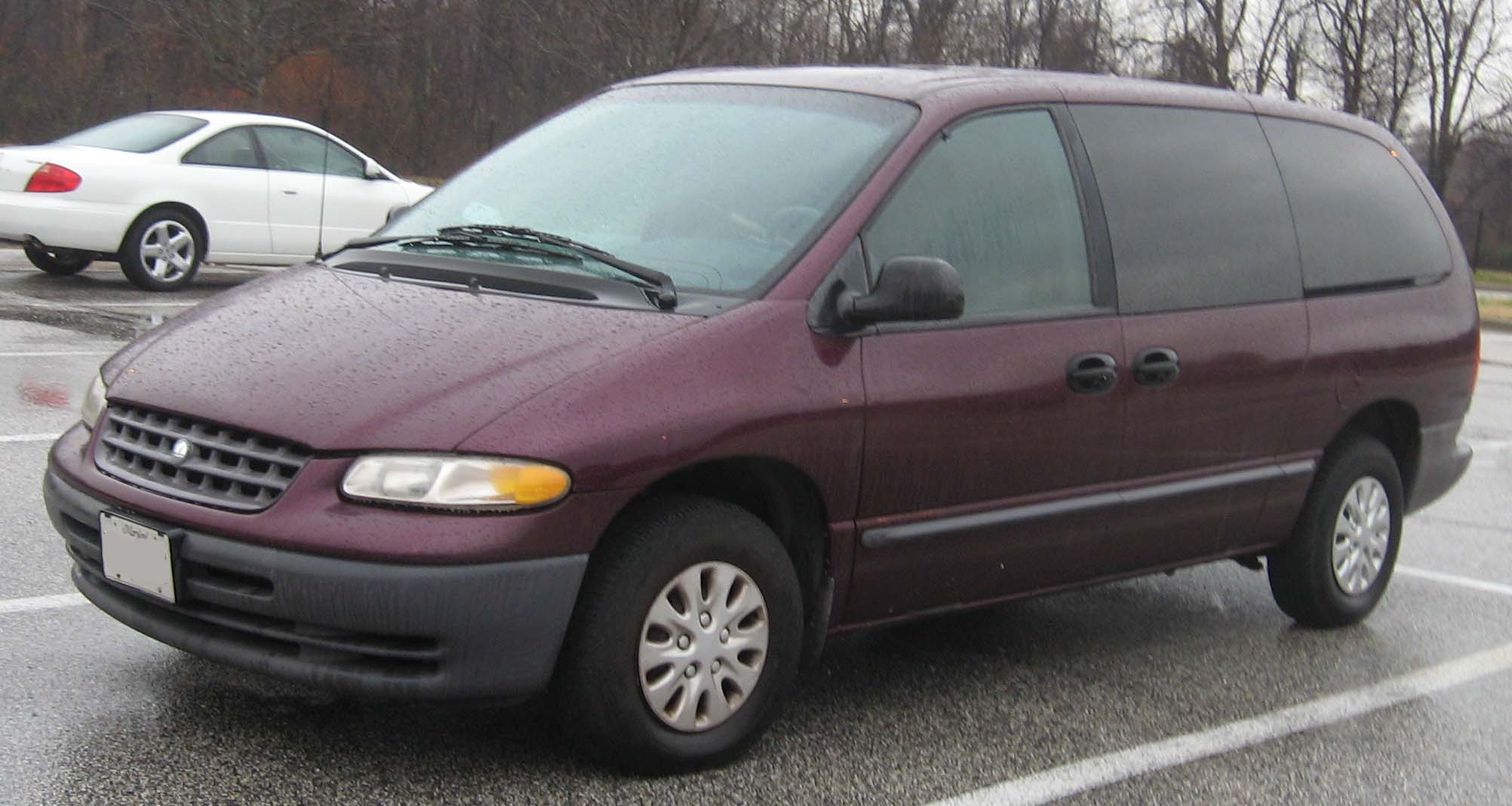
- Plymouth Grand Voyager (NS)

Overview
- Manufacturer: Chrysler Corporation (1974–1998); DaimlerChrysler (1998–2000)
- Also called: Chrysler Voyager/Grand Voyager (Mexico; USA for 2001–2003 only)
- Production: 1974–2000

Body and chassis
- Class: Minivan (1984–2000); Full-size van (1974–1983)

Chronology
- Successor: Chrysler/Lancia Voyager (US, 2001–2003, Mexico SWB until 2007)

Plymouth Voyager is a nameplate for a range of vans that were marketed by Plymouth from 1974 to 2000. One of the few light trucks marketed by the division, the Voyager was initially a full-size van, later becoming one of the first minivans successfully marketed in North America.

For its first generation, the Voyager was a full-size van, serving as the Plymouth counterpart of the Dodge Sportsman (renamed Dodge Ram Wagon for 1980). For 1984, the Voyager was reintroduced as a minivan, becoming a divisional counterpart of the Dodge Caravan. For 1987, the model line was expanded with the extended-wheelbase Plymouth Grand Voyager and the luxury-trim Chrysler Town & Country for 1990. Three generations of the model line were sold until the closure of the Plymouth brand during the 2000 model year.

The Voyager nameplate has also seen use multiple times under the Chrysler brand. From 1988 to 2016, the Chrysler Voyager nameplate was used for export-market minivans. Following the demise of Plymouth, Chrysler reintroduced the Voyager as a Chrysler for North America, discontinuing the model after 2003.

The Chrysler minivans (including versions sold under Chrysler, Ram, Lancia, and Volkswagen nameplates) are a model family that collectively rank as the 13th best-selling automotive model line worldwide. The Plymouth Voyager minivan was assembled by Chrysler at its Windsor Assembly facility in Windsor, Ontario, Canada; from 1987 to 2000, the Voyager was also assembled at Saint Louis Assembly in Fenton, Missouri (North plant from 1987 through 1995; South plant from 1996 until 2000). The full-size Plymouth Voyager van was assembled from 1974 until 1983 at the Pillette Road Truck Assembly in Windsor, Ontario, Canada, and at the St. Louis North Assembly Plant in Fenton, Missouri.

== Full-size van (AB; 1974–1983) ==
Full-size Voyager
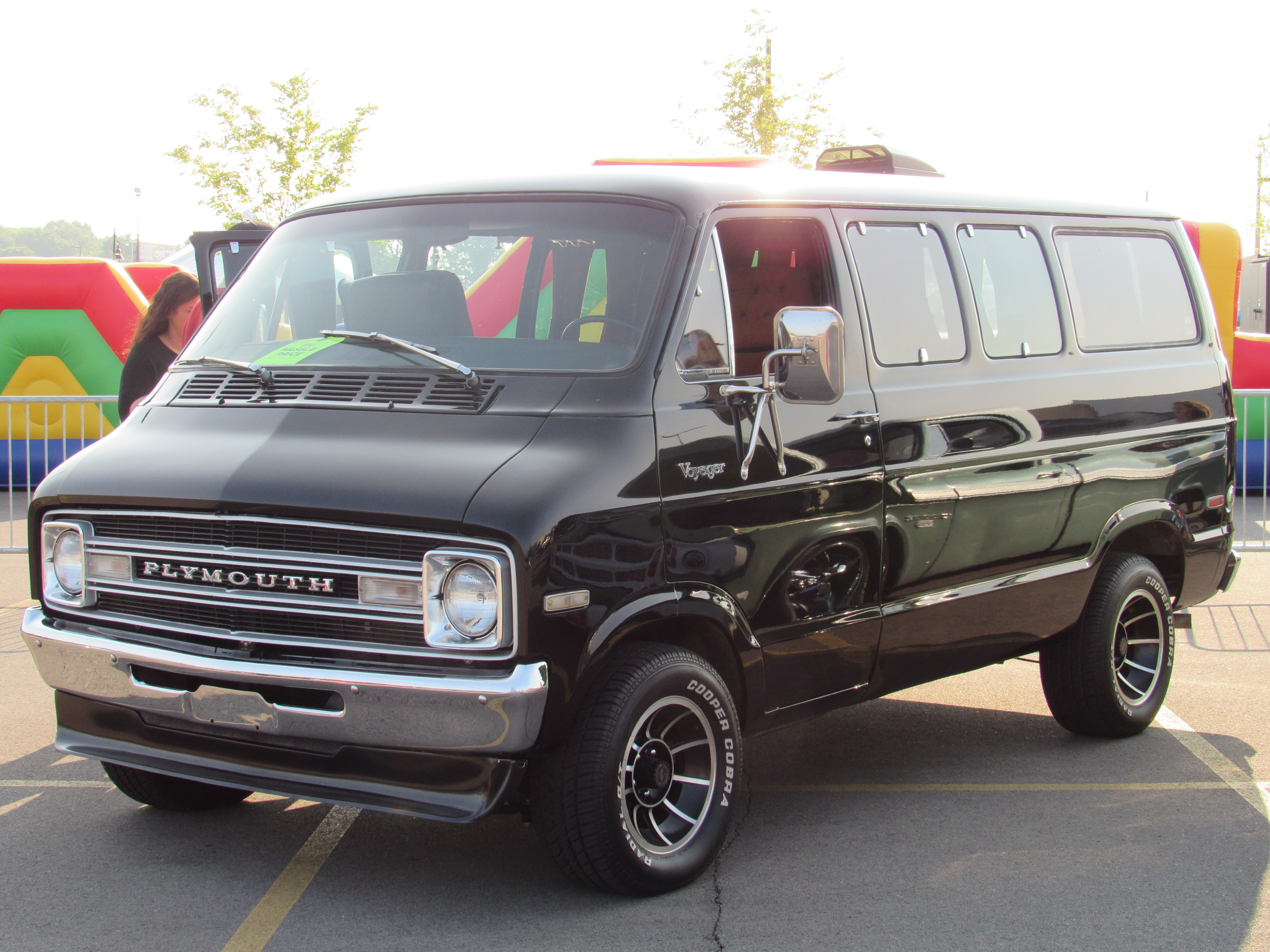
- 1978 Plymouth Voyager

Overview
- Also called: Dodge Sportsman; Dodge Ram Wagon
- Production: January 1974–1983
- Assembly: United States: Fenton, Missouri (St. Louis North Assembly Plant) (1974-1980); Canada: Windsor, Ontario (Pillette Road Truck Assembly) (1974-1983)

Body and chassis
- Body style: 4-door van 6-door van
- Layout: FR layout
- Platform: Chrysler AB platform

Powertrain
- Engine: 318 cu in (5.2 L) LA V8; 360 cu in (5.9 L) LA V8
- Transmission: 3-speed TorqueFlite automatic

For the 1974 model year, Plymouth debuted light trucks under its own brand (for the first time since 1942), introducing the Voyager full-size van and the Trail Duster SUV. The Voyager was a Plymouth counterpart of the Dodge Sportsman van, while the Trail Duster was derived from the Dodge Ramcharger. In contrast to Dodge, Plymouth only marketed the Voyager as a passenger van; as with the Sportsman, the model line was offered with seating options for up to 15 passengers (depending on body length); the 18-inch longer Extended Body Voyager was derived from the Dodge MaxiWagon.

1974-1977 Plymouth Voyagers were visually similar to their Dodge counterparts, centering Plymouth badging within the grille (a design shared by Fargo vans and 1971-1973 Dodges).

Dependent on body size, the Voyager was sold in PB100, PB200, and PB300 series. In 1976, the Voyager was joined by the Voyager Custom and Voyager Sport (to better match its Dodge counterpart). For 1977, the single-panel rear door (introduced in 1975 as an option) became standard (trading places with the two-panel rear door). The rear seat mountings were redesigned, allowing for easier removal.

For 1978 and 1979, the Voyager followed its Dodge counterpart through a two-year transition of the model line into its second generation. 1978 brought major structural changes, as a redesigned B-pillar on long-wheelbase models saw the deletion of the filler panels between the front doors and side doors (on the driver side, one fewer window); On extended-length vans, the body was fitted with wraparound rear corner windows to improve rear visibility. The interior underwent a redesign with all-new trim and seats, with the dashboard redesigned to increase parts commonality with newer Chrysler vehicles (Dodge would use this design through 1997). 1979 brought a taller, longer hoodline and a larger grille (though large-block V8 engines were retired by Chrysler), and redesigned headlamp clusters (in contrast to Dodge, the Voyager was fitted with four headlamps as standard). With the exception of its Plymouth badging, the Voyager was essentially indistinguishable from its Dodge Royal Sportsman counterpart.

For 1981, the Plymouth Voyager gained a degree of brand differentiation as Dodge dropped the Sportsman/Tradesman branding in favor of Dodge Ram Wagon/Van, featuring large RAM badging on the door. In contrast, the Voyager retained the badging introduced in 1979.

Following the 1983 model year, Plymouth discontinued the full-size Voyager van, transferring the nameplate to its 1984 minivan. As the Trail Duster had been discontinued after 1981, the full-size Voyager would become the final full-size truck offered by the Plymouth brand.

== Background ==
During the early 1970s, Ford and Chrysler had begun work on smaller passenger vans as "garageable vans"; the vehicles were intended to feature a lower height (though taller than a station wagon, the design would be easily accommodated within a standard-height garage). Also, the smaller vans were intended primarily to carry people, not cargo, so design and comfort were prioritized over payload.

The Ford project led to the 1973 Ford Carousel, a running prototype deriving its body and chassis from the Ford Club Wagon then in development for 1975; the Carousel was restyled with its own body, lowered to a height of approximately 6 feet. Though supported by both Lee Iacocca and Henry Ford II, internal opposition from other Ford executives led to the cancellation of the Carousel project during 1974.

At the same time, Dodge Truck Engineering began design work of its own "garageable van" (to market a small van as a practical second car). Though the Volkswagen Microbus had established popularity, designers sought to develop a safer and more practical vehicle. To utilize then-existing Chrysler powertrains, a front-engine, rear-wheel drive layout was selected. In 1972, designers began developing clay models of a potential exterior design (along with interior layouts). However, the Chrysler small van project was shelved, as Chrysler management cited the lack of funds and that it was a design that had no competition from either Ford or GM.

At the end of 1977, Chrysler started development on a new small van project that would ultimately become the Chrysler minivans. Following the firing of both Lee Iacocca and Hal Sperlich from Ford, the two joined Chrysler in similar capacities during 1978. Beginning life as a modified version of the Dodge Omni, the new vans adopted a front-wheel drive layout. The models grew in size as designers determined the Omni/Horizon chassis would be too small with an underpowered powertrain. Following the project approval, the "T-115" small van program was funded through a large portion of the Chrysler federal loan guarantees.

The Chrysler minivans launched a few months ahead of the Renault Espace (the first MPV/minivan in Europe)— effectively creating the modern minivan segment in the United States, followed by the introduction of the Chevrolet Astro/GMC Safari and the Ford Aerostar.

== First generation (S; 1984–1990) ==
First generation (S)
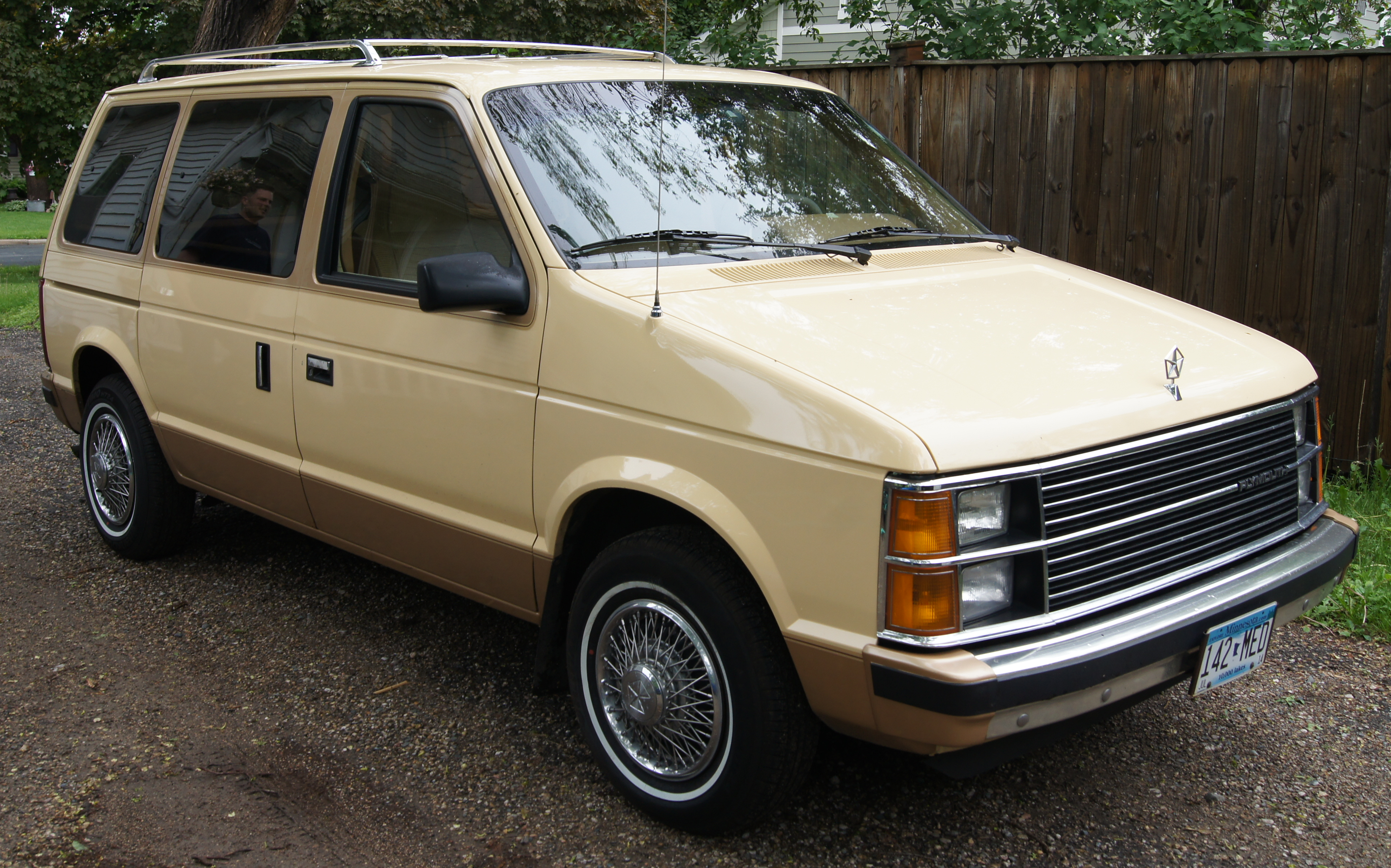
- 1985 Plymouth Voyager LE

Overview
- Production: 1984–1990
- Assembly: Canada: Windsor, Ontario (Windsor Assembly); United States: Fenton, Missouri (St. Louis North Assembly Plant) (1987-1990)

Body and chassis
- Body style: 3-door minivan
- Layout: Transverse front-engine, front-wheel drive
- Platform: Chrysler S platform
- Related: Dodge Caravan; Chrysler Town & Country; Chrysler Voyager

Powertrain
- Engine: 2.2 L K I4; 2.5 L K I4; 2.5 L Turbo I4; 2.6 L Mitsubishi G54B I4; 3.0 L Mitsubishi 6G72 V6; 3.3 L EGA V6
- Transmission: 4-speed A460 manual 5-speed manual 3-speed A413 automatic 3-speed A470 automatic 3-speed A670 automatic 4-speed A604 automatic

Dimensions
- Wheelbase: Grand: 119.1 in (3,025 mm); SWB: 112 in (2,845 mm)
- Length: Grand: 190.5 in (4,839 mm); SWB:175.9 in (4,468 mm); SWB LE: 177.3 in (4,503 mm); 1989-1990 Grand LE: 191.9 in (4,874 mm)
- Width: 1984-88: 72.2 in (1,834 mm); 1989-1990: 72 in (1,829 mm)
- Height: 1984-88 SWB: 64.4 in (1,636 mm); 1984-88 Grand: 64.7 in (1,643 mm); 1989-1990: 64.8 in (1,646 mm)

For 1984, Plymouth released its first new Voyager for the first time in 10 years, making it the counterpart of the all-new Dodge Caravan minivan. Though the two vehicles shared a distinct (larger) model architecture, the minivans shared design commonality with the K-Cars; along with portions of the interior, the Voyager shared its instrument cluster and some dashboard controls with the Plymouth Reliant.

Similar in length to an Aries/Reliant station wagon (though several inches wider), the Voyager was designed with a passenger-side sliding door, but its front-wheel drive chassis gave it a much lower floor height than its full-size namesake. Similar to a hatchback or mid-size station wagons, the rear door was a single-piece liftgate. Three trim levels were offered: an unnamed base Voyager, mid-grade Voyager SE, and deluxe Voyager LE; the Voyager LE was offered with optional simulated woodgrain paneling.

The Voyager was on Car and Driver magazine's Ten Best list for 1985.

For 1987, the Voyager received a mid-cycle update (switching from four headlights to two), allowing for better brand separation between the Voyager and Caravan. The extended-wheelbase Grand Voyager was introduced (slightly shorter than the Dodge Dynasty) for SE and LE trims, adding 7 inches of wheelbase for additional rear seat and cargo space.

For 1989, the flagship two-tone Voyager LX trim was added, sharing many of its features with the monochromatic Dodge Caravan ES.

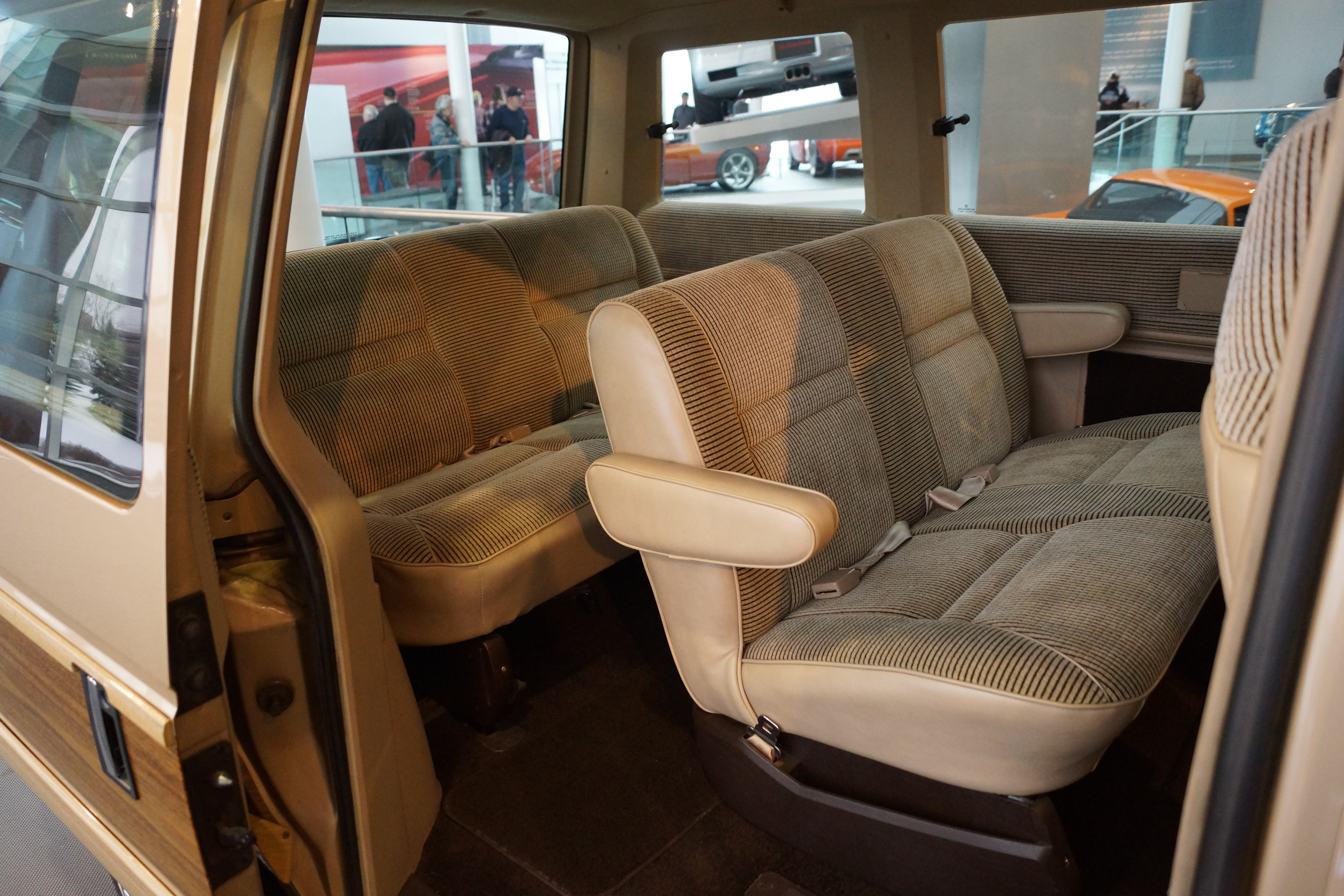
1984 Plymouth Voyager LE rear seats

Safety features included 3-point seat belts for the front two passengers and lap belts for rear passengers. Standard on all Voyagers were legally mandated side-impact reinforcements for all seating front and rear outboard positions. Safety features such as airbags or ABS were not available. The Voyager, along with the Dodge Caravan, are considered to be some of the earliest mass-produced vehicles to include dedicated cup holders outside of the glovebox.

Original commercials for the 1984 Voyager featured magician Doug Henning as a spokesperson to promote the Voyager "Magic Wagon's" versatility, cargo space, low step-in height, passenger volume, and maneuverability. Later commercials in 1989 featured rock singer Tina Turner. Canadian commercials in 1990 featured pop singer Celine Dion.

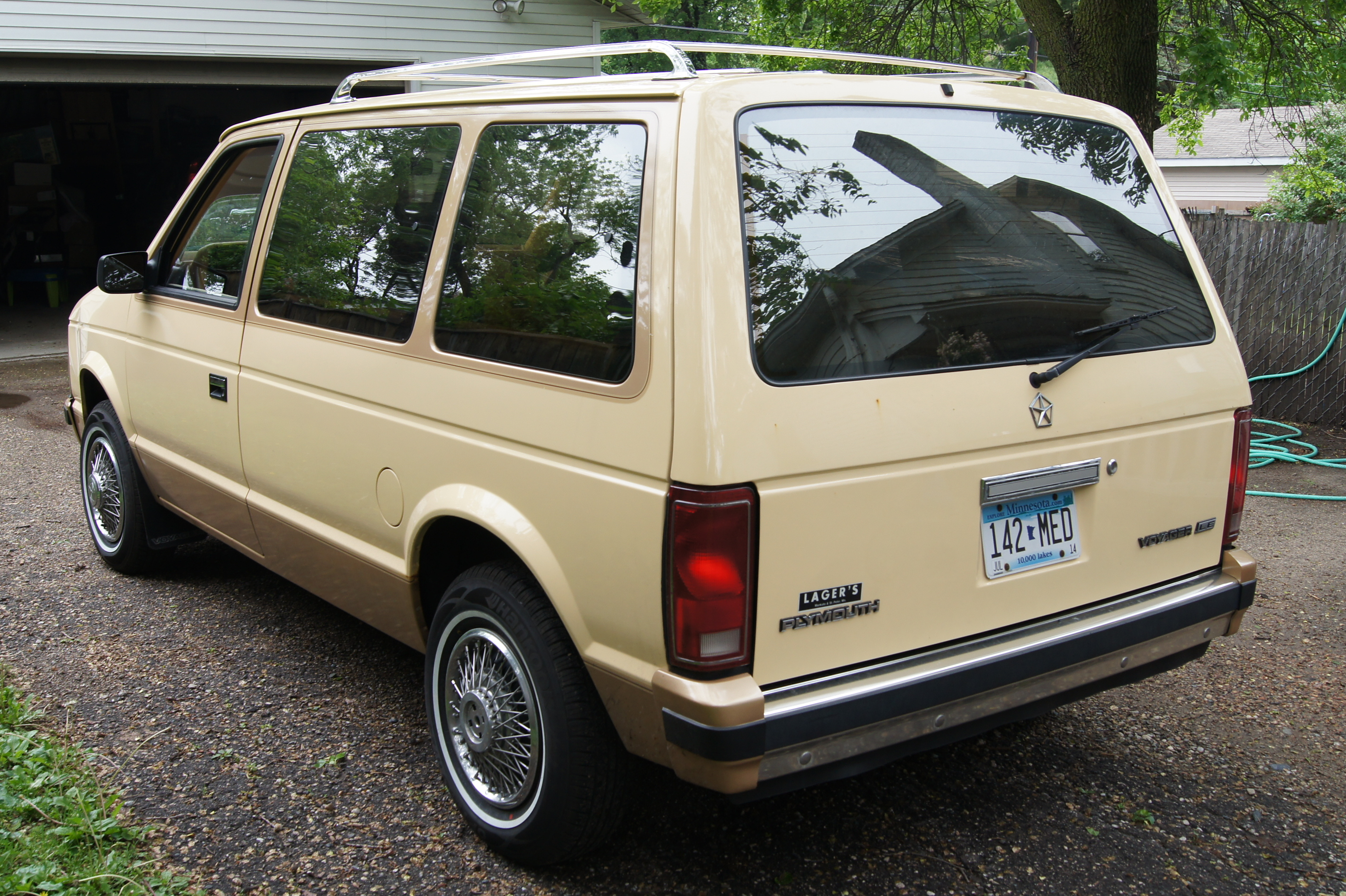
1985 Plymouth Voyager LE rear

=== Seating ===
1984-1986 Voyagers could be equipped for five, six, or seven passengers, with an eight-passenger variant available only in 1985. Five-passenger seating, standard on all trim levels, consisted of two front bucket seats and an intermediate three-passenger bench seat. In 1985, on base and SE models, the front buckets could be replaced by a 40/60 split three-passenger bench seat, bringing the total number of occupants to six. Seven-passenger seating was an option on SEs and LEs, with dual front buckets, an intermediate two-passenger bench, and a rear three-passenger bench. Eight-passenger seating was available on SE models only, with both the additional middle two-passenger bench and the three-passenger front bench. Depending on the configuration, the base model could seat up to six, the SE could seat up to eight, and the LE could seat up to seven.

The two bench seats in the rear were independently removable (though not foldable), and the large three-seat bench could also be installed in the second-row location via a second set of attachment points on the van's floor, ordinarily hidden with snap-in plastic covers. This configuration allowed for conventional five-passenger seating with a sizable cargo area in the rear. The latching mechanisms for the benches were very intuitive and easy to operate.

On base models, the front buckets were low-back items, upholstered with plain cloth or vinyl. On SEs, the buyer could choose between low-back buckets in deluxe cloth or high-back buckets in upgraded vinyl. LEs came standard with high-back front buckets, upholstered in either luxury cloth or luxury vinyl.

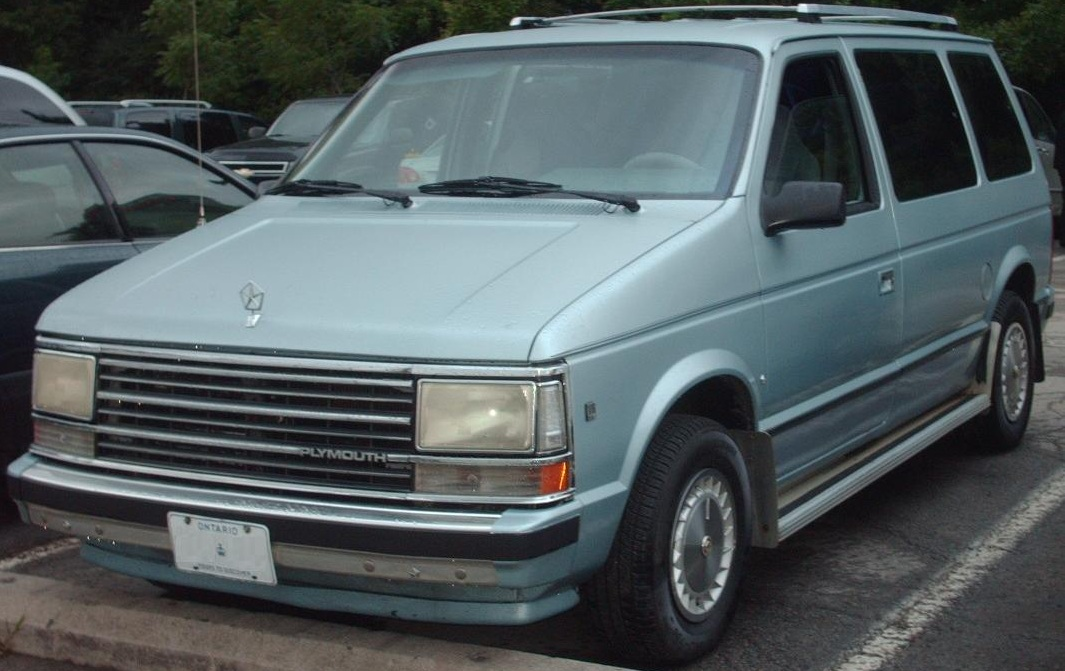
1987-1990 Plymouth Voyager SE

In 1985 and 1986, there was also a five-passenger version with a back seat that could be folded flat with the pull of a handle into a bed that filled the rear compartment from the back of the front seats to the rear. This option was known as the Magic Camper. The Magic Camper back seat had an extra rear-facing cushion that formed the back-most section of the bed when folded flat and the seat, though very heavy, was removable. The Magic Camper option included a tent that attached magnetically to the side of the vehicle allowing access in and out of the sliding side door.

For 1987, the six- and eight-passenger options were withdrawn, leaving seating for five standard and seven optional on the base and SE, and seating for seven with high-back front buckets standard on the LE, Grand SE, and Grand LE. The deluxe cloth upholstery was now standard on base and all SE models, with the luxury vinyl optional on SEs. On LEs, luxury cloth came standard and for the first time, leather seats were available on the LE models.

=== Powertrain details ===
==== Engines ====
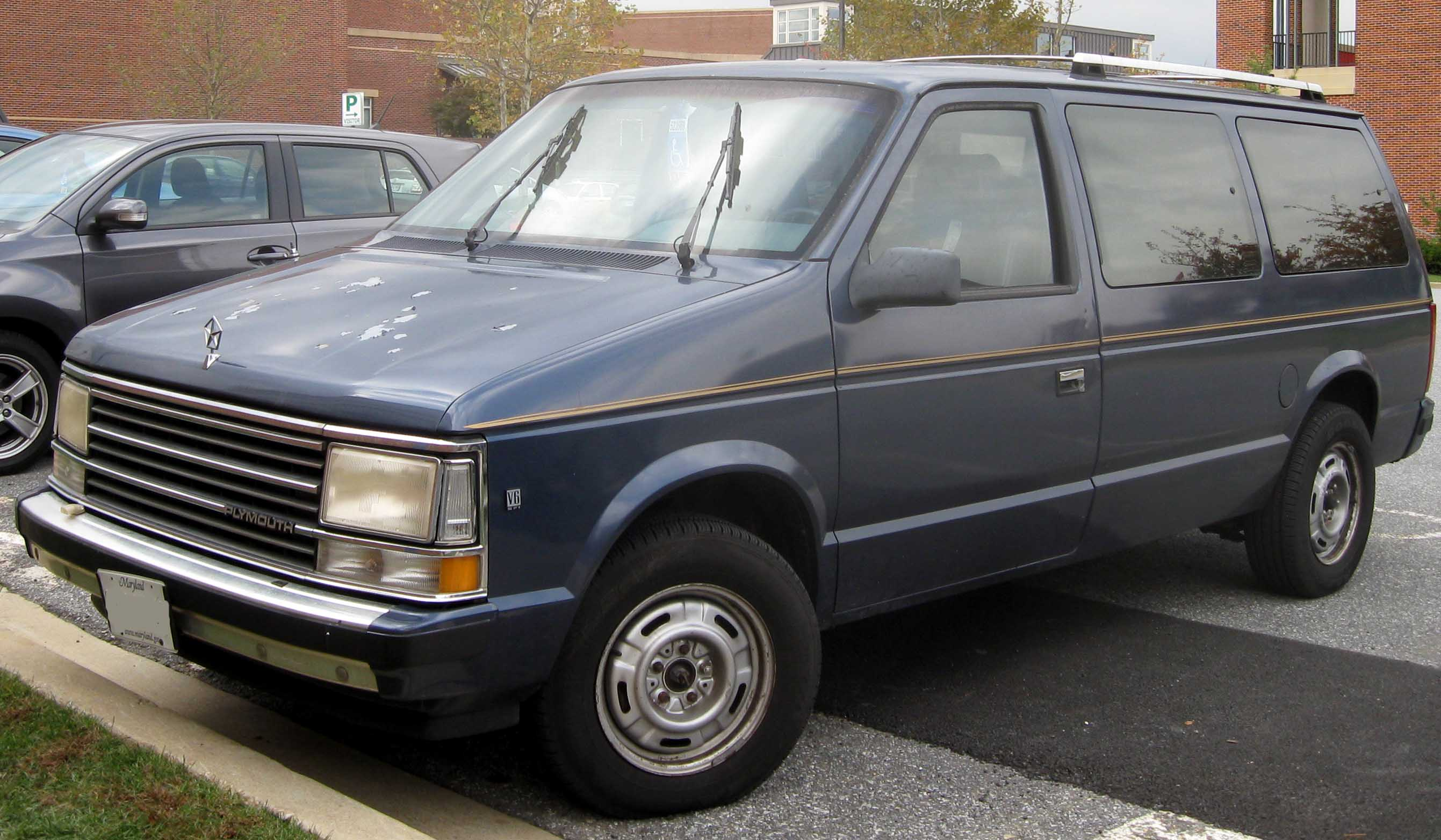
1987-1990 Plymouth Grand Voyager SE

For the first three years of production, two inline-4 engines with 2 barrel carburetors were offered. The base 2.2 L was from the Chrysler K-cars and produced 96 hp (72 kW) horsepower. The higher performance fuel-injected version of the 2.2 L engine later offered in the Chrysler K-cars was offered in the Voyager for the 1987 model year and remained the base engine until mid-1987. Alongside the 2.2 L, an optional Mitsubishi 2.6 L engine was available producing 104 hp (78 kW).

At launch, the Voyager's low horsepower to weight ratio had not been much of a concern. Its main competitors were the Toyota Van and the Volkswagen Vanagon, both of which offered similar performance. In mid-1987, the base 2.2 L I4 was replaced with a fuel-injected 2.5 L I4, which produced 100 hp (75 kW), while the Mitsubishi G54B I4 was replaced with the new fuel-injected 3.0 L Mitsubishi V6 producing 136 hp (101 kW) in March of that year.

A turbocharged version of the base 2.5 L producing 150 hp (112 kW) was available in 1989 and 1990. Also in 1989, revisions to the Mitsubishi V6 increased output to 142 hp (106 kW). In 1990, a new 150 hp (112 kW) 3.3 L V6 was added to the option list. Sales of the 2.5 turbo dwindled as a result, and it was dropped at the end of the year.

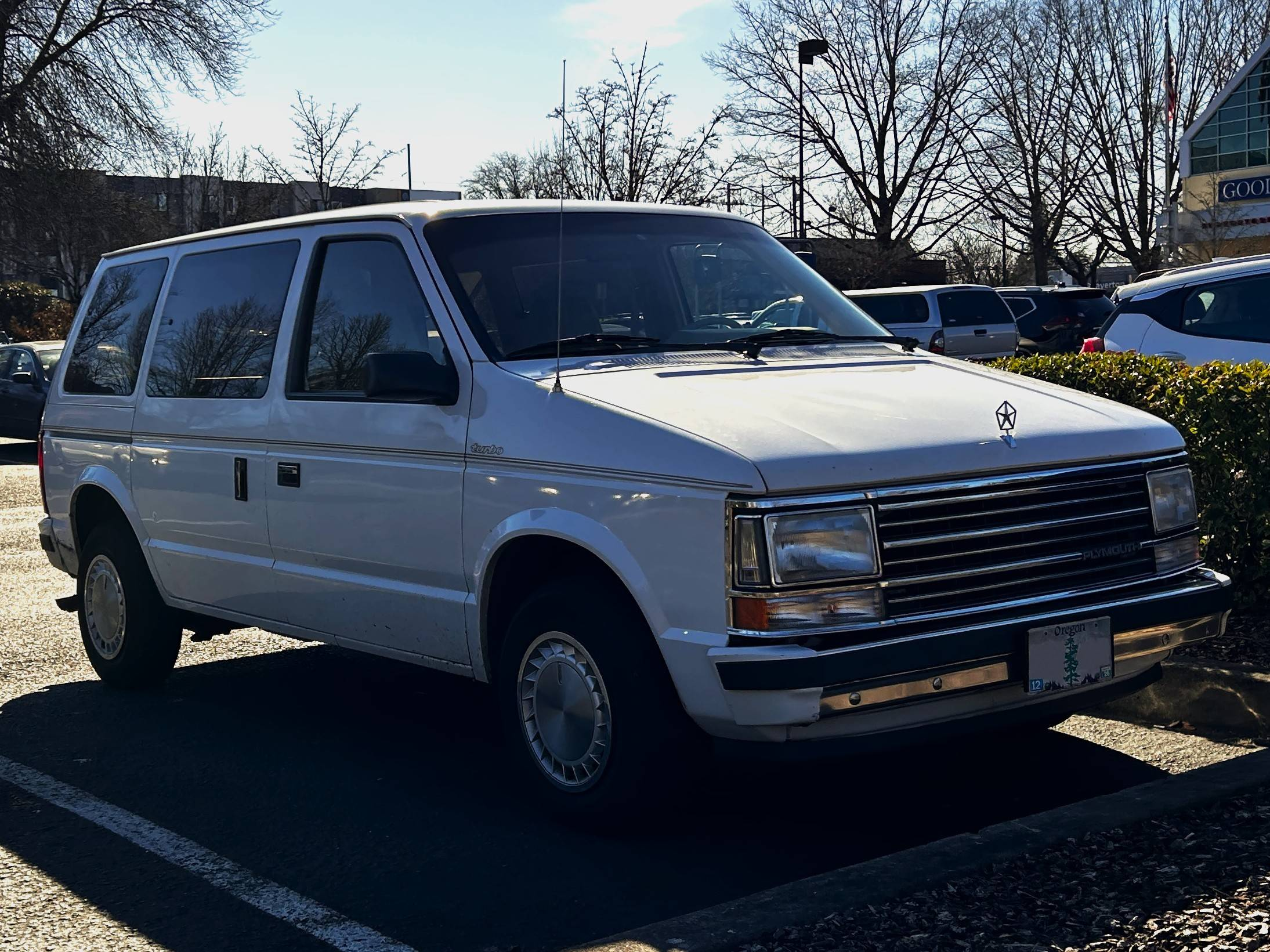
1989 Plymouth Voyager Turbo

- 1984–1987 2.2 L K I4, 96 hp (72 kW), 119 lb⋅ft (161 N⋅m)
- 1984–1987 2.6 L Mitsubishi G54B I4, 104 hp (78 kW), 142 lb⋅ft (193 N⋅m)
- 1987½–1990 2.5 L K I4, 100 hp (75 kW), 135 lb⋅ft (183 N⋅m)
- 1987½–1988 3.0 L Mitsubishi 6G72 V6, 136 hp (101 kW), 168 lb⋅ft (228 N⋅m)
- 1989–1990 2.5 L Turbo I4, 150 hp (112 kW), 180 lb⋅ft (244 N⋅m)
- 1989-1990 3.0 L Mitsubishi 6G72 V6, 142 hp (106 kW), 173 lb⋅ft (235 N⋅m)
- 1990 3.3 L EGA V6, 150 hp (112 kW), 180 lb⋅ft (244 N⋅m)

==== Transmissions ====
Both a three-speed TorqueFlite automatic transmission and a five-speed manual were available with all inline-four engines, including the turbocharged 2.5 L (this was a rare combination). V-6 engines were only offered with the fully hydraulically operated TorqueFlite, until the computer-controlled Ultradrive 4-speed automatic became available in 1989. The Ultradrive offered much better fuel economy and responsiveness, particularly when paired with the inline-four engine.

== Second generation (AS; 1991–1995) ==
Second generation (AS)
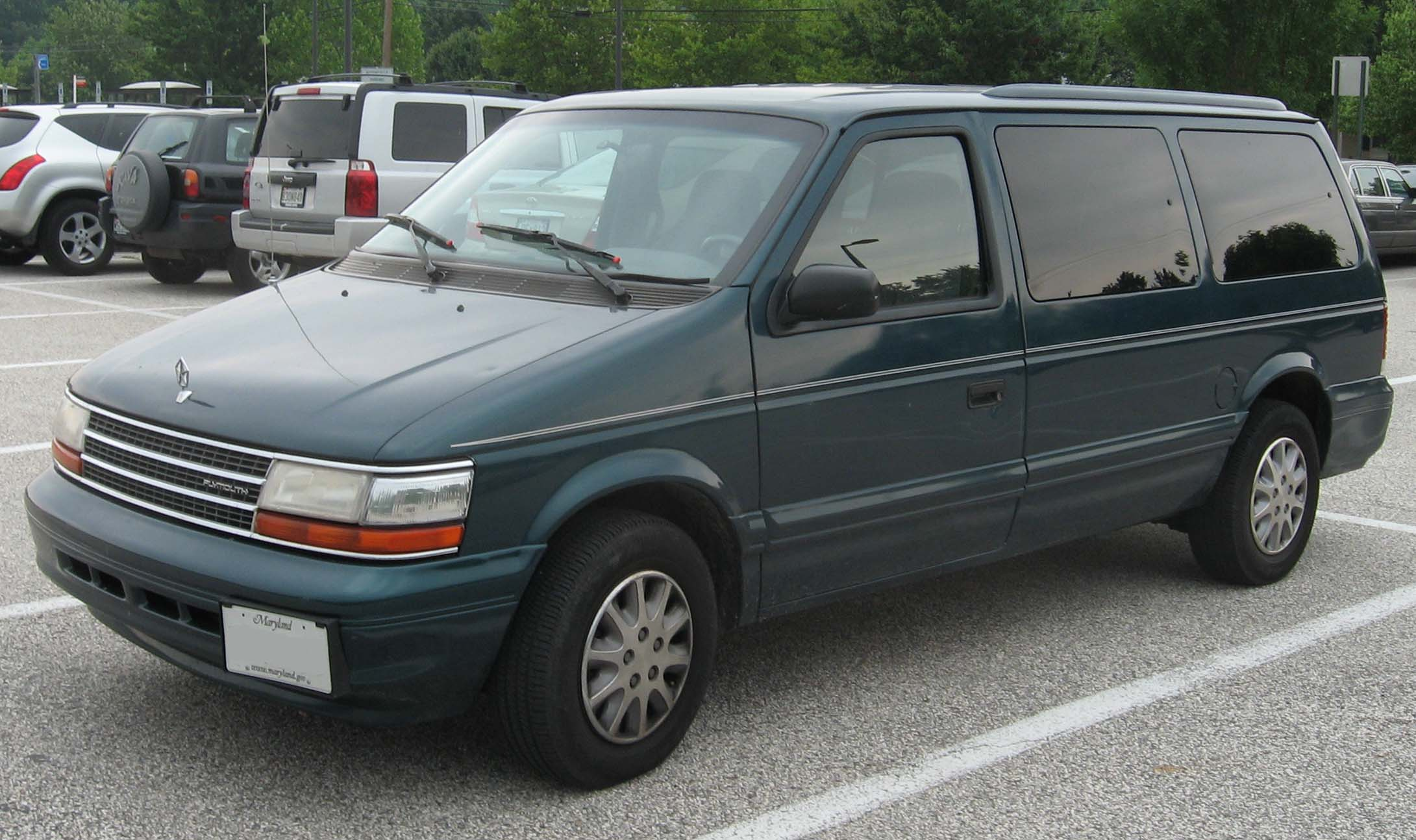

Overview
- Also called: Chrysler Voyager (Mexico and Europe)
- Production: August 14, 1990–August 1995
- Assembly: Fenton, Missouri, United States (St. Louis North Assembly Plant); Windsor, Ontario, Canada (Windsor Assembly)

Body and chassis
- Body style: 3-door minivan
- Layout: Transverse front-engine, front-wheel drive / all-wheel drive
- Platform: Chrysler AS platform
- Related: Chrysler Town & Country; Dodge Caravan

Powertrain
- Engine: 2.5 L K I4; 3.0 L Mitsubishi 6G72 V6; 3.3 L EGA V6; 3.8 L EGH V6
- Transmission: 5-speed manual 3-speed TorqueFlite automatic 4-speed Ultradrive automatic

Dimensions
- Wheelbase: SWB: 112.3 in (2,852 mm); Grand: 119.3 in (3,030 mm)
- Length: SWB: 178.1 in (4,524 mm); Grand: 192.8 in (4,897 mm)
- Width: 72 in (1,829 mm)
- Height: SWB: 64.2 in (1,631 mm); Grand: 64.8 in (1,646 mm); 1991-93 AWD: 65.9 in (1,674 mm); 1994-95 AWD: 65.8 in (1,671 mm); 1994-95 LE SWB: 64.3 in (1,633 mm)
- Curb weight: 3,305 lb (1,499 kg); 3,531 lb (1,602 kg) (Grand Voyager)

The Plymouth Voyager was modified for 1991 with new sheet metal. The S platform was still used, though renamed the "AS platform". These were the last Voyagers that were derived from the Chrysler K platform.

Trim levels were carried over from the previous generation. 1991 Voyagers were available in base, mid-grade SE, high-end LE, and high-end LX. The LX which was available only on short-wheelbase Voyagers, was marketed as a sport-luxury minivan and came with the most standard equipment including alloy wheels, fog lamps, and a wide array of power-operated features.

In later years various trim packages were offered on SE models. The "Sport Wagon" package available from 1993 until 1995 featured accent color (gray) bumpers and molding, fog lamps, and special aluminum wheels. The "Rallye" package offered in 1995, took the place of the departed LX model. It was more luxury-oriented, with lower body two-tone paint — regardless of upper body color, the lower body was painted "Driftwood Beige" — silver aluminum wheels, and special badging. The font first used for the Rallye's badging was adopted for all of Plymouth's badging from 1996 onward.

Interiors were more differentiated in this generation than on the first with a redesigned dashboard for 1994 featuring a passenger-side front airbag. and a seating package, marketed as the "Quad Command" seating package, available on SE, LE, and LX models. Quad command replaced the second-row bench with two individual bucket seats with a center aisle to the third-row bench. Interior options varied with trim levels and packages. Cloth seating was standard on all models; leather seating was a standalone extra-cost option on LE and LX models.

Only badging and minor cosmetics differentiated the Voyager from its Dodge Caravan rebadged variant. The Chrysler Town & Country shared the Voyager's headlamps and taillights. In Mexico, the Voyager was sold as a Chrysler and shared the chrome waterfall grille with the Town & Country.

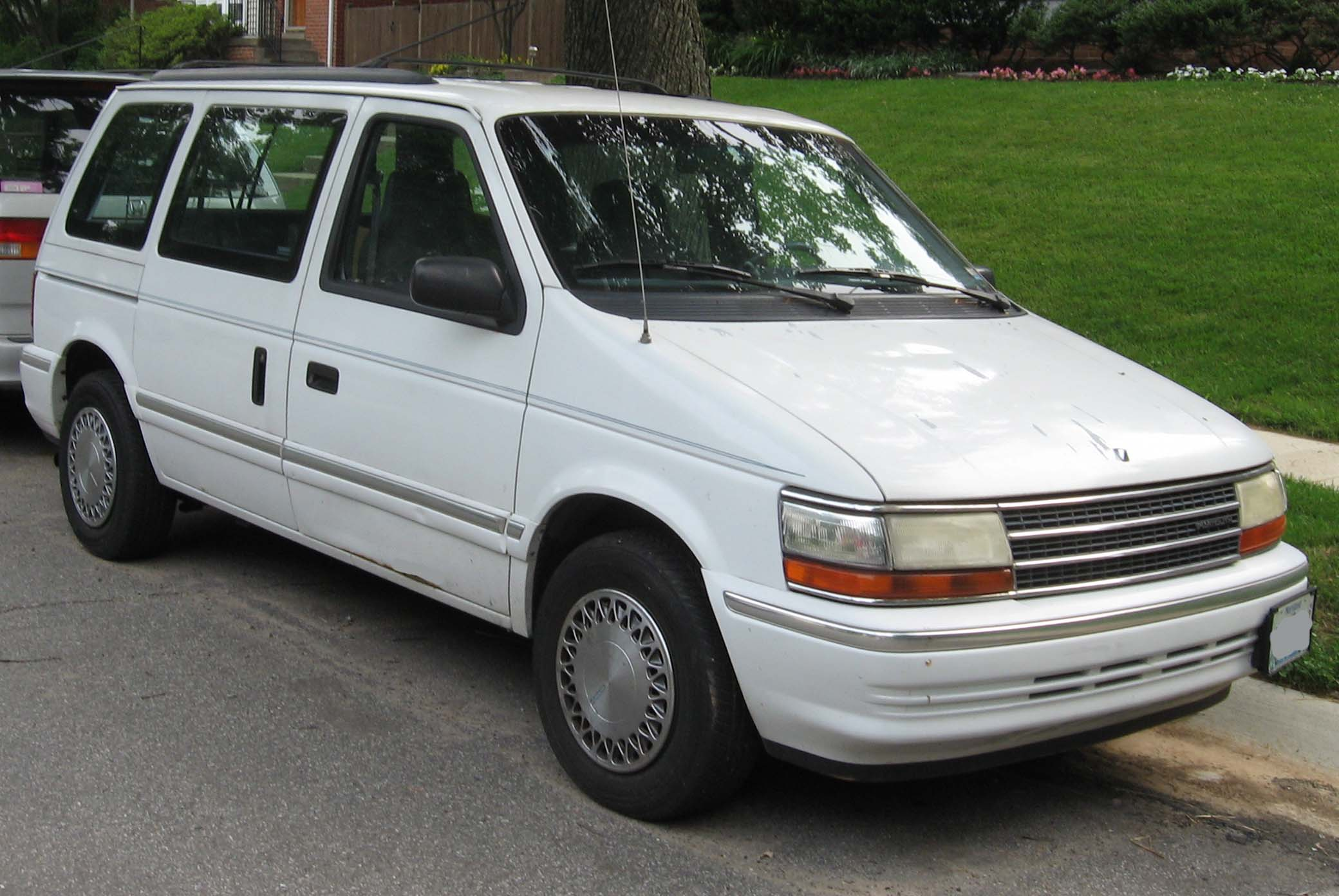
1992 or 1993 Plymouth Voyager

=== Features ===
This generation of vans brought additional features, including:

- "Quad Command" bucket seating (1990)
- Available all-wheel drive (1990)
- Available anti-lock brakes (1990)
- First driver's side airbag in a minivan (1991), made standard (1991), and first dual front airbags (1993)
- Integrated child safety seats (1991), improved design with recliners (1993)
- First minivan to meet 1998 U.S. federal safety standards (1993)

The turbocharged engine and Convert-A-Bed feature were dropped.

=== Engines ===
- 1991–1995 2.5 L K I4, 100 hp (75 kW), 135 lb⋅ft (183 N⋅m)
- 1991–1995 3.0 L Mitsubishi 6G72 V6, 142 hp (106 kW), 173 lb⋅ft (235 N⋅m)
- 1991–1993 3.3 L EGA V6, 150 hp (112 kW), 180 lb⋅ft (244 N⋅m)
- 1994–1995 3.3 L EGA V6, 162 hp (121 kW), 194 lb⋅ft (263 N⋅m)
- 1994–1995 3.8 L EGH V6, 162 hp (121 kW), 213 lb⋅ft (289 N⋅m)

=== Year-to-year changes ===
- 1991: Second-generation minivans released.
- 1992: A driver's side airbag was made standard for this year. Integrated child safety seats in the second-row bench were optional on 1992 Voyagers. The Grand Voyager was available with a lower-cost powertrain. A 142 hp (106 kW) 3.0 L V6 and a 3-speed automatic could be substituted for the standard 150 hp (112 kW) 3.3 L V6 with its 4-speed automatic. The 5-speed manual transmission could once again be paired with the base engine, which was now the 2.5 L I4 instead of the original 2.2 L I4.
- 1993: On 7-passenger models, the optional "Quad Command" bucket seats replaced the middle bench seat. The right bucket tilted forward to ease entry and exit to the rearmost bench. The front shoulder belts became height-adjustable and rear shoulder belts had lower anchor points and the horn button was black.
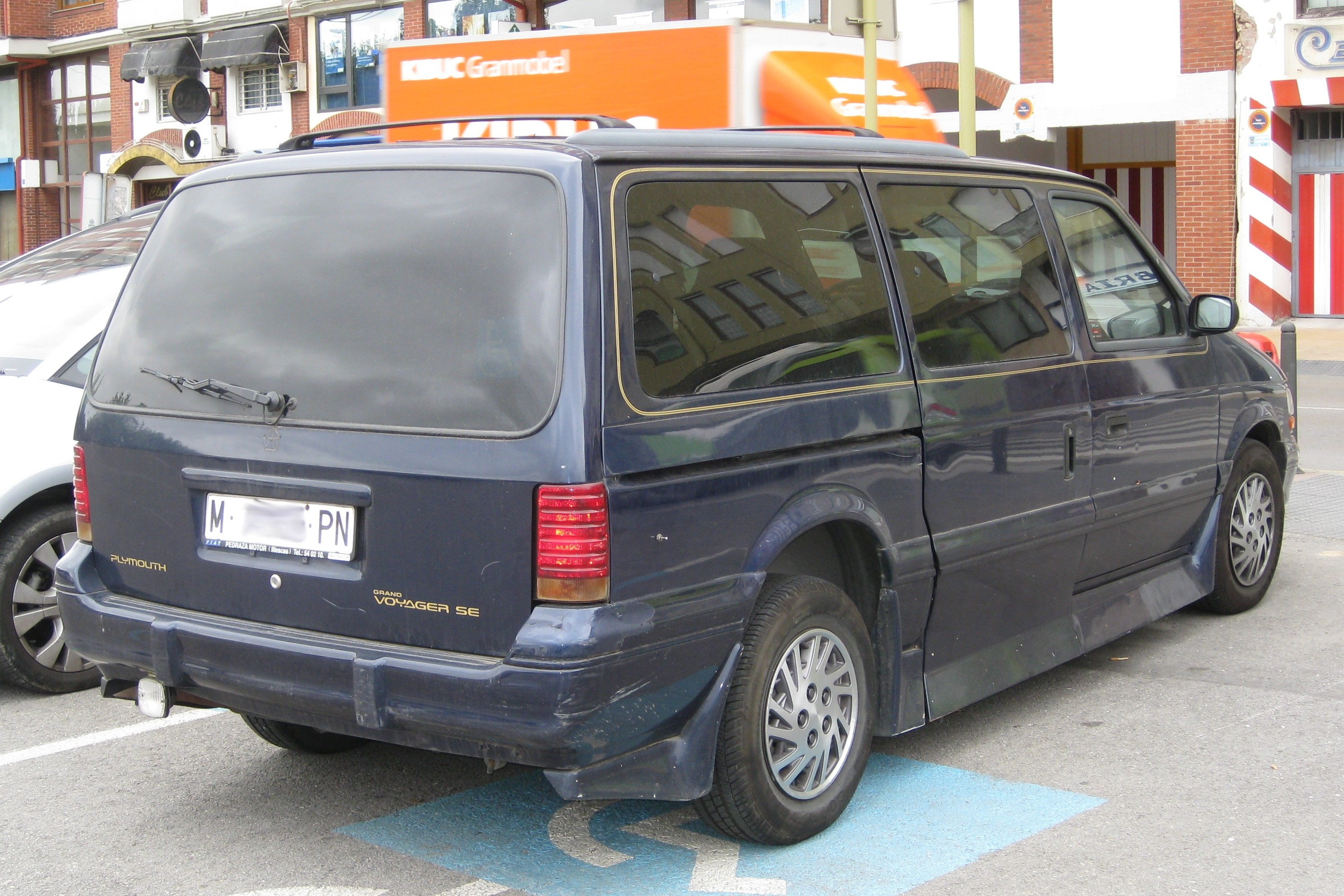
  1994 Plymouth Grand Voyager SE rear
- 1994: New bumpers and body moldings, and a redesigned dashboard appeared on all 1994 Voyagers. New safety features which included a passenger-side airbag and side door-guard beams enabled the Voyager to meet all passenger car safety requirements through 1998. A cassette player became standard on all models but the base and a CD player was available on all models. Under the hood, a 162 hp (121 kW) 3.8 L V6 was a new option for top-of-the-line Grand Voyager LE models. The 3.3 L V6 was upgraded to produce 162 hp (121 kW) as well. For 1994 the "10th Anniversary Edition" was an option on Voyager SE models; it had unique two-tone paint and badges.
- 1995: No major changes were made for 1995, except for the new Rallye option package available on SE models. Rallye models came with special silver-accent wheels and special two-toned paint on the lower body.

== Third generation (NS; 1996–2000) ==
Third generation (NS)
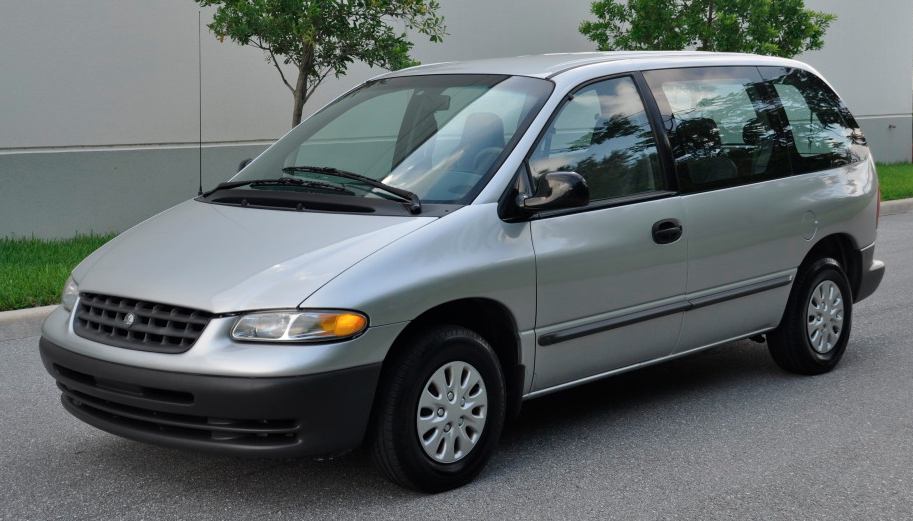

Overview
- Also called: Chrysler Voyager (Mexico; USA for 2000 only)
- Production: 1996–2000
- Assembly: Fenton, Missouri, United States (St. Louis South Assembly Plant); Windsor, Ontario, Canada (Windsor Assembly)

Body and chassis
- Body style: 3-door minivan 4-door minivan
- Layout: Transverse front-engine, front-wheel drive / all-wheel drive
- Platform: Chrysler NS platform
- Related: Chrysler Voyager; Chrysler Town & Country; Dodge Caravan

Powertrain
- Engine: 2.4 L EDZ I4 (gasoline); 3.0 L 6G72 V6 (gasoline); 3.3 L EGA V6 (gasoline/E85); 3.8 L EGH V6 (gasoline)
- Transmission: 3-speed TorqueFlite automatic 4-speed 41TE automatic 4-speed 41AE automatic

Dimensions
- Wheelbase: SWB: 113.3 in (2,878 mm); Grand: 119.3 in (3,030 mm)
- Length: SWB: 186.3 in (4,732 mm); Grand: 199.6 in (5,070 mm)
- Width: 76.8 in (1,951 mm)
- Height: 68.5 in (1,740 mm)
- Curb weight: 3,528 lb (1,600 kg); 3,680 lb (1,669 kg) (Grand Voyager)

The 1996 Plymouth Voyager was redesigned from the ground up. The previous K-car automobile platform and architecture were replaced with modern components and utilized Chrysler's cab-forward design. The third generation redesign was built on the new Chrysler NS platform and included a driver's-side sliding door, a minivan first.

The Voyager was listed on Car and Driver magazine's Ten Best list for 1996 and 1997.

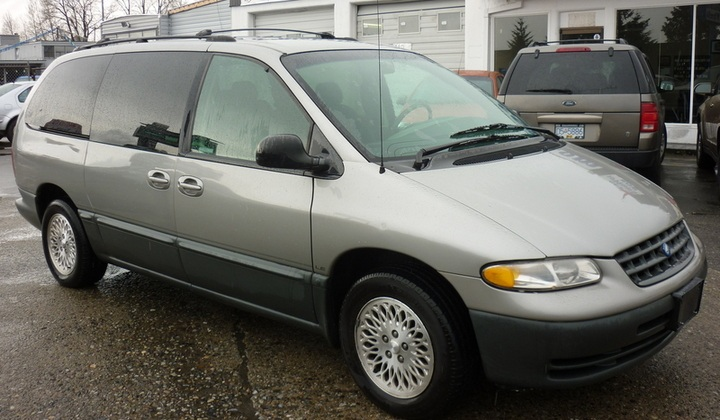
1997 Plymouth Grand Voyager LE

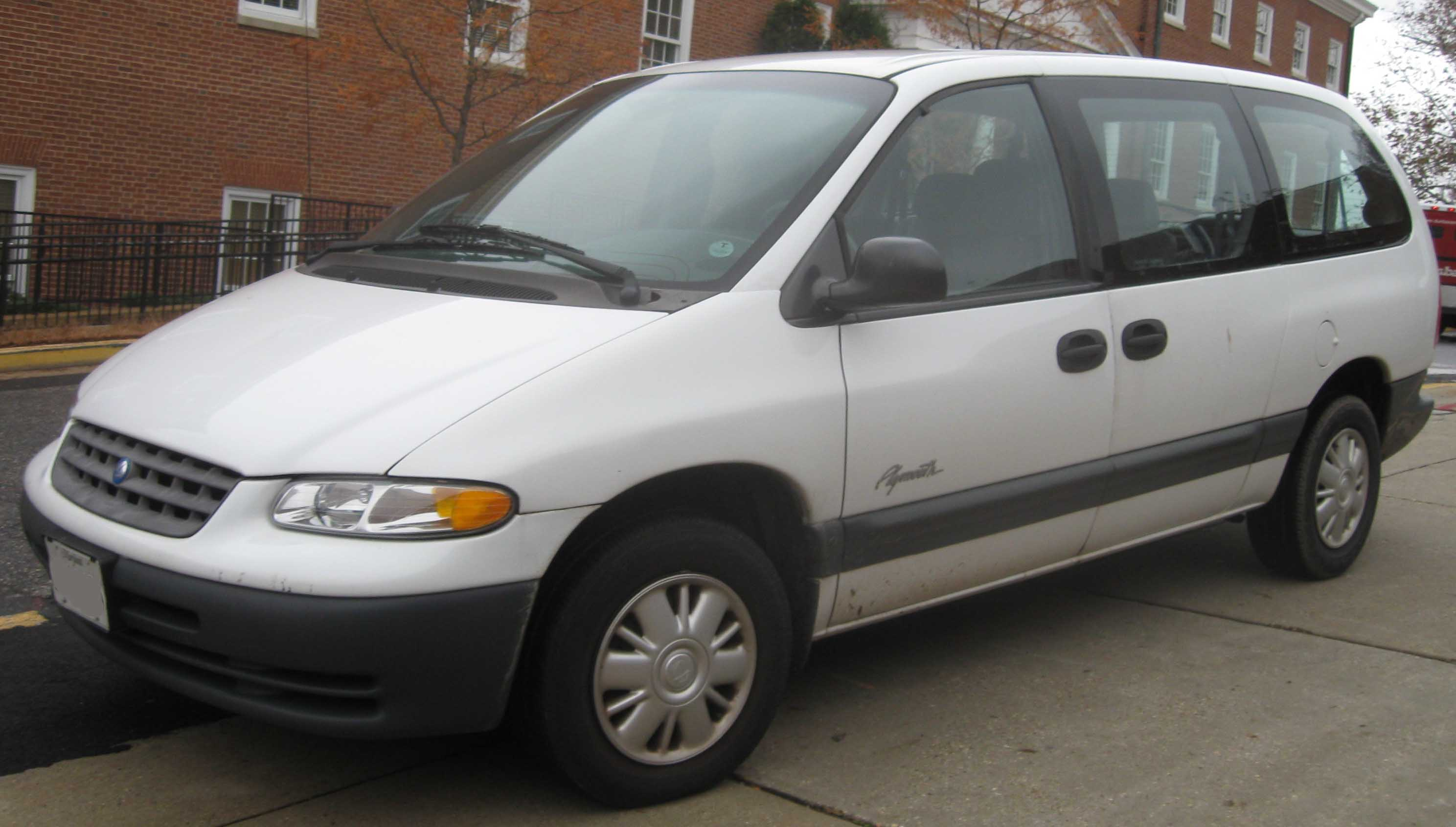
1996-2000 Plymouth Grand Voyager SE

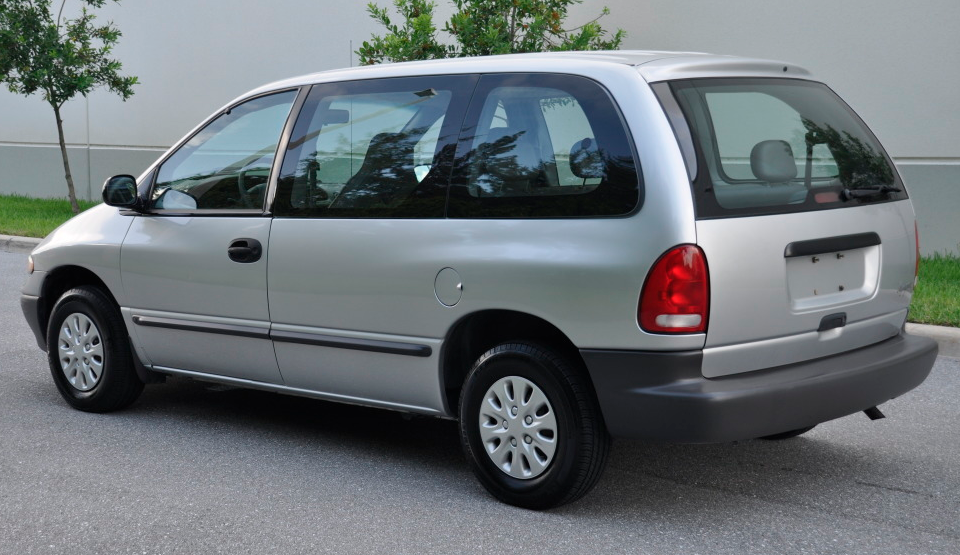
2000 Plymouth Voyager rear

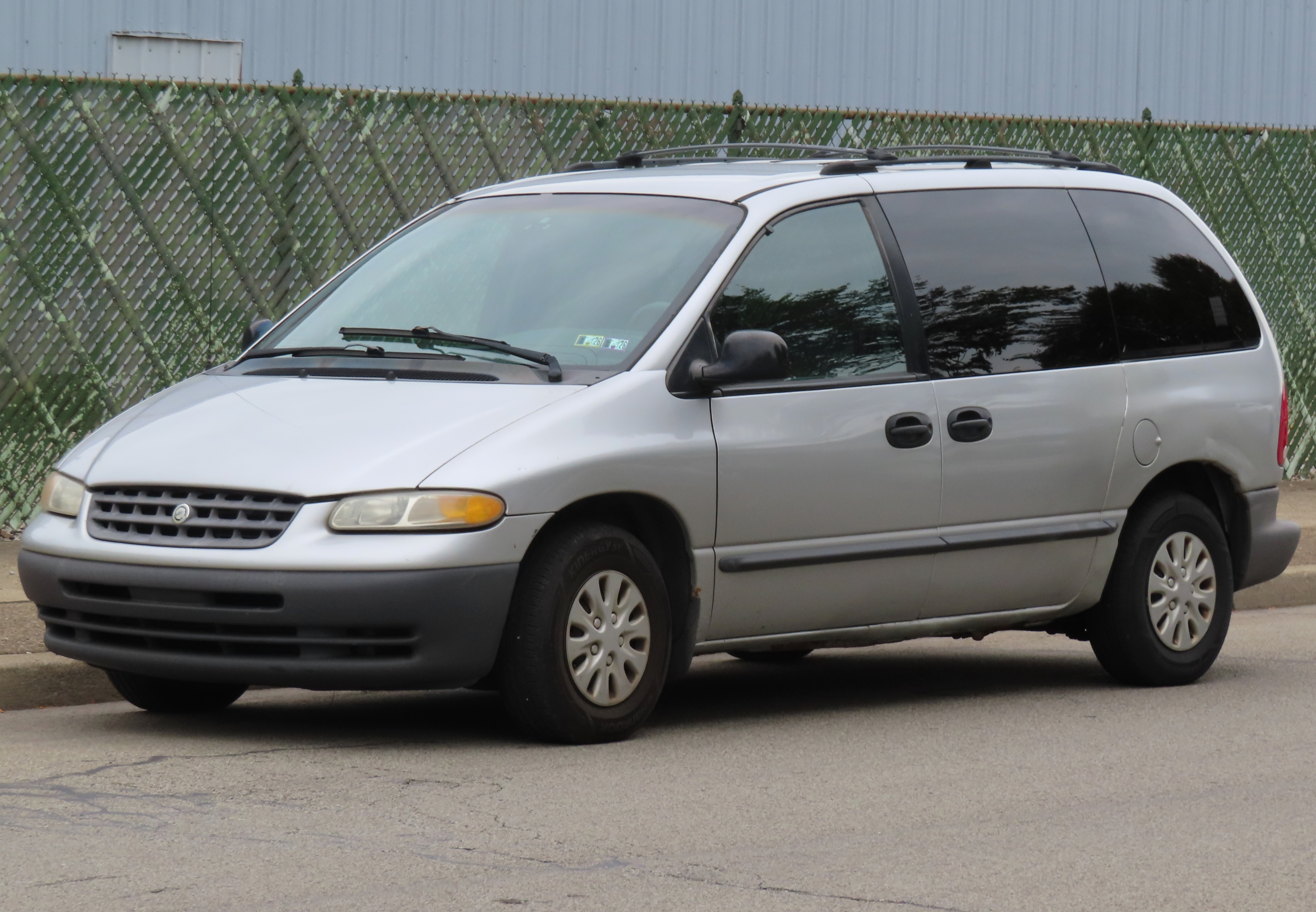
2000 Chrysler Voyager

In a shift from previous minivans, the third-generation Voyager was marketed as the entry-level Chrysler minivan rather than as a direct counterpart of the Dodge Caravan. While sharing the same bodyshell, the Voyager and Caravan saw significant changes in body trim and feature content. Distinguished by a dark gray egg-crate grille (a body-color grille became an option in 1998), the Voyager used matte gray bumpers across all trim levels with matte gray side moldings. Before the calendar year 1996, the NS Voyager was produced with the Pentastar grille emblem and rear badging carried over from the previous model year, shifting to the "sailboat" Plymouth grille emblem and new badging in script font afterward.

The Voyager retained the base, SE, and LE trims from its predecessor. To reduce model overlap, the LE trim was discontinued in the United States (in favor of an expanded Town & Country range). To allow the Plymouth brand to remain competitive, the Rallye option package was introduced on the SE trim; along with exterior badging, the Rallye offered interior content featured in LE-trim Voyagers and Caravans. For 1998, the Rallye trim was renamed Expresso.

Third generation Voyagers and Grand Voyagers were equipped nearly identically to their Dodge counterparts, save for front fascias, badging, and the wheels on LE-trim vans, which are shared with the Town & Country. However, to maintain its position as the entry-level minivan, the Voyager was never produced with automatic headlights, fog lights, power driver's seat and power mirror memory, or auto-dimming rearview mirrors.

All-wheel drive was also discontinued in some markets. The vinyl woodgrain-appearance side paneling was no longer available, as the new side sheet metal was no longer flat.

Third generation Voyagers introduced a new system of rear seats to simplify installation, removal, and re-positioning— marketed as "Easy-Out Roller Seats". All Voyagers and Grand Voyagers were equipped with this feature. When installed, the second- and third-row seats (either bucket or bench seats) are latched to floor-mounted strikers. When unlatched, eight rollers lifted each seat, allowing it to be rolled fore and aft. Tracks had locator depressions for rollers, thus enabling simple installation. Ergonomic levers at the seatbacks released the floor latches single-handedly without tools and raised the seats onto the rollers in a single motion. Additionally, seatbacks were designed to fold forward. Seat roller tracks were permanently attached to the floor and seat stanchions were aligned, facilitating the longitudinal rolling of the seats. Bench seat stanchions were relocated inboard to reduce bending stress in the seat frames and allowing them to be lighter.

=== Engines ===
- 1996–2000 2.4 L EDZ I4, 150 hp (112 kW), 167 lb⋅ft (226 N⋅m) (Canadian vans beginning in 1999 included a 3.0 L V6 as standard equipment)
- 1996–2000 3.0 L Mitsubishi 6G72 V6 150 hp (112 kW), 176 lb⋅ft (239 N⋅m) (not available in certain U.S. states, 3.3 L V6 offered as standard equipment in those states instead)
- 1996–2000 3.3 L EGA V6, 158 hp (118 kW), 203 lb⋅ft (275 N⋅m)
- 1996–1997 3.8 L EGH V6, 166 hp (124 kW), 227 lb⋅ft (308 N⋅m)
- 1998–1999 3.8 L EGH V6, 180 hp (134 kW), 240 lb⋅ft (325 N⋅m)

=== 1996 ===
- As running changes during this model year, the Pentastar front logo and rear badging carried over from the previous generation were replaced with the new "sailboat" logo and script font, while the front interior door panels were redesigned, losing the discrete grab handles in favor of ones integrated into the armrests. Another running change saw the elimination of the plastic intake manifold cover from the 3.8 L engine.
- The base engine is now the 2.4 L DACT engine with 150 hp.
- Optional rear sliding doors.

=== 1997 ===
- A CD player was a new option. Other than that, only minimal changes.

=== 1998 ===
- Grocery bag hooks were added to the rearmost bench. The Rallye package was renamed Expresso and now included new wheel covers (if equipped with steel wheels), a standard CD player, and a body-colored grille). SE models with optional low-back seats and LE models received updated cloth upholstery. As a running change during this model year, the HVAC vents on the driver's side and in the center of the dashboard were changed to a more conventional design.

=== 1999 ===
- The 3.8 L V6 was available for front-wheel drive SE models. A small cargo net between the front seats, additional standard equipment, integrated child-safety seats, and second-row buckets were added to the Voyager this year. Air conditioning was made standard on SE models. In Canada, the 3.0 L V6 was made standard equipment. 1999 also saw the addition of a one-year-only 15th anniversary "Platinum Edition", to mark Caravan's 15th year of production. This package was offered on various trim levels and included Platinum Metallic paint along with fender badges.

=== 2000 ===
- Now standard on all models was air conditioning, power windows, and power locks (the latter two standard on SE models only). A dealer-installed rear-seat video entertainment system was newly available on all models. The 2000 model year offered packages that included the "2000+" and "Millennium" packages. These only added unique fender badges on vans with popular equipment. As Chrysler withdrew the Plymouth brand, the Voyager was marketed by both Chrysler and Plymouth during this model year.

=== Crash test results ===
The 1996-2000 Dodge Grand Caravan (twin of the Voyager/Grand Voyager) received a "Marginal" rating in the Insurance Institute for Highway Safety's 40 mph offset test. The structural performance and restraints were graded "Acceptable", but the foot injuries were very high.

In the NHTSA crash tests, it received 4 stars for the driver and front passenger in the frontal impact. In the side-impact test, it received 5 stars for the driver, and 3 stars for the rear occupant, and resulted in a fuel leak that could cause a fire hazard.

== Discontinuation ==
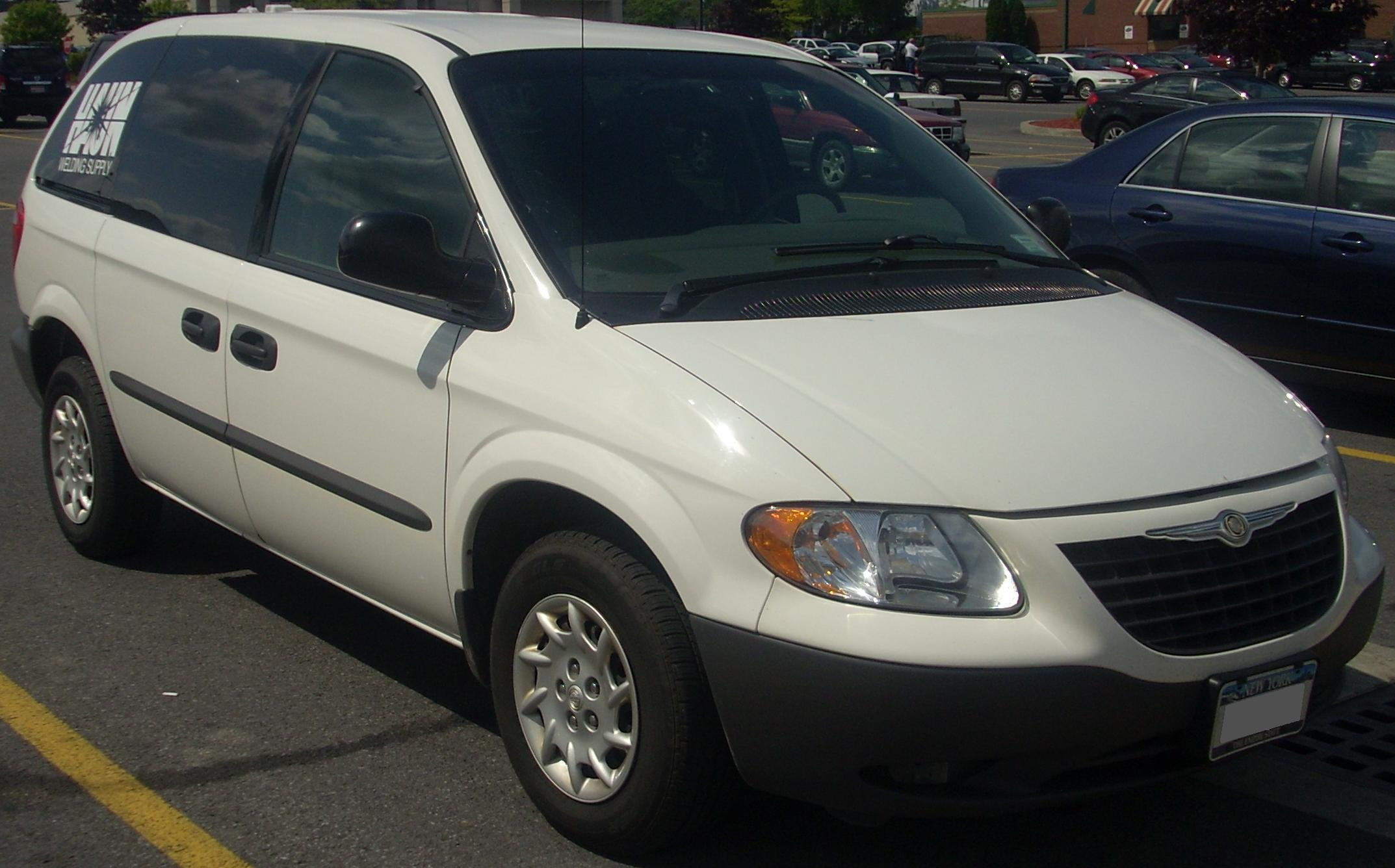
'02-'03 Chrysler Voyager

Following the retirement of the Plymouth brand after the 2000 model year, the Voyager nameplate was continued by the Chrysler division. While used by all exported Chrysler minivans since 1988, in North America, the Chrysler Voyager served as the lowest-trim Chrysler-brand minivan. Offered only in a short-wheelbase configuration, the Voyager continued with matte-black bumpers and exterior trim. Following the 2001 introduction of the RS-generation minivans, the Voyager was distinguished by a winged Chrysler emblem atop a black plastic grille (a shape adopted by the later PT Cruiser).

For 2004, Chrysler discontinued the Voyager in the United States and Canada, replacing the model line with the Dodge Caravan and a short-wheelbase Town & Country (the Voyager remained in Mexico through 2007). In markets outside of North America, the nameplate remained in use through 2016 for all export versions (as both a Chrysler and a Lancia).

After skipping the 2008-2020 fifth generation, the Voyager nameplate returned to use in North America for 2020 production, slotted below the Chrysler Pacifica and effectively replacing the Dodge Grand Caravan.

== Trim levels ==
- Base – 1984–2000
- LE – 1984–1995 (unavailable in the US for the third generation; replaced by standalone Rallye and Expresso models)
- SE – 1984–2000
- LX – 1989–1992
- Sport Wagon – 1993–1995 (package available on SE and LE)
- Rallye – 1995–1997 (1995 as a package on SE and LE; 1996–1997 as either a package on SE or a standalone model)
- Expresso – 1998–2000 (as a package on SE or standalone model)
