= Chrysler minivans (S) =

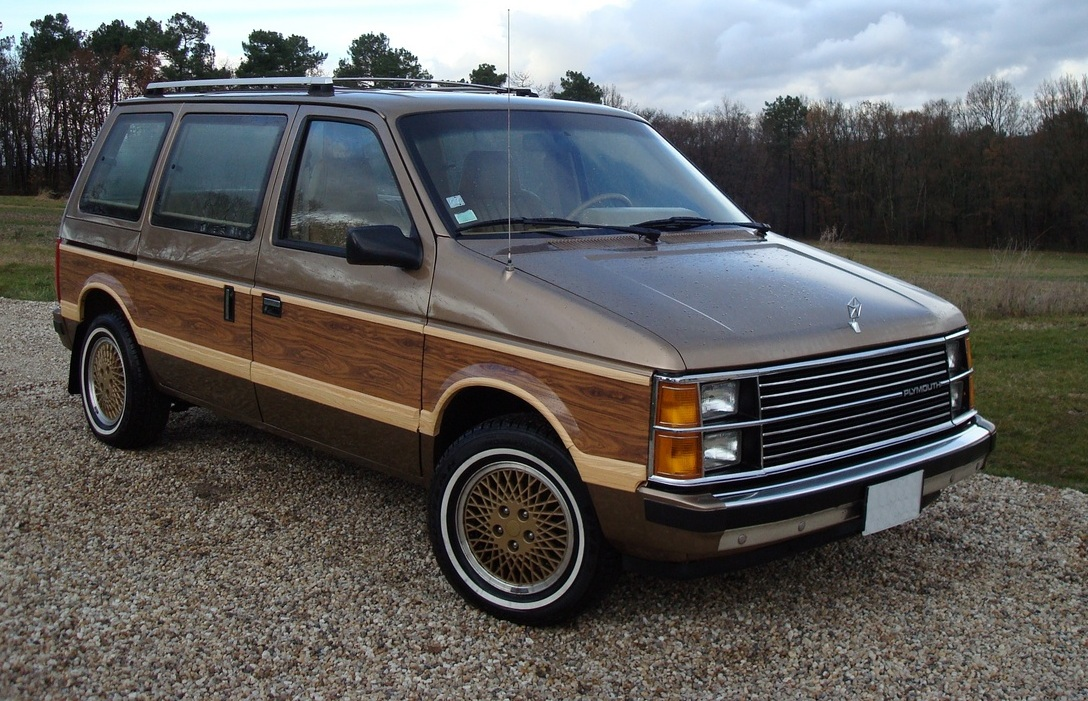
- 1986 Plymouth Voyager LE

Overview
- Manufacturer: Chrysler Corporation
- Also called: Chrysler T-115 platform
- Production: November 2, 1983 – 1990
- Assembly: Canada: Windsor, Ontario (Windsor Assembly); United States: Fenton, Missouri (St. Louis North Assembly Plant: 1987 onward)

Body and chassis
- Class: Minivan (M)
- Layout: FF layout
- Body style: 4-door van (1 sliding door)
- Vehicles: Dodge Caravan; Plymouth Voyager; Chrysler Voyager (export); Chrysler Town & Country

Chronology
- Successor: Chrysler minivans (AS)

The first-generation Chrysler minivans are a series of minivans produced and marketed by Chrysler Corporation from the 1984 to the 1990 model years. Introduced as the first minivans from an American manufacturer and popularizing the minivan as a vehicle, the Dodge Caravan and Plymouth Voyager were launched ahead of chief competitors Chevrolet Astro/GMC Safari and Ford Aerostar.

Using the front-wheel drive Chrysler S platform, the minivans were produced in both passenger and cargo configurations. Initially offered in a single wheelbase, a longer-wheelbase Grand Caravan/Grand Voyager was introduced for 1987. For 1988, the Chrysler Voyager was introduced for export sale (mainly to Europe), intended as a competitor for the Renault Espace. For the final year of the generation, the luxury-oriented Chrysler Town & Country was introduced.

Chrysler manufactured the S-platform minivans in the United States and Canada in its Saint Louis Assembly (Fenton, Missouri) and Windsor Assembly (Windsor, Ontario) facilities.

== Background and development ==
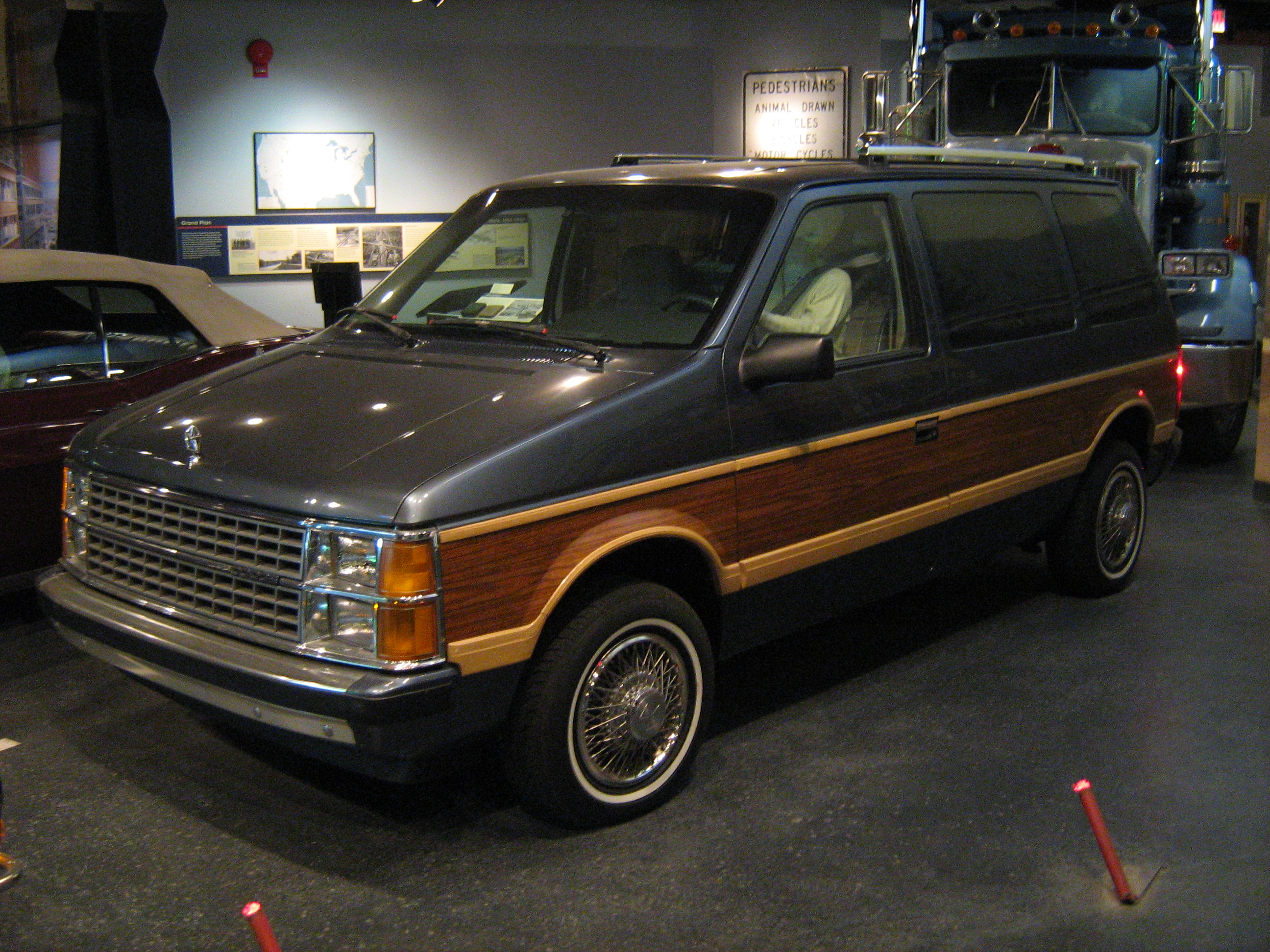
A 1986 Dodge Caravan at the Smithsonian National Museum of American History

The development of what ultimately became the Chrysler minivans began in the early 1970s as concurrent projects of Ford Motor Company and the truck division of Dodge. As an alternative to Volkswagen Microbus, both companies sought to create a "garageable van", more powerful, safer-handling vans capable as a practical second car.

In 1964, when Chrysler adopted three platforms for all products called the C, B, and A, Chrysler also introduced the Dodge A100 cab-over van in response to the first generation Ford Econoline, Chevrolet Van and Chevy Corvair Greenbrier.

The Dodge van project did not progress past a clay model design. Chrysler chairman Lynn Townsend argued that if a market for such a vehicle existed, Ford and General Motors would have already done it. In 1973, Ford developed the Ford Carousel as a running prototype; derived from the Ford Club Wagon (itself in development), the Carousel adopted a lower "garageable" roofline and "automotive-style" interior and exterior features. While supported by multiple Ford executives, the Carousel fell victim to the 1973 oil crisis, as the company focused development resources on redesigning its sedan lines.

At the end of 1977, development of Chrysler minivans restarted with four main goals; 1982 was planned for a potential model year launch.

1. The ability to park in a standard-size garage
2. Car-like NVH
3. Low, flat load floor
4. Removable rear seats (ability to carry a 4×8 sheet of building material on the floor)

Although both the front-wheel drive K-Cars and L-body (Omni/Horizon) were being considered as donor platforms, Chrysler also allowed consideration of rear-wheel drive. Ultimately, the L-body was ruled out, as it was considered too light-duty for either the size of the vehicle or its planned six-cylinder engine. During 1978, Chrysler began research across the United States, seeking what features customers desired in a potential minivan, finding agreement in its planned goals. Though potential customers found concept sketches "ugly", Chrysler still found a potential market of nearly 1 million vehicles per year, with Chrysler selling 215,000 of them.

In 1978, both Lee Iacocca and Hal Sperlich were fired from Ford, moving to similar positions within Chrysler Corporation. The same year, Chrysler Corporation merged the truck engineering division of Dodge within its car counterpart of Chrysler. By 1979, Chrysler chose front-wheel drive for the minivan project, codenamed "T-115". Though the van would share its transverse engine and transmission with the K-cars, it would be based on a separate body structure. Approved by Lee Iacocca at the end of 1979, the T-115 project would cost $500 million to produce, funded as part of the $1.5 billion in federal loan guarantees given to Chrysler.

From its 1979 approval to its 1984 launch, the proposed T-115 design would undergo several major changes. Originally intended to use four sedan-style doors (similar to a station wagon), Chrysler changed to two sliding doors for the rear, claiming better parking-lot access. The configuration was ultimately changed to a single sliding door, as Chrysler wanted to market the van to commercial buyers. While engineers wanted to make a left-side sliding door an option, its deletion was done to reduce production costs. During development, the configuration of the rear door was also contentious; initially favoring a tailgate, designers shifted to a liftgate (a design also used by the K-Car wagons). On the exterior, the side windows were redesigned to become flush with the body in 1981; while requiring a major redesign of components and tooling, the design change allowed for a reduction of wind noise and drag. To further reduce costs, a number of visible interior components were shared with the Dodge Aries/Plymouth Reliant, including the instrument panel, interior controls, radio, and various trim items.

Drivetrain choices proved problematic as the 2.2L I4 of the K-cars was considered inadequate; the 3.7L Slant Six was unsuited for transverse mounting. The Mitsubishi-sourced 2.6L I4 was adopted as an interim engine until 1987 when Chrysler dropped it in favor of a Mitsubishi-sourced 3.0L V6. The Chrysler V6 engine was eventually introduced for the model line in 1989, choosing not to use the 238.2 cu in (3.9 L) Chrysler LA 239 V6 engine.

== Overview ==
Launched in November 1983 for the 1984 model year, Chrysler marketed the first-generation minivans as the Dodge Caravan and Plymouth Voyager, along with the Mini Ram Van cargo van. While the Dodge Caravan nameplate was all-new, the Voyager nameplate had been in use since 1974, marketed as the Plymouth equivalent of the Dodge Sportsman full-size passenger van.

Initially released in a single 112-inch wheelbase, a 119-inch long-wheelbase Grand Caravan/Grand Voyager was introduced for the 1987 model year. Chrysler began marketing minivans under its own brand starting in 1988, with the Chrysler Voyager introduced for export sale; the Chrysler Town & Country was introduced for 1990, serving as one of the first luxury-oriented minivans.

=== Body ===
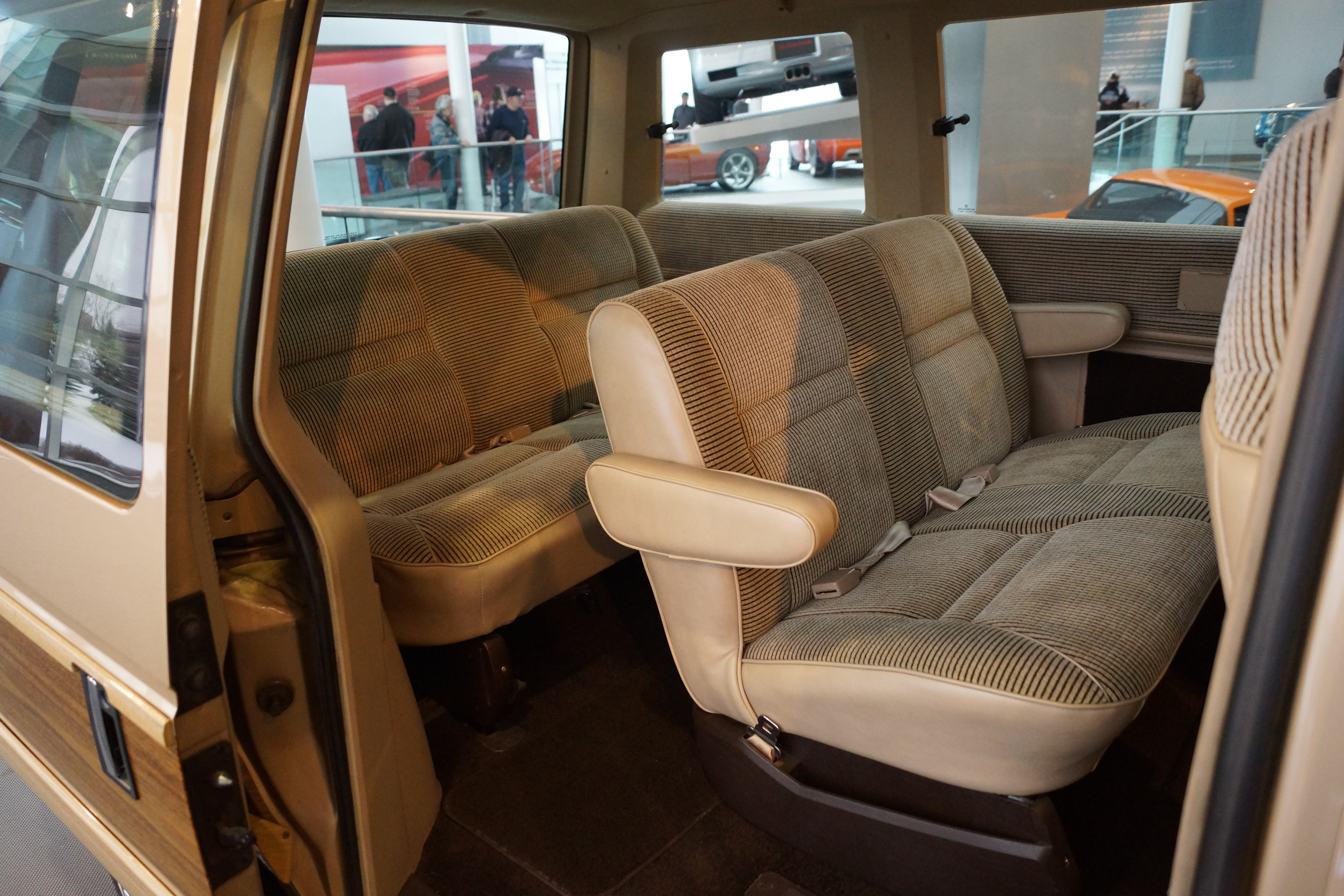
LE-trim Chrysler minivan rear seats (1984-1986)

Designed as an alternative to full-size station wagons, the standard-length Dodge Caravan/Plymouth Voyager (two inches shorter and two inches wider than a K-car station wagon), presented nearly double the cargo space of a K-car station wagon with a 7-foot long cargo floor. Similar to the K-car station wagons, the minivans use a liftgate rear door (supported by gas struts), unlocked by key.

Several seating configurations were offered, depending on trim level. The standard configuration of five-passenger seating in two rows was included with seven or eight-passenger seating in three rows; the back two seats were two-passenger and three-passenger bench seats (in the style of a larger van, these latched to the floor). The more popular two-passenger configuration was offered in several configurations, with low-back seats (as the minivan was technically a light truck), or high back seats with headrests; depending on trim level, seats could have vinyl, "deluxe" cloth or vinyl, or "luxury" cloth/vinyl upholstery. Two styles of rear seats were offered. The three-passenger rear bench was adjustable for passenger legroom or cargo space; the seatback also folded down when not in use. In 1985, a five-passenger version was introduced with a fold-flat rear seat; called "Convert-a-bed", the option allowed the rear seat to fold backwards into a bed. The Convert-a-bed was also available paired with the front bench seat.

To lower production and development costs of the Chrysler minivans, the vehicles maintained a high degree of visible parts commonality with other Chrysler vehicles, sharing wheel covers, door handles, instrument panels, and other visible trim pieces with the Aries/Reliant and other Chrysler vehicles. As the design of the dashboard precluded a conventional glove box, Chrysler added a large storage drawer underneath the passenger seat (a feature retained in later generations of Chrysler minivans and the Chrysler PT Cruiser). The minivans also became some of the earliest mass produced automobiles to feature dedicated cup holders that were outside of the glovebox from the factory.

=== 1984–1986 ===
At their 1984 launch, the Dodge Caravan and Plymouth Voyager followed suit with the K-cars, with the two model lines being externally distinguished primarily by their grille design; both were fitted with vertically-stacked headlamps. The Caravan was styled with an eggcrate grille with the Voyager receiving a grille with horizontally-oriented trim. In a styling feature exclusive to the first two generations of the Chrysler minivans, top-trim examples of the model line both offered simulated woodgrain paneling as an option.

In following with many other Chrysler vehicles, the Caravan/Voyager shifted from 4-lug to 5-lug wheels for 1986. To reduce high-speed wind noise, Chrysler added a bumper-mounted air dam.

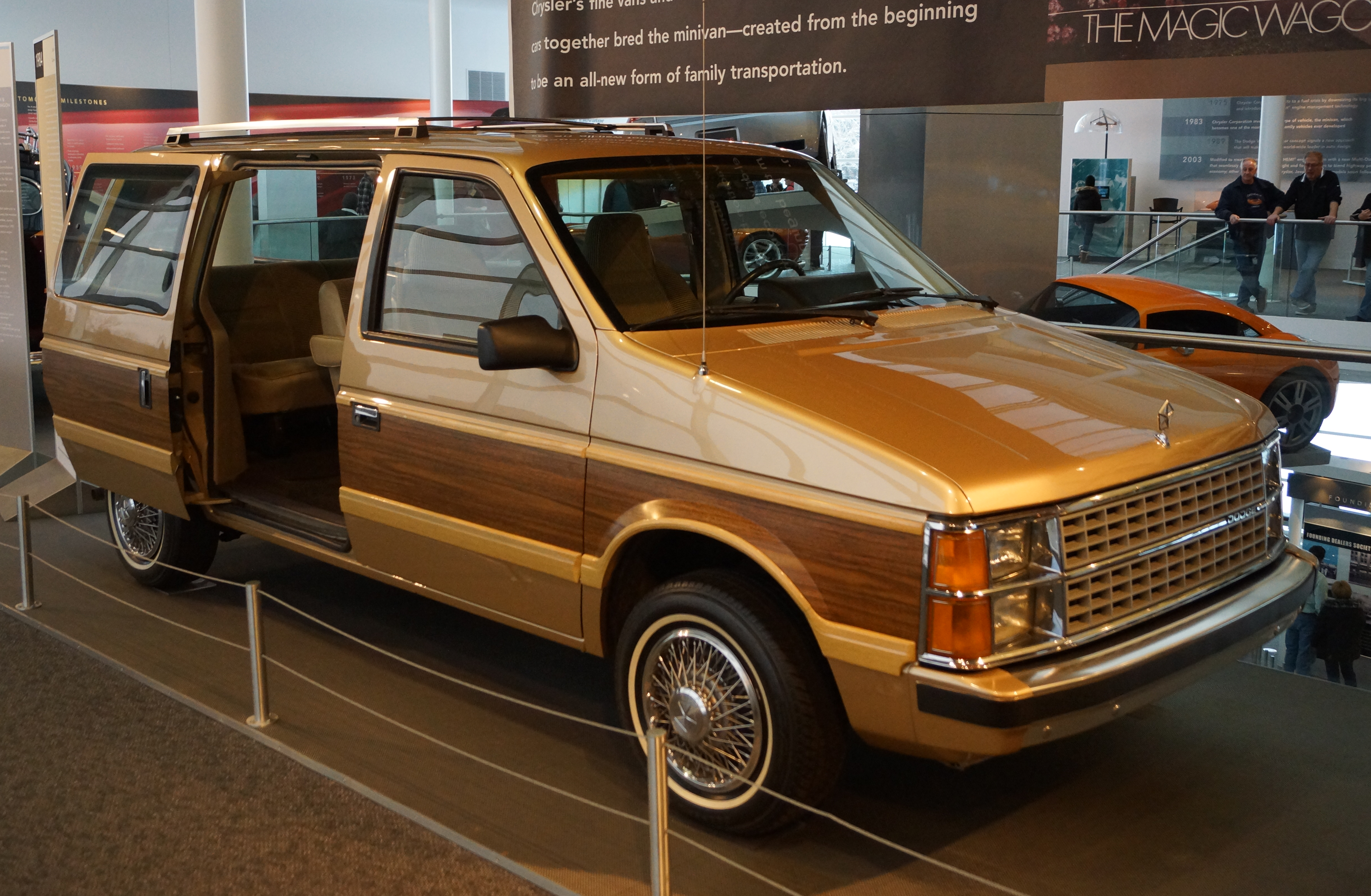
1984 Dodge Caravan LE at the Walter P. Chrysler Museum

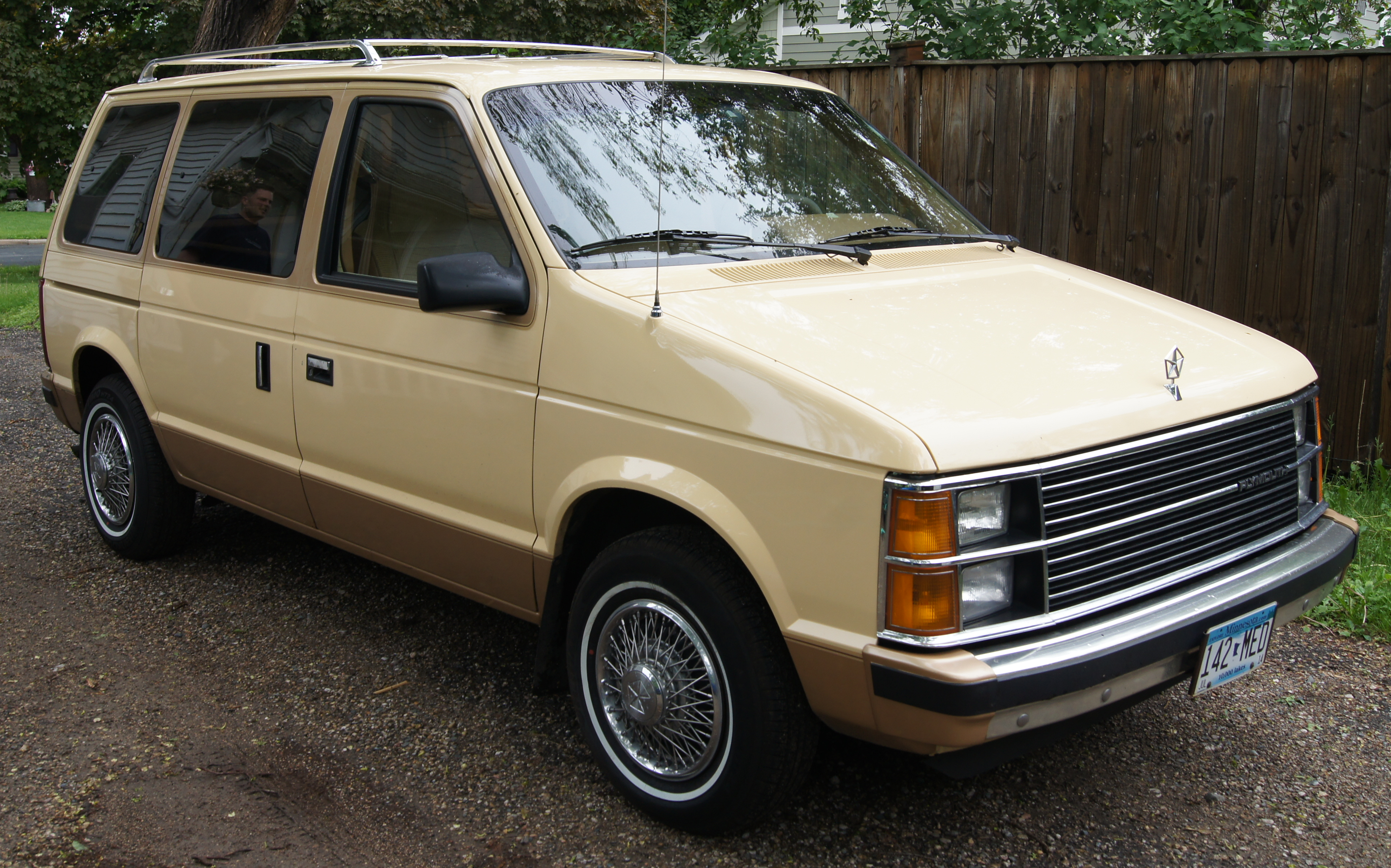
1984-1985 Plymouth Voyager LE

=== 1987–1990 ===
The 1987 model year saw a mid-cycle update to the S-platform minivans, largely alongside the May 1987 release of the extended-wheelbase Grand Caravan and Grand Voyager. Adding seven inches of wheelbase and fourteen inches of length, the two "Grand" minivans were the largest vehicles in the segment in North America for 1987. With both rear seats removed, the Grand Caravan/Voyager offered 150 cubic feet of cargo room, 25 extra than a standard wheelbase Chrysler minivan. The Caravan/Voyager were restyled slightly, as different grilles better distinguished the two model lines; with the exception of the Mini Ram Van, all versions were fitted with flush-lens composite headlamps.

While the long-wheelbase "Grand" configuration would go on to become the most popular configuration, the seldom-ordered front bench seat and Convert-A-Bed options were discontinued for 1987. The interior trim underwent several upgrades; along with the deletion of low-back bucket seats, "deluxe" vinyl became the standard upholstery on base and SE trims; leather seating was introduced as an option for LE trims.

The drivetrain saw several updates, with Chrysler dropping carbureted engines; the Mitsubishi inline-4 was replaced by a Chrysler-designed 2.5L engine, with the model line receiving an optional V6 engine for the first time (standard on long-wheelbase versions).

For 1989, the minivans saw a minor update to the exterior and interior. To improve fit and finish quality, Chrysler redesigned the front and rear bumpers with single-piece bumper covers (painted to match the color of the body). While the rest of the interior remained largely unchanged, the steering column traded its early-1980s K-Car steering wheel for a 3-spoke unit. Three flagship trims were introduced, with Chrysler adding the standard-wheelbase Dodge Caravan ES and Plymouth Voyager LX; as an early 1990 model, Chrysler added a minivan to its namesake brand, introducing the extended-wheelbase Town & Country (after serving as the Chrysler station wagon since 1951).

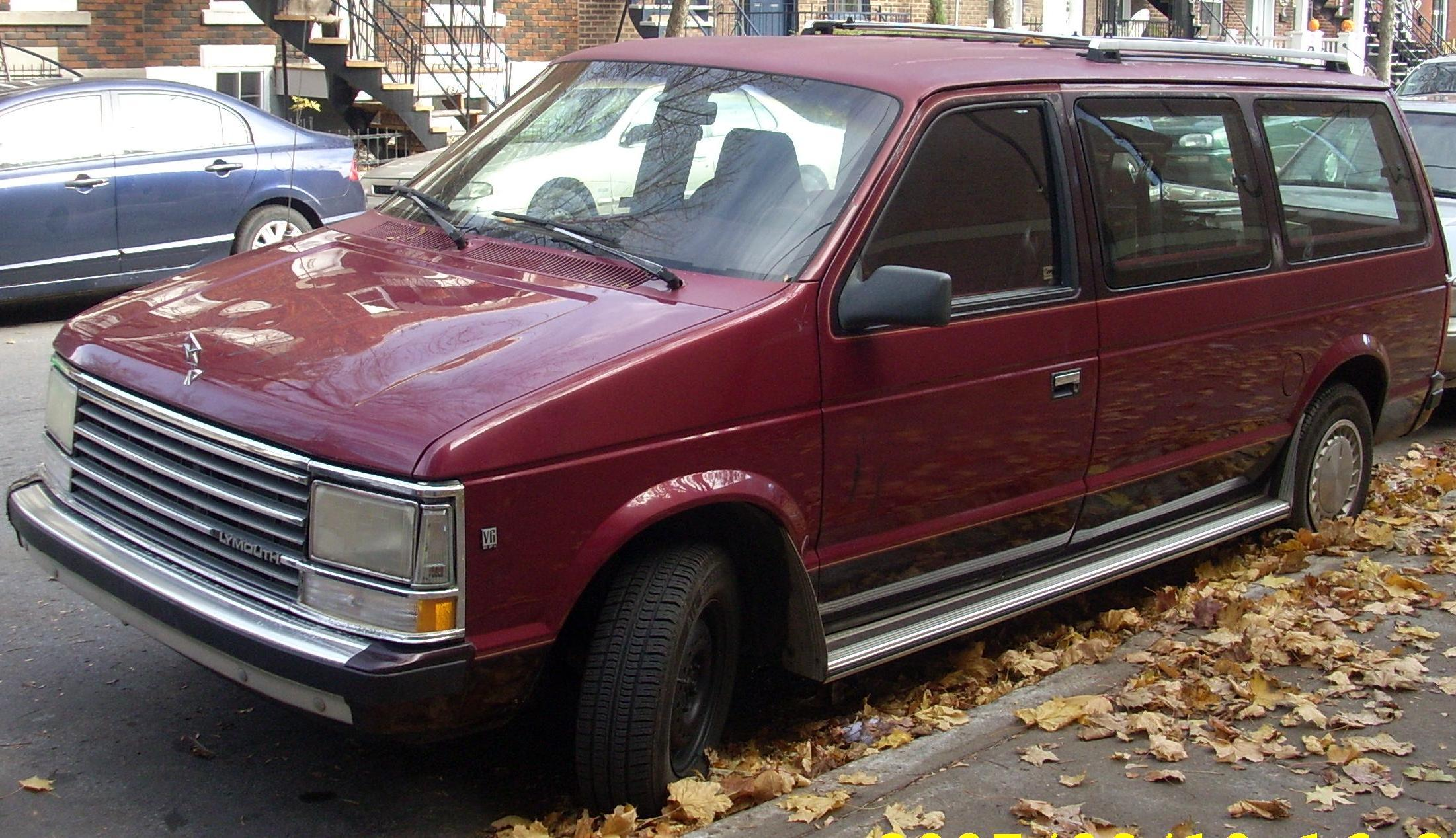
1987–1988 Plymouth Grand Voyager SE V6

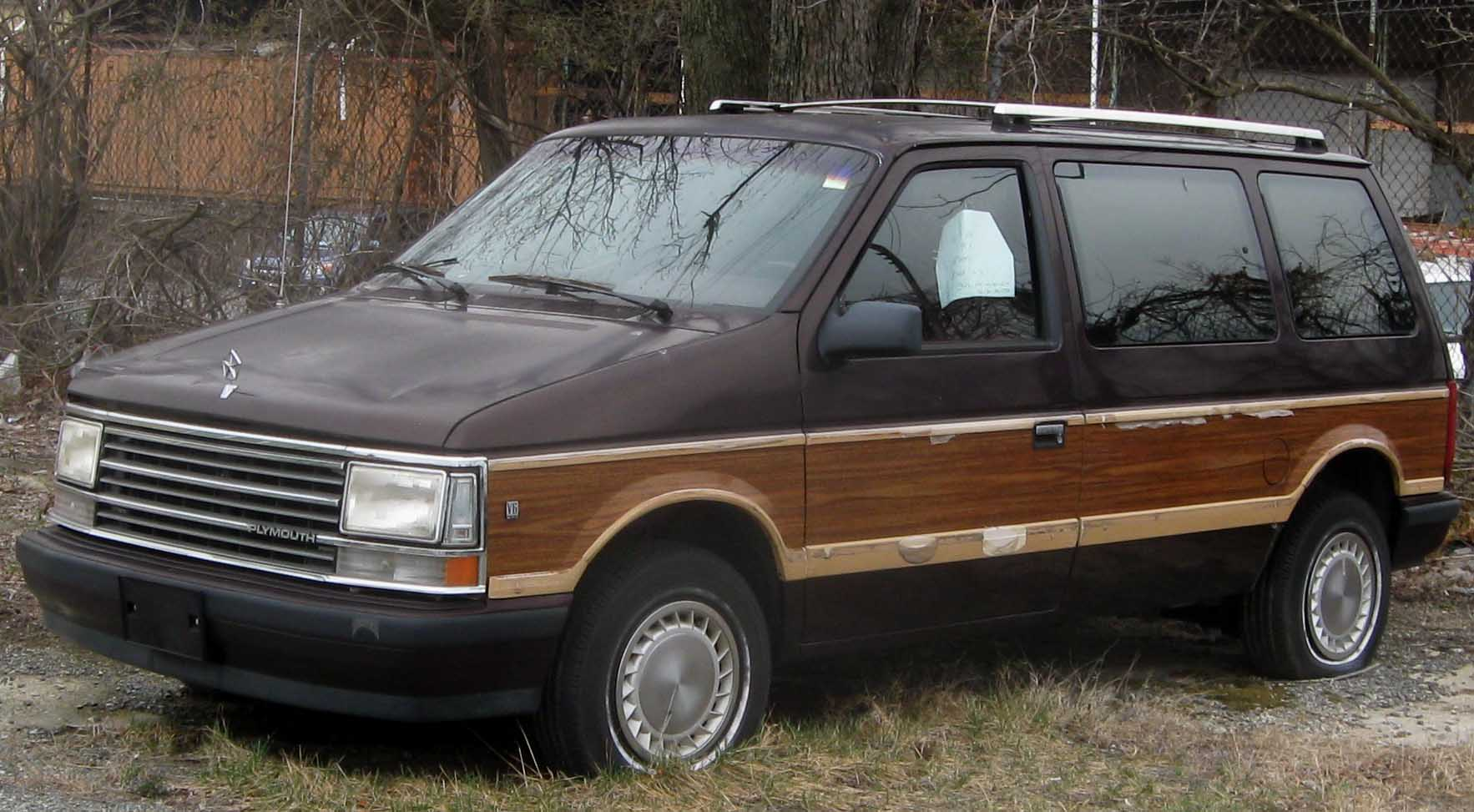
1990 Plymouth Voyager LE V6

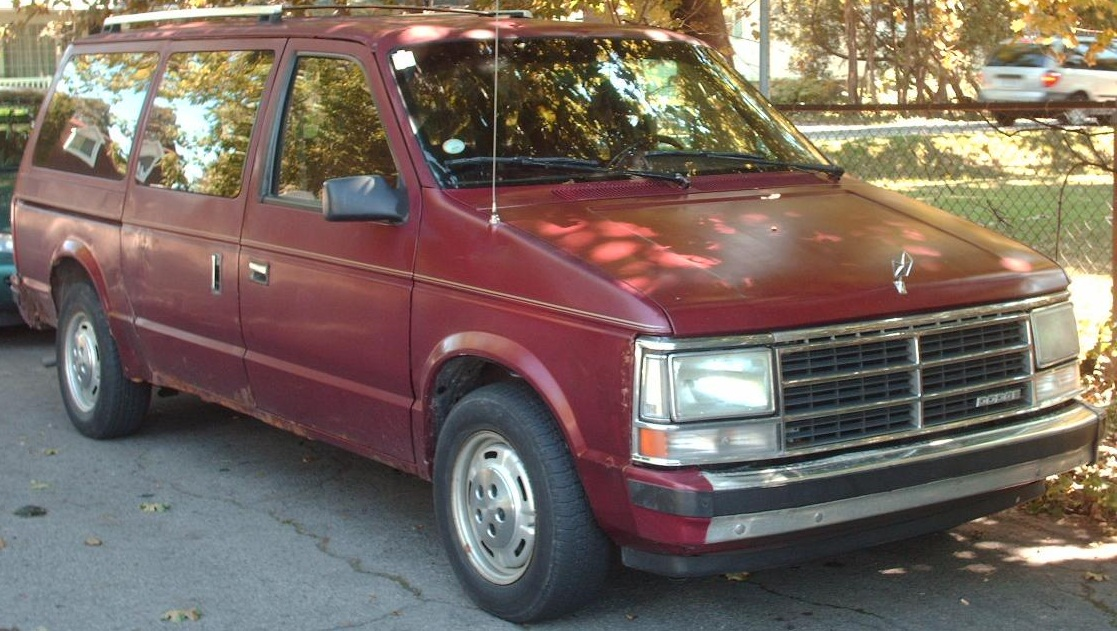
1987–1988 Dodge Caravan

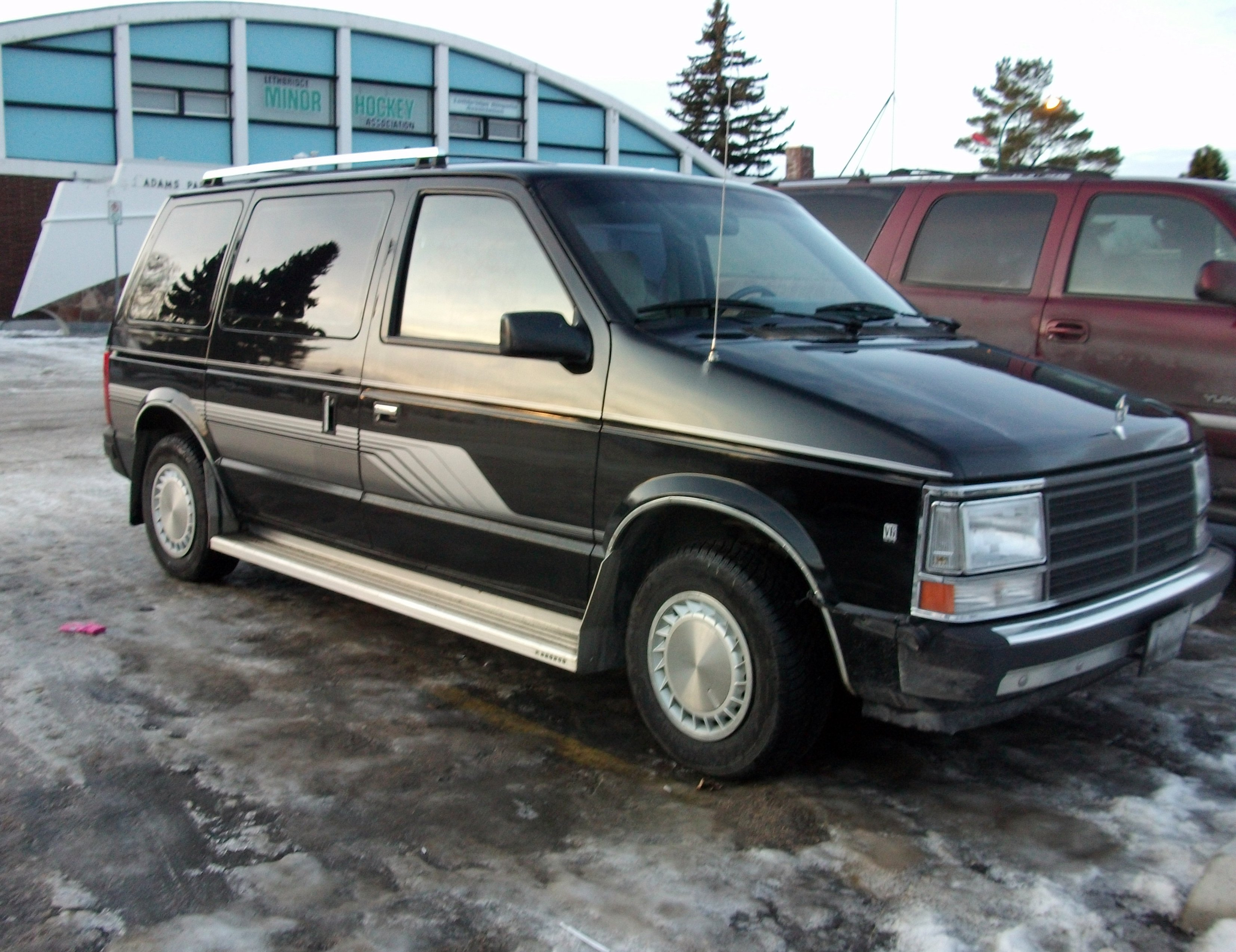
1987–1988 Dodge Caravan SE V6

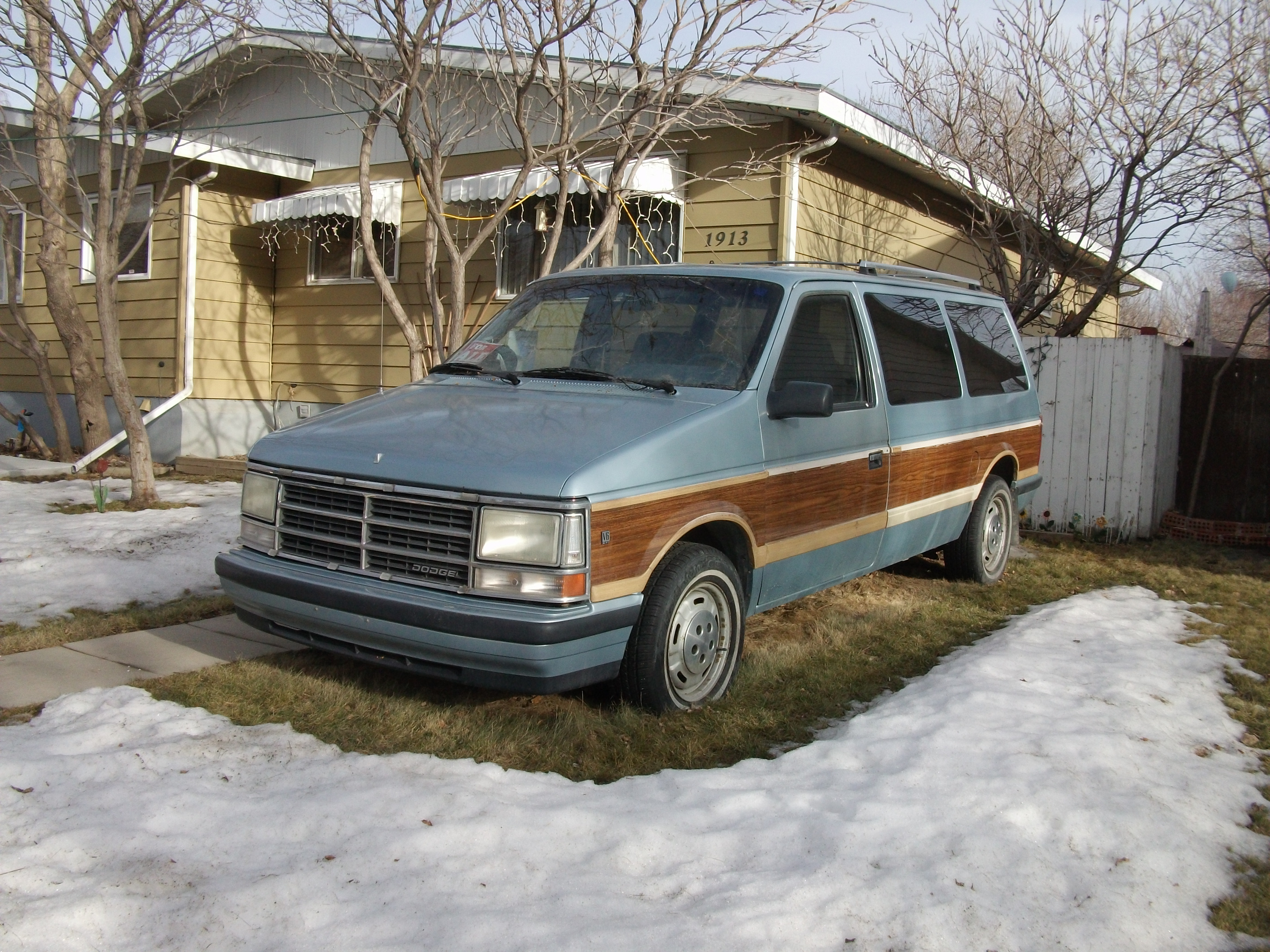
1989–1990 Dodge Grand Caravan LE V6

=== Chassis ===
The first-generation Chrysler minivans are based upon the Chrysler S platform, using unibody construction. Contrary to popular belief, the S platform is not directly related to the K platform; though sharing powertrains to lower development and production costs, the S platform has a distinct body structure, allowing for a higher hoodline and seat height. The S platform is produced in two wheelbases: 112.1 inches for standard-length minivans; 119.1 inches for "Grand"-length minivans.

Adapting the layout of the K platform for a larger vehicle, the S-platform vans were fitted with MacPherson strut front suspension and a beam rear axle with leaf springs. All S-platform minivans are fitted with front disc and rear drum brakes.

==== Engines ====
For the first three years of production, two engines were offered – both inline-4 engines with two-barrel carburetors. The base 2.2 L was borrowed from the Chrysler K-cars, and produced 96 hp (72 kW) horsepower. The higher performance fuel-injected version of the 2.2 L engine later offered in the K-cars was never offered in the Caravan, and the 2-bbl version would remain the base power plant until mid-1987. Alongside the 2.2 L, an optional Mitsubishi 2.6 L engine was available, producing 104 hp (78 kW).

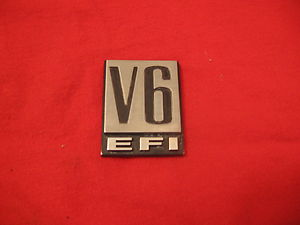
Fender badge originally used on V6 equipped minivans

In mid-1987, the base 2.2 L inline-four engine was replaced with a fuel-injected 2.5 L inline-four, which produced 100 hp (75 kW), while the Mitsubishi G54B I4 was replaced with a new fuel-injected 3.0 L Mitsubishi V6 producing 136 hp (101 kW) in March of that year.

Shortly thereafter, in model year 1989, a more powerful engine became optional: a turbocharged version of the 2.5 L I4 producing 150 hp (112 kW). Revisions to the Mitsubishi V6 increased its output to 142 hp (106 kW), and a new 150 hp (112 kW) 3.3 L V6 was added to the option list in model year 1990. The V6 engines became popular as sales of the 2.5 turbo dwindled, and it was dropped at the end of the year.

Neither the 3.3 L V6 engine nor the turbocharged four were available on the European Chrysler Voyager. The Chrysler Town & Country was only available with one engine option, the Mitsubishi 3.0 L V6, which was later upgraded to the newly introduced 3.3 L V6 during its production run.

Chrysler S platform engine details
Engine name	Production	Configuration	Fuel system	Output	
Engine name	Production	Configuration	Fuel system	Horsepower	Torque
Chrysler K	1984–1987	2.2 L (135 cu in) SOHC inline-4	2-bbl carburetor	96 hp (72 kW)	119 lb⋅ft (161 N⋅m)
Chrysler K	1987½–1990	2.5 L (153 cu in) SOHC inline-4	Single-point fuel injection	100 hp (75 kW)	135 lb⋅ft (183 N⋅m)
Chrysler Turbo I	1989–1990	2.5 L (153 cu in) SOHC inline-4, single turbocharger	Multi-point fuel injection	150 hp (112 kW)	180 lb⋅ft (244 N⋅m)
Mitsubishi G54B	1984–1987	2.6 L (156 cu in) SOHC inline-4	2-bbl carburetor	104 hp (78 kW)	142 lb⋅ft (193 N⋅m)
Mitsubishi 6G72	1987½–1990	3.0 L (181 cu in) SOHC V6	Multiport fuel injection	1987½–1988: 136 hp (101 kW)	168 lb⋅ft (228 N⋅m)
Mitsubishi 6G72	1987½–1990	3.0 L (181 cu in) SOHC V6	Multiport fuel injection	1989–1990: 142 hp (106 kW)	173 lb⋅ft (235 N⋅m)
Chrysler EGA	1990	3.3 L (201 cu in) OHV V6	Multiport fuel injection	150 hp (112 kW)	180 lb⋅ft (244 N⋅m)

==== Transmissions ====
Both a three-speed TorqueFlite A413 automatic transmission and a five-speed manual were available with most inline-4 engines, including the turbocharged 2.5 L (this was a rare combination). Manual transmissions were not available on 2.6 L Mitsubishi 4-cylinder models nor V6 models of the passenger Caravan, but were an option on the Mini Ram Van and Caravan C/V's long wheelbase models with a 3.0 L V6.

V6 engines were only offered with the fully hydraulically operated TorqueFlite until the computer controlled Ultradrive 4-speed automatic became available in 1989. The Ultradrive offered much better fuel economy and responsiveness, particularly when paired with the inline-4 engine. However, it suffered from reliability problems, usually stemming from what is known as "gear hunt" or "shift busyness", resulting in premature wear of the internal clutches. It also required an uncommon type of automatic transmission fluid and is not clearly labeled as such, leading many owners to use the more common Dexron II rather than the specified "Mopar ATF+3", resulting in transmission damage and eventual failure.

The Ultradrive received numerous design changes in subsequent model years to improve reliability, and many early model transmissions would eventually be retrofitted or replaced with the updated versions by dealers, under warranty. These efforts were mostly successful, and most first-generation Caravans eventually got an updated transmission.

=== Trim ===
The S-platform Dodge Caravan and Plymouth Voyager were both offered in three trim levels, an unnamed base trim level, mid-range SE, and top-range LE; LE-trim minivans were marketed with the option of simulated woodgrain paneling. In 1989, as part of a minor exterior update, Dodge and Plymouth each gained an additional trim level for the top of the model range, the Dodge Caravan ES and Plymouth Voyager LX, available only in standard-wheelbase configuration. The Chrysler Town & Country was only offered in a single unnamed trim level.

== Variants ==
=== Cargo van ===
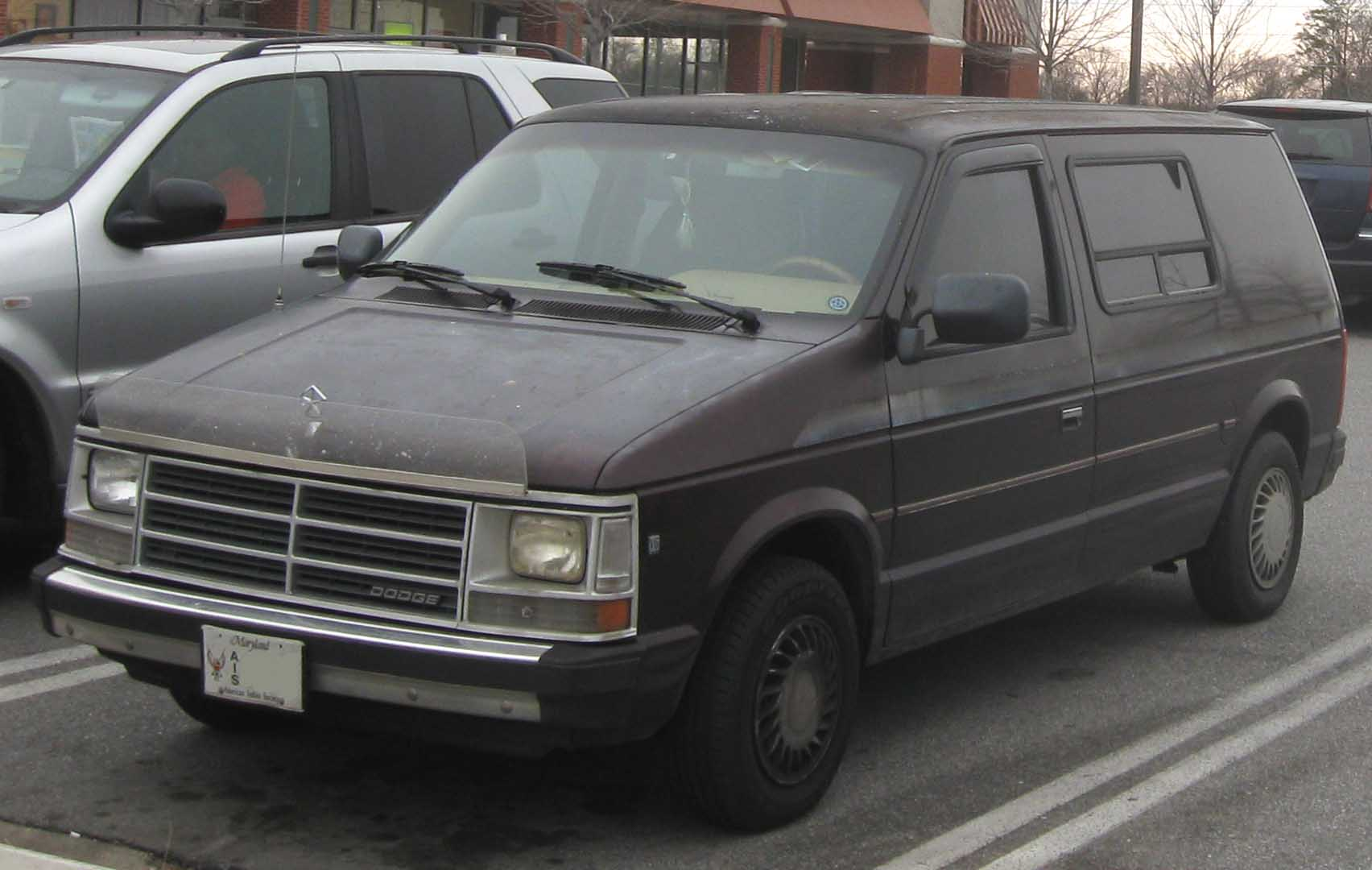
1989-1990 Dodge Caravan C/V

Chrysler produced two cargo van variants of the S platform, both based upon the Dodge Caravan. From 1984 to 1988, Dodge marketed the Mini Ram Van. Distinguished by a "Ram" nameplate under the side-view mirror, the Mini Ram Van was renamed the Caravan C/V (Cargo Van) for 1989. In contrast to passenger vans, the Caravan C/V was fitted with model-specific headlight clusters, using dual sealed-beam headlamps (shared with the export Chrysler Voyager). Several window configurations were available, ranging from either no windows to a full set of windows. Coinciding with the 1987 introduction of the Grand Caravan, cargo van production expanded to both wheelbases.

On the Caravan C/V, in addition to the liftgate rear door, Chrysler offered 50/50 split rear doors (similar to the Chevrolet Astro and traditional cargo vans). Produced as an option, the 50/50 doors were constructed of fiberglass; custom-installed by an outside vendor, the doors were installed between the factory and shipment to a dealer.

As with the larger Dodge Ram Van, the Mini Ram Van and Caravan C/V also served as a basis for conversion vans, sold through Chrysler dealers as well as through converters themselves.

=== Chrysler Voyager (export) ===
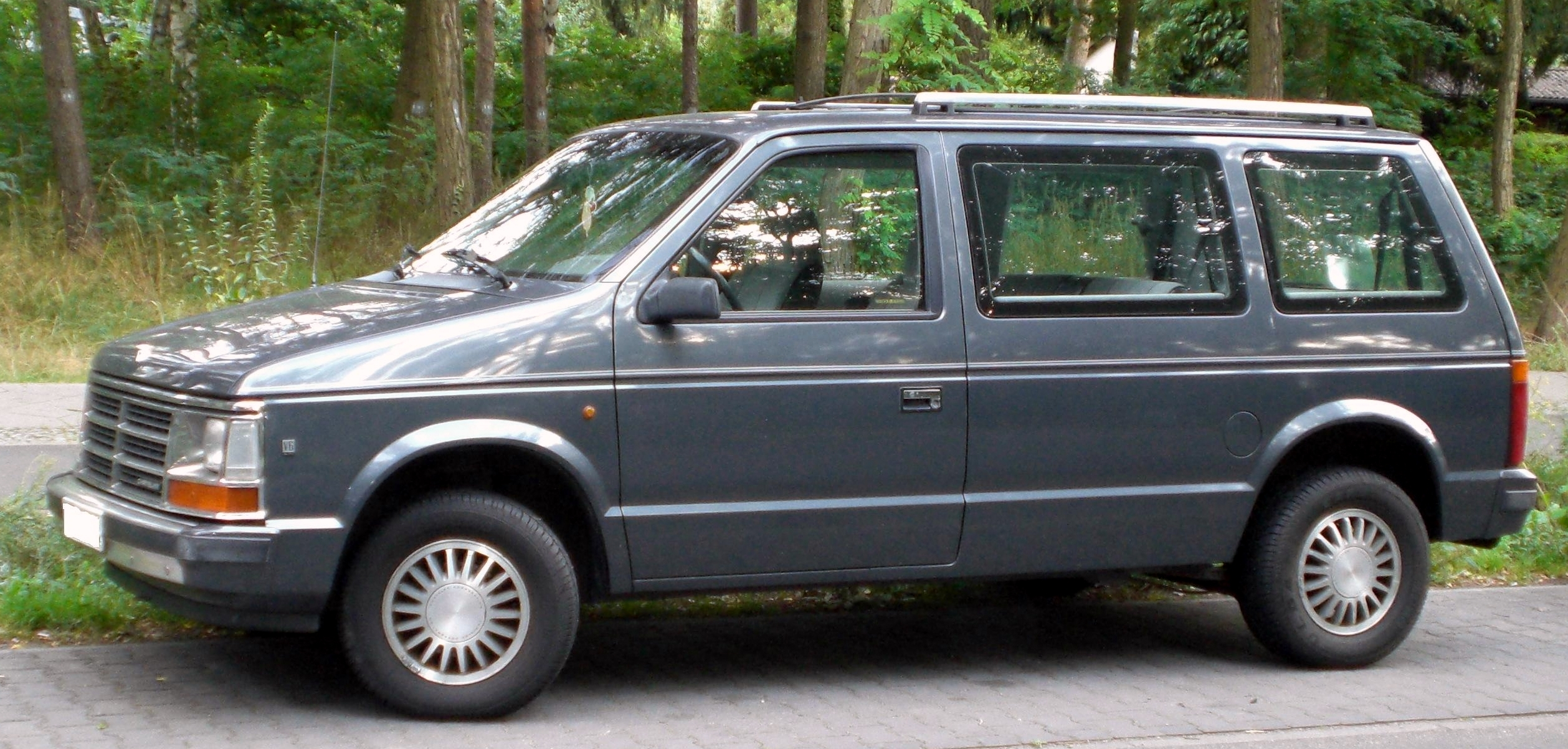
1989-1990 Chrysler Voyager

Starting for the 1988 model year, Chrysler began exports of minivans to Europe. As neither the Plymouth nor the Dodge brands were marketed outside of North America by Chrysler, minivans were exported under the Chrysler Voyager nameplate, competing against the Renault Espace and Volkswagen Transporter/Caravelle (sold as the Vanagon in North America).

While the Voyager name was derived from the Plymouth division, the Chrysler Voyager was a rebranded version of the Dodge Caravan, fitted with the front fascia of the Caravan C/V cargo van. To accommodate the vehicle for European sale, the Chrysler Voyager was fitted with amber turn signal lenses (requiring new taillights), turn signal repeaters, and a model-specific license plate surround (adapted for European license plates and embossed with "Chrysler").

Along with its rebranding, the Chrysler Voyager saw internal modifications, largely to comply with European safety and emissions regulations. With the exception of the turbocharged 2.5 L I4 and 3.3 L V6, the Chrysler Voyager shared its powertrain with its North American counterpart; many examples were produced with manual transmissions.

=== Chrysler Town & Country ===
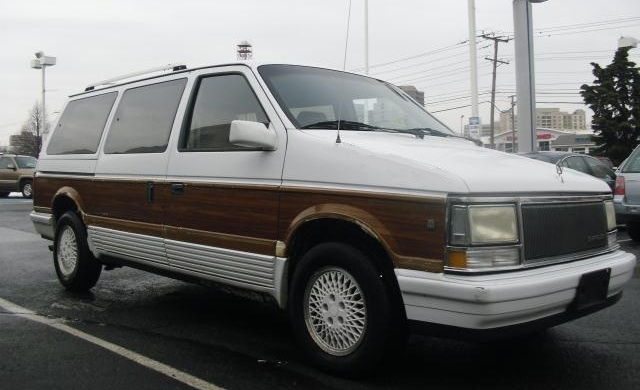
1990 Chrysler Town & Country

After being discontinued in the 1988 model year, the Chrysler Town & Country nameplate was revived as Chrysler released a minivan for its namesake division. Introduced in the spring of the 1989 as an early 1990 model, the Town & Country was released as the highest-trim version of the three Chrysler minivans, sold exclusively in the long-wheelbase body length. Originally slated for a 1989 release, the Town & Country was the first of the three minivans produced as a 1990 model.

Designed as a competitor to luxury-themed minivans such as the Ford Aerostar Eddie Bauer and the (then-upcoming) Oldsmobile Silhouette, the Town & Country included nearly every feature of the Dodge Caravan and Plymouth Voyager as standard equipment, with a number of trim features of its own. All examples were produced with woodgrain trim (a feature associated with the nameplate). Initially, Bright White Clearcoat was the sole color available, with Black Clearcoat added as an option in June 1989 (as 1990 Caravans/Voyagers entered production).

To externally distinguish the Town & Country, Chrysler added a chrome waterfall grille (styled similar to the Chrysler New Yorker), clear-lens turn front turn signals, body-color mirrors, a crystal Pentastar hood ornament (shared with the New Yorker/Fifth Avenue), lower body trim (a monochromatic, long-wheelbase version of the Dodge Caravan ES body trim), and 15" alloy wheels (later used with the Plymouth Voyager LX and other Plymouth models). The interior featured model-specific leather seating, leather interior trim panels, all available power-operated equipment, front and rear air conditioning, and an Infinity II sound system.

Depending on production date, the 1990 Chrysler Town & Country was produced with one of two V6 engines. It was originally fitted with the 142 hp 3.0L Mitsubishi V6 used across Chrysler's model line. This was later upgraded to Chrysler's own 150 hp 3.3L V6 as a running change during production. Although all S-platform Town & Country minivans have 1990 VINs, the EPA classifies examples with the 3.0L V6 as 1989 vehicles. Both engines were paired with the 4-speed Ultradrive automatic transmission.

In total, 5,404 examples of the Chrysler Town & Country were produced, making this variant the rarest of all Chrysler minivans.

== Marketing ==
Early commercials for the 1984 Voyager featured magician Doug Henning as a spokesperson to promote the Voyager "Magic Wagon's" versatility, cargo space, low step-in height, passenger volume, and maneuverability. Later commercials in 1989 featured rock singer Tina Turner. Canadian commercials in 1990 featured pop singer Celine Dion.
