= Ford Carousel =

Overview
- Manufacturer: Ford
- Also called: Ford Carrousel
- Production: 1973 (prototype only)
- Model years: N/A
- Designer: Dick Nesbitt (1972)

Body and chassis
- Class: Prototype; Concept car
- Body style: 3-door minivan
- Layout: FR layout
- Platform: Ford VN platform
- Related: Ford Econoline (1975-1991)

Powertrain
- Engine: 460 cubic inches (7.5 L) V8
- Transmission: 3-speed Ford C6 automatic

Dimensions
- Wheelbase: 124.0 inches (3,149.6 mm)

Chronology
- Successor: Chrysler minivans (indirect); Ford Aerostar (indirect)

The Ford Carousel (also spelled Carrousel) is a prototype vehicle that was developed by Ford in 1973. A derivative of the third-generation Ford Econoline/Club Wagon, the Carousel explored a number of the concepts that 1980s American-market minivans later put into production, serving as an alternative to both full-size station wagons and passenger vans.

Called a "garageable family van", the Carousel featured two-box design (as opposed to the one-box configuration of the Volkswagen Microbus) and three-row forward-facing seating.

Designed and styled by Dick Nesbitt (designer of the Ford Mustang II), the Carousel prototype was built for Ford by Carron & Company of Inkster, Michigan.

== Development ==
In 1972, Ford truck designers had begun final design work on the "Nantucket" design program, the codename for the 1975 Ford Econoline/Club Wagon. While moving its engine several inches forward would increase passenger space significantly, the body height of most versions of the Club Wagon were to be nearly 7 feet tall, having only several inches of clearance through an average garage door opening; the increased size decreased the functionality as a personal vehicle.

In 1972, Lee Iacocca directed the Ford Light Truck design studio to create a "garageable van" derivative of the "Nantucket" program under the "Carousel" codename. Along with lowering the roof of the Club Wagon passenger van approximately one foot (to six feet tall, closer in size to the first-generation Econoline), another design objective of the Carousel program was to give the vehicle more "automotive-like" styling.

For its marketing, "Carousel" was intended for marketing to buyers of full-size station wagons and passenger vans; a production vehicle (a production name is unknown) would have slotted between the Ford LTD Country Squire and the Ford Club Wagon in terms of size and cargo capacity.

== Overview ==
The Ford Carousel derived its chassis from the third-generation Econoline/Club Wagon (then in development) with a 124-inch wheelbase length (the standard wheelbase length for the Econoline from 1975 to 1987). The Carousel was styled with its own body, distinguished by a lower roofline. Lowered to a height of approximately six feet, the Carousel was designed with a height lower than the 6'4" Volkswagen Microbus. The Carousel prototype adopted its powertrain from the Econoline and the Country Squire, using a 460 V8 and Ford C6 3-speed automatic transmission.

The prototype Ford Carousel is a five-passenger vehicle; a flat-folding rear seat (to match the height of the load floor) was developed for the vehicle. As part of its development, several interior configurations were designed, including two rear bench seats and side-facing perimeter seats. To further attract buyers of station wagons, the roofline of the Carousel was styled with glass (in line with the mid-1950s Chevrolet Nomad); the exterior was fitted with simulated woodgrain siding. Similar to a station wagon, the rear door of the Carousel was equipped with a tailgate and retracting rear window. In line with the Club Wagon, the Carousel was equipped with front "captain's chairs".

As a prototype, the Carousel adopted components from other Ford vehicles, including its dashboard from the Thunderbird, interior elements from the LTD Brougham (along with wheelcovers).

== Fate ==
In 1973, the Carousel had been fabricated into a running prototype ready for production approval, potentially for a 1975-1976 launch. While winning the support of Henry Ford II, the Carousel faced internal opposition from other Ford executives, who feared that an unproven vehicle design would have potentially threatened sales of the (highly profitable) Ford LTD Country Squire and Mercury Colony Park.

After the 1973 energy crisis and the recession of the mid-1970s, Ford was forced to cut back on new vehicle development. In 1974, Henry Ford II called for the end of the Carousel program, as it did not replace any existing Ford or Lincoln-Mercury model line.

=== Epilogue ===
In 1978, Lee Iacocca was fired from Ford; several months later, Director of Product Planning Hal Sperlich also left the company. Soon after, both executives were hired in similar roles at Chrysler Corporation. This would lead to the development of the Chrysler minivans for the 1984 model year. While the overall construction of the 1984 Plymouth Voyager and Dodge Caravan would differ greatly from the Ford Carousel (in their basis upon the Chrysler K-car compact sedan), they would follow a similar two-box layout, marketed as family vehicles with smaller garage footprints than full-size station wagons.

At the same time Chrysler commenced minivan production, Ford revisited the idea of a garageable van. In 1984, the company revealed the Ford Aerostar; much like the Carousel, it was a prototype of an intended production vehicle. In mid-1985, the Aerostar commenced sales in production form.

While fuel economy had played a key role in the demise of the Carousel, it would become a major factor behind the design of the Aerostar. In place of the full-size van platform, the Aerostar shared many components with the Ford Ranger light pickup truck. Foregoing the previous two-box design, in a design similar to the European Ford Transit, the Aerostar used a one-box design with the hood and windshield sloped at a similar angle. After the 1997 model year, the Aerostar was discontinued; Ford had largely replaced by 1995 with the Ford Windstar and the Mercury Villager (the latter built in a joint venture with Nissan). The Windstar would largely follow the design set in place by Chrysler, adopting front-wheel drive and unit-body construction based on a car platform.
