= Chrysler minivans (RT) =

Series of American minivans

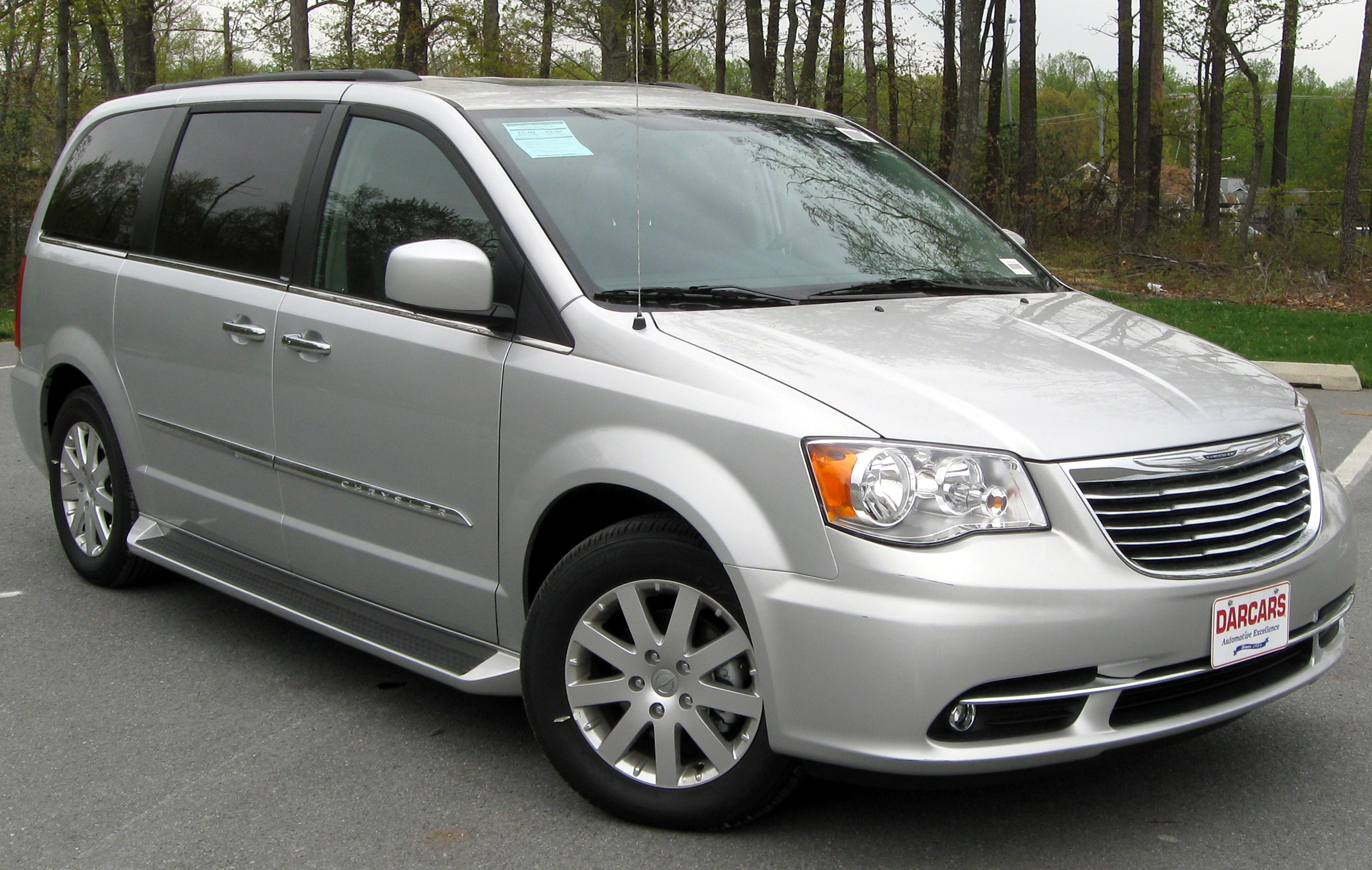

Overview
- Manufacturer: Chrysler LLC (2008–2009); Chrysler Group LLC (2009–2014); FCA US LLC (2014–2020)
- Also called: Dodge Grand Caravan; Chrysler Town & Country; Ram C/V Tradesman; Chrysler Voyager; Lancia Voyager; Volkswagen Routan
- Production: 2007–2020
- Model years: 2008–2020 (Grand Caravan); 2009–2014 (Routan); 2008–2016 (Town & Country)
- Assembly: Windsor, Ontario, Canada (Chrysler Canada: 2007–2020); St. Louis, Missouri, United States (2007–2008)
- Designer: Ralph Gilles

Body and chassis
- Body style: 4-door minivan
- Layout: Front-engine, front-wheel drive
- Platform: Chrysler RT platform

Powertrain
- Engine: 2.8 L 176 hp (131 kW) CRD I4 diesel (export only); 3.3 L 175 hp (130 kW) V6; 3.8 L 197 hp (147 kW) V6; 4.0 L 251 hp (187 kW) V6; 3.6 L 283 hp (211 kW) V6
- Transmission: 4-speed automatic (3.3 engine); 62TE 6-speed automatic (3.6, 3.8, 4.0 engines)

Dimensions
- Wheelbase: 121.2 in (3,078 mm)
- Length: 202.5 in (5,144 mm); 202.8 in (5,151 mm) (Ram C/V)
- Width: 78.7 in (1,999 mm); 76.9 in (1,953 mm) (Routan)
- Height: 68.9 in (1,750 mm); 69.0 in (1,753 mm) (Ram C/V)
- Curb weight: 4,306 lb (1,953 kg)

Chronology
- Predecessor: Chrysler minivans (RS); Lancia Phedra/Lancia Zeta (For Lancia Voyager)
- Successor: Chrysler Pacifica; Chrysler Voyager (RU); Chrysler Grand Caravan (Canada); Ram ProMaster City (For Cargo Van)

The RT-platform Chrysler minivans are a series of passenger minivans marketed by Chrysler starting in model year 2008, the fifth in six generations of Chrysler minivans. Depending on the market, these vans were known as the Dodge Grand Caravan, Chrysler Town & Country, Chrysler Grand Voyager, Lancia Voyager, Ram Cargo Van, and the Volkswagen Routan, a modified version sold by Volkswagen in North America. Only long wheelbase models were offered with the Dodge Journey replacing the short wheelbase model. While most versions were discontinued in 2016 with the launch of the Chrysler Pacifica minivan, the Grand Caravan remained in production until 2020. It was replaced by the sixth generation Chrysler Voyager (continuing under the Grand Caravan nameplate in Canada), a new entry-level model based on the existing Chrysler Pacifica minivan.

== Overview ==
Chrysler debuted the 2008 model year minivans at the 2007 Detroit Auto Show — eliminating the short-wheelbase model. With discontinuation of the short-wheelbase minivans, Dodge offered the Journey on nearly an identical wheelbase and as a crossover rather than a minivan. Although the SWB model, which had accounted for half of all sales in Canada, cost approximately $2,000 less and offered a four-cylinder engine option with improved fuel economy, Chrysler executives stated the SWB Caravan was discontinued to accommodate new features offered in the Grand Caravan, consistent with the demands of the majority of the minivan market.

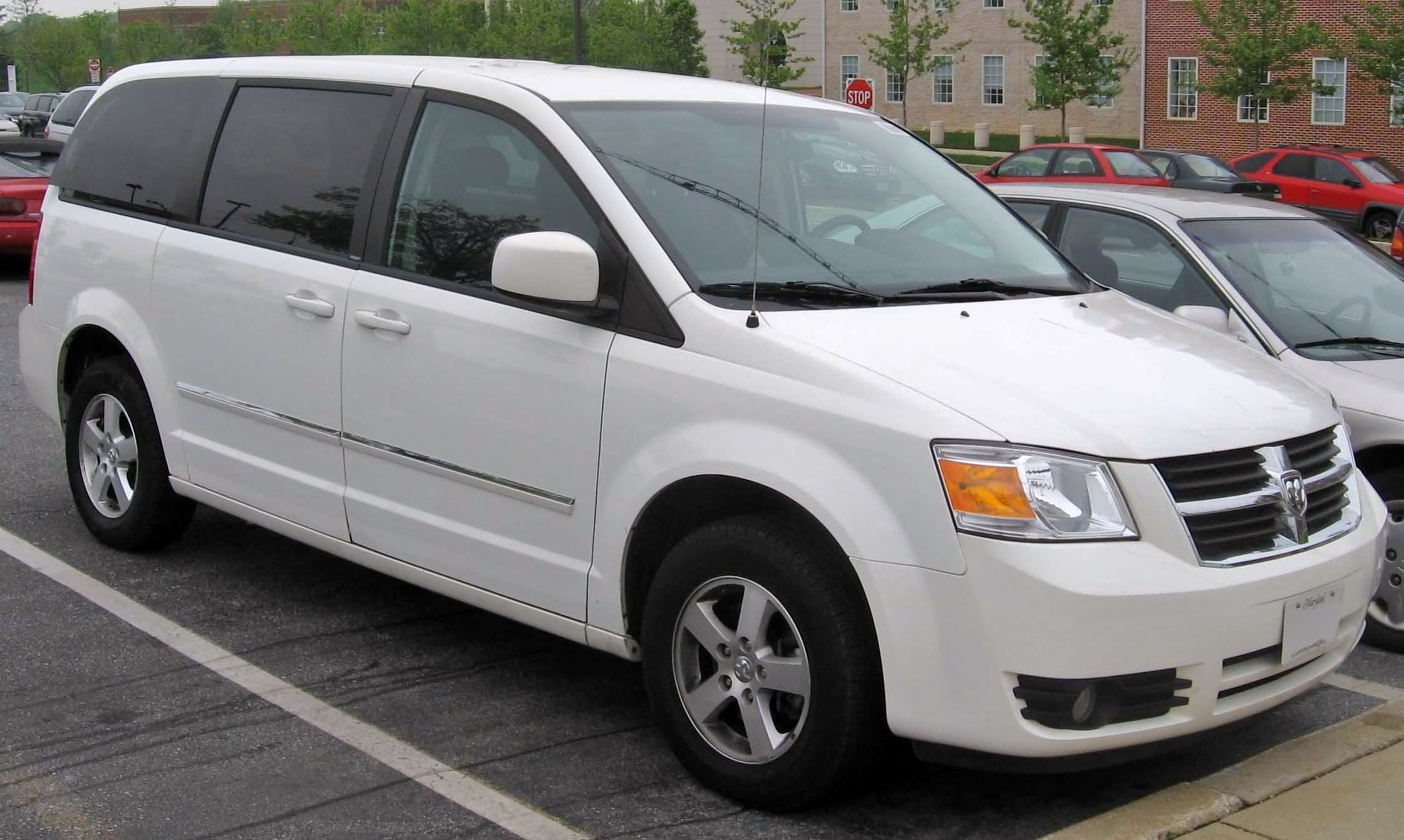
2008 Dodge Grand Caravan

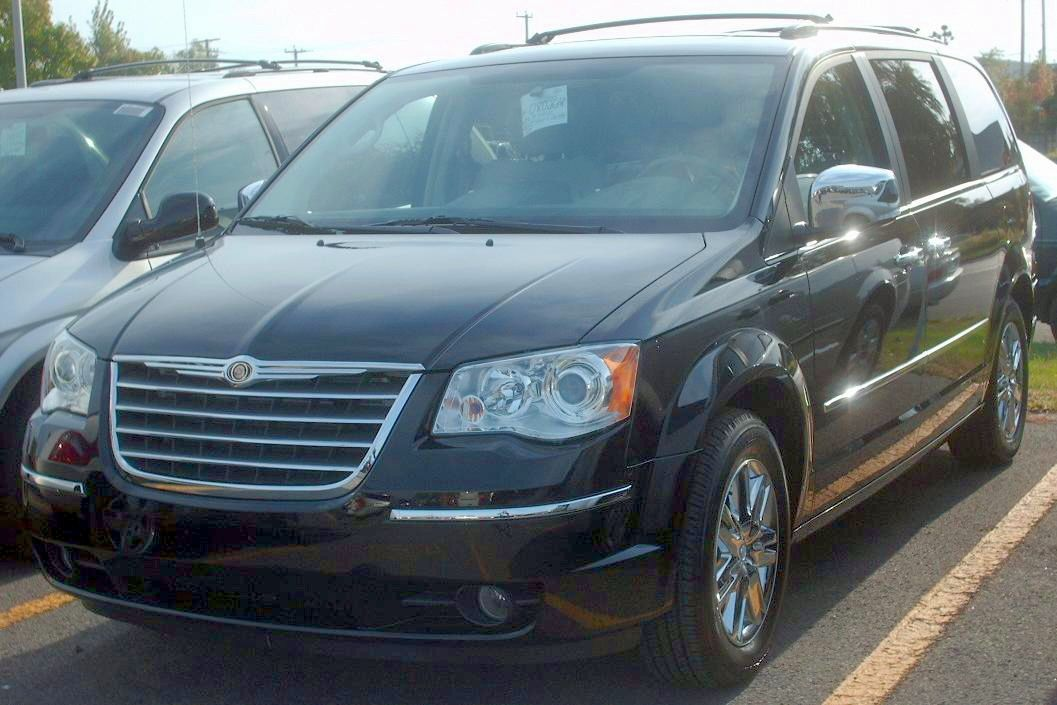
2008 Chrysler Town & Country

The RT minivans were a completely new design, sharing few components with the previous model. They abandoned the rounded styling introduced on the NS vans, instead using a more boxy look styled by Ralph Gilles. New features include standard electronic stability control, the MyGIG entertainment system (a stereo with built-in hard drive for recording, storing, and playing music), second and third row video screens, powered second row windows, standard side curtain airbags, and dashboard-mounted transmission controls. Much like its competitors, the Toyota Sienna and Honda Odyssey, the Town & Country now featured power windows on the sliding doors and moved the gear shift from the steering column to the center console, in a higher position. Another new feature of this generation was an available rear overhead console which featured LED map lights as well as halo ambient lighting. A new DVD system was also available, which featured dual screens for the rear passengers. SIRIUS Backseat TV was also offered, which featured three channels of children's programming. The Stow 'n Go seats, carried over from the previous generation, were standard, with a new seating system marketed as Swivel 'n Go optional on higher-end models. In this seating system, two full-size second row seats swivel to face the third row. A detachable table can be placed between the second and third-row seats. The Swivel 'n Go seating system includes the 3rd-row seating from the Stow 'n Go system, but not the second row, which must be manually removed from the vehicle. This model was exported as the Chrysler Town & Country to the Philippines, as well as to Central and South America, with the Chrysler Grand Voyager name being used to all other markets.

=== Volkswagen Routan ===
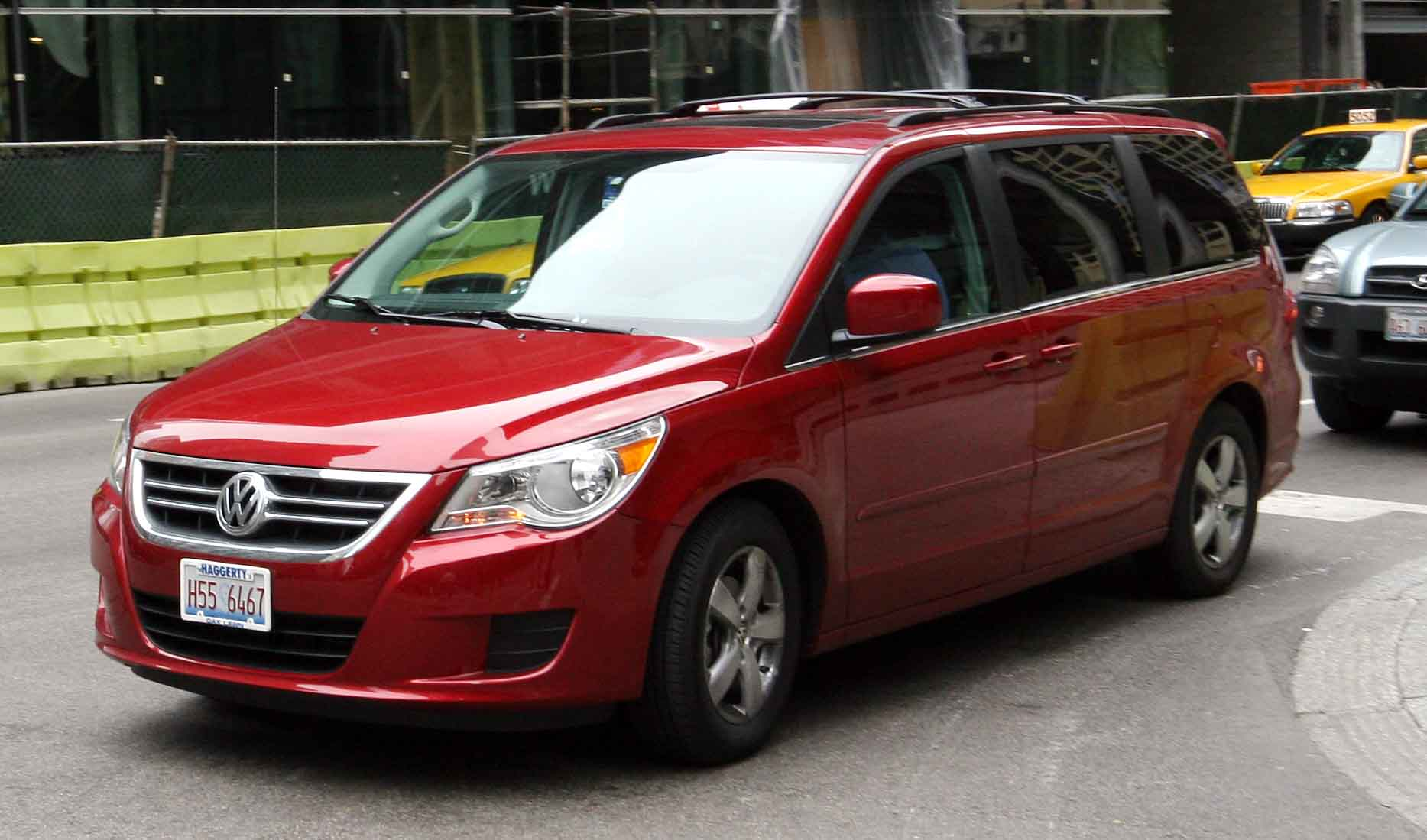
Volkswagen Routan SEL

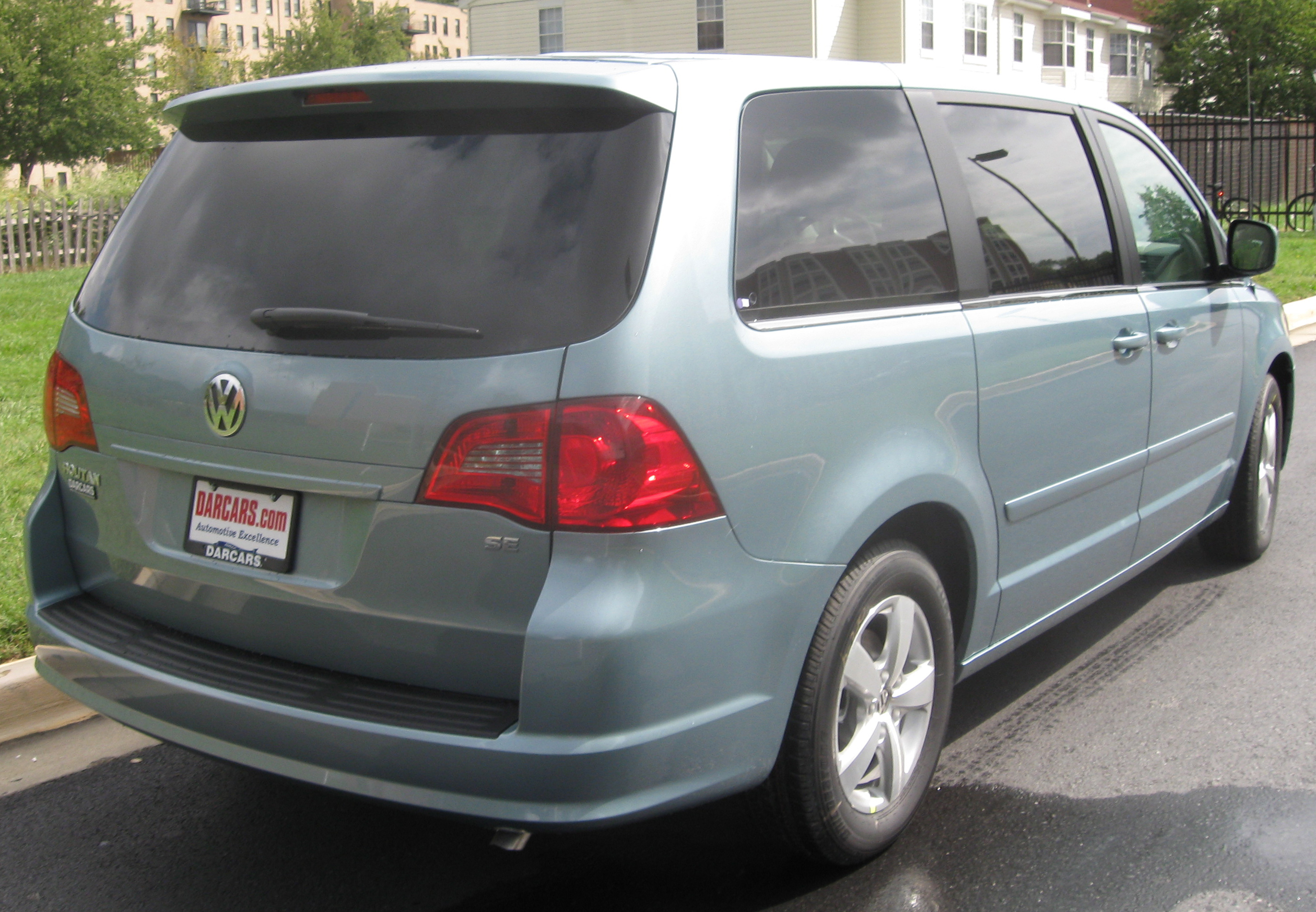
Volkswagen Routan SE

The Volkswagen Routan is a seven-seat rebadged variant of the RT minivans with revised styling, content features and suspension tuning. Manufactured alongside the Chrysler and Dodge minivans at Windsor Assembly and marketed in the United States, Canada, and Mexico, the Routan debuted at the 2008 Chicago Auto Show and went on sale in the United States in September 2008. The Routan's minivan variants include the Dodge Caravan, Ram C/V, Chrysler Town & Country, and Chrysler Grand Voyager (export)—that by 2009 have ranked as the 13th bestselling automotive nameplate worldwide, with over 12 million sold.

The Routan marked the start of Volkswagen's business strategy to offer additional vehicles specially developed for the U.S. market. The introduction of the 2008 model year minivan resulted from a partnership that began in 2005 between Volkswagen and DaimlerChrysler. Prior to the agreement, Volkswagen had no minivan model for the United States or Canadian markets. The Routan is sold only in North America (U.S., Canada, Mexico).

The automaker's intent with outsourcing production the Routan to Chrysler was to avoid the significant expense of developing its own family-sized minivan. VW announced in an early 2008 projection that the company intended for the Routan and other models to help achieve significant expansion of U.S. sales. The Routan was Volkswagen's first van offered in North America since discontinuation of the Volkswagen Eurovan in 2003, and is not related to the European-market Volkswagen Touran or Sharan.

The Routan features a rebranded version of Chrysler's hard drive-based audio and navigation system—marketed by Chrysler as the MyGig system and by Volkswagen as the Joybox, but has neither Chrysler's Stow'n Go nor Swivel'n Go seating systems. Instead, the second row seats in the Routan feature the Easy Out Roller Seat system, but can be modified using Chrysler or Dodge parts to have Stow'n Go or have Swivel'n Go seats installed. Routans as of 2010 offer optional Wi-Fi access, which was also offered in Dodge and Chrysler versions as UConnect Web.

VW of America had projected for the Routan to gain at least five percent of the U.S. minivan market, or 45,000 units of the 700,000 minivans sold currently. In January 2009, VW of America asked Chrysler Canada to stop production of the Routan for the month of February after 29,000 Routans had been shipped to US dealerships. By July 2009, 11,677 units had been sold. In 2012, Volkswagen halted production of the Routan at Chrysler's Windsor, Ontario, plant, despite having a production contract that ran through 2014. In January 2013, Volkswagen announced there would be no 2013 retail model, but held open the possibility that development may resume with a potential 2014 model. The 2013 Routan was reserved for fleet purchasers, and 2,500 were produced by Chrysler during the calendar year.

Automotive industry analysts were not surprised by VW's decision to drop the Routan because buyers had no reason for selecting the Routan over the similar Dodge Grand Caravan or the Chrysler Town & Country, and the Routan's base price of nearly $28,000 was far more than the basic $21,000 Grand Caravan, while the Routan's list of equipment was less than included on the upscale Town & Country.

| Jan 2008 | Feb 2008 | Mar 2008 | Apr 2008 | May 2008 | Jun 2008 | Jul 2008 | Aug 2008 | Sep 2008 | Oct 2008 | Nov 2008 | Dec 2008 | Total 2008 |
|---|---|---|---|---|---|---|---|---|---|---|---|---|
| — | — | — | — | — | — | — | — | 375 | 789 | 1,324 | 899 | 3,387 |
| Jan 2009 | Feb 2009 | Mar 2009 | Apr 2009 | May 2009 | Jun 2009 | Jul 2009 | Aug 2009 | Sep 2009 | Oct 2009 | Nov 2009 | Dec 2009 | Total 2009 |
| 663 | 503 | 1,029 | 2,606 | 1,390 | 2,099 | 1,350 | 2,098 | 901 | 669 | 540 | 833 | 14,681 |

=== 2011 revision ===
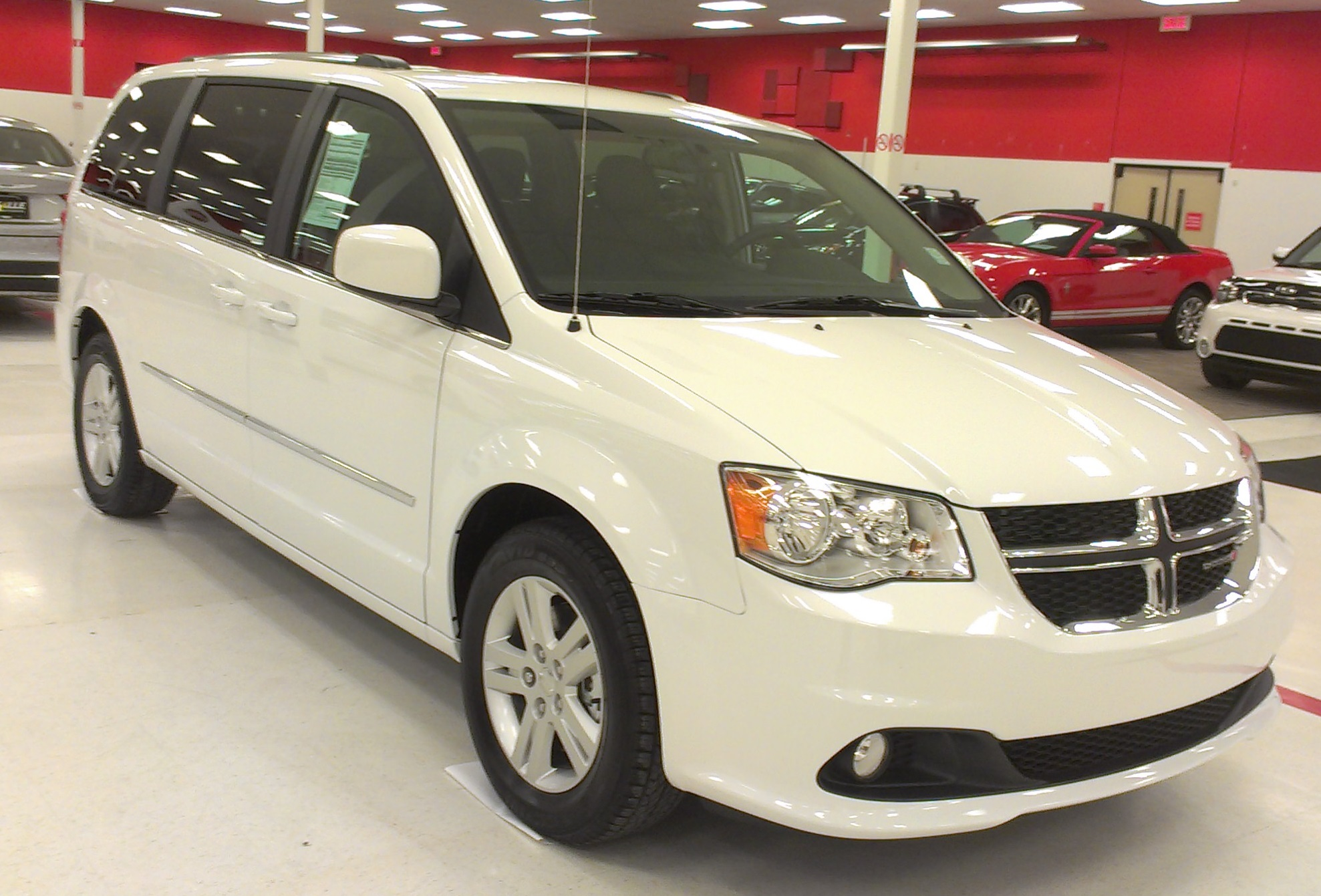
2016 Dodge Grand Caravan

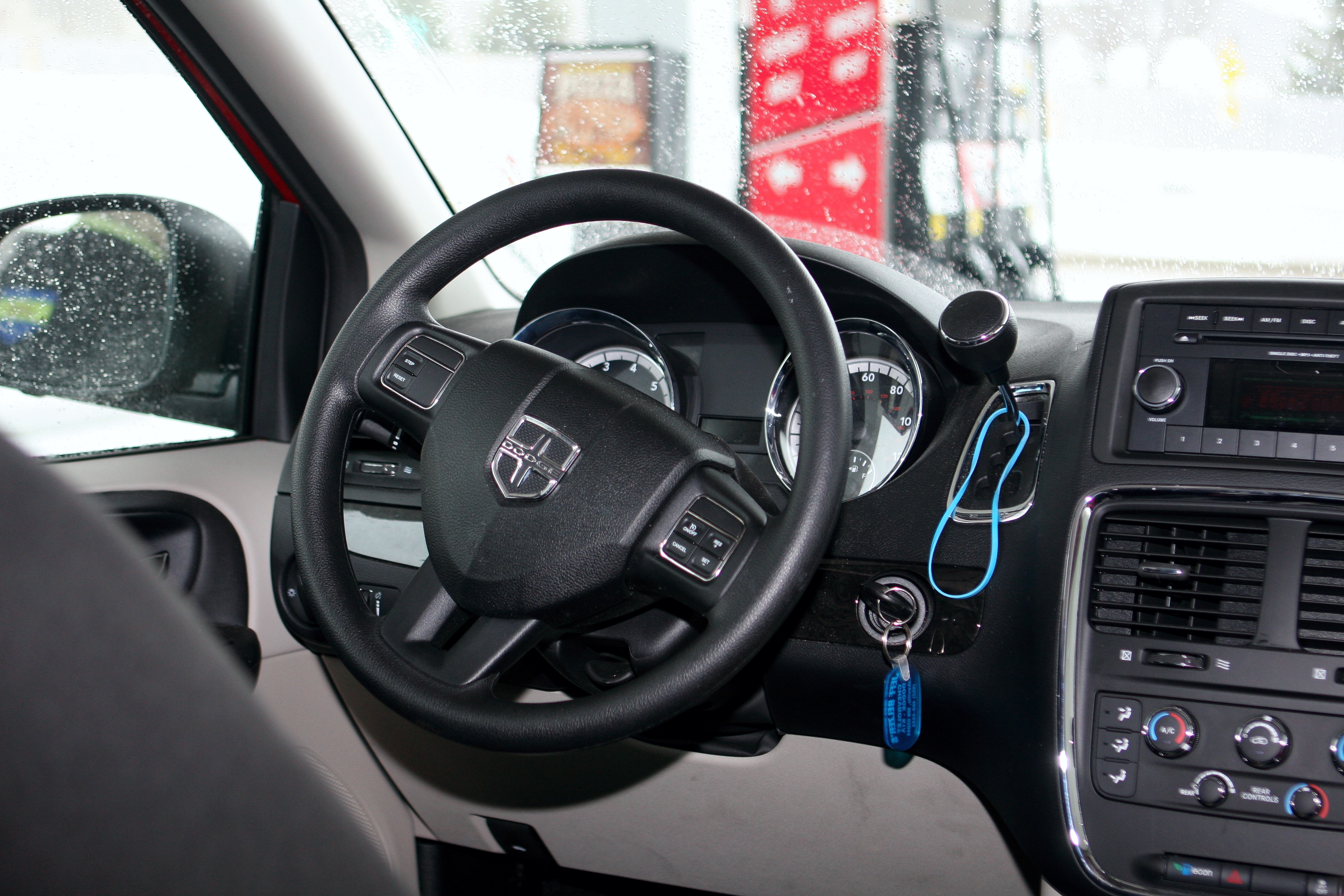
Revised interior in a Dodge Grand Caravan

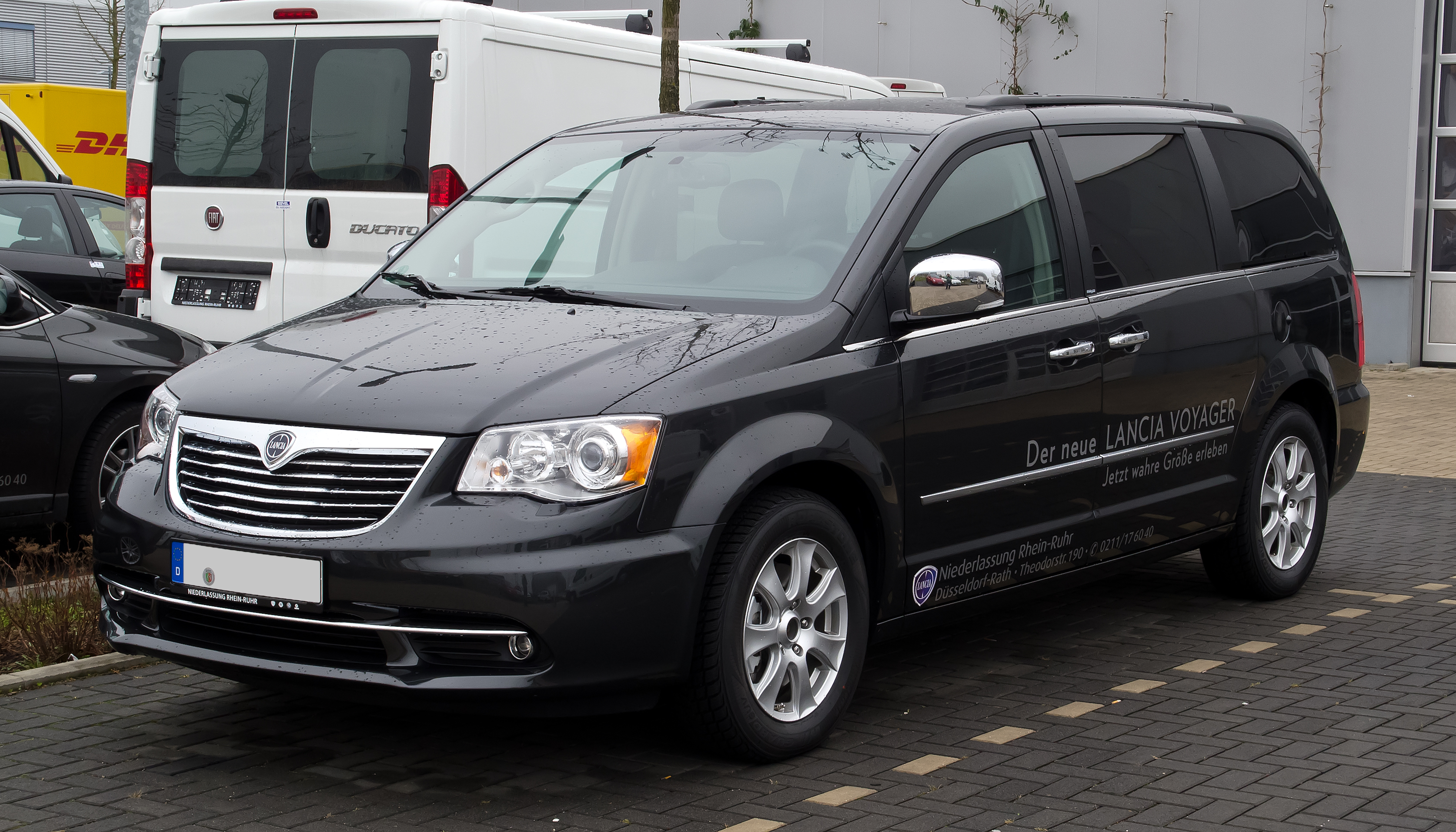
Lancia Voyager

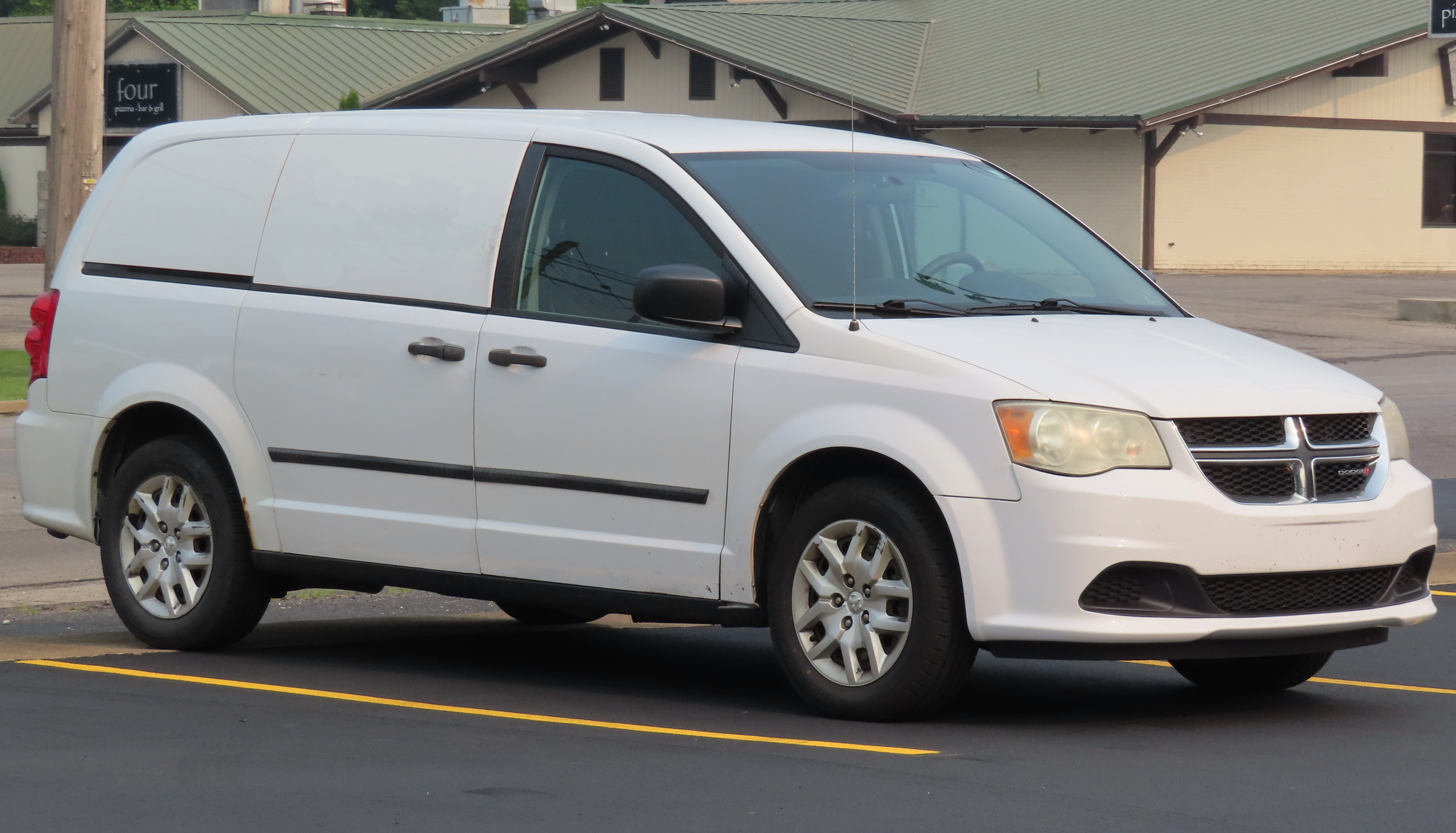
2014 Ram Cargo Tradesman

The Chrysler minivans underwent a mid-cycle refresh for the 2011 model year, which included major changes in both styling and functionality. Changes included restyled exterior and interior with all-new wing logo, standard SafetyTech (including Blind Spot Monitoring and Rear Cross Path Detection), improvement to the Stow 'n Go seating and storage system, a one-touch fold down feature for easier access to the third row, (The Swivel n' Go seats were dropped) a new center console and technology, a dual DVD system that can play different media at the same time, SIRIUS Backseat TV which offers three channels of children's programming, FLO TV featuring 20 channels of live programming, Pentastar V6 (283 hp) engine replacing previous 3.8-liter and 3.3-liter V-6 engines, six-speed automatic transmission, a new fuel economizer mode, a new instrument panel and instrument cluster, new Chrysler Brand steering wheel with integrated controls that allow the driver to operate the radio, cruise control, hands-free phone and other vehicle functions while keeping their hands on the wheel; upgraded cloth and leather seating materials; new soft touch door trim, new heating and cooling control system. The suspension was heavily re-tuned, with both Dodge and Chrysler minivans gaining a larger front sway bar and new rear sway bar, increased rear roll center height, adjusted spring rates, a new steering gear, a revised front static camber setting, and lowered ride height. This dramatically improved handling in both the Chrysler and Dodge. Other changes included extra sound insulation, acoustic glass, new seats, softer-touch surfaces, new LED ambient lighting and center console, and halogen projector headlamps with LED accents. The Chrysler models were adjusted so that instead of competing against equivalent Dodge trim levels, they were above Dodge in trim and features.

All three of the former engine choices were replaced by the new Pentastar 3.6-liter V6 with six-speed automatic transmission, now the sole powertrain choice for all models. Interior trim was restyled on both vans, in addition to major exterior revisions highlighted by the new "double-crosshair" grille on the Grand Caravan and a new chrome grille for the Town & Country.

Chrysler Voyagers sold in continental Europe was rebranded as the Lancia Voyager. The Chrysler-branded Grand Voyager continued to be sold in the United Kingdom, Ireland, Russia, Australia, New Zealand, the Middle East, South Africa, South Korea, Singapore, and China, as Lancia does not have sales operations in those markets.

The Ram Cargo Tradesman, or Ram C/V Tradesman, debuted for the 2012 model year, replacing the Dodge Grand Caravan C/V. It is based on the Dodge Grand Caravan, but with solid metal instead of rear windows and a flat load space with 144.4 cubic feet (4,090 L) of interior storage, and a 1,800 lb (820 kg). cargo payload plus a towing capability of up to 3,600 lb (1,600 kg). The Ram C/V is offered with a 3.6-liter Pentastar V-6 engine and 6-speed automatic transmission. The C/V Tradesman was discontinued after the 2015 model year in favor of the ProMaster City.

=== Safety ===
In the U.S. the National Highway Traffic Safety Administration's (NHTSA) New Car Assessment Program crash testing, the 2010 Dodge Grand Caravan achieved a five star (top safety) rating in several categories.

| Frontal Impact – Driver and Passenger: | 5/5 stars |
| Side Impact Driver: | 5/5 stars |
| Side Impact Rear Passenger: | 5/5 stars |
| Rollover: | 4/5 stars |

IIHS:
| Moderate overlap frontal offset | Good |
| Small overlap frontal offset | Poor |
| Side impact | Good |
| Roof strength (2012–present models) | Good |

Euro NCAP test results Lancia Voyager (2011)
| Test | Points | % |
|---|---|---|
| Overall: | 4 /5 stars | |
| Adult occupant: | 29 | 79% |
| Child occupant: | 33 | 67% |
| Pedestrian: | 17 | 47% |
| Safety assist: | 5 | 71% |

=== Powertrains ===
The 2.4 L EDZ I4 was dropped, with the 3.3 L EGA V6 standard. The 3.8 L EGH V6 engine was optional on mid level models, with a 4.0L SOHC V6 engine optional as the top level engine. A 2.8 L RA428 I4 diesel was available on export models, while the 3.3L wasn't offered in Europe. The 3.3L got a 4 speed Ultradrive automatic transmission, while all the other engines came with a new 6 speed 62TE automatic transmission. In 2011, the 3.3L, 3.8L and 4.0L engines were all dropped, replaced with the Pentastar 3.6 L V6, which came with the 62TE transmission.

| Model | Displacement | Type | Valves | Power (HP) | hp @ rpm | Torque (lb-ft) | Torque @ rpm | Compression Ratio | Transmission | Fuel economy (MPG) | Years |
|---|---|---|---|---|---|---|---|---|---|---|---|
| 2.8L VM Motori A 428 DOHC diesel I4 | 2,766 cc (168.8 cu in) | DOHC | 16 | 161 | 3600 | 266 | 2000 | | 6-speed 62TE automatic | | 2011– |
| 2.8L VM Motori RA 428 DOHC diesel I4 | 2,766 cc (168.8 cu in) | DOHC | 16 | 161 | 3600 | 310 | 2000 | | 6-speed 62TE automatic | | 2008–2010 |
| 3.3 L V6 | 3,301 cc (201.4 cu in) | OHV | 12 | 175 | 5,000 | 205 | 4,000 | 9.3:1 | 4-speed 41TE automatic | 17/24 | 2008–2010 |
| Pentastar 3.6 L V6 | 3,600 cc (220 cu in) | DOHC | 24 | 283 | 6,400 | 260 | 4,400 | 10.0:1 | 6-speed 62TE automatic | 17/25 | 2011–2020 |
| 3.8 L V6 | 3,778 cc (230.5 cu in) | OHV | 12 | 197 | 5,200 | 230 | 4,000 | 9.6:1 | 6-speed 62TE automatic | 16/23 | 2008–2010 |
| 4.0 L V6 | 3,952 cc (241.2 cu in) | SOHC | 24 | 251 | 6,000 | 259 | 4,100 | 10.2:1 | 6-speed 62TE automatic | 16/23 (2008), 17/25 (2009–2010) | 2008–2010 |

=== Sales ===
Grand Caravan:

| Calendar Year | United States | Canada | Total |
|---|---|---|---|
| 2008 | 123,749 | 39,396 | 163,145 |
| 2009 | 90,666 | 40,283 | 130,949 |
| 2010 | 103,323 | 55,306 | 158,629 |
| 2011 | 110,862 | 53,406 | 164,268 |
| 2012 | 141,468 | 51,552 | 193,020 |
| 2013 | 124,019 | 46,732 | 170,751 |
| 2014 | 134,152 | 51,759 | 185,911 |
| 2015 | 97,141 | 46,927 | 144,068 |
| 2016 | 125,275 | 51,349 | 176,624 |
| 2017 | 125,196 | 46,933 | 172,129 |
| 2018 | 151,927 | 32,253 | 184,180 |
| 2019 | 122,648 | 27,982 | 150,630 |

Automotive news reported that, from January to October in 2010, Dodge sold about a third of its 2010 Grand Caravans to rental fleets. The number of returned ex-rental 2010 Grand Caravan to the market jumped fourfold between July and October, depressing prices of used 2009 and 2010 Dodge minivans by as much as 20%.

Town & Country:

| Calendar Year | United States | Canada | Total |
|---|---|---|---|
| 2007 | 138,151 | 1,531 | 139,682 |
| 2008 | 118,563 | 4,865 | 123,428 |
| 2009 | 84,558 | 3,165 | 87,723 |
| 2010 | 112,275 | 4,175 | 116,450 |
| 2011 | 94,320 | 4,536 | 98,856 |
| 2012 | 111,744 | 3,991 | 115,735 |
| 2013 | 122,288 | 8,425 | 130,713 |
| 2014 | 138,040 | 8,944 | 146,984 |
| 2015 | 93,848 | 9,001 | 102,849 |
| 2016 | 59,071 | 2,910 | 61,981 |

== Discontinuation ==
With the all-new 2017 Chrysler Pacifica introduced to replace the Chrysler Town & Country, the Dodge Grand Caravan was due to be discontinued after the 2016 model year. However, it was later announced that the Grand Caravan would be sold alongside the Chrysler Pacifica unchanged from the 2016 model, with a simplified model lineup.

At the 2018 North American International Auto Show in Detroit, Michigan, Fiat CEO Sergio Marchionne said there may be a successor to the current Dodge Grand Caravan, which would be based on the Chrysler Pacifica, saying that the Grand Caravan successor would be "a Caravan-like vehicle".

Marchionne is quoted as saying, "The replacement of the Caravan will be a Caravan-like vehicle. I need another minivan. It's going to be in line with the Pacifica architecture".

Dodge originally announced that the Grand Caravan will be discontinued in May 2020 but has since pushed it back by three months, with the current end date being August 22. Its replacement will be the Chrysler Voyager, which is an entry-level version of the Chrysler Pacifica minivan, and will offer similar pricing and features to its Grand Caravan predecessor. In Canada, a version similar to the Pacifica will be sold as the Chrysler Grand Caravan. For its final model year, the Grand Caravan will be offered in three trim levels: base SE, midlevel SE Plus, and range-topping SXT. The previous GT trim, a fleet-exclusive model, has been dropped for the 2020 model year. For 2020, the midlevel SE Plus receives standard "Super Stow-'n'-Go" second-row bucket seats and in-floor storage bin, a standard eight-way power front driver's seat, a black interior with "Cranberry Wine" stitching, and an available Blacktop Package. The base SE trim no longer offers aluminum-alloy wheels as an option. A compact spare tire and wheel is now optional equipment on all trim levels.
