= Chrysler Pacifica (1999 concept vehicle) =

Overview
- Manufacturer: DaimlerChrysler
- Production: 1999
- Model years: 1999

Body and chassis
- Body style: 5-door minivan
- Layout: Transverse FF layout Transverse F4 layout
- Platform: Chrysler NS
- Related: Chrysler Town & Country; Chrysler Voyager; Dodge Caravan; Plymouth Voyager

Powertrain
- Engine: Chrysler 60° pushrod V6
- Transmission: 4-speed Ultradrive

Dimensions
- Wheelbase: 119.3 in (3,030 mm)
- Length: 199.7 in (5,072 mm)
- Width: 76.8 in (1,951 mm)

The Chrysler Pacifica was a concept luxury minivan created by DaimlerChrysler under the Chrysler marque in 1999. The Pacifica was built in commemoration of the Chrysler minivan's 15th anniversary and was intended to be a more upscale variant of the Town & Country with an LHS inspired front fascia and a raised roof, which included a skylight and overhead storage bins. It could seat up to six, with four front and rear captain's chairs and fold-out jump seats on each of the rear seats. The 2nd row seats featured power footrests. The concept also had a golf bag rack in the trunk space that could hold up to four golf bags.

The name was eventually applied to a crossover, itself inspired by the Chrysler Citadel concept, which was produced from 2003 to 2008 and is currently being used on the replacement for the Town & Country minivan.

== See also ==
- Chrysler Citadel
- Chrysler Pacifica crossover
- Chrysler Pacifica minivan
- Chrysler Town & Country
