= Chrysler Pacifica =

Chrysler Pacifica is a nameplate used by Chrysler for a variety of vehicles.

The name was first used on a luxury minivan concept vehicle in 1999, and later a crossover concept in 2002.

From 2004 to 2008, it was used on a mid-size crossover, and since the 2017 model year, it has been used as the Town & Country minivan's replacement.

Vehicles using the nameplate are:

- Chrysler Pacifica concept (1999), concept minivan
- Chrysler Pacifica concept (2002), concept crossover
- Chrysler Pacifica (crossover) (2004–2008), production version of the 2002 concept
- Chrysler Pacifica (minivan) (2017–present), Chrysler Town & Country replacement
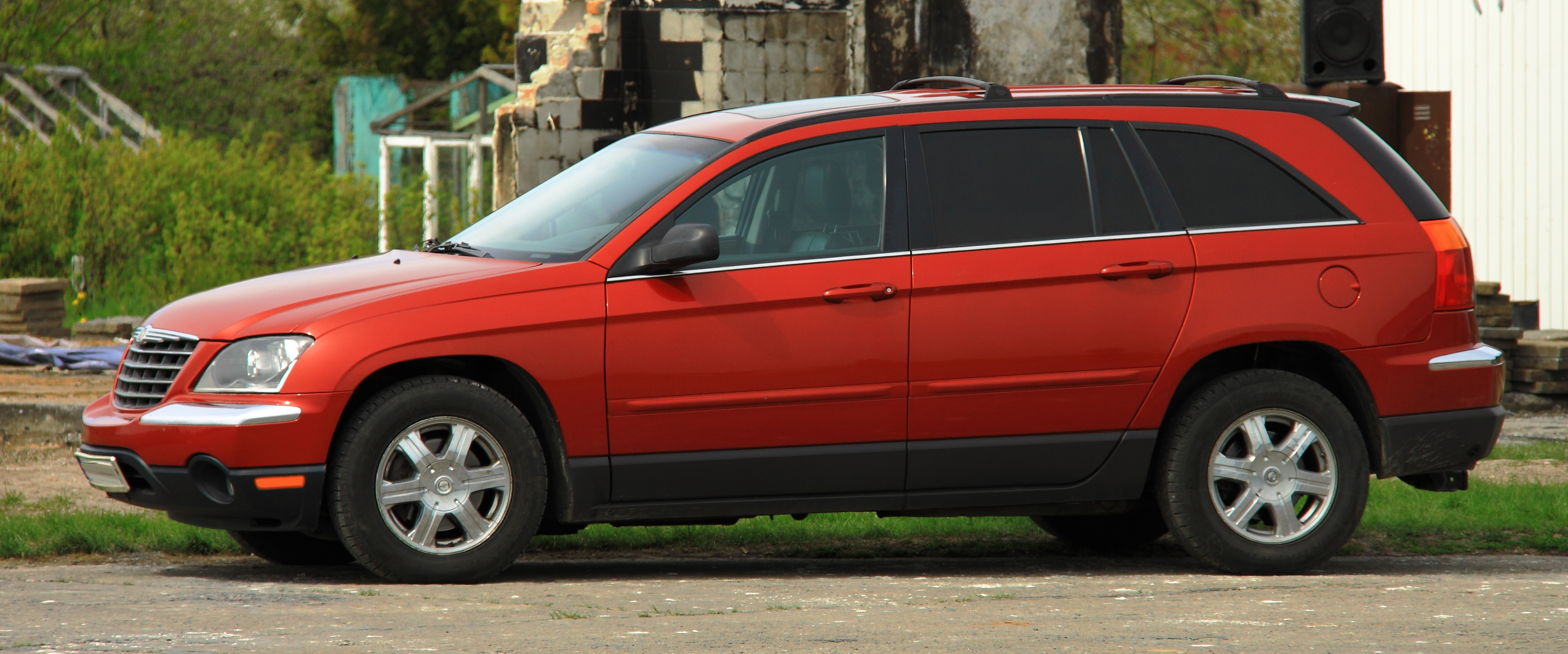
2004–2008 Chrysler Pacifica (crossover)

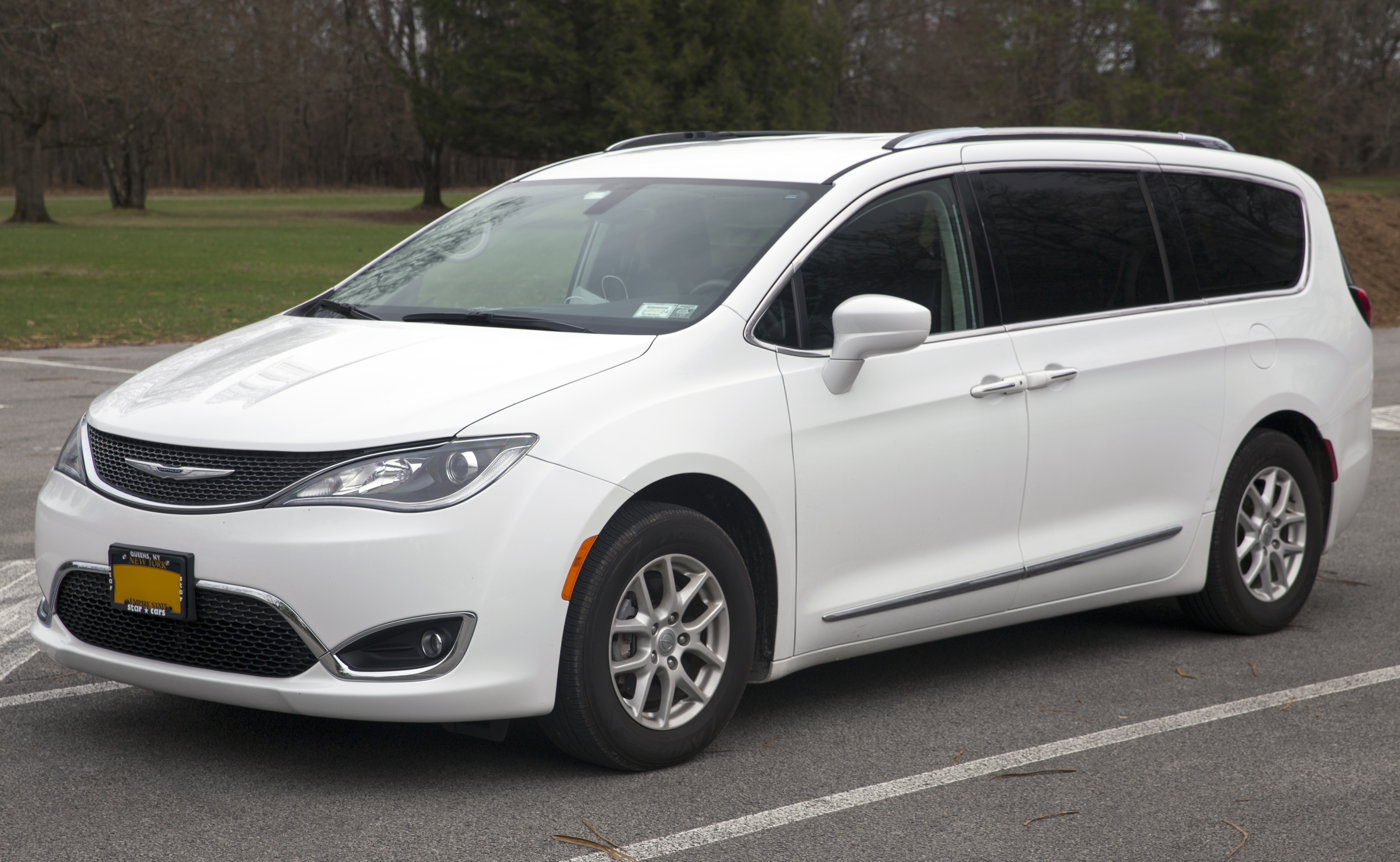
2017–present Chrysler Pacifica (minivan)
