= Chrysler Pacifica (crossover) =

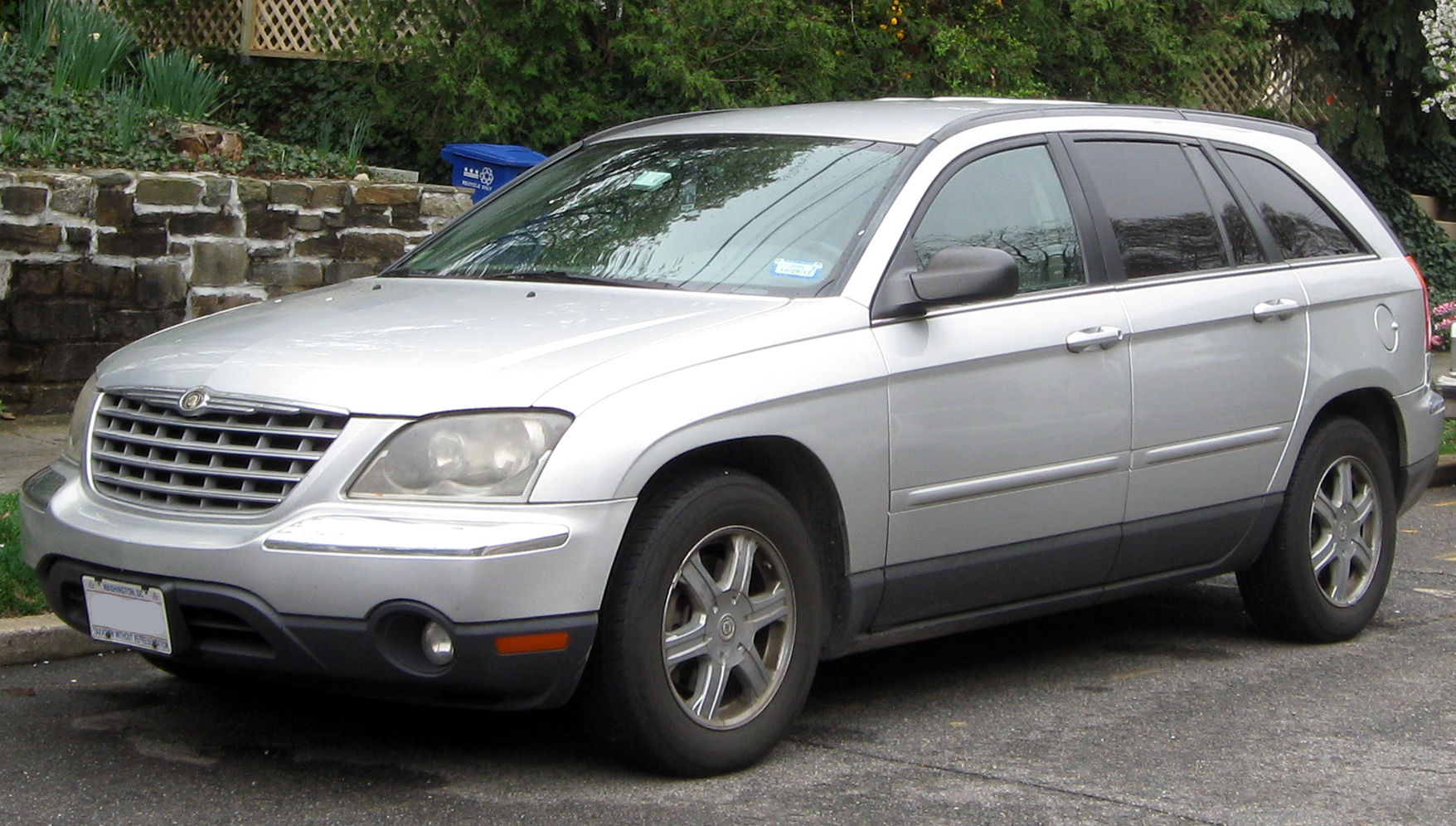
- Chrysler Pacifica (pre-facelift)

Overview
- Manufacturer: Chrysler (Note: DaimlerChrysler (2004–2007) Chrysler LLC (2007–2008))
- Production: January 2003 – November 2007
- Model years: 2004–2008
- Assembly: Canada: Windsor, Ontario (Windsor Assembly)
- Designer: Freeman Thomas (1999)

Body and chassis
- Class: Mid-size crossover SUV
- Body style: 5-door SUV
- Layout: Front-engine, front-wheel-drive Front-engine, four-wheel-drive
- Platform: Chrysler CS platform
- Related: Chrysler Town & Country; Dodge Caravan; Dodge Grand Caravan; Chrysler Voyager

Powertrain
- Engine: Gasoline: 3.5 L EGJ V6; 3.8 L EGH V6; 4.0 L EGQ V6
- Transmission: 4-speed Ultradrive 41TE automatic 4-speed Ultradrive 41AE automatic 6-speed Ultradrive 62TE automatic

Dimensions
- Wheelbase: 116.3 in (2,954 mm)
- Length: 198.5 in (5,042 mm) (2004–06); 198.9 in (5,052 mm) (2007–08)
- Width: 79.3 in (2,014 mm)
- Height: 66.5 in (1,689 mm) (2004–06); 68.3 in (1,735 mm) (2007–08)

Chronology
- Successor: Chrysler Pacifica (RU) (Pacifica nameplate); Dodge Journey (as a crossover)

The Chrysler Pacifica is a mid-size crossover produced by Chrysler from 2003 to 2007, for the model years 2004 to 2008.

The Pacifica was the first jointly engineered product of the 1998 DaimlerChrysler "merger of equals." Chrysler developed the vehicle in 30 months at a cost below $1 billion. The CUV was inspired by the 1999 Chrysler Pacifica and 2000 Chrysler Citadel concept cars. The production model was first introduced at the 2002 New York International Auto Show. Chrysler marketed the Pacifica as a "sports-tourer," building the vehicle at the Windsor Assembly Plant, alongside the long-wheelbase minivans from January 2003 through November 2007. The "Pacifica" name was briefly used as a trim package on the Dodge Daytona for 1987–1988 after the Chrysler Laser was discontinued.

In January 2016, the Pacifica name was revived for a 2017 model year minivan, which debuted at the North American International Auto Show as a replacement for the Chrysler Town & Country.

== Model year changes ==
=== 2004 ===
Initially, the Pacifica came in just one trim level.

=== 2005 and 2006 ===
Starting in 2005, the Pacifica was expanded into four trim levels: Base, Touring, Limited, and a special-edition Signature Series. The interior was also slightly restyled. Faux wood trim came standard in Pacifica Touring and Limited models, while the base-model "Pacifica" (later Pacifica LX), offered interior colored plastic trim. Signature Series models had metal clad interior trim and two-tone leather seats.

=== 2007 ===
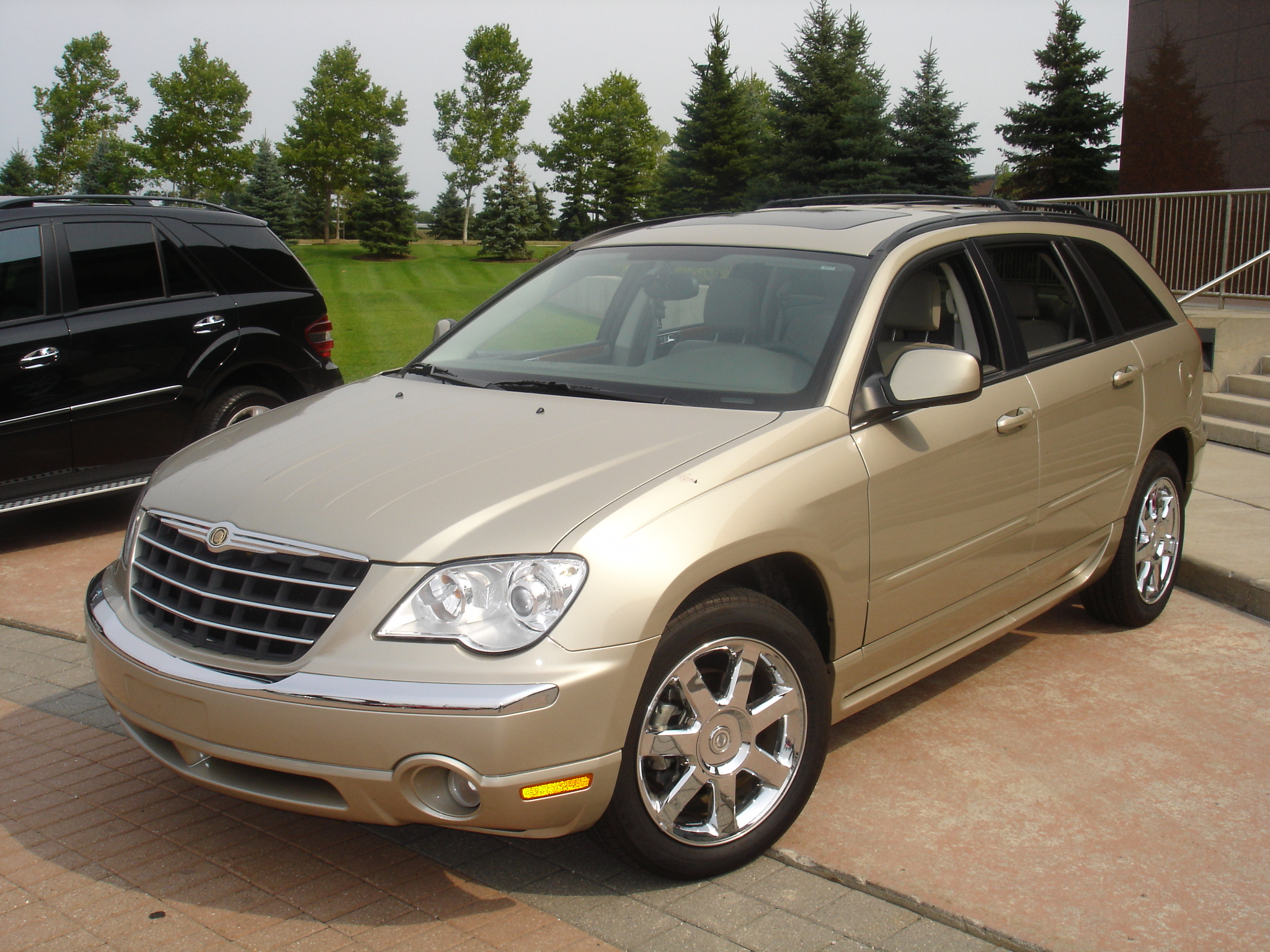
2008 Pacifica Limited (US; facelift)

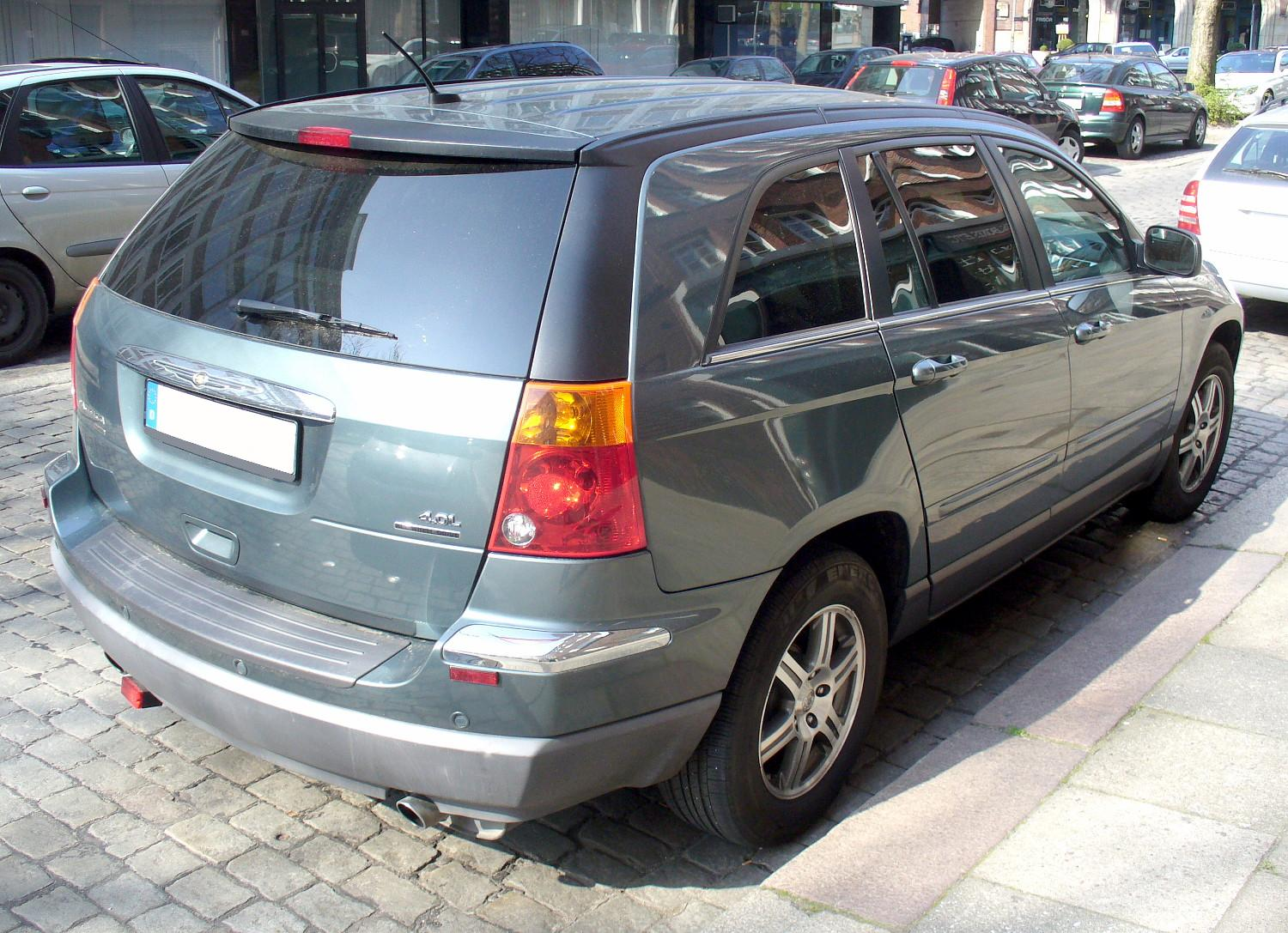
Chrysler Pacifica 4.0L AWD (Europe; facelift)

The Pacifica's exterior was slightly restyled for 2007, including its headlights, hood, fenders, grille, front fascia and wheels. The brand new 4.0 L SOHC V6 engine was added, to complement the standard 3.8 L EGH V6. With the addition of the new engine and transmission, Dual Exhaust was added. New options included a rearview camera incorporated into the navigation system, stain, odor, and static-resistant seat fabric and new wheel options.

=== 2008 (discontinuation) ===
Chrysler announced on November 1, 2007 discontinuation of the Pacifica, producing the last Pacifica that same month. The final Pacifica rolled off the assembly line on November 23, 2007.

== Description ==
=== Powertrain ===
The Pacifica crossovers were equipped with "Autostick" transaxles, Chrysler's version of a manually controlled automatic transmission. Other features include five-link rear suspension, self-leveling rear shock absorbers, and variable assist rack-and-pinion steering. The Pacifica offered a towing capacity of 3,500 pounds (1,600 kg).

At first, Pacifica was powered by a 3.5-liter V6 with 250 hp (186 kW) and 250 lb⋅ft (340 N⋅m) of torque. Reviewers faulted the gruff engine, which was barely up to the task of battling the Pacifica's formidable mass, especially on fully loaded all-wheel-drive models. The 3.5-liter V6 with 250 hp (186 kW) and 250 lb⋅ft (340 N⋅m) was standard on all but the base front-wheel-drive model in 2005 using the 3.8-liter V6. The 3.8-liter V6 with 210 horsepower and 240 pound-feet (330 N⋅m) was eliminated for 2006, leaving the 3.5-liter unit as the sole available engine. For 2007, the 3.8-liter engine returned in the base front-wheel-drive model, this time rated at 200 hp (149 kW), and a new 4.0-liter V6 replaced the 3.5-liter V6 in all other models. The 4.0-liter engine produced 255 hp (190 kW) and 265 lb⋅ft (359 N⋅m) and was mated with a new six-speed automatic transmission (the base engine continued with the four-speed unit) which allowed a respectable 0-60 mph time of 7.4 seconds.

=== Safety ===
In 2006 the Chrysler Pacifica won an award from the Insurance Institute for Highway Safety as the "best pick frontal". In 2007, the Pacifica won a five star front and side crash test rating. The Pacifica received this award for being equipped with traction control, four wheel disc brakes with anti-lock braking system, all-row side curtain air bags, Electronic Stability Program, and tire pressure monitoring system.

=== Features ===
During the first model year, Pacificas were equipped lavishly and were expensive as a result, as they included costly luxury features such as a navigation system, DVD entertainment system, and a load-leveling suspension. In later model years, additional trim and equipment levels were added.

Third row seating was standard on all but the entry-level Pacificas released after 2004. Front row seats featured an eight-way power driver seat and four-way power passenger seat on all standard Pacificas. The Limited and Touring included a ten-way power seat for the driver. The Pacifica could be optioned with a seating preference memory system that also controlled mirrors and pedals. Seats were available with stain and odor resistant fabric or leather on all seats and six different fabric designs. Cargo space was 79.5 cubic feet (2,250 L) with the second and third rows folded.

All Pacifica models came with AM/FM radio along with CD player and a seven speaker, 200-watt Infinity audio system. Limited models came with a year subscription of Sirius satellite radio, 6-disc DVD player capable of playing MP3, DVD audio, DVD video, DVD-R and DVD-RW discs, and an available eight-speaker 385-watt Infinity "Intermezzo" audio system with subwoofer. Standard models included dual-zone manual temperature control while the Limited and Touring offered automatic temperature control system. Limited and Touring models offered an available navigation system, along with an optional rear-view camera. A hands-free communication system was also available. All trims featured power windows and door locks, remote keyless entry, and a full array of safety equipment.

=== Trim levels ===
All editions were available in front-wheel drive or all-wheel drive.

- Base • 2004–2007 - Included: cloth upholstery, power locks and mirrors, power windows with automatic driver's side window, four 12V power outlets, keyless entry, power front seats, and an AM/FM stereo with single-CD player, steering wheel controls, and 200 watt 7 speaker infinity system.
- LX • 2008 - Included: 3.8L V6 on FWD models, 4.0L V6 on AWD, cloth upholstery, power seats with heated front row seats, an AM/FM stereo with single-CD player and 6 speakers, keyless entry, security alarm, and power locks, windows with automatic driver's side window.
- Touring • 2005–2008 - Added: 4.0L V6 on FWD models, premium cloth or leather-trimmed upholstery, electronic vehicle information control, universal garage door opener, leather wrapped shift knob, storage bin, and an AM/FM radio with single-disc CD/DVD video/audio with MP3 capability, and 200-watt Infinity system with 7 speakers.
- Limited • 2005–2008 - Added: leather upholstery, floor mats, power mirrors with auto-dimming driver's mirror, a sunroof, cargo net, memory drivers seat, pedals and radio presets, leather-wrapped steering wheel, and an AM/FM stereo with in dash 6-disc CD/DVD changer with MP3 capability, SIRIUS Satellite Radio, and 200 watt Infinity sound system with 7 speakers.
- Signature Series • 2005–2008

== Reception ==
The Pacifica was the first jointly engineered product of the 1998 Chrysler-DaimlerBenz "merger of equals." Chrysler developed the vehicle in 30 months at a cost below $1 billion. Parent DaimlerChrysler's other entry in the luxury SUV market, the M-Class (badged as the ML) appeared to be a rushed engineering job from the Mercedes-Benz truck division yet it was a great success, leading to the second-generation M-Class that used a crossover instead of a light truck platform.

DaimlerChrysler heavily touted the Pacifica as the next "big thing" in the fledgling crossover market, forecasting sales of 100,000 per year. These estimations proved to be wildly optimistic, as sales never came close to expectations. There was stiff competition from other luxury crossovers like the Lexus RX and BMW X5; the RX was the volume leader and widely considered the benchmark for the class. Despite the Mercedes-like interior and other Mercedes-derived technologies, however, the Pacifica may have been overpriced for its marque, as general public perception did not consider Chrysler a luxury brand like BMW, Lexus, and Mercedes-Benz. Indeed, DaimlerChrysler was reluctant to heavily promote the fact that the Pacifica (as well as several other jointly engineered vehicles such as the Crossfire and 300) featured technologies from its Mercedes division due to fear of cannibalization, as Benz vehicles had much higher prices and profits than their Chrysler equivalents. A three-year, multimillion-dollar contract was signed with singer Celine Dion in 2003, with advertisements designed to reposition Chrysler as a premium marque. However, the promotional campaign was widely considered a flop and so DaimlerChrysler ended it just one year later. Ending up, however, DaimlerChrysler lost money on every Pacifica sold, as it used a modified minivan platform, but it didn’t have any interior commonality with other Chrysler, Dodge or Jeep vehicles.

Positioned as a large crossover, the Pacifica was designed to combine the convenience of a minivan, the elevated position of an SUV, and the handling of a sedan, as the minivan's popularity was being eclipsed by the SUV which in turn lost favor due to high gas prices. Compared to traditional (light truck-based) luxury sport utility vehicles such as the Lincoln Navigator, the Pacifica had less heavy cargo-hauling and towing capacity but otherwise it was superior in handling, comfort, interior, and amenities. Crossovers with three-row seating tend to be inferior to minivans in passenger room; the Pacifica was no exception as its third-row seats were considered too small compared to that of the Chrysler Town & Country which was less expensive and more fuel-efficient. However other luxury automakers have no minivans in most of their lineups which avoids cannibalization of the sales of their large crossovers, so it didn't help that the Pacifica inevitably drew comparisons to the Town & Country. Furthermore, DaimlerChrysler was unable to convince the public that the Pacifica was a pioneer of new category of vehicle, as consumers preferred more traditional SUV-style crossovers, and they faced the same problem with the release of the 2006 Mercedes-Benz R-Class in 2005. Like the Pacifica the R-Class is supposed to share the attributes of the minivan, SUV, and a wagon, and despite the R-Class being more upscale and sophisticated (based on a rear-wheel drive platform) with a better executed launch (while the Pacifica was plagued with production and marketing flaws), it has sold poorly compared to the GLK and M-Classes.

The Pacifica was widely praised for its carlike ride and handling, as its sophisticated suspension soaked up the bumps well, while the steering was fairly crisp and linear. However the 2004-06 model years of the Pacifica were fuel thirsty and vastly underpowered considering its hefty weight, with its weak 250 hp 3.5-liter V6 and aging four-speed automatic transmission, which gave poor performance considering the price of this vehicle. This was only rectified in 2007 with a new V6 engine and a new six-speed automatic which was nonetheless too late to salvage sales. Throughout its lifetime there were few engine options, yet despite client requests there was never an available Hemi or SRT version like the 2005 Chrysler 300.

=== Reliability ===
The initial production models of the Pacifica gave the nameplate a bad reputation, due to poor mechanical reliability of the transmission and engine, liner and interior flaws, electrical glitches, and low build quality. Furthermore, Chrysler was slow to react in fixing these problems.

== Total Sales ==
Calendar year	USA	Canada	México
2003	56,656	N/A	
2004	92,363	5,119	
2005	85,557	3,944	855
2006	78,243	3,876	779
2007	53,947	2,016	447
2008	7,345	290	71
2009	1,955	2	6
Subtotal	376,066	15,247	2,158
Total 393,471
