= Chrysler Pentastar engine =

Pentastar engine
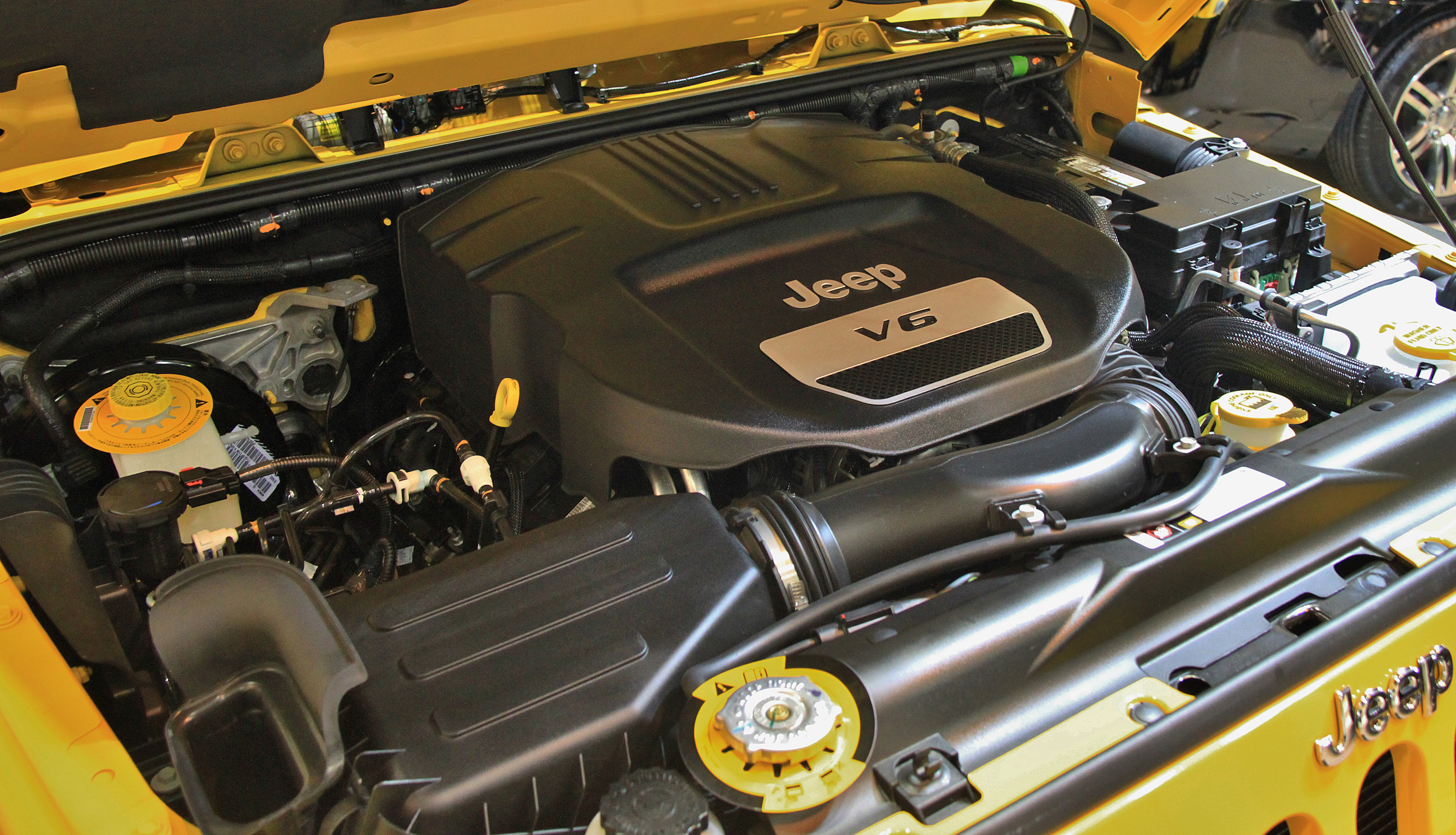

Overview
- Manufacturer: Stellantis North America
- Production: 2010–present

Layout
- Configuration: 60° V6
- Displacement: 3.0 L; 182.9 cu in (2,997 cc); 3.2 L; 197.7 cu in (3,239 cc); 3.6 L; 219.9 cu in (3,604 cc)
- Cylinder bore: 91 mm (3.58 in) (3.2L); 96 mm (3.78 in) (3.6L)
- Piston stroke: 76 mm (2.99 in) (3.0L); 83 mm (3.27 in) (3.2L & 3.6L)
- Cylinder block material: Aluminium
- Cylinder head material: Aluminium
- Valvetrain: DOHC 4 valves per cyl. (24 total)
- Valvetrain drive system: Timing chain
- Compression ratio: 10.7:1 (3.2L); 10.2:1 (3.6L); 11.3:1 (Upgrade)

Combustion
- Fuel system: Sequential MPFI
- Fuel type: Gasoline; E85
- Oil system: Wet sump
- Cooling system: Water-cooled

Output
- Power output: 230 hp (172 kW) (3.0L); 271 hp (202 kW) (3.2L); 275–305 hp (205–227 kW) (3.6L)
- Torque output: 210 lb⋅ft (285 N⋅m) at 4400 rpm (3.0L); 239 lb⋅ft (324 N⋅m) at 4400 rpm (3.2L); 251–269 lb⋅ft (340–365 N⋅m) (3.6L)

Dimensions
- Length: 503 mm (19.8 in)

Chronology
- Predecessor: Chrysler SOHC V6; Chrysler 3.3 & 3.8 engine Chrysler LH engine Chrysler Powertech V6
- Successor: 2.0L Hurricane 4 EVO turbo I4 (For Chrysler, Dodge, and Jeep brands in 2026)

The Chrysler Pentastar engine family is a series of aluminium (die-cast cylinder block) dual overhead cam 24-valve gasoline V6 engines introduced for the 2011 model year in Chrysler, Dodge, Ram and Jeep vehicles. The engine was initially named "Phoenix," but the name was changed before the official launch due to a trademark conflict; the Pentastar name is derived from the trademark of the former Chrysler Corporation, which dates back to 1963. It will eventually be replaced by the Hurricane 4 EVO engine as the main corporate engine for Stellantis North America.

== Production ==
The Pentastar engines are made in three different factories: Dundee Engine Plant, Trenton Engine Plant and Saltillo South Engine Plant.

The Pentastar engine was introduced at the 2009 New York Auto Show. The engine design allows the use of E85 or 87 octane fuel and features dual variable valve timing. Forced induction, and cylinder deactivation options were engineered into the engine design, but have not been implemented from the factory, remaining "on the shelf" as of 2016.

Insiders initially reported that the engine would come in four basic sizes (3.0, 3.3, 3.6, and 4.0 L), each offered in various states of tune. The 3.3 L and 4.0 L have been dropped from the list and a 3.2L added, while Fiat's investor website, as of December 2011, specifies the 3.0 L with Fiat's MultiAir technology. The 3.6 L engine itself has different power ratings in different vehicles, and has higher output 305 hp (227 kW; 309 PS) and 269 pound force-feet (365 N⋅m) of torque when applied in the Dodge Challenger.

Single and Twin-turbocharged variants had been planned for 2015. These engines were projected to produce around 370 and 420 hp (276 and 313 kW; 375 and 426 PS), respectively. Direct injection was also planned.

Due to the new ownership structure, Fiat has obtained the right to use these engines, and had adopted them in the larger models of Lancia and Fiat brands.

== First generation ==
=== Applications ===
==== 3.0 L ====
- 2014–2022 Jeep Grand Cherokee (China, Russia)
- 2014–present Jeep Wrangler (China)
- 2014–2023 Chrysler 300C (China)

==== 3.2 L ====
- 2014–2022 Jeep Cherokee

==== 3.6 L ====
- 2011–2017 Chrysler 200 (Models: LX, Touring, Limited, S, and C)
- 2011–2016 Chrysler Town & Country (Models: LX, Touring, Touring "L", Limited, S, Limited Platinum)
- 2011–2014 Dodge Avenger (Models: SE V6, SXT, R/T)
- 2011–2023 Dodge Challenger (Models: SE, SXT, SXT +, SXT Rallye Edition, GT)
- 2011–2023 Dodge Charger (Models: SE, SXT, SXT +, SXT Rallye Edition, GT)
- 2011–present Dodge Durango (Models: Express, SXT, Crew, Crew Lux, Citadel, ACT Plus, Limited, GT)
- 2011–2020 Dodge Grand Caravan (Models: SE American Value Package (AVP) or Canadian Value Package (CVP), SE, Crew, Crew Lux, SXT, R/T, SE Plus, SXT Plus, GT)
- 2011–2019 Dodge Journey (Models: SE American Value Package (AVP) or Canadian Value Package (CVP), Mainstreet, Crew, Crew Lux, SXT, R/T, GT, Crossroad)
- 2011-present Jeep Grand Cherokee (Models: Laredo "E", Laredo "X", 70TH Anniversary Edition, Trailhawk, Altitude Edition, Limited, Overland, Overland Summit Edition)
- 2011–2014 Volkswagen Routan (Models: S, SE, SEL, SEL Premium)
- 2011–2023 Chrysler 300 (Models: 300 Base, 300 S V6, 300 C w/ V6, 300 C Glacier Series w/ V6, 300 C Luxury Series w/ V6)
- 2012–2018 Jeep Wrangler JK (Models: Sport, Unlimited Sport, Sport "S", Unlimited Sport "S", Freedom Edition, Unlimited Freedom Edition, Altitude Edition, Unlimited Altitude Edition, 70TH Anniversary Edition, Unlimited 70TH Anniversary Edition, Sahara, Hard Rock Edition, Unlimited Sahara, Moab, Unlimited Moab, Rubicon, Unlimited Rubicon, Rubicon 10TH Anniversary, Unlimited Rubicon 10TH Anniversary) Jeep Rubicon Recon 2017
- 2019-present Jeep Wrangler JL (Models: Sport, Willys Sport, Sport S, Islander, Willys, 80th Anniversary (2021), Freedom, Sport Altitude, Unlimited RHD, Sahara, Rubicon, Sahara Altitude, High Altitude
- 2020-present Jeep Gladiator JT (Models: Sport, Willys Sport (2021), Sport S, Willys (2021), Overland, Freedom, 80th Anniversary (2021), Rubicon, Mojave, High Altitude, California Edition (California dealer only), Texas Trail (Texas dealer only)
- 2011–2015 Ram Cargo Van (Models: C/V Base, C/V Tradesman)
- 2012–2015 Lancia Voyager (Models: Limited)
- 2012–2014 Lancia Thema
- 2012–2015 Fiat Freemont
- 2012–present Ram 1500 (Models: Tradesman, SLT, HFE)
- 2013–2021 Ram ProMaster
- 2014–2017 Chrysler 200 (295-hp, 262-lb ft)
- 2017–present Chrysler Pacifica (287-hp, 262-lb ft) (Hybrid: 260-hp combined, 230-lb ft)
- 2020–present Chrysler Voyager (287-hp, 262-lb ft)

=== Versions ===
Code	Displacement	Bore	Stroke	Years	Power SAE	Torque SAE
	3.0 L; 182.9 cu in (2,997 cc)	91 mm (3.58 in)	76 mm (2.99 in)	2013–	172 kW (234 PS) at 6350 rpm	285 N⋅m (210 lb⋅ft) at 4400 rpm
S	3.2 L; 197.7 cu in (3,239 cc)	91 mm (3.58 in)	83 mm (3.27 in)	2014–	271 bhp (202 kW; 275 PS) at 6750 rpm (Cherokee)	239 lb⋅ft (324 N⋅m) at 4400 rpm
G	3.6 L; 219.9 cu in (3,604 cc)	96 mm (3.78 in)	83 mm (3.27 in)	2010–	283 bhp (211 kW; 287 PS) at 6400 rpm (Avenger, Grand Caravan, Journey, Town & Country, 200, Routan)	260 lb⋅ft (353 N⋅m) at 4800 rpm
G	3.6 L; 219.9 cu in (3,604 cc)	96 mm (3.78 in)	83 mm (3.27 in)	2010–	290 bhp (216 kW; 294 PS) at 6350 rpm (Grand Cherokee, Durango)	260 lb⋅ft (353 N⋅m) at 4800 rpm
G	3.6 L; 219.9 cu in (3,604 cc)	96 mm (3.78 in)	83 mm (3.27 in)	2010–	292 bhp (218 kW; 296 PS) at 6350 rpm (Charger, 300)	260 lb⋅ft (353 N⋅m) at 4800 rpm
G	3.6 L; 219.9 cu in (3,604 cc)	96 mm (3.78 in)	83 mm (3.27 in)	2010–	305 bhp (227 kW; 309 PS) at 6350 rpm (Challenger)	268 lb⋅ft (363 N⋅m) at 4800 rpm
G	3.6 L; 219.9 cu in (3,604 cc)	96 mm (3.78 in)	83 mm (3.27 in)	2012–	285 bhp (213 kW; 289 PS) at 6400 rpm (Wrangler)	260 lb⋅ft (353 N⋅m) at 4800 rpm
G	3.6 L; 219.9 cu in (3,604 cc)	96 mm (3.78 in)	83 mm (3.27 in)	2013–	300 bhp (224 kW; 304 PS) at 6350 rpm (Charger Rallye Group, 300S)	264 lb⋅ft (358 N⋅m) at 4800 rpm
G	3.6 L; 219.9 cu in (3,604 cc)	96 mm (3.78 in)	83 mm (3.27 in)	2013–	305 bhp (227 kW; 309 PS) at 6400 rpm (RAM 1500)	269 lb⋅ft (365 N⋅m) at 4175 rpm
G	3.6 L; 219.9 cu in (3,604 cc)	96 mm (3.78 in)	83 mm (3.27 in)	2015– 2016	295 bhp (220 kW; 299 PS) at 6350 rpm (Chrysler 200)	262 lb⋅ft (355 N⋅m) at 4250 rpm
G	3.6 L; 219.9 cu in (3,604 cc)	96 mm (3.78 in)	83 mm (3.27 in)	2012-	280 PS (206 kW) at 6350 rpm (Fiat Freemont)	342 N⋅m (252 lb⋅ft) at 4350 rpm
G	3.6 L; 219.9 cu in (3,604 cc)	96 mm (3.78 in)	83 mm (3.27 in)	2012-	283 PS (208 kW) at 6600 rpm (Lancia Voyager)	344 N⋅m (254 lb⋅ft) at 4000 rpm
G	3.6 L; 219.9 cu in (3,604 cc)	96 mm (3.78 in)	83 mm (3.27 in)	2012-	286 PS (210 kW) at 6350 rpm (Lancia Thema)	340 N⋅m (251 lb⋅ft) at 4650 rpm

== Pentastar upgrade ==
For 2016, FCA released an updated version of the 3.6 L engine. This engine features upgrades to the variable valve timing (VVT) system, two-stage variable valve lift (VVL), a new intake manifold, new valve springs, new piston rings, new fuel injectors, new ignition coils, a cooled Exhaust gas recirculation system, lower internal friction and lower weight. It also features a higher compression ratio, increased from 10.2:1 to 11.3:1. These improvements increase power as well as efficiency, however the new version no longer supports flex-fuel capability.

Code	Displacement	Bore	Stroke	Power SAE	Torque SAE
G	3.6 L; 219.9 cu in (3,604 cc)	96 mm (3.78 in)	83 mm (3.27 in)	305 hp (227 kW; 309 PS)	269 lb⋅ft (365 N⋅m)

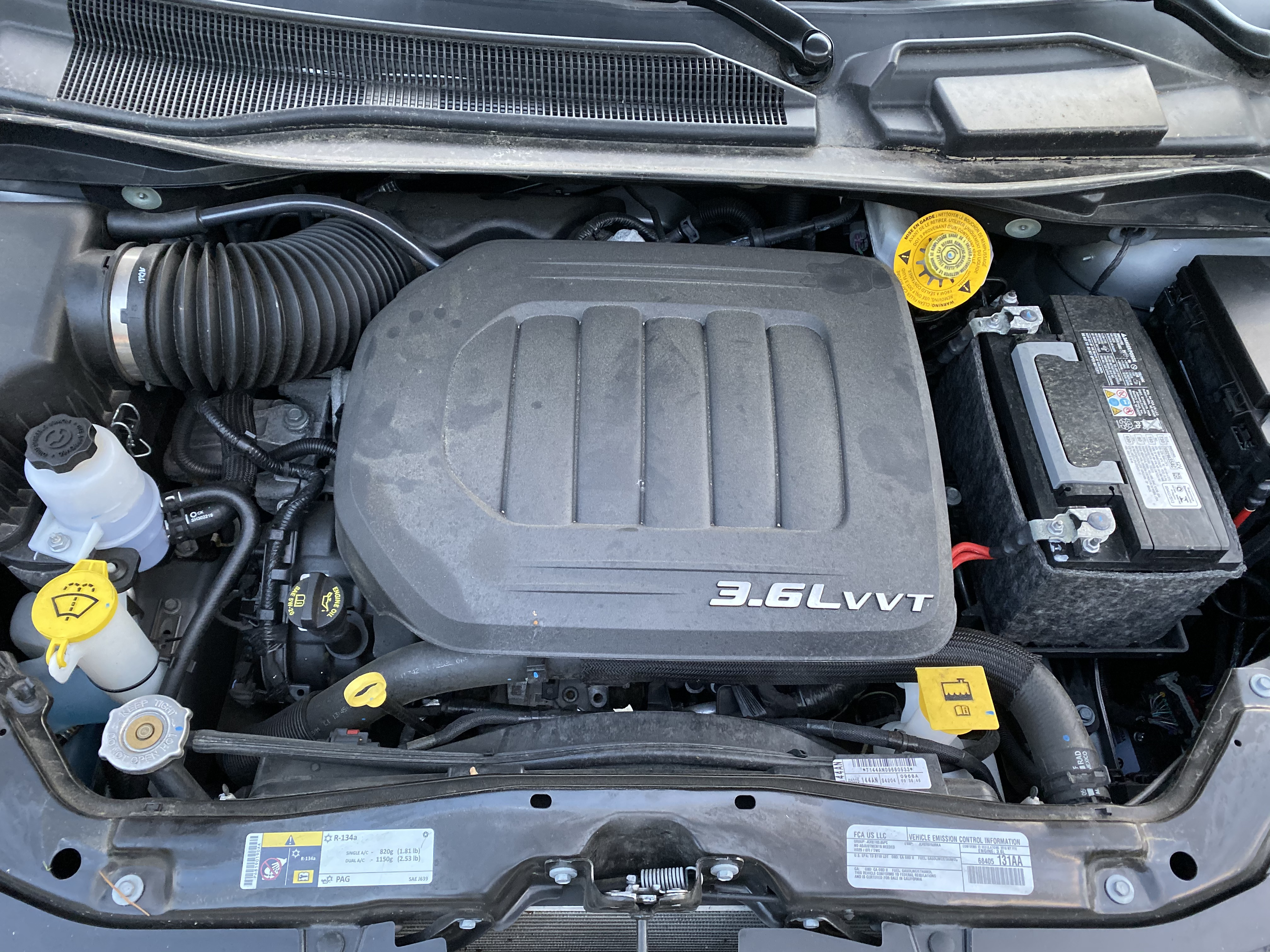
3.6 L VVT in a 2018 Dodge Grand Caravan

=== Applications ===
The 3.6 produced 295 hp also in the 2015 engine across Chrysler, Ram, Jeep and Dodge models, but the 2015 3.6 also supported flex-fuel option

- 2016–present Jeep Grand Cherokee (295 hp)
- 2016–present Dodge Durango (295 hp)
- 2017–present Chrysler Pacifica
- 2018–present Jeep Wrangler Unlimited JL
- 2019–present Ram 1500
- 2020–present Chrysler Voyager
- 2020–present Jeep Gladiator (JT) (280 hp)
- 2022–present Ram Promaster (280 hp)
- 2015-2017 chylser 200 (295hp)

== See also ==
- List of Chrysler engines
