= Chrysler Citadel =

Overview
- Manufacturer: Chrysler
- Production: 1999

Body and chassis
- Class: Concept car
- Body style: 4-door minivan
- Layout: 4WD

Powertrain
- Engine: 3.5 L EGG V6
- Electric motor: 1x Siemens electric motor, front-mounted
- Transmission: 4-speed automatic

The Chrysler Citadel was a concept car created by Chrysler. It was shown at the 2000 Washington DC Auto Show. The Citadel was a hybrid with good performance and the inspiration for the production-model Pacifica.

The Citadel name was later used for a trim level on the Dodge Durango.

== Specifications and performance ==
The Citadel is powered by a 189 kW (253-hp), 3.5-L V6 gasoline engine in the rear wheels and an electric one in the front wheels paired with a 4-speed automatic transmission. This combination of powers gives better performance in the rear. The gasoline engine gives out 253 horsepower (189 kW) and an extra 70 horsepower (52 kW) from the electric motor.
