= Chrysler Pacifica (minivan) =

American minivan

Chrysler Pacifica (RU)
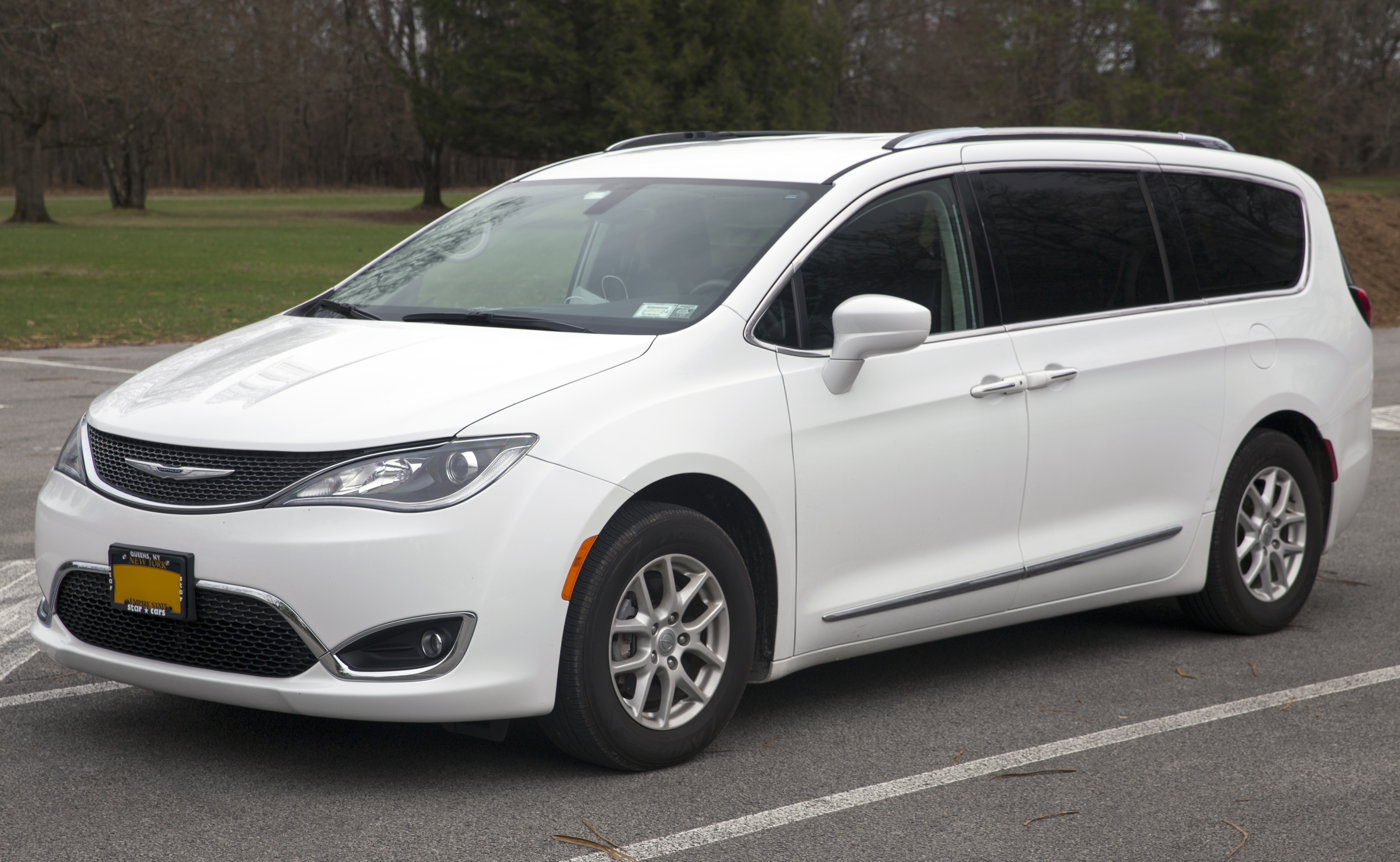
- Pre-facelift model

Overview
- Manufacturer: Chrysler (Stellantis North America (Note: FCA US LLC (2016–2021)))
- Also called: Chrysler Voyager (US, 2020–2026; fleet only 2022–2024); Chrysler Grand Caravan (Canada, 2021–present)
- Production: 2016–present
- Model years: 2017–present
- Assembly: Canada: Windsor, Ontario (Windsor Assembly)
- Designer: Irina Zavatski; Winnie Cheung (interior)

Body and chassis
- Class: Minivan
- Body style: 5-door minivan
- Layout: Front-engine, front-wheel drive; Front-engine, all-wheel drive
- Platform: Fiat-Chrysler RU
- Related: Chrysler 200

Powertrain
- Engine: 3.6 L Pentastar V6 (gasoline)
- Electric motor: 2x electric motors (SiEVT main motor & motor generator; PHEV) (2017-2026)
- Transmission: 9-speed 948TE automatic e-CVT
- Hybrid drivetrain: PHEV (Pacifica Hybrid)
- Battery: 16 kWh lithium-ion
- Electric range: 33 mi (53 km) (EPA)

Dimensions
- Wheelbase: 121.6 in (3,089 mm)
- Length: 203.6 in (5,171 mm)
- Width: 79.6 in (2,022 mm)
- Height: 69.9–70.7 in (1,775–1,796 mm)
- Curb weight: 4,330 lb (1,964 kg); 4,987 lb (2,262 kg) (hybrid)

Chronology
- Predecessor: Chrysler Town & Country/Dodge Caravan (RT)

The Chrysler Pacifica is a minivan produced by the Chrysler division of Stellantis since the 2017 model year. Replacing the Chrysler Town & Country, the Pacifica is the sixth generation of Chrysler minivans, taking its name from the namesake 2004–2008 crossover SUV of the same name. Along with serving as the first minivan with a plug-in hybrid drivetrain, the Pacifica has also served as a platform for autonomous vehicle development.

For the 2020 model year, Chrysler rebranded the lower-trim versions of the Pacifica as under the revived name Chrysler Voyager, largely to expand fleet sales of the model line. Following the retirement of the Dodge Grand Caravan after 2020, the nameplate was shifted from Dodge to the Chrysler after 36 years (serving as the Canadian equivalent of Chrysler Voyager). Following the retirement of the Chrysler 300 sedan, the Pacifica has become the sole remaining vehicle line assembled by Chrysler; as part of its 2027 model update, the Voyager name was retired (for a third time) in the United States.

Chrysler Canada assembles the Pacifica alongside the Chrysler Grand Caravan in its Windsor Assembly facility (Windsor, Ontario), home to Chrysler minivan assembly since 1983.

== History ==
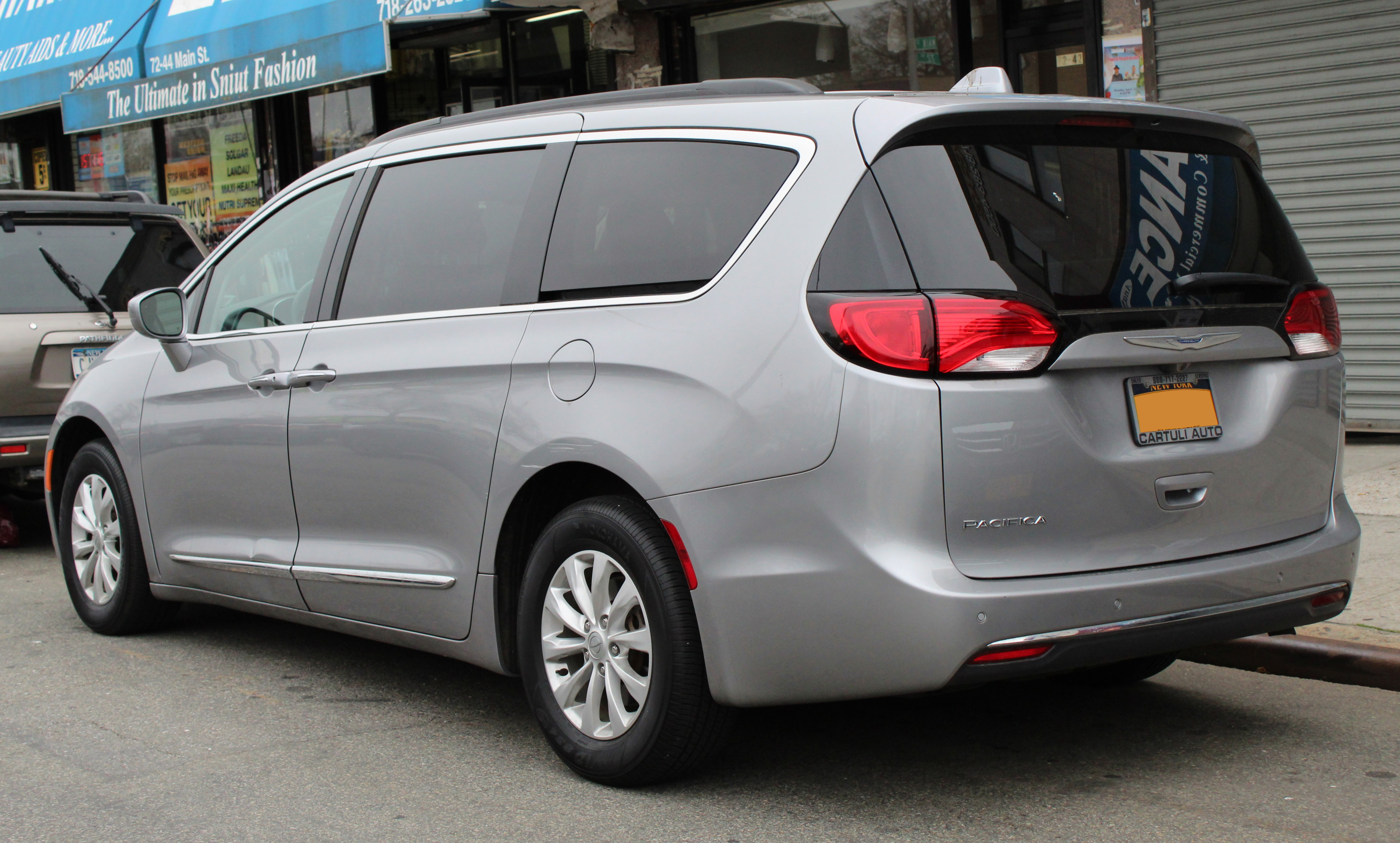
Rear view

=== Development ===
In June 2013, it was reported that Chrysler was preparing to produce a new generation of its Town & Country minivan at the Windsor Assembly Plant, with production set to begin in 2015 and a release for the 2017 model year. An industry analyst reported that the new version would possibly be a crossover utility vehicle in the vein of the Pacifica.

In 2015, FCA CEO Sergio Marchionne announced that it would invest $2 billion in developing a new minivan, and overhauling the Windsor Assembly Plant to facilitate its production. A company issued plan of future vehicles revealed that a new Town & Country would begin production in February 2016 for the 2017 model year, and that the final-generation Dodge Grand Caravan would be maintained in parallel with the new Town & Country as a lower-cost option during the 2017 model year, after which it would be discontinued. Marchionne has been against "duplicate[d] investments" in product development, a strategy reflected by his reduction of badge-engineering between FCA US's domestic marques.

On November 3, 2015, FCA filed to have its trademark registration on the Pacifica brand renewed. FCA's Head of Passenger Car Brands Timothy Kuniskis denied that this was related to any new products, and that it was standard industry practice to continue renewing its trademarks because "you don't want to lose names. Establishing new names is expensive."

=== Model years ===
Chrysler debuted the new vehicle on January 11, 2016, at the 2016 North American International Auto Show. Rather than being named the Town & Country, the new vehicle was branded as the Pacifica. The decision to drop the Town & Country brand was made primarily to distinguish the new vehicle from previous iterations; director of Chrysler brand product marketing Bruce Velisek explained that the Pacifica was meant to "change the entire paradigm of what people know about minivans in the segment". Among its differences from the previous Town & Country is a new platform, and a design carrying a sportier appearance inspired by crossovers—a market segment that had cannibalized minivan sales—to disassociate the vehicle from other minivans with a boxier build. Chrysler also changed the minivan's sliding doors: they will be aluminum and hands-free, opening automatically when the fob holder waves under them.

The starting price of the 2017 Pacifica was US$28,595. This was US$1,400 less than the starting price of the 2016 Town & Country. The base model plug-in hybrid, called "Premium", started at US$41,995 and the high-end "Platinum" model started at US$44,995.

=== Plug-in hybrid ===
Debuting for the 2017 model year, the plug-in hybrid Pacifica was the first of its class in the United States. According to chief engineer Kevin Mets, meant to create an electric vehicle that could feasibly be a family's "primary vehicle". The Pacifica Hybrid has a 16 kWh battery pack, giving it 33 miles of range under electric power; the vehicle qualifies in the US for the full US$7,500 federal tax credit and also to other incentives at the state and local level.

In June 2017, Chrysler recalled 1,600 Pacificas to fix the electronics.

The plug-in hybrid was announced to have been discontinued in January 2026. A very short run of 2026 Pacifica plug-in hybrids were produced before the cancellation.

=== Autonomous version ===
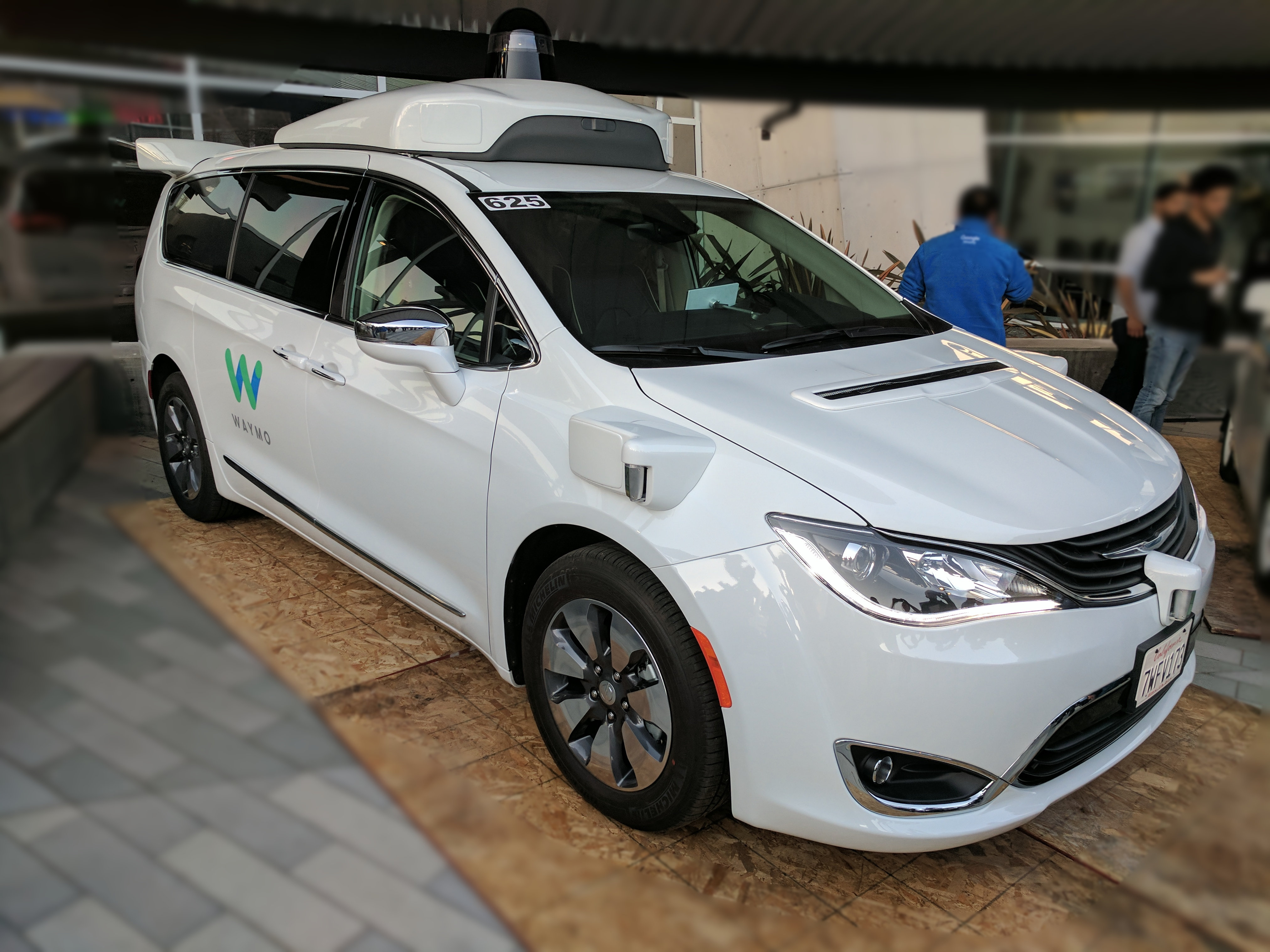
Waymo Pacifica driverless minivan

On November 7, 2017, Waymo announced that it had begun testing driverless cars without a safety driver at the driver position using the Pacifica plug-in.

=== AWD version ===
The AWD option was made available in June 2020 for 2020 Touring-L models equipped with the AWD Launch Edition package. The Pacifica is the only minivan in the North American market to feature a traditional AWD system as the fourth-generation Toyota Sienna has switched to the E-four system with the rear wheels driven electrically.

=== Chrysler Voyager ===
Starting with the 2020 model year, the low-end "L" and "LX" models have been separated from the Pacifica nameplate and are now sold under the Voyager nameplate in the United States. This marked the return of the Voyager nameplate to the Chrysler model lineup, in which it was last used in 2016, and the North American market, in which it was last used in 2003 in the U.S. and 2007 in Mexico. In addition to the L and LX trim levels, an "LXi" model is available to fleet customers.

In the 2021 model year, Canadian sales of the model started under the Chrysler Grand Caravan nameplate with trim level designations carried over from the outgoing Dodge Grand Caravan (as opposed to the former base Pacifica) and no equivalent to the LXi model. This marked the return of the "Chrysler Grand Caravan" nameplate which was last used in 2007, primarily in South American markets.

The Voyager was restricted in the United States to fleet buyers for the 2022 model year. It continues the pre-facelift design and includes a long list of features and equipment with only two options: (1) the "SafetyTec Group" (Advanced Brake Assist, Pedestrian Emergency Braking, Full-Speed Forward Collision Warning Plus, Uconnect 5 NAV with 10.1-inch Display, ParkSense Rear Park Assist System with Stop, and Blind Spot Monitoring with Rear Cross-Path Detection System) and (2) the "Fleet Security Group" (Two additional key fobs and SiriusXM Guardian trial). The Voyager made its return to retail sale for the 2025 model year, while still retaining the pre-facelift styling of the Pacifica.

The Voyager nameplate was discontinued for the 2027 model year, with the Pacifica LX trim level replacing it in the lineup.

=== 2021 refresh ===
A restyled 2021 Chrysler Pacifica was introduced at the 2020 Chicago Auto Show in Chicago, Illinois. The 2021 model year Pacifica featured new exterior styling and is now available with all-wheel-drive (AWD) for gasoline-powered models. The Pacifica Hybrid versions use front-wheel-drive.

Unlike previous AWD Chrysler minivans, the AWD Pacifica retains the Stow 'n' Go seating. It is the first Fiat Chrysler Automobiles vehicle to feature the new Android-based Uconnect 5 infotainment system with a standard 10.1-inch high-resolution touchscreen display and wireless Apple CarPlay and Android Auto smartphone integration, as well as Amazon Alexa capabilities, as well as SiriusXM Satellite Radio and high-speed data connectivity. USB-C high-speed data and charging ports are standard equipment, and TomTom-based GPS navigation is optional. The "FamCam" rear camera system can display an image of rear passengers in place of a conversation mirror.

A new Pinnacle trim level adds "Pinnacle" badging on the front doors, unique leather seat trim, quilted leather pillows for the second-row seats, and unique exterior styling cues. For model years 2023 and 2024, a special "Road Tripper" package was available on the Pacifica Touring L (also AWD and Hybrid models). This included a roof rack, cargo liner, a storage bin, and received blacked out trim with orange accents. For 2024 the Hybrid Road Tripper became a standalone model, while it remained a package on the regular-engined models.

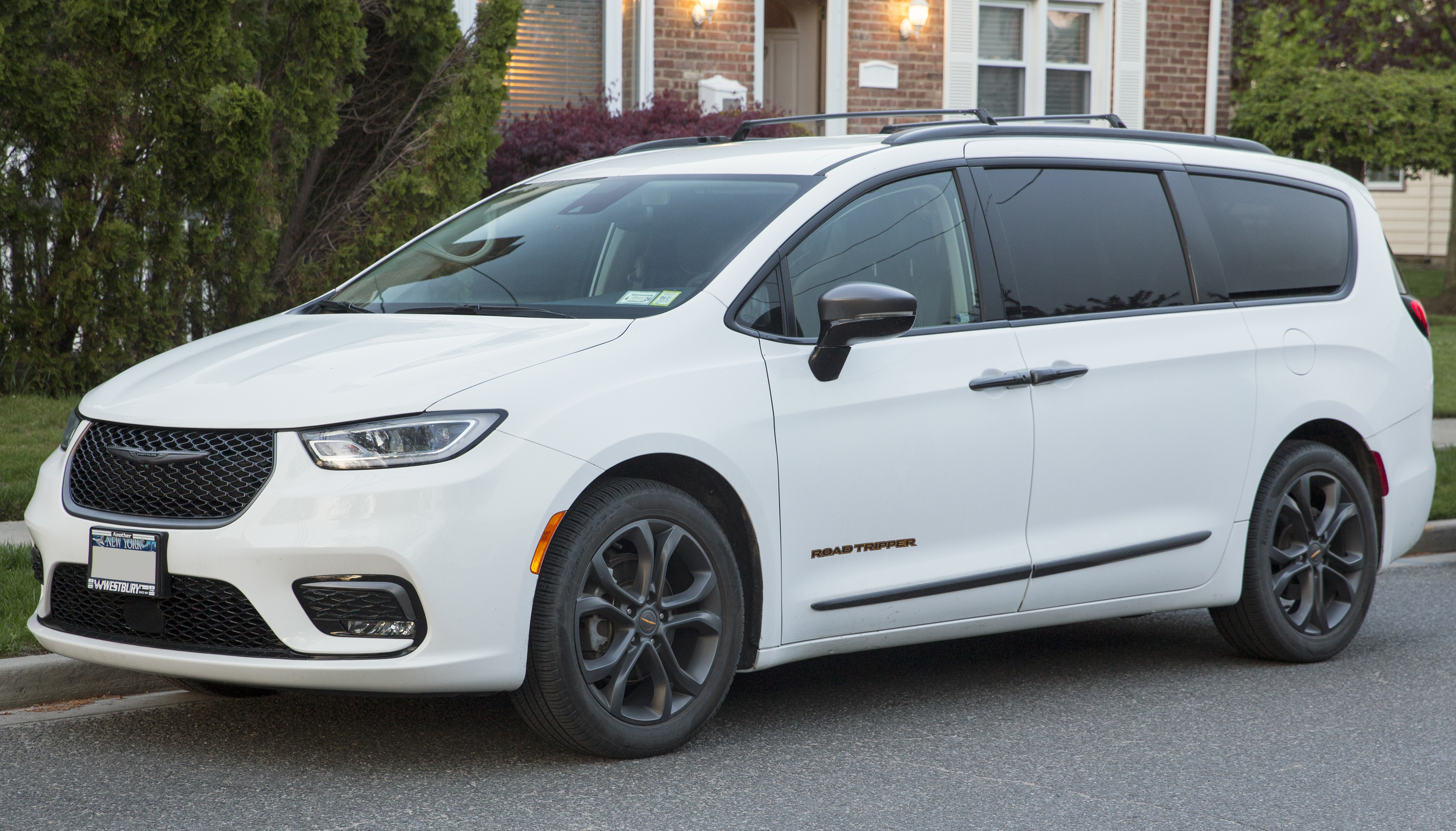
2024 Chrysler Pacifica Touring-L with the Road Tripper package

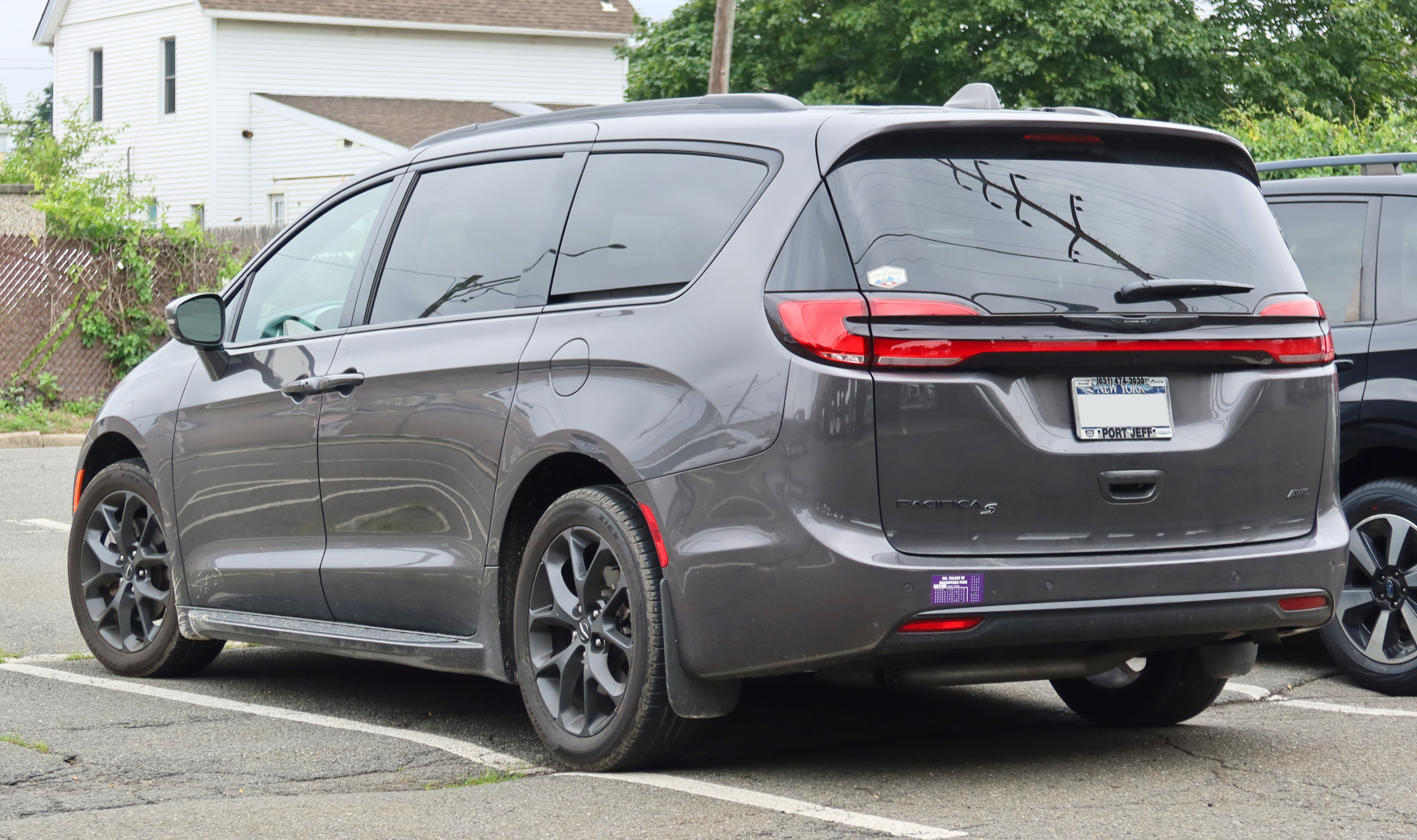
2021 Chrysler Pacifica Touring-L

=== 2027 refresh ===
The second facelift of the Pacifica was announced online on February 25, 2026. It features a new front fascia; it now has an LED light bar, with a new Chrysler logo taken from the Airflow concept and upside-down L-shaped headlights. It retains the 3.6-liter Pentastar V6, and keeps its optional AWD, alongside the Stow'n Go seating. The Voyager was reintegrated into the lineup with the reintroduction of the LX trim level for the Pacifica, but will continue to retain the original pre-facelift exterior styling. This updated Pacifica became available at dealers in late spring of 2026.

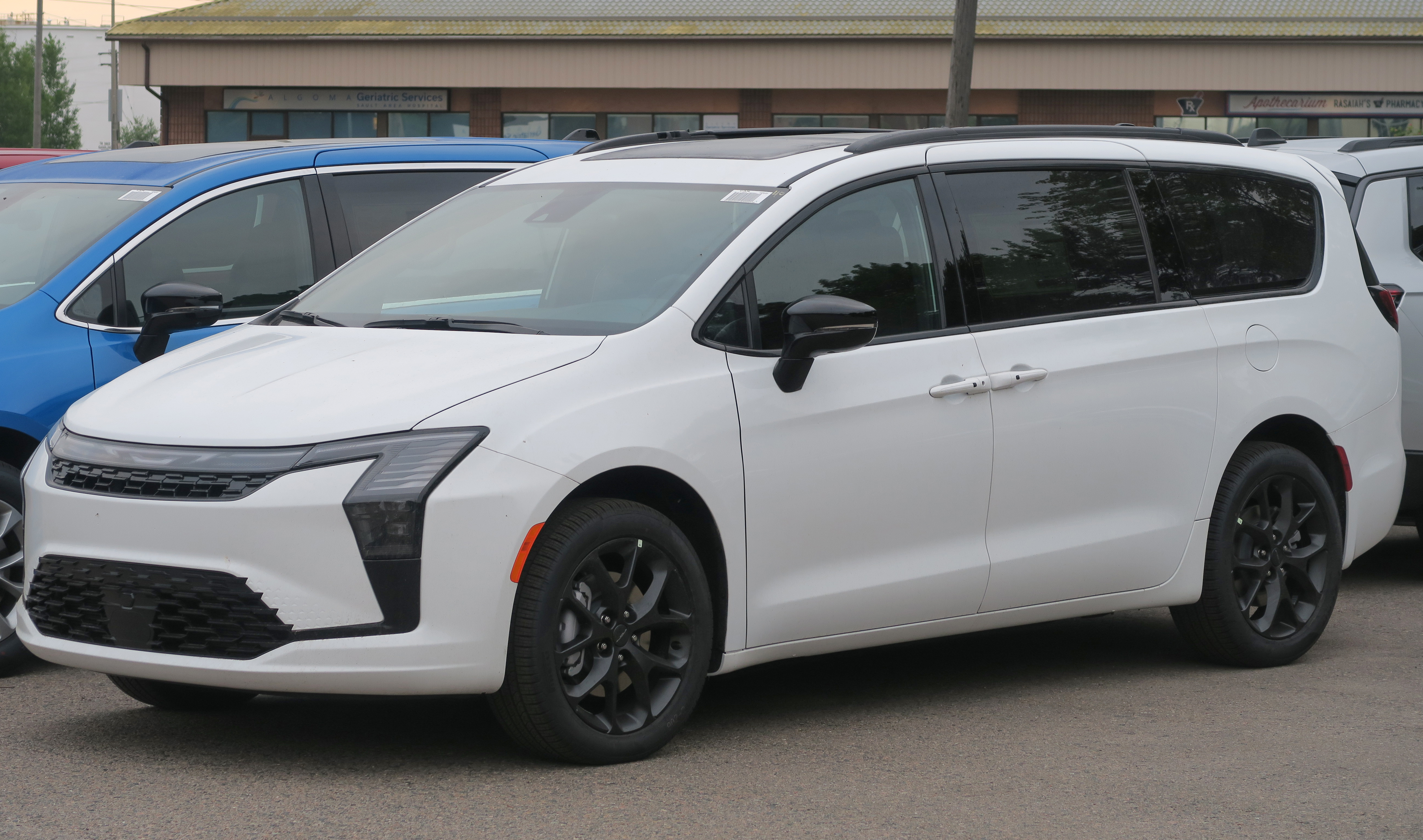
2027 Chrysler Pacifica Limited with S Appearance Package

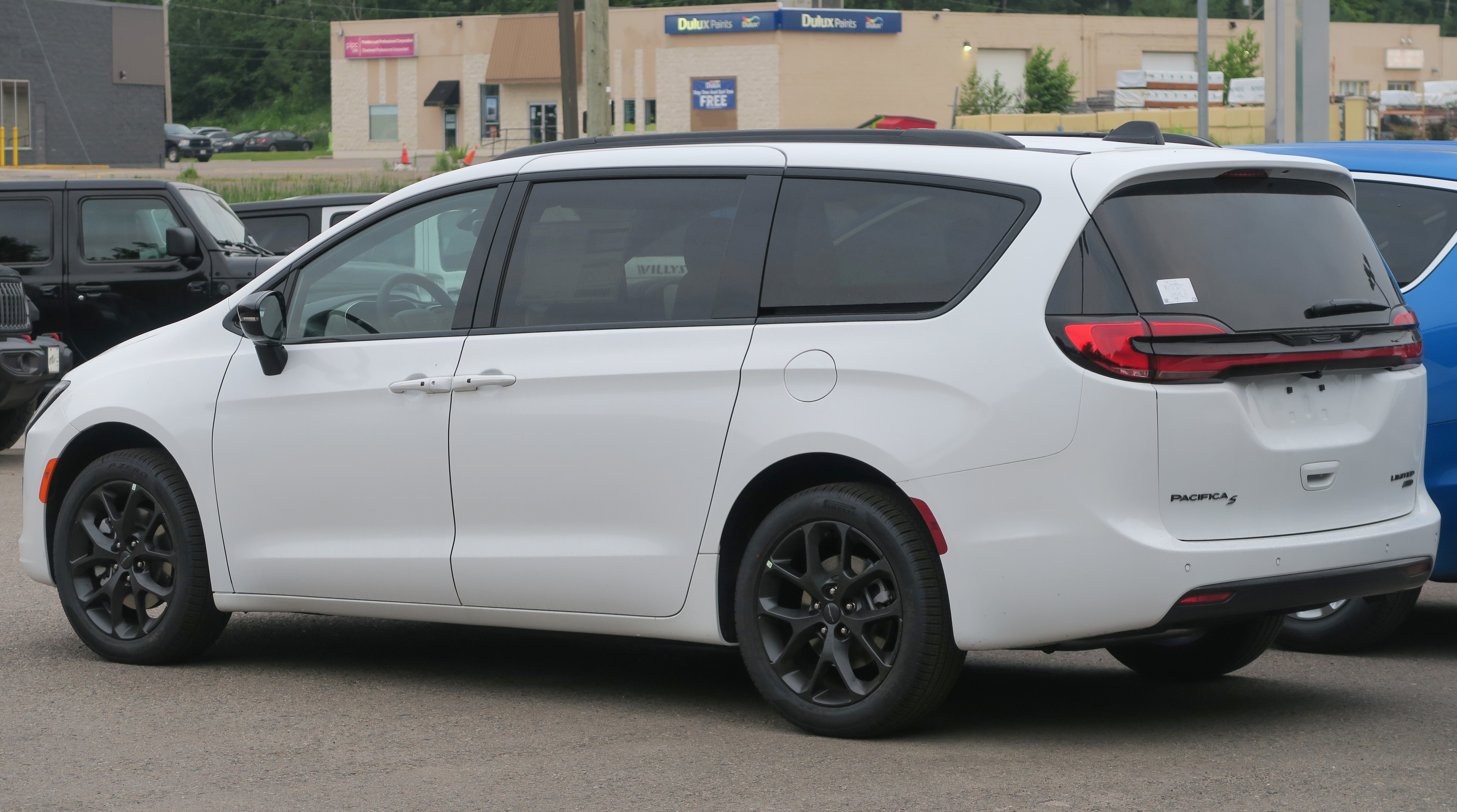
Rear view

== Production ==
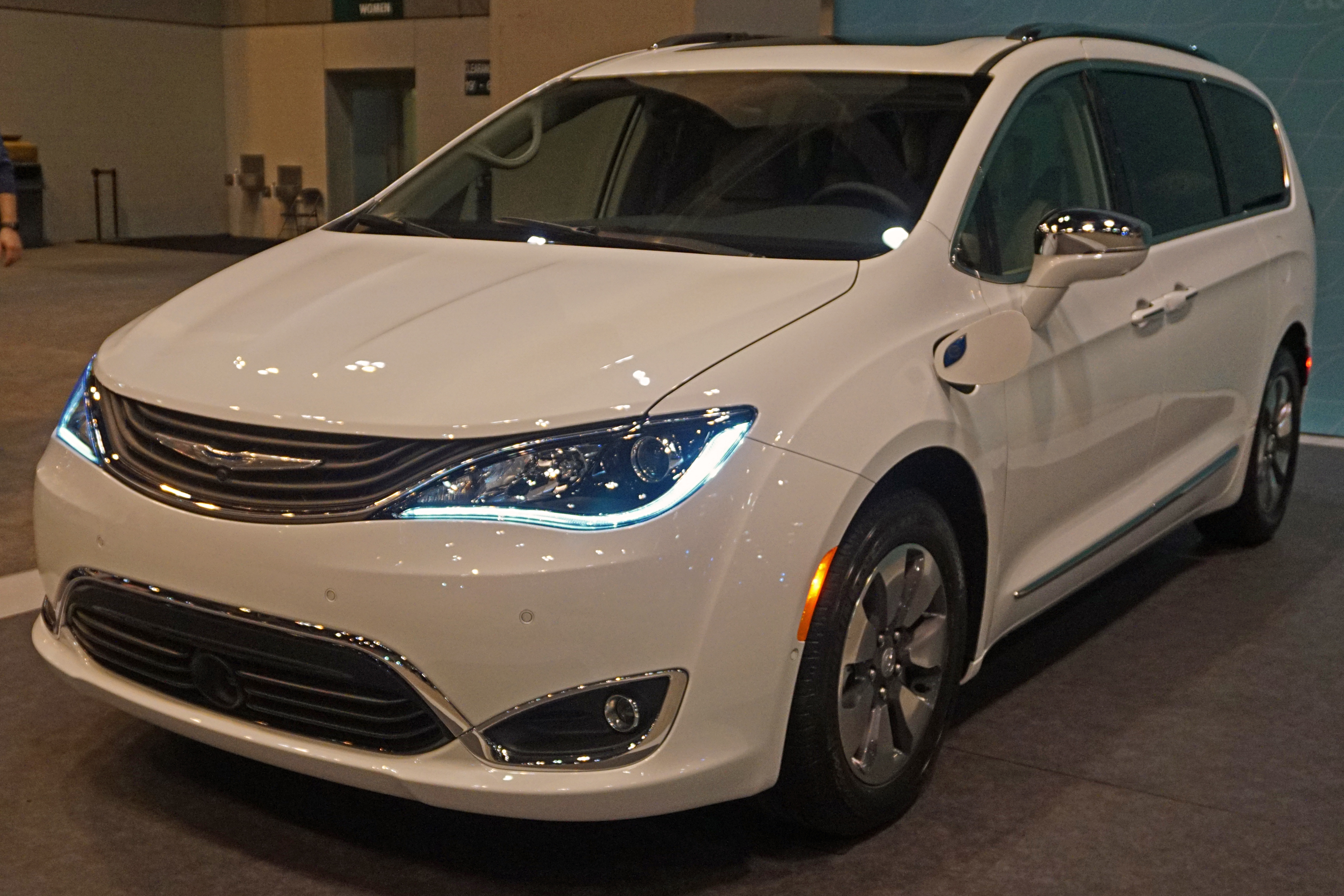
Pacifica Hybrid

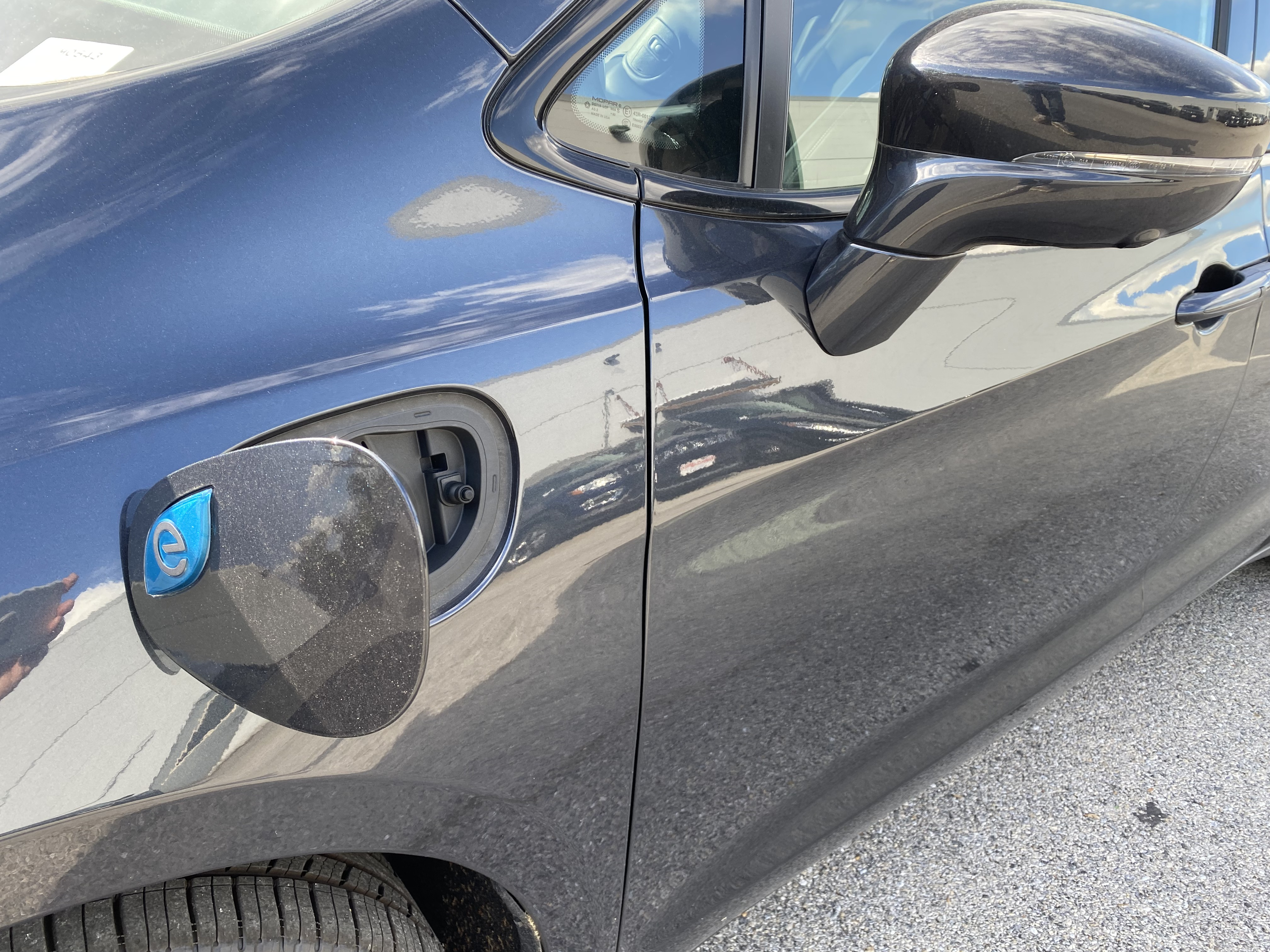
Charging port of the 2021 Chrysler Pacifica Hybrid

Production of the vehicle uses an all-new platform at the Windsor Plant in Windsor, Ontario, Canada.

=== Powertrains ===
The Pacifica uses a new revision of the 3.6 L Pentastar V6 engine, and is produced with two powertrains: gasoline-only and plug-in hybrid, the latter marketed as Pacifica Hybrid.

The plug-in hybrid version uses a 16-kWh lithium-ion battery, located under the floor under the second row of seats, with an all-electric range of 33 mi (53 km) before switching to the gasoline engine. The battery can be fully recharged in two hours using a 240-volt plug-in system. The hybrid is not available with all-wheel drive, eight-passenger seating, Stow'n Go seating, or vacuum.

The gasoline-only version of the Pacifica minivan went on sale in mid-2016; the plug-in hybrid version, in 2017. Chrysler expected the plug-in hybrid model to achieve a fuel economy of at least 80 miles per gallon equivalent, and on December 1, 2016, the EPA announced the minivan achieved 84 miles per gallon gasoline equivalent.

=== Fuel economy ===
The Pacifica Hybrid operating in hybrid mode had the highest fuel economy of any minivan available in the North American market until the introduction of the 2021 standard-hybrid fourth-generation Toyota Sienna.

The following table presents the U.S. EPA fuel economy ratings for all powertrain variants of the Chrysler Pacifica.

Fuel economy as rated by the U.S. Environmental Protection Agency (Fuel economy as displayed in the Monroney label)
| Vehicle | Model year | Operating mode (AER) | EPA fuel economy ratings | | | Notes |
| Vehicle | Model year | Operating mode (AER) | Combined | City | Highway | Notes |
|---|---|---|---|---|---|---|
| Chrysler Pacifica AWD | 2020 | Gasoline only | 20 mpg | 17 mpg | 25 mpg | |
| Chrysler Pacifica FWD | 2017 | Gasoline only | 22 mpg | 18 mpg | 28 mpg | |
| Chrysler Pacifica Hybrid | 2017 | Electricity only (33 mi) | 84 mpg-e^{(1)} (40 kWh/100 mi) | – | – | During the first 33 mi uses some gasoline. The actual all-electric range is between 0 and 33 mi. |
| Chrysler Pacifica Hybrid | 2017 | Gasoline only | 32 mpg | | | During the first 33 mi uses some gasoline. The actual all-electric range is between 0 and 33 mi. |
Notes: (1) Conversion 1 gallon of gasoline=33.7 kW-hr.

=== Safety ===
==== NHTSA ====
NHTSA 2017 Chrysler Pacifica VAN FWD:
| Overall: | 5/5 stars |
| Frontal Driver: | 5/5 stars |
| Frontal Passenger: | 5/5 stars |
| Side Driver: | 5/5 stars |
| Side Passenger: | 5/5 stars |
| Side Pole Driver: | 5/5 stars |
| Rollover: | / 11.6% |

==== IIHS ====
===== 2017 =====
The 2017 Pacifica was tested by the Insurance Institute for Highway Safety (IIHS), and its top trim received a Top Safety Pick+ award:

IIHS 2017 Chrysler Pacifica:
| Small overlap front (driver): | Good^{*} | |
| Small overlap front (passenger): | Acceptable^{*} | |
| Moderate overlap front | Good | |
| Side (original test) | Good | |
| Roof strength (2017–present models) | Good | |
| Head restraints & seats | Good | |
| Headlights | Acceptable / Marginal / Poor | varies by trim/option |
| Front crash prevention (Vehicle-to-Vehicle) | Superior | optional |
| Child seat anchors (LATCH) ease of use | Marginal / Poor | |

^{*} rating applies to models built after August 2016

===== 2022 =====
The 2022 Pacifica was tested by the Insurance Institute for Highway Safety (IIHS), and it received a Top Safety Pick+ award:

IIHS 2022 Chrysler Pacifica:
| Small overlap front (driver): | Good |
| Small overlap front (passenger): | Good |
| Moderate overlap front | Good |
| Side (original test) | Good |
| Roof strength | Good |
| Head restraints & seats | Good |
| Headlights | Acceptable |
| Front crash prevention (Vehicle-to-Vehicle) | Superior |
| Front crash prevention (Vehicle-to-Pedestrian, day) | Advanced |
| Child seat anchors (LATCH) ease of use | Acceptable |

===== 2023 =====
The 2023 Pacifica was tested In the IIHS' updated Moderate Overlap test, which now emphasizes rear occupant safety, and received a Marginal rating.

== Awards ==
As of December 2020, the Pacifica has earned 140 honors and industry accolades. Among them:

- "Best Minivan of 2016" by Cars.com
- 2017 "Best New Large Utility Vehicle" by the Automobile Journalists Association of Canada (AJAC)
- "2017 North American Utility of the Year" by a panel of automotive experts
- 2017 Family Vehicle of the Year by the Midwest Automotive Media Association
- "2017 Drivers’ Choice Award for Best Minivan" from MotorWeek
- "2017 Crossover-SUV of the Year" by the Rocky Mountain Automotive Press
- "Top Minivan of 2017" by New York Daily News Autos Team
- Best Minivan by Popular Mechanics as part of its 2017 Automotive Excellence Awards
- 2020 Pacifica Hybrid: Top Consumer Rated Van/Minivans of 2020 by Kelly Blue Book
- 2020 Best Family Car by Parents magazine as the "Best Eco Pick"
- 2021 Consumer Guide Best Buy award (for the fifth year in a row)
- 2021 Pacifica won the 2020 CarBuzz Family Fun award
- 2021 shortlisted for the 2021 Car of the Year by Motor Trend
- 2021 Good Housekeeping Best New Family Car: The Pacifica won this award in April
- 2022 Parents Best Family Car: The Pacifica has been named a Best Family Car by Parents for three consecutive years
- 2022 Chrysler Pacifica Hybrid has won the TAWA Auto Roundup's Best Minivan category.
- 2024 U.S. News & World Report Best Cars for Families awarded the Pacifica as the top minivan for families due to its roomy interior, numerous safety features, and special Stow 'n Go seating.

== Marketing ==
In April 2016, Chrysler launched a television advertising campaign for the Pacifica entitled "Dad Brand", featuring comedian Jim Gaffigan and his children. In October 2016, Chrysler launched a social media-oriented campaign known as "PacifiKids", featuring videos in which unsuspecting families shopped for the vehicle at a dealership staffed entirely by children. The Pacifica has also been used in cross-promotional campaigns for the films The Secret Life of Pets and Incredibles 2.

== Total sales ==
US sales include both the Pacifica and Voyager. Canada sales include both the Pacifica and Chrysler Grand Caravan.

| Calendar year | United States | Canada | Mexico | Europe |
|---|---|---|---|---|
| 2016 | 62,366 | 2,560 | 208 | 5 |
| 2017 | 118,274 | 6,185 | 634 | 57 |
| 2018 | 118,322 | 5,999 | 505 | 129 |
| 2019 | 97,705 | 3,731 | 465 | 117 |
| 2020 | 93,802 | 2,760 | 261 | 94 |
| 2021 | 98,323 | 7,226 | 266 | 103 |
| 2022 | 98,624 | 11,385 | 284 | |
| 2023 | 120,554 | 9,007 | | |
| 2024 | 119,389 | 10,129 | | |
| 2025 | 125,798 | 16,688 | | |
