= Chrysler minivans =

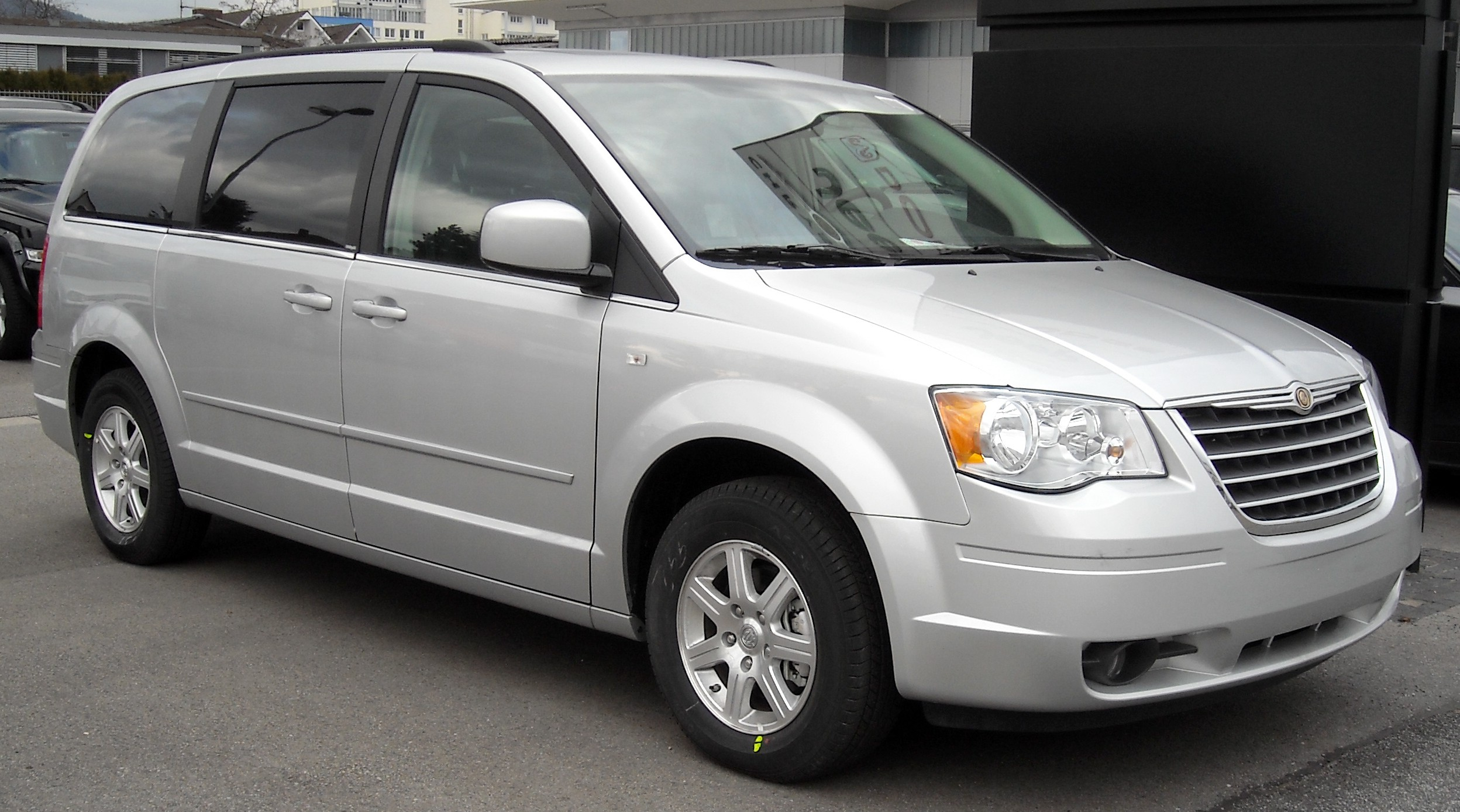
- 2009 Chrysler Grand Voyager (Fifth generation)

Overview
- Manufacturer: Chrysler Corporation (1984–1998); DaimlerChrysler AG (1998–2007); Chrysler LLC (2007–2009); Chrysler Group LLC (2009–2014); FCA US LLC (2014–2021); Stellantis USA LLC (2021–present)
- Production: 1983–present

Body and chassis
- Class: Minivan; Cargo van
- Body styles: 3-door van; 4-door van
- Vehicles: Dodge Caravan/Dodge Grand Caravan; Plymouth Voyager/Plymouth Grand Voyager; Chrysler Town & Country; Chrysler Pacifica; Chrysler Voyager/Chrysler Grand Voyager; Lancia Voyager; Volkswagen Routan

The Chrysler minivans are a series of minivans that have been produced and marketed by the American automaker Chrysler since the 1984 model year. Currently in its sixth generation, the model line is sold worldwide, primarily in North America and Europe. Introduced as the Dodge Caravan and Plymouth Voyager, the Chrysler minivans have been marketed under various nameplates across the Chrysler, Plymouth, Dodge, and Ram brands. Through the use of rebadging, the model line has also been marketed under the Lancia and Volkswagen brands in Continental Europe and North America respectively.

The introduction of the Chrysler minivans popularized the body styles by automakers in North America, leading to the introduction of competitive vehicles such as the Chevrolet Astro/GMC Safari, Ford Aerostar, Toyota Previa and Mazda MPV. During the 1990s, the popularity of the model line led to its form factor being closely adopted by many of its competitors, including the Ford Windstar/Freestar, Honda Odyssey, Toyota Sienna, and Nissan Quest.

Since 1983, Chrysler has manufactured minivans at its Windsor Assembly facility (Windsor, Ontario, Canada). From 1987 to 2007, the company supplemented production in North America with its Saint Louis Assembly facility (Fenton, Missouri). For the European market, exports were primarily augmented by the Eurostar joint venture factory in Graz, Austria, from 1992 through 2002. The highest-selling line of minivans worldwide, Chrysler produced the 15 millionth example of the model line in 2019.

== Table of models ==
Model	Generation (Platform)					
Model	1st (S)	2nd (AS)	3rd (NS)	4th (RS)	5th (RT)	6th (RU)
Chrysler Voyager	Yes					Yes
Chrysler Grand Voyager		Yes				
Chrysler Town & Country	Yes					
Chrysler TEVan		Yes				
Chrysler Pacifica (crossover)				Yes		
Chrysler Pacifica (minivan)						Yes
Chrysler Grand Caravan						Yes
Dodge Caravan	Yes					
Dodge Grand Caravan	Yes					
Dodge Mini Ram Van	Yes					
Dodge Caravan C/V	Yes					
Dodge Caravan EPIC			Yes			
Dodge Ram Van			Yes			
Lancia Voyager					Yes	
Plymouth Voyager	Yes					
Plymouth Voyager EPIC			Yes			
Plymouth Grand Voyager	Yes					
Ram Cargo Van					Yes	
Volkswagen Routan					Yes	

== First generation (1984–1990) ==
First generation (S)
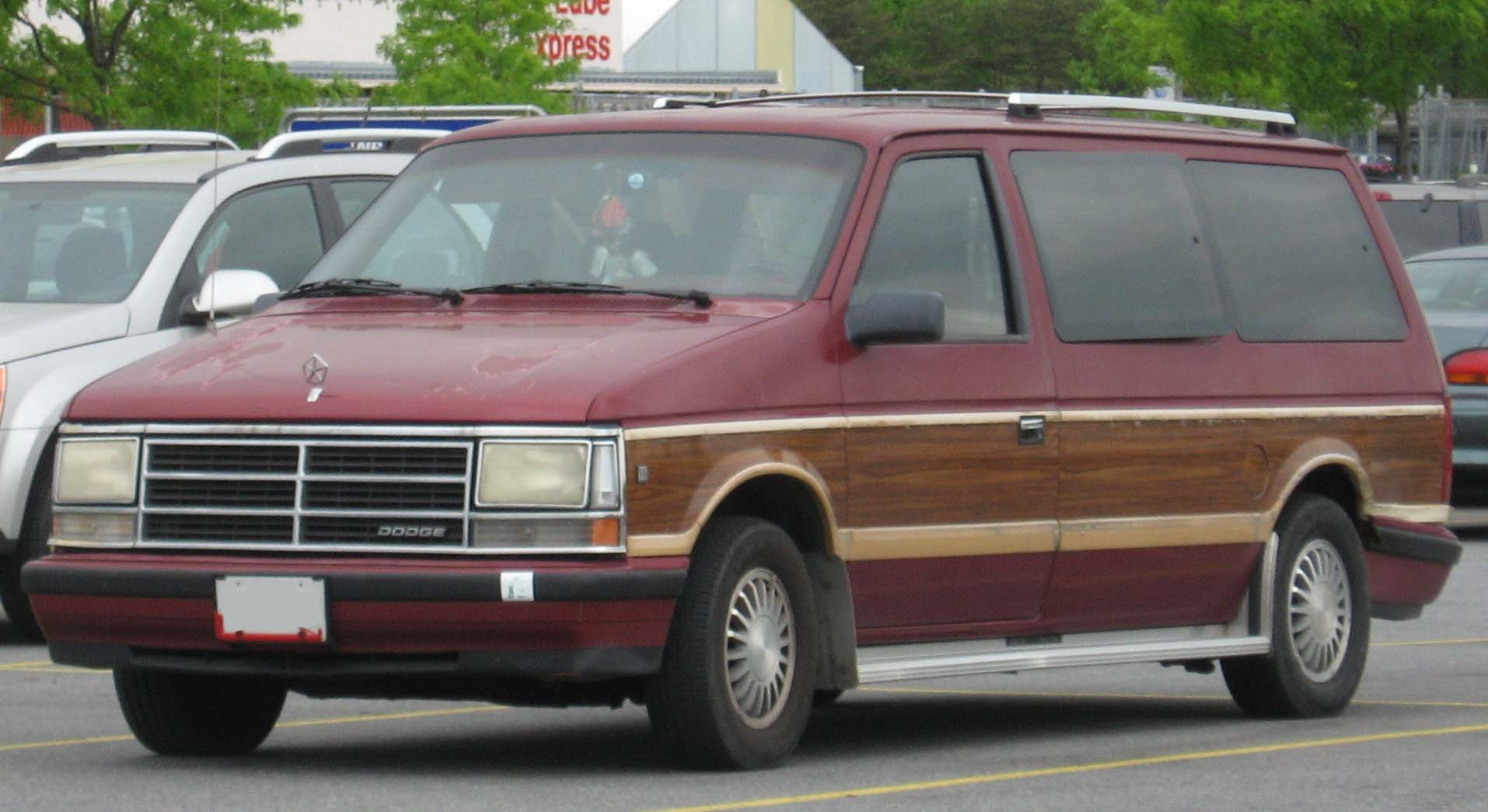
- 1987–1990 Dodge Grand Caravan LE V6

Overview
- Production: 1983–1990
- Model years: 1984–1990

Body and chassis
- Class: Minivan; Cargo van
- Body style: 4-door van
- Platform: Chrysler S platform

The first-generation Chrysler minivans were released in November 1983 as 1984 models. The Dodge Caravan was a new nameplate, with the Plymouth Voyager adopted from its previous full-size van line. The model lines were built on the front-wheel drive Chrysler S platform. To streamline production and development costs, the S platform, although a distinct design, shared powertrain commonality with the K platform and its variants. Additionally, some interior components were also shared with other Chrysler vehicles.

For the 1987 model year, Chrysler introduced the extended-length Dodge Grand Caravan and Plymouth Grand Voyager, which used a long-wheelbase version of the S platform chassis. For 1988, the Chrysler Voyager was introduced for European export. Alongside the passenger van, the model line was sold by Dodge as a cargo van; from 1984 to 1988, it was known as the Dodge Mini Ram Van, and from 1989 to 1990, it was referred to as the Dodge (Grand) Caravan C/V.

Chrysler added a minivan to its namesake brand early in 1990, shifting the Chrysler Town & Country nameplate from its traditional station wagon usage to a minivan. Sold exclusively in a long-wheelbase version, the Town & Country became the highest-trim Chrysler minivan.

== Second generation (1991–1995) ==
Second generation (AS)
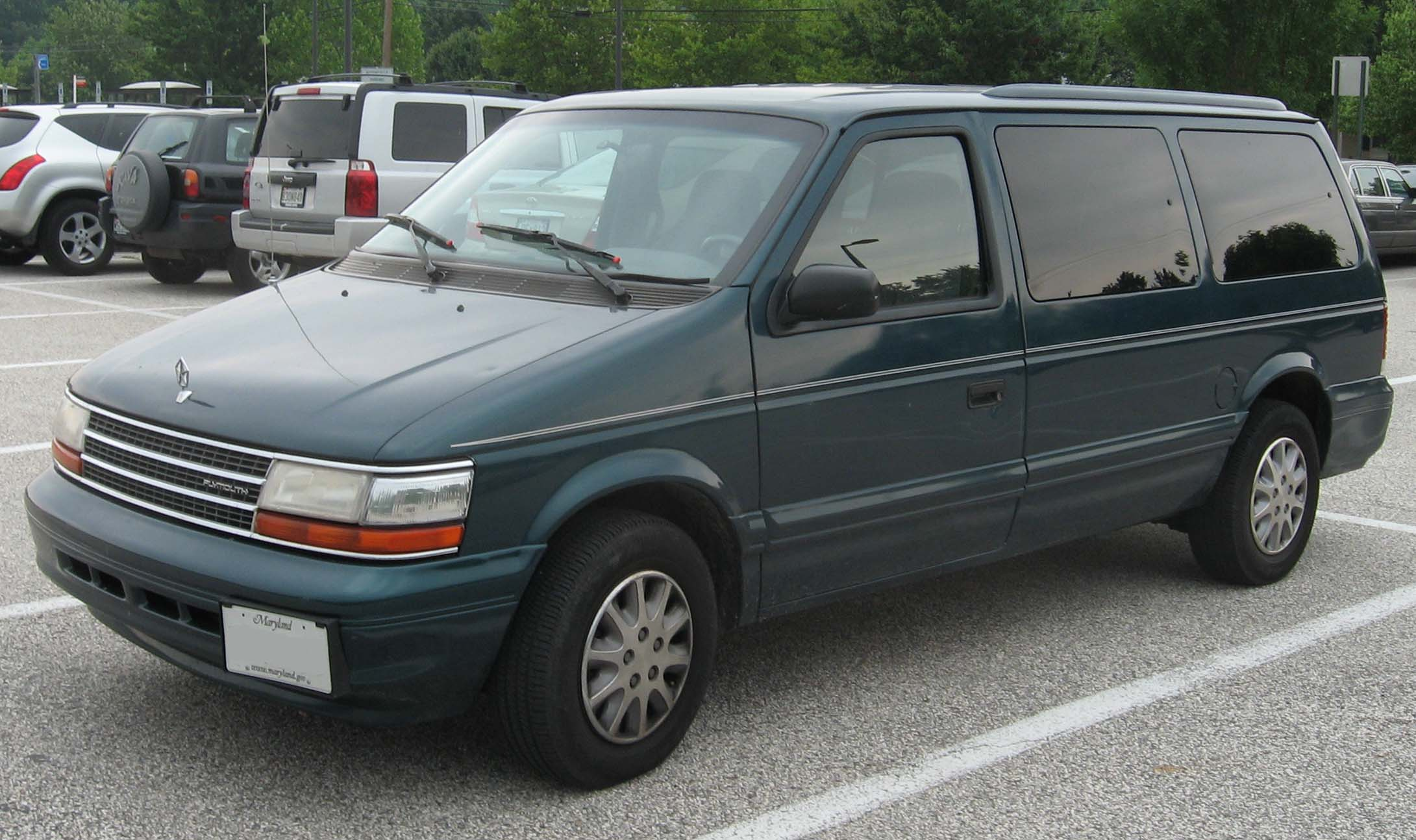
- 1994–1995 Plymouth Grand Voyager SE

Overview
- Model years: 1991–1995

Body and chassis
- Class: Minivan
- Body style: 4-door van
- Platform: Chrysler AS platform

The second-generation Chrysler minivans were released for the 1991 model year, returning the Dodge Caravan and Plymouth Voyager, their extended-wheelbase "Grand" versions, and the Chrysler Town & Country. The minivans were introduced to Mexico, with Chrysler using the Chrysler Grand Voyager/Grand Caravan nameplate.

Designated the Chrysler AS platform (as Chrysler switched to a two-letter platform nomenclature), the second-generation minivans underwent a substantial revision of the body (sharing only the front door and sliding door stampings) and chassis (the front suspension was retuned and the rear suspension was redesigned entirely); powertrain commonality shifted from the K-car sedans towards its larger derivatives. In a first for the segment, the model line was fitted with a standard driver-side airbag (1991) and optional integrated rear child safety seats (1992). Following its introduction in its Ford and GM competitors, Chrysler introduced an all-wheel drive system as an option for 1991.

For 1994, the model line underwent a mid-cycle revision. While the model line was officially classified a light truck by the US government, the minivans were upgraded to meet 1998 federal safety standards for cars, adding side-impact door beams, dual airbags, four-wheel disc brakes, and a redesigned dashboard. The second-generation minivans are the last versions of the model line to be fitted with a manual transmission in North America and also the final versions fitted with exterior woodgrain trim.

From 1993 to 1995, the Chrysler TEVan was a limited-production electric vehicle based on the Dodge Caravan; sold to fleet buyers, between 56 and 80 were produced. For 1994, Chrysler offered a CNG (compressed natural gas) version of its minivan; the fuel tank replaced the spare tire well.

=== ES platform ===
The ES platform is the European counterpart to the North American AS platform. Alongside production by Windsor Assembly in Canada, production of export-market minivans began in 1992 in Graz, Austria (at the Eurostar joint venture factory between Chrysler and Steyr-Daimler-Puch). Alongside the European-market Chrysler Voyager and Grand Voyager, the ES platform serves as the basis for the Dodge Mini Ram Van (a cargo van exclusive to the Netherlands).

== Third generation (1996–2000) ==
Third generation (NS)
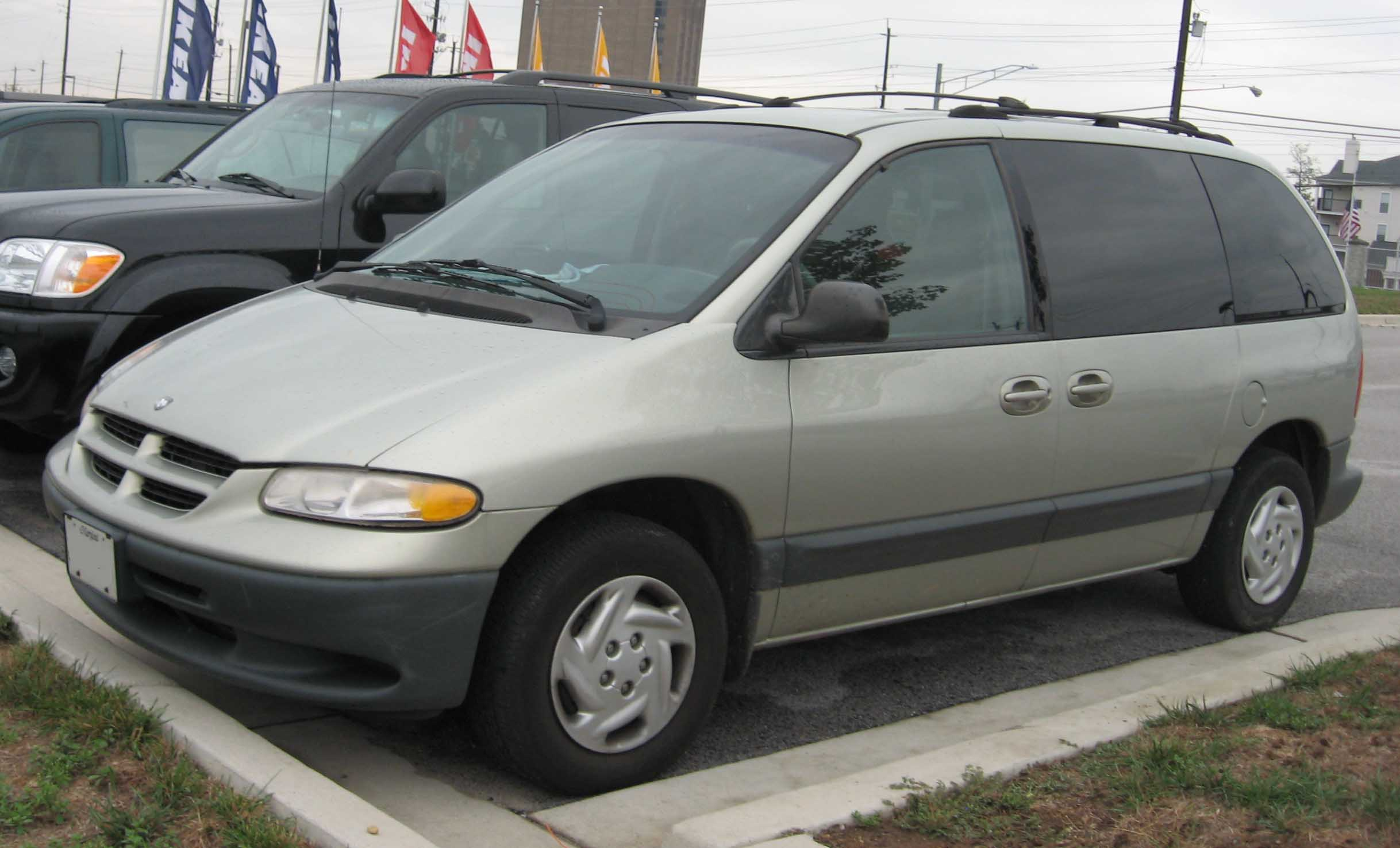
- Dodge Caravan

Overview
- Model years: 1996–2000

Body and chassis
- Class: Minivan
- Body style: 4-door van 5-door van
- Platform: Chrysler NS platform

The third-generation Chrysler minivans were released in January 1995 for the 1996 model year. In a $2.8 billion redesign of the model line (the most expensive design program ever undertaken by Chrysler at the time), the Dodge Caravan, Plymouth Voyager, and Chrysler Town & Country underwent their first complete redesign since their introduction. The Dodge Caravan (Chrysler Caravan in Mexico) and Plymouth Voyager were both returned in both standard and extended-wheelbase versions; the Chrysler Town & Country was expanded into a full model line, introducing multiple trim levels and a short-wheelbase body.

Designated the Chrysler NS platform, the minivans again used a front-wheel drive chassis (with all-wheel drive as an option). Nearly four inches taller than its predecessor, the third generation adopted a cab forward configuration, shifting the windshield and dashboard forward. As a first in an American-market large minivan, a driver-side sliding door (originally intended for the first-generation model line, but deleted to reduce costs) was introduced as an option. To improve the flexibility of seat removal, the rear seat latches were redesigned, with bench seat latches set on rollers. To further differentiate each model line, designers styled the Caravan, Voyager, and Town & Country with distinct front fascias and exterior trim; exterior woodgrain trim was retired from all three model lines. In another change, the hood ornament was deleted (the only Chrysler Pentastar visible to the driver was on the steering wheel).

Replacing the TEVan, the Dodge Caravan EPIC electric vehicle was produced from 1999 to 2000 (taking its name from a 1992 concept car); the EPIC was leased to fleet buyers.

Coinciding with the phaseout of the Plymouth brand, Chrysler introduced a Chrysler-brand Voyager and Grand Voyager for North America for 2000 (sold concurrently alongside its Plymouth namesake).

=== GS platform ===
The Chrysler GS platform is the global export counterpart to the North American Chrysler NS platform. Again sharing design and powertrain commonality with its North American counterpart, the export version of the Chrysler model line was the only version to offer a manual transmission and a 2.5L turbodiesel engine. In 1996, the Austrian Eurostar factory commenced production of the first right-hand drive Chrysler minivans.

Alongside the Chrysler Voyager and Grand Voyager marketed for European export, Chrysler marketed the renamed Dodge Ram Van in the Netherlands in a cargo-only configuration.

== Fourth generation (2001–2007) ==
Fourth generation (RS)
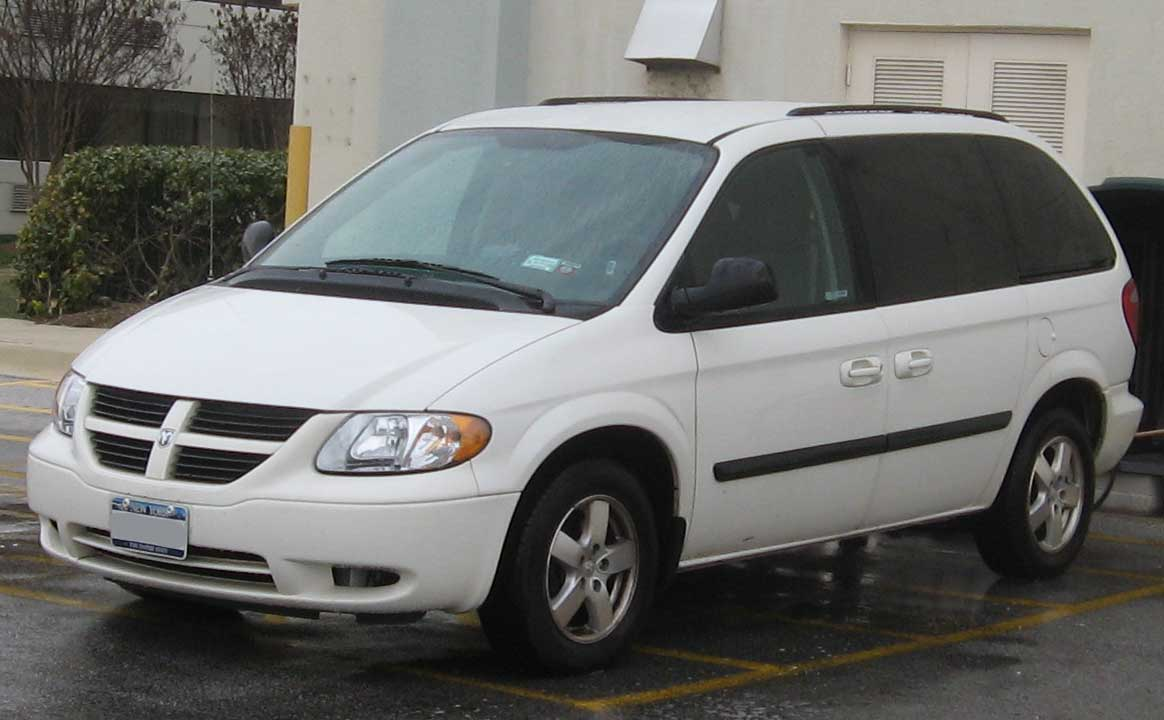
- 2007 Dodge Caravan SXT

Overview
- Model years: 2001–2007

Body and chassis
- Class: Minivan
- Body style: 4-door van 5-door van 4-door crossover SUV
- Platform: Chrysler RS platform
- Related: Chrysler Pacifica

Generation IV of the platform was introduced on January 10, 2000, and was called RS.

Models:

- 2001–2003 Chrysler Voyager
- 2001–2007 Chrysler Town & Country
- 2001–2007 Dodge Caravan/Grand Caravan
- 2001–2007 Chrysler Voyager/Grand Voyager (Mexico)

=== CS ===
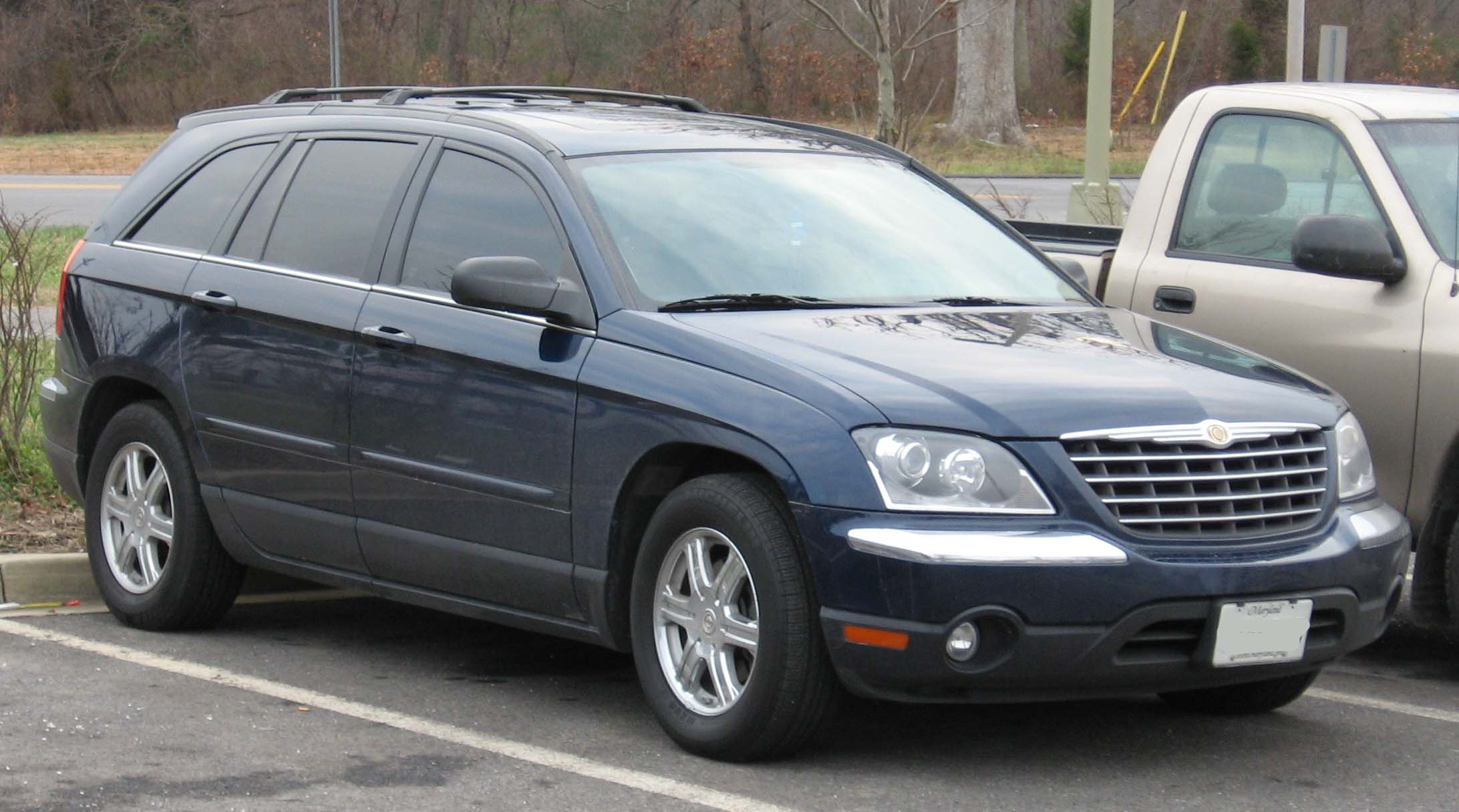
2004–2006 Chrysler Pacifica based on the Chrysler CS platform

The CS is a variant of the RS platform made specifically for the Chrysler Pacifica crossover SUV.

Model:

- 2004–2008 Chrysler Pacifica

=== RG ===
The Chrysler RG platform is the global export counterpart to the North American Chrysler RS platform.

Model:

- 2001–2007 Chrysler Caravan/Grand Caravan
- 2001–2007 Chrysler Voyager/Grand Voyager
- 2005–2007 Chrysler Town & Country (Taiwan)
- 2001–2007 Dodge/Chrysler Ram Van (Netherlands, cargo van)
- 2007–2010 Chrysler Grand Voyager/Dodge Grand Caravan (China)

== Fifth generation (2008–2020) ==
Fifth generation (RT)
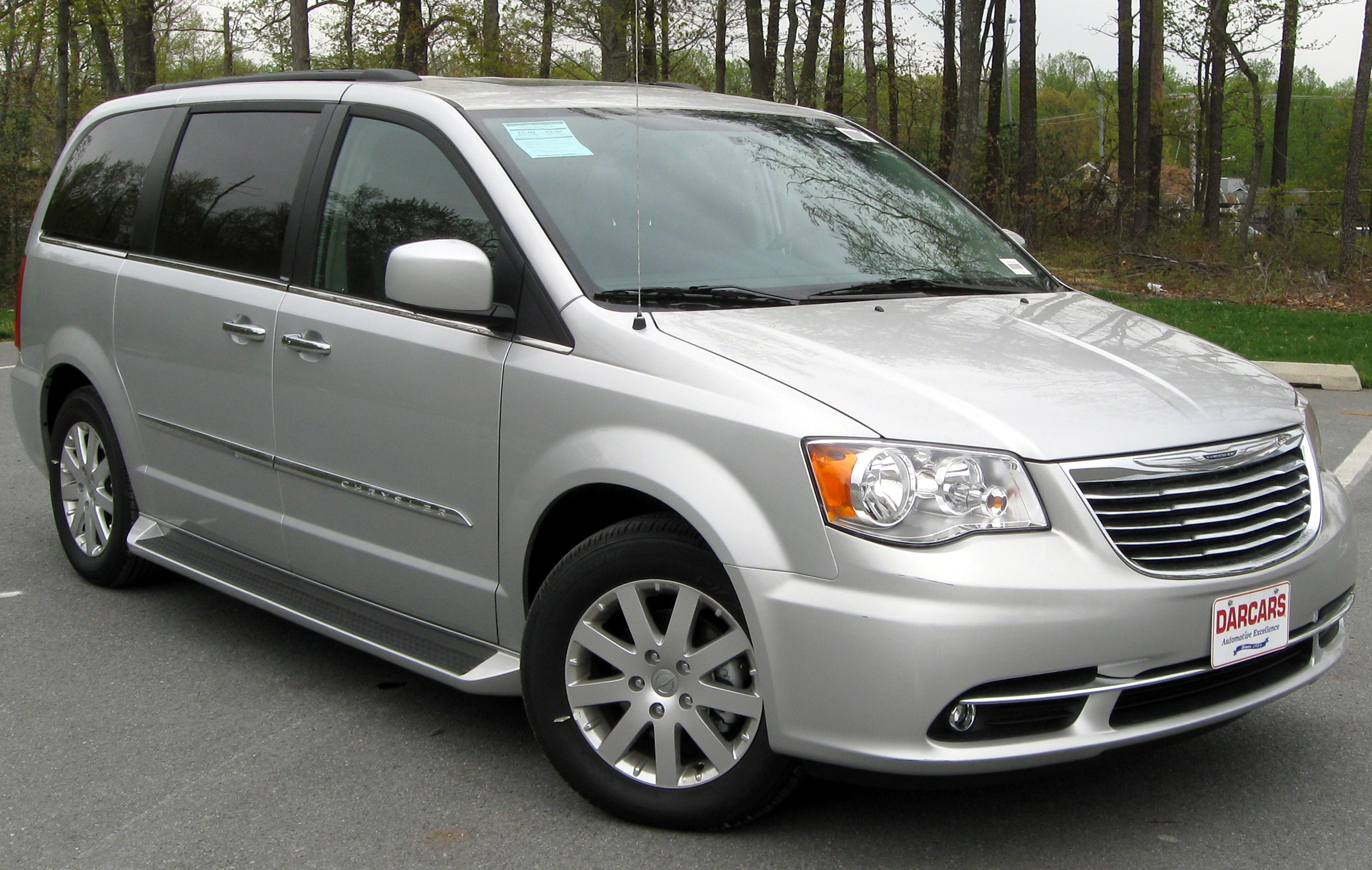
- 2011 Chrysler Town & Country Touring

Overview
- Model years: 2008–2020

Body and chassis
- Class: Minivan; Cargo van
- Body style: 5-door van
- Platform: Chrysler RT platform

The fifth-generation Chrysler minivans were introduced at the 2007 North American International Auto Show for the 2008 model year, marking the debut of the RT platform. In a major design change, the platform adopted a single wheelbase for all models, with Chrysler retiring its original short-wheelbase configuration. For the first time (in North America), the Chrysler minivans were powered exclusively by V6 engines; a 4.0L SOHC V6 was introduced as the highest-option engine for 2008. For 2011, a 3.6L DOHC Pentastar V6 was introduced; replacing all three previous V6 engines, the Pentastar V6 remains the sole V6 engine through current production. In Europe, the standard engine was a 2.8L VM Motori inline-4 turbodiesel (for the first time, no manual transmission was offered).

Alongside the previous Chrysler Town & Country and Dodge Grand Caravan, the RT brought several branding changes. Initially sold as the Chrysler Grand Voyager in Continental Europe, the acquisition of Chrysler by Fiat led to its replacement by the Lancia Voyager during 2011; after the 2015 model year, Chrysler ended export sales of its minivans. For 2012 to 2014, the Ram C/V Tradesman was marketed as a cargo van variant of the Dodge Grand Caravan (replaced by the Ram ProMaster City).

Models:

- 2008–2016 Chrysler Town & Country
- 2008–2020 Dodge Grand Caravan
- 2008–2010 Chrysler Grand Voyager
- 2011–2015 Lancia Voyager
- 2012–2014 Ram C/V (replaced by Ram ProMaster City)

=== RM ===
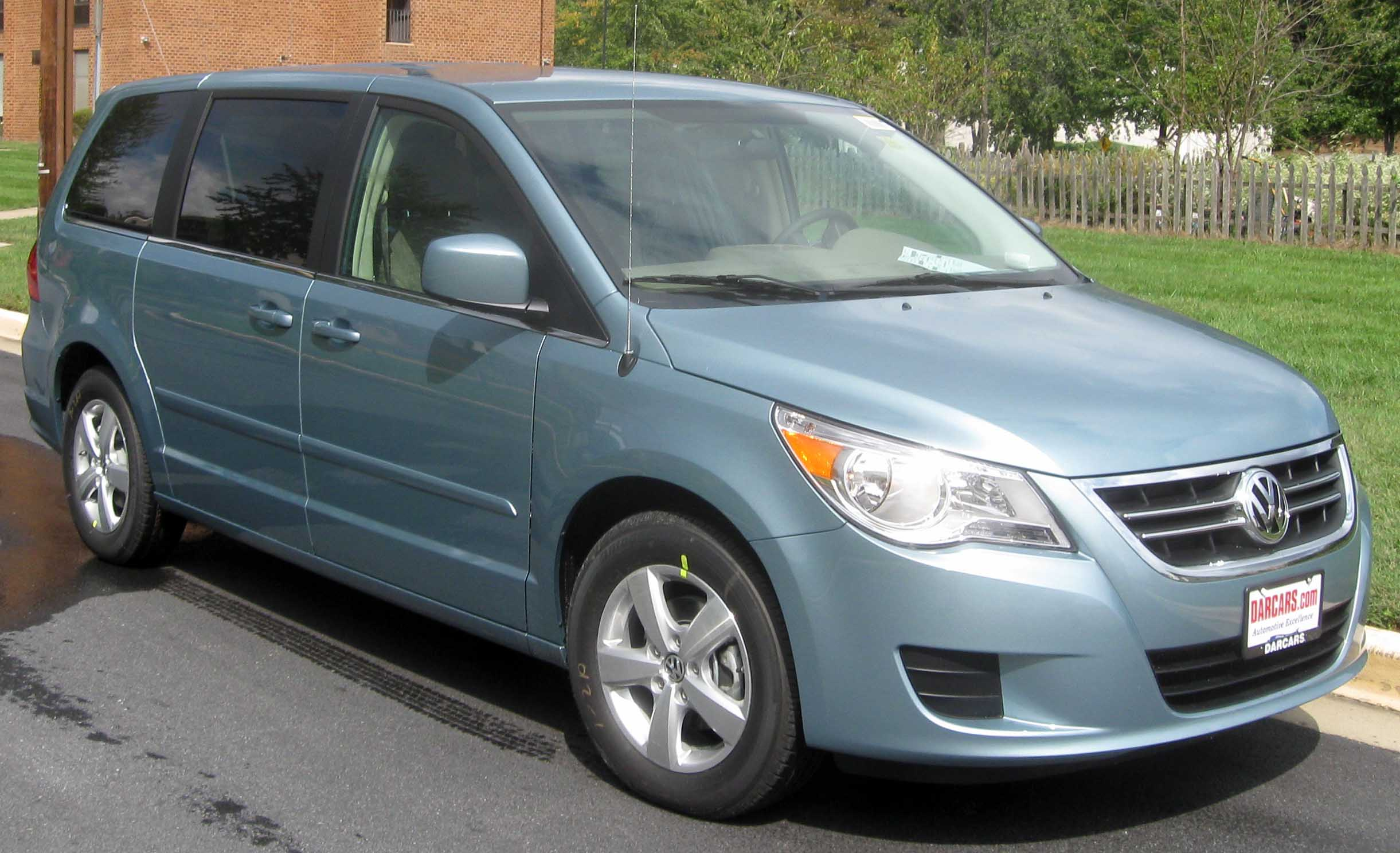
RM Platform, 2009 Volkswagen Routan SE

The Volkswagen Routan was introduced at the 2008 Chicago Auto Show as a rebadged variant of the Chrysler minivans, manufactured at Windsor Assembly using the RT platform, designated as the RM platform. Marketed by Volkswagen exclusively in the North American market, the Routan featured revised interior and exterior styling as well as different equipment content from the Chrysler vans. Production of the Routan was discontinued in 2013.

Model:

- 2009–2014 Volkswagen Routan

=== Discontinuation ===
On February 28, 2020, Fiat Chrysler Automobiles announced the discontinuation of the Dodge Grand Caravan, the last RT nameplate in production. On August 21, 2020, the final Dodge Grand Caravan was produced by Windsor Assembly.

== Sixth generation (2017–present) ==
Sixth generation (RU)
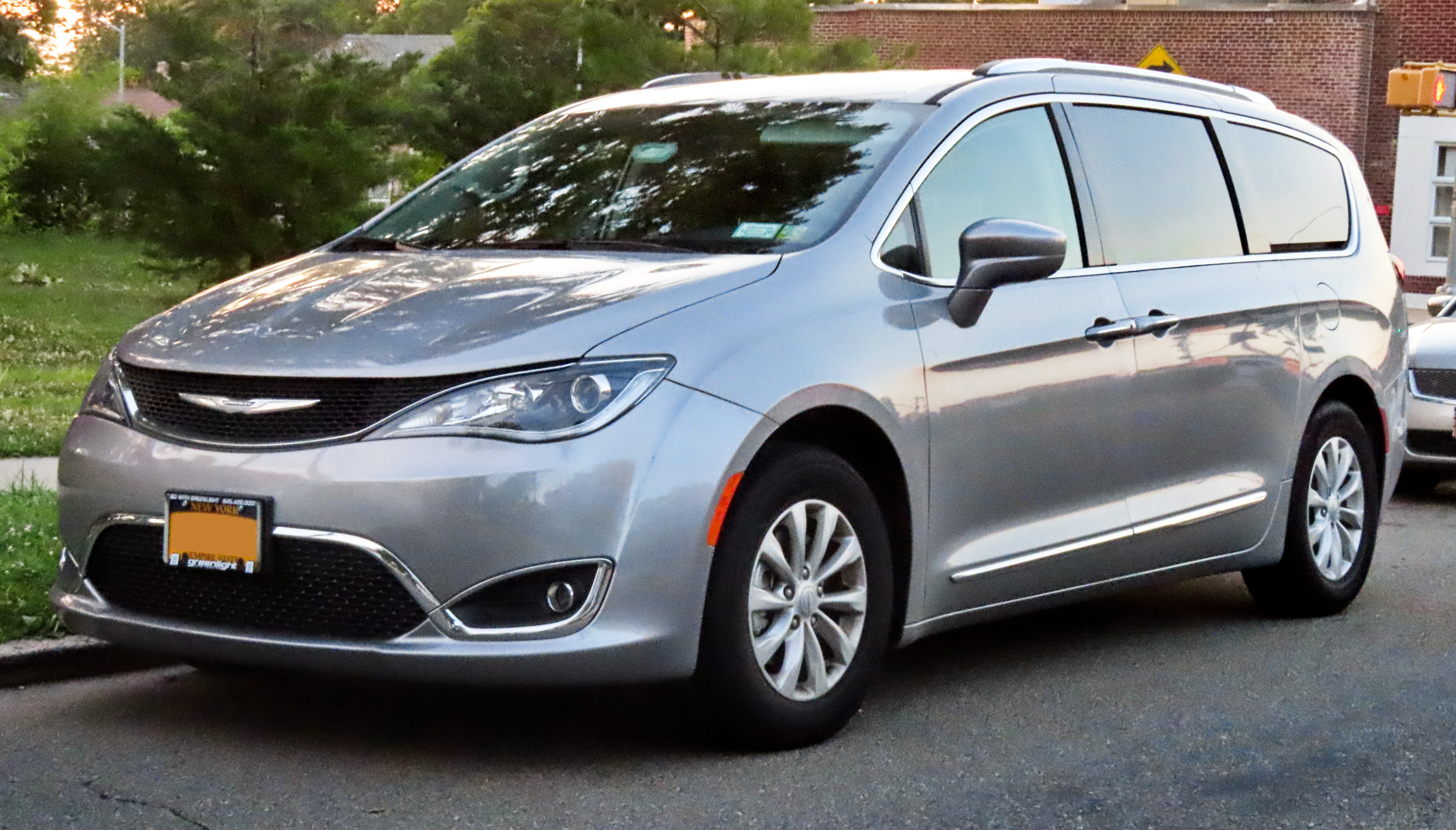
- 2019 Chrysler Pacifica Touring L

Overview
- Model years: 2017–present

Body and chassis
- Class: Minivan
- Body style: 5-door van
- Platform: Chrysler RU platform (Fiat D-Evo platform)

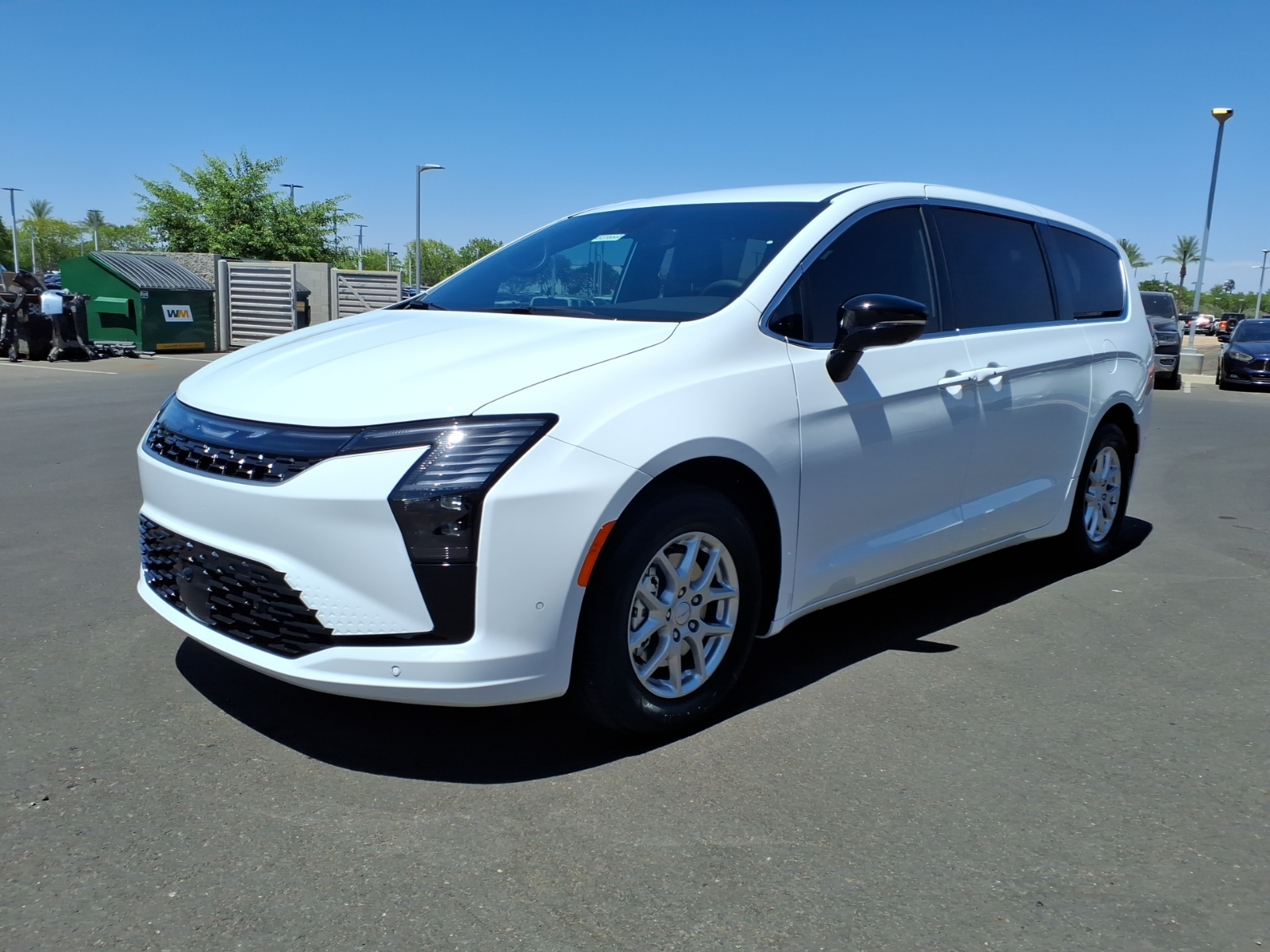
2027 Chrysler Pacifica Select

The sixth generation of the Chrysler minivan was introduced for 2017, debuting at the 2016 North American International Auto Show. Designated the RU platform, the new design shared the CUSW (Fiat D-Evo) platform with the Chrysler 200. Along with the first 9-speed automatic transmission offered in a minivan, the new design offered the first plug-in hybrid powertrain for the segment (as an option, along with the first CVT in a Chrysler minivan).

Chrysler underwent a series of branding changes for the new generation, as the revived Pacifica nameplate replaced the Town & Country. The new design was sold only by Chrysler, as Dodge continued to market the fifth-generation Grand Caravan through 2020. For the first time since 1987, Chrysler did not market its minivans outside of North America. As a result, Chrysler withdrew its minivan lines from Europe, Oceania, Asia, and Africa (leading to the discontinuation of the Chrysler Grand Voyager in Eastern Europe, The Middle East, China, South Korea, Singapore, Australia, New Zealand, South Africa, United Kingdom, Ireland, Malta, and Cyprus and the discontinuation of the Lancia Voyager in Continental Europe) and from Latin America and The Philippines (as it discontinued the Chrysler Town & Country). Initially sold as the Chrysler Pacifica in the United States and Canada, entry-level trims were later reintroduced as the Chrysler Voyager (United States) and the Chrysler Grand Caravan (Canada).

For 2020, Chrysler reintroduced the Chrysler Voyager nameplate in the United States (last seen in 2003), replacing the two lowest trims of the Pacifica and introducing a version specifically for fleet sale. An AWD system returned late in the model year as an option.

For 2021, the Pacifica was given its first facelift, adopting a grille similar to the Chrysler 300 along with a full-width taillamp. The entry-level Voyager (which retained the pre-facelift bodywork) was joined by a sixth-generation Grand Caravan. Following the retirement of the Dodge model line, the model nameplate was moved to Chrysler, where it was sold as the Canadian-market equivalent of the Voyager.

At the end of the 2023 model year, Chrysler retired its 300 model line, leaving the Pacifica/Voyager/Grand Caravan as the only vehicle currently marketed by Chrysler worldwide. In January 2026, the Pacifica Plug-in Hybrid was discontinued (with a shortened 2026 model year being the final model year for the Pacifica plug-in hybrid), due to poor sales and the loss of federal EV Tax Credits, particularly in the United States for the latter reason.

In 2026, Chrysler released the second facelift for the Pacifica as an early 2027 model, bringing its fascia design in line with the upcoming Chrysler Airflow with standard LED headlamps and a redesigned Chrysler wing emblem. While no replacement for the Pacifica Plug-in Hybrid has been announced, the rest of the powertrain is carryover, including the 3.6L V6, 9-speed automatic, and optional all-wheel drive. The entry-level US-market Chrysler Voyager also got renamed back to the Chrysler Pacifica LX (while still continuing to retain the 2017 pre-facelift Pacifica exterior styling) for the 2027 model year; Chrysler Canada continues to market its equivalent vehicle as the Chrysler Grand Caravan (marking the 40th anniversary of the "Grand" Chrysler minivans).

Models:

- Chrysler Pacifica (2017-present)
- Chrysler Pacifica Hybrid (2017-early 2026)
- Chrysler Voyager (2020-2026; fleet only for 2022-2024; United States only)
- Chrysler Grand Caravan (2020-present; Canada only)

== See also ==
- Chrysler platforms
- Minivan
