= Eurostar Automobilwerk =

Austrian automotive company

- Company type: GesmbH & Co. KG
- Industry: Automotive
- Founded: 13 February 1990
- Defunct: 6 July 2002
- Fate: Acquired
- Headquarters: Graz-Liebenau, Austria
- Key people: Gary W. Cash (CEO)
- Products: Automobiles
- Revenue: 10.8 billion öS (1998)
- Number of employees: 1,900 (2001)
- Parent: DaimlerChrysler
- Website: www.eurostar.at

The Eurostar Automobilwerk GesmbH & Co. KG is a former subsidiary of the automotive corporation DaimlerChrysler. It was established in 1990, and it mainly produced Chrysler automobiles at the factory located in Graz-Liebenau, Austria. In 2002, it was incorporated into Magna Steyr Fahrzeugtechnik AG & Co. KG. The factory area covered 221,180 square metres.

== Plant history ==
The company was founded on 13 February 1990 as a 50/50 joint venture between the Chrysler Corporation and the Steyr-Daimler-Puch Fahrzeugtechnik AG & Co. KG. The construction of the new plant began in March. It was built by the construction company consortium of Ed. Ast & Co. Baugesellschaft mbH and Universale Bau AG. After 19 months the construction work was completed and the installation of the assembly line began. The series production of Chrysler Voyager and the Chrysler Grand Voyager was initiated at the opening ceremony of Lee Iacocca on 29 April 1992. After a successful launch, a second shift began to work. In March 1995, the 100,000th Chrysler Voyager rolled off the assembly line. In November, a new generation was introduced. New robots and more automation improved the processing quality of the vehicles. The following year, the company began with the mass production of right-hand drive vehicles. The maximum annual production capacity of the plant was at 55,000 vehicles. In 1998, DaimlerChrysler decided to buy the plant and incorporates it into the group as one of its subsidiaries.

In late 1999, the construction of a plant expansion started. The expansion lasted over a year and covered a new area of 7,000 m^{2}. The extension was necessary to enable the planned assembly of diesel motorized units of the new Chrysler PT Cruiser. Approximately 600 new jobs were created. The company has invested a sum of €58 million for the expansion. At the same time a modification of the assembly line for the Voyagers was done. The assembly of the fourth generation Voyager started in January 2001, and that of the Chrysler PT Cruiser and Chrysler PT Cruiser Cabrio in July.

But the Austrian assembly of the PT Cruisers was too expensive, so the DaimlerChrysler concern decided in December to end this as quickly as possible. Per vehicle, the Austrian assembly was US $2000 more expensive than would have been the case in Toluca, Mexico. After that there were the first discussions to sell the plant. So the assembly of the PT Cruisers ended after a year and the completion of 50,000 units.

On 29 February 2002, the company was purchased by Magna International Inc. at an Annual General Meeting of Chrysler in Auburn Hills, Michigan. After the assembly of the last PT Cruiser, the company was dissolved by its new owner. Since that time, the former Eurostar plant has been a part of the Magna Steyr Fahrzeugtechnik AG & Co. KG.

== Models produced ==
- Chrysler Voyager GH (Apr 1992 – Sep 1995)
- Chrysler Grand Voyager ES (Apr 1992 – Sep 1995)
- Chrysler Caravan GS (Nov 1995 – Dec 2000)
- Chrysler Grand Caravan GH (Nov 1995 – Dec 2000)
- Chrysler Voyager GS (Nov 1995 – Dec 2000)
- Chrysler Grand Voyager GH (Nov 1995 – Dec 2000)
- Chrysler Caravan RG (Jan 2001 – Jul 2002)
- Chrysler Grand Caravan GK & GY (Jan 2001 – Jul 2002)
- Chrysler Voyager RG (Jan 2001 – Jul 2002)
- Chrysler Grand Voyager GK & GY (Jan 2001 – Jul 2002)
- Chrysler PT Cruiser FY & FZ (Jul 2001 – Jul 2002)
- Chrysler PT Cruiser Cabrio JY & JZ (Jul 2001 – Jul 2002)
