= Chrysler Voyager =

American minivan model

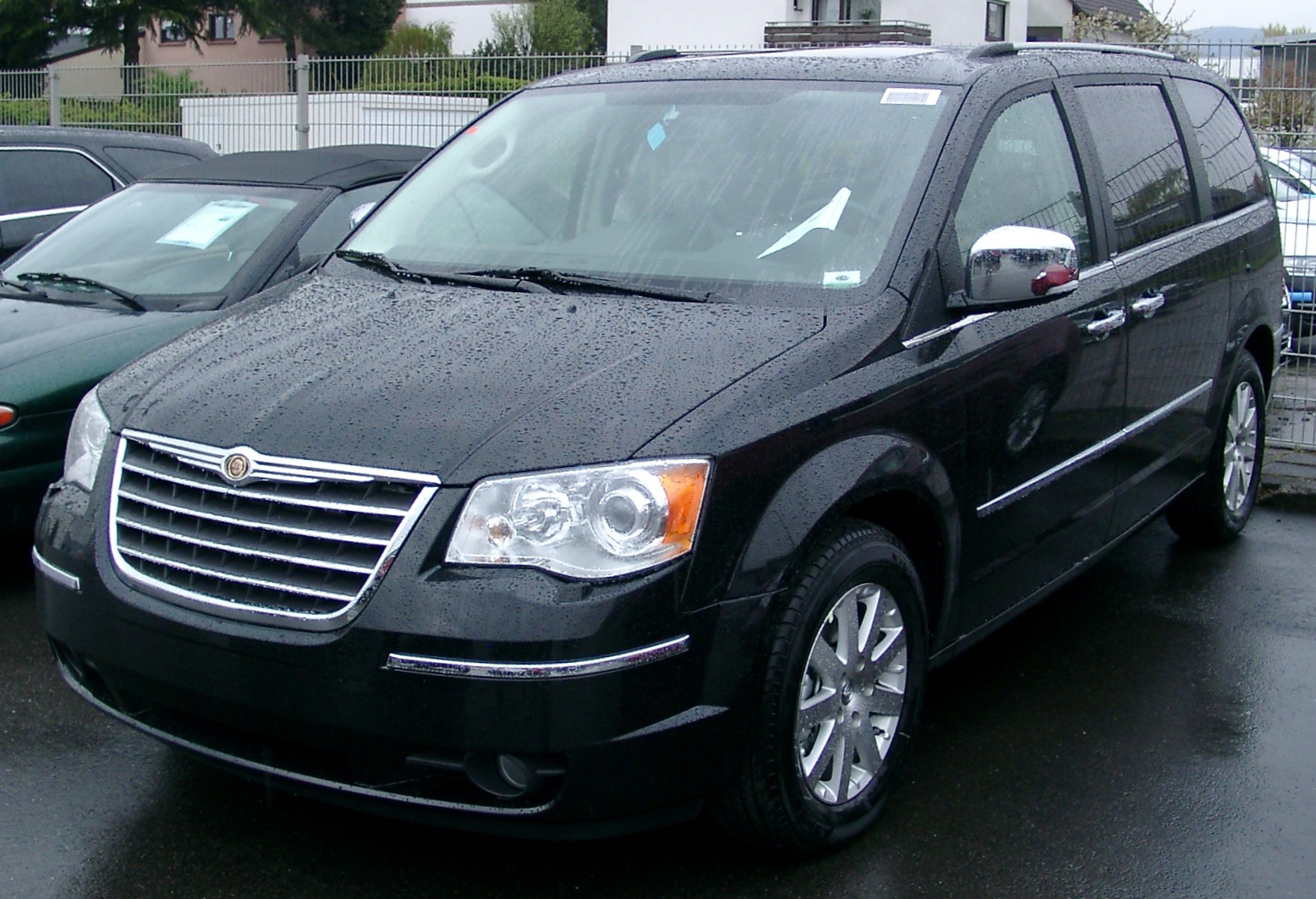

Overview
- Manufacturer: Chrysler (Note: Chrysler Corporation (1988–1998); DaimlerChrysler (1998–2007); Chrysler LLC (2007–2009); Chrysler Group LLC (2009–2014); FCA US LLC (2014–2021); Stellantis North America (2021–present))
- Also called: Lancia Voyager (2011–2016); Chrysler Grand Caravan (2020–present)
- Production: 1988–2016; 2019–2026

Body and chassis
- Class: Minivan
- Body style: 3 to 4-door minivan
- Related: Dodge Caravan; Chrysler Town & Country; Chrysler Pacifica; Volkswagen Routan

Chronology
- Predecessor: Plymouth Voyager; Lancia Phedra (Europe); Dodge Grand Caravan (US and Canada)

The Chrysler Voyager (and the long-wheelbase Chrysler Grand Voyager) is a minivan produced by the Chrysler division of Stellantis. In the current lineup, it is positioned as the lower-end Chrysler minivan, having replaced the Dodge Grand Caravan in 2020, below the Chrysler Pacifica.

The Chrysler Voyager was introduced in Europe in 1988, and was a rebadged version of the Dodge Caravan in the United States. It originally evolved with the Caravan, the Plymouth Voyager, and the Chrysler Town & Country. In the United States, the Chrysler Voyager nameplate replaced the short-wheelbase (SWB) version of the Plymouth Voyager following the folding of the Plymouth division by DaimlerChrysler AG in 2001, and was discontinued in 2003. The nameplate was revived for the 2021 model year following the discontinuation of the Dodge Grand Caravan after the 2020 model year, and is rebadged as the Chrysler Grand Caravan in Canada.

In Continental Europe, the Chrysler Voyager was rebadged as the Lancia Voyager from the 2011 until 2016 model years. The Voyager was sold with different engines, including diesel engines, and was also available with manual transmission and a foot-operated emergency brake. Although now produced solely in Ontario, Canada, the Grand Voyagers were still available with diesel engines as standard. These diesel engines are based on a modern double overhead cam common rail design from VM Motori of Italy. The last European Chrysler Grand Voyagers are very similar to the 2008 and later Chrysler Town & Country vans, and were sold only in the long-wheelbase version (as in North America). Following the fifth generation, the Grand Voyager nameplate was discontinued in all markets.

Together with its nameplate variants, the Chrysler minivans have ranked as the 13th bestselling automotive nameplate worldwide, with over 12 million sold.

== First generation (1988–1990) ==
First generation
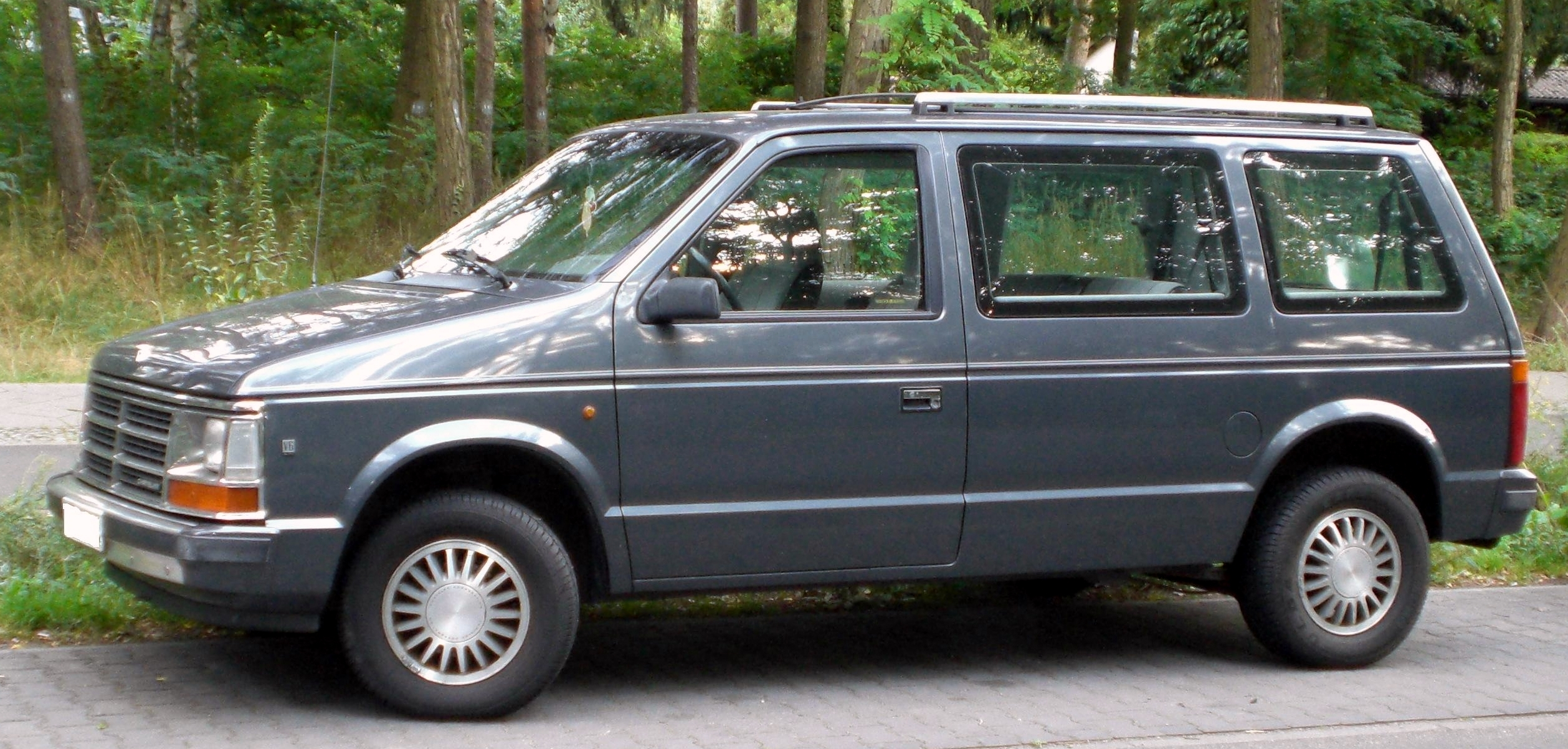

Overview
- Also called: Chrysler Grand Voyager (LWB Model); Chrysler Voyager (SWB Model)
- Production: 1988–1990
- Assembly: United States: Fenton, Missouri (Saint Louis Assembly North)

Body and chassis
- Body style: 3-door minivan
- Layout: Transverse front-engine, front-wheel drive
- Platform: Chrysler S platform
- Related: Chrysler Town & Country; Plymouth Voyager; Dodge Caravan

Powertrain
- Engine: 2.2 L K I4 (1987 only); 2.5 L K I4; 3.0 L Mitsubishi 6G72 V6
- Transmission: 5-speed manual 3-speed A413 automatic 3-speed A670 automatic 4-speed A604 automatic

The Dodge Caravan was first introduced as a North American minivan for the United States and Canadian markets, sold along with the identical Plymouth Voyager, in November 1983, for the 1984 model year. Interior trim, controls, and instrumentation were borrowed from the Chrysler K platform, and coupled with the lower floor enabled by the front-wheel-drive, the Caravan featured car-like ease of entry. The line was first introduced into the European market in 1988 as Dodge Caravans rebranded as Chryslers. Europe's Chrysler Voyager was nearly identical to the American Dodge Caravan except that the turbocharged I4 engine and the 3.3 L Chrysler EGA V6 were not available.

=== Engines ===
- 2.2 L K I4
- 2.5 L K I4
- 3.0 L Mitsubishi 6G72 V6

== Second generation (1991–1995) ==
Second generation
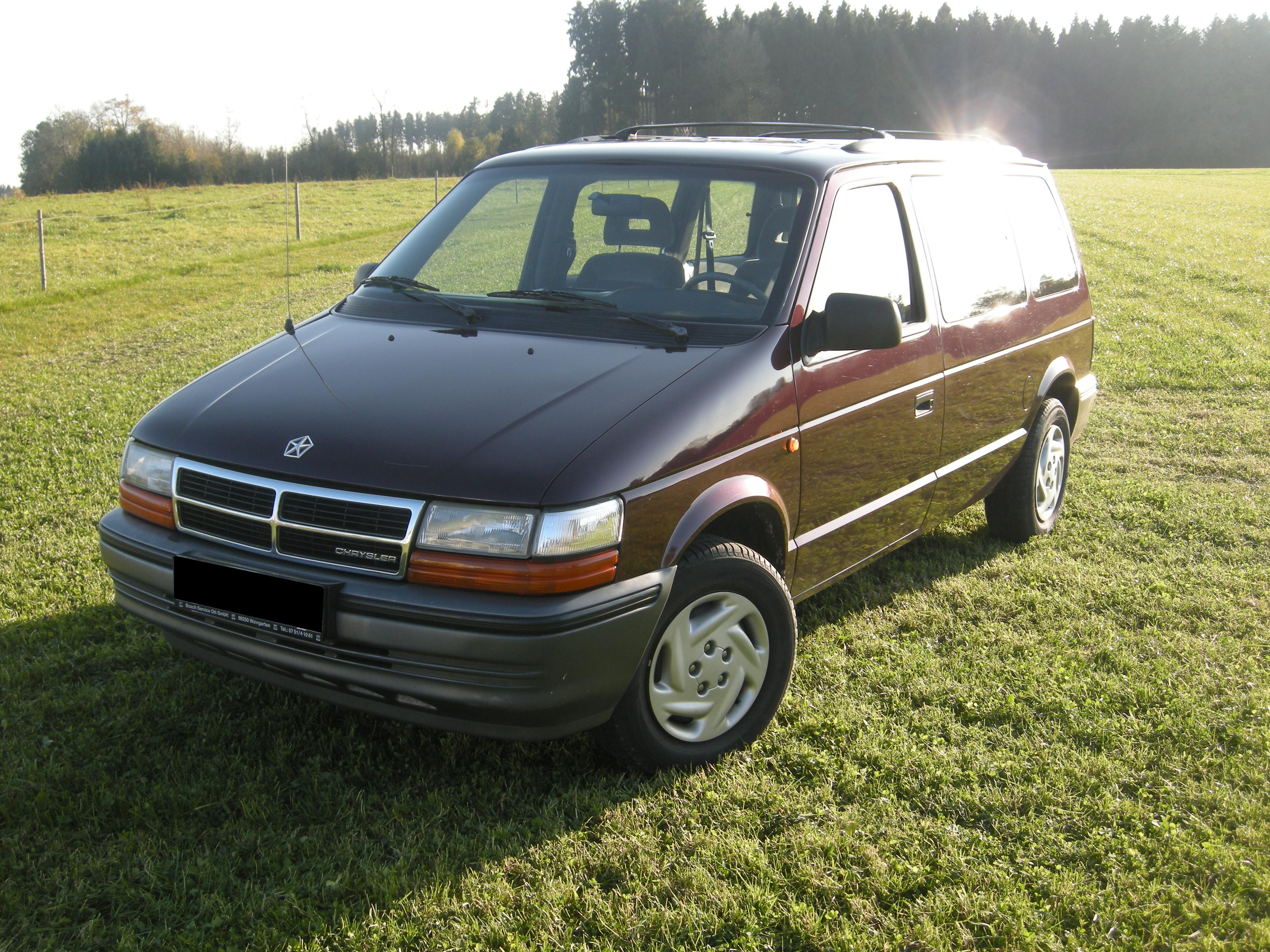

Overview
- Also called: Chrysler Grand Voyager (LWB Model); Chrysler Voyager (SWB Model)
- Production: 1990–1995
- Assembly: United States: Fenton, Missouri (Saint Louis Assembly North); Austria: Graz (Eurostar)

Body and chassis
- Body style: 3-door minivan
- Layout: Transverse front-engine, front-wheel drive / all-wheel drive
- Platform: Chrysler AS platform
- Related: Chrysler Town & Country; Plymouth Voyager; Dodge Caravan

Powertrain
- Engine: 2.5 L K I4; 2.5 L VM Motori 425 OHV TD; 3.0 L Mitsubishi 6G72 V6; 3.3 L EGA V6
- Transmission: 5-speed A523 manual 5-speed A568 manual 3-speed A413 automatic 3-speed A670 automatic 4-speed A604 automatic

Introduced for the 1991 model year, the Chrysler Voyager in Europe continued to be identical to the Dodge Caravan in the United States except that the 3.8 L V6 was not available for the Chrysler Voyager. This would be the final generation available with a manual transmission in the United States. A 2.5 L turbo-diesel four-cylinder engine produced by VM Motori was made available beginning in 1994. There were also military modifications available for the Voyager in South Africa, which included large fuel tanks available in 240 and 360-liter capacities.

=== Engines ===
- 2.5 L K I4
- 2.5 L VM425 Turbo Diesel (1994–1995)
- 3.0 L Mitsubishi 6G72 V6
- 3.3 L EGA V6
- 3.8L

== Third generation (1996–2000) ==
Third generation
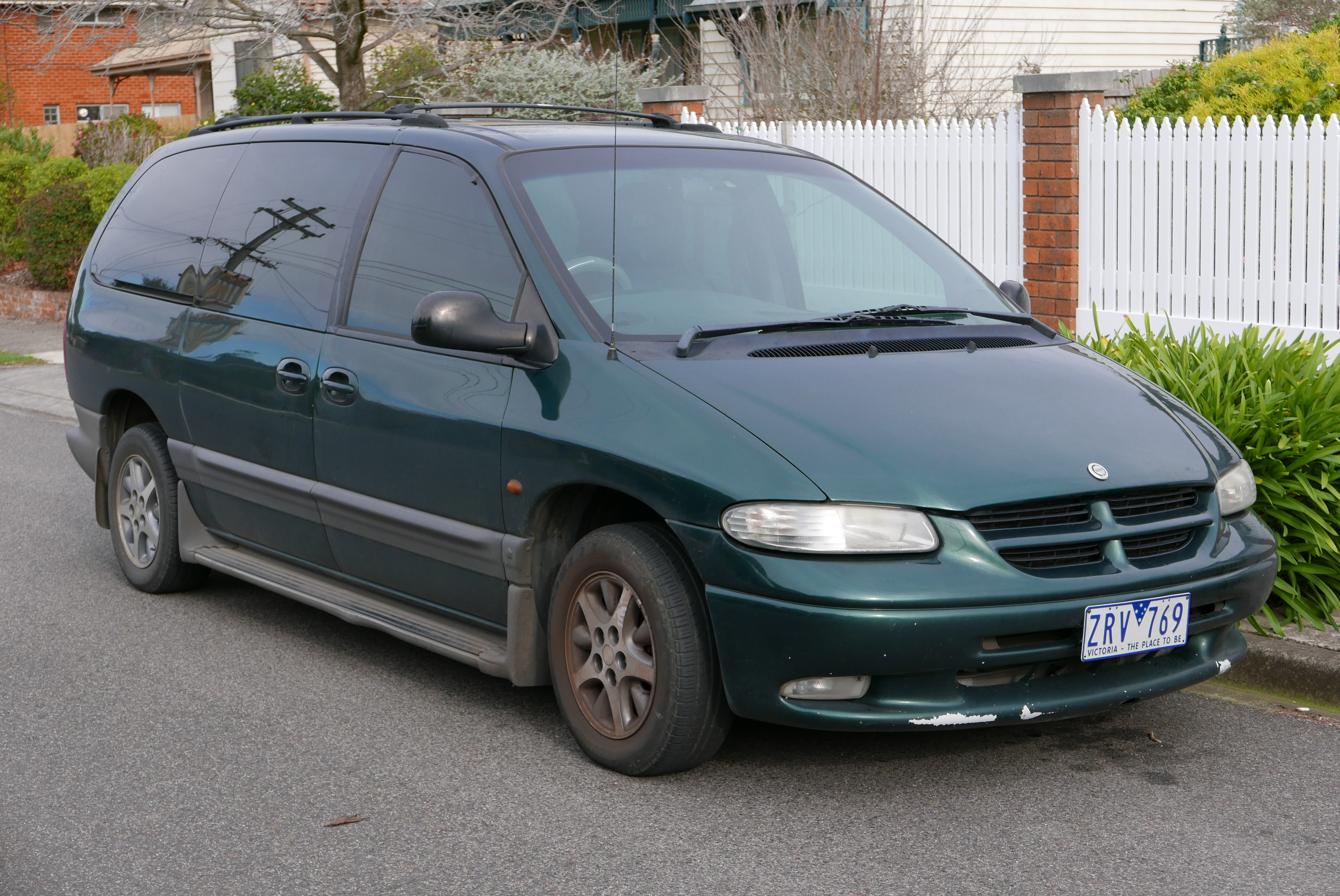

Overview
- Also called: Chrysler Caravan; Chrysler Grand Caravan (Argentina, Puerto Rico, Brazil and South Korea); Chrysler Grand Voyager (LWB model); Chrysler Voyager (SWB model)
- Production: 1995–2000
- Assembly: United States: Fenton, Missouri (Saint Louis Assembly South); Austria: Graz (Eurostar)

Body and chassis
- Body style: 3-door minivan 4-door minivan
- Layout: Front-engine, front-wheel drive / Four-wheel drive
- Platform: Chrysler GS platform Chrysler NS platform
- Related: Chrysler Town & Country; Dodge Caravan; Plymouth Voyager

Powertrain
- Engine: 2.0 L A588 SOHC (gasoline); 2.0 L ECC DOHC (gasoline); 2.4 L EDZ I4 (gasoline); 2.5 L VM Motori 425 OHV (turbo diesel); 3.0 L Mitsubishi 6G72 V6 (gasoline); 3.3 L EGA V6 (gasoline / E85); 3.8 L EGH V6 (gasoline)
- Transmission: 3-speed 31TH automatic 4-speed 41TE automatic 5-speed manual

Dimensions
- Wheelbase: 113.3 in (2,878 mm); 119.3 in (3,030 mm) (Grand Voyager)
- Length: 186.3 in (4,732 mm); 199.6 in (5,070 mm) (Grand Voyager)
- Width: 75.6 in (1,920 mm)
- Height: 68.5 in (1,740 mm); 68.4 in (1,737 mm)
- Curb weight: 3,528 lb (1,600 kg); 3,680 lb (1,669 kg) (Grand Voyager)

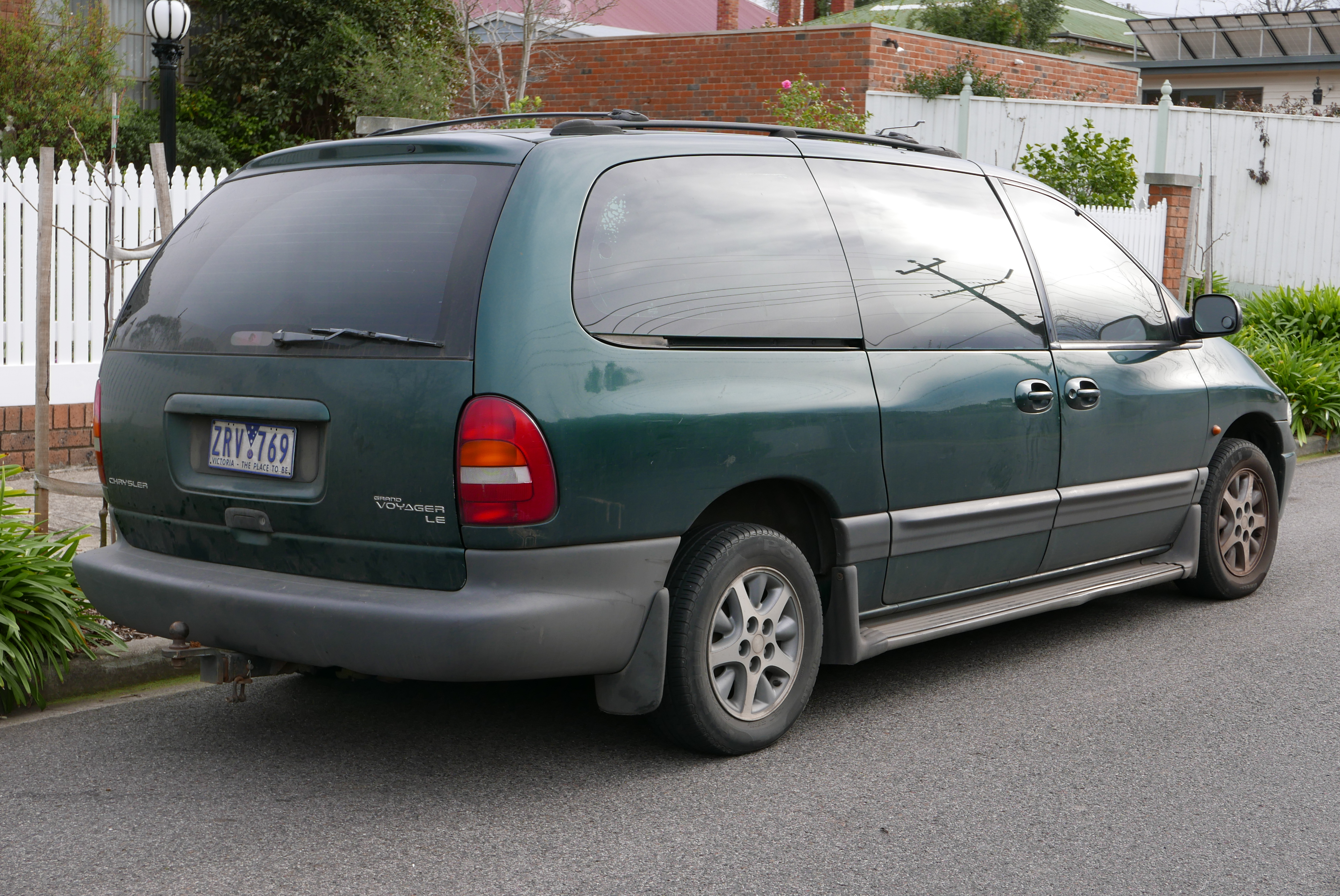
Chrysler Voyager LE (Australia)

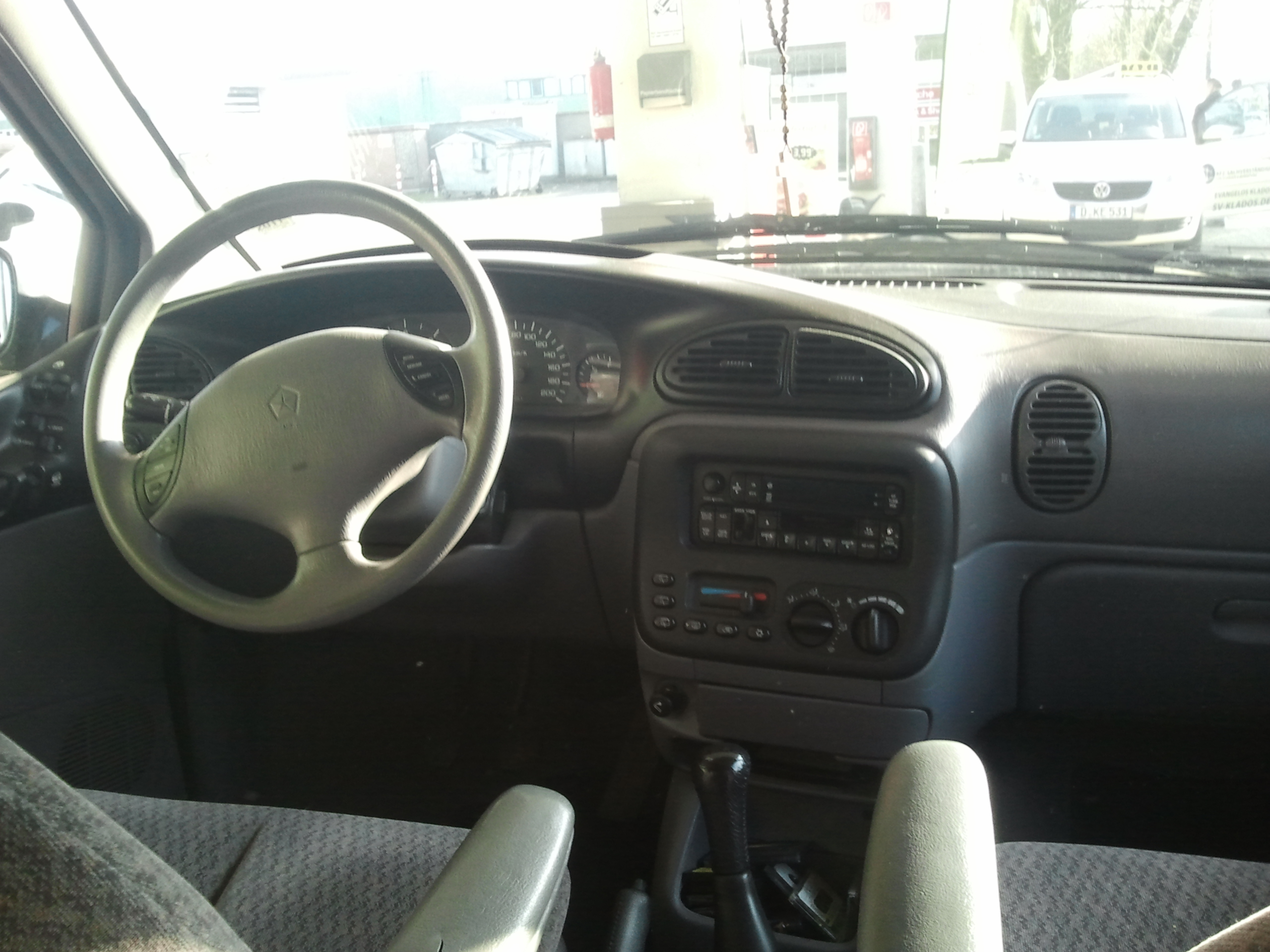
Interior

The 1996–1999 models in Mexico are rebadged Dodge Caravans, although the Caravan was sold alongside the Voyager. For 2000, the Chrysler Voyager was identical to the Plymouth Voyager except that the 3.8 L V6 was not available. Base models of the Voyager were offered in most states with either a 2.4 L four-cylinder or a 3.0 L Mitsubishi V6 engine, except in California and several northeastern states, where the Mitsubishi V6 didn't meet emissions standards. In those locales, the 3.3 L engine was offered instead.

For the European market, Voyagers continued to be rebadged Caravans. Unique to this market were 2.0 L Straight-4 SOHC and DOHC engines and 2.5 L turbo diesel produced by VM Motori. European market vans also came with manual transmissions and in a six-passenger model with six captains chairs, not available elsewhere.

=== Engines ===
- 2.0 L A588 I4 SOHC
- 2.0 L ECC I4 DOHC
- 2.4 L EDZ I4
- 2.5 L VM425 I4 Turbo Diesel
- 3.3 L EGA V6
- 3.8 L EGH V6 (AWD; not available in UK)
- 3.0 L Mitsubishi 6G72 V6

=== Safety ===
According to Euro NCAP crash test results, the 1999 model Chrysler Voyager did so badly in the frontal impact that it earned no points, making it the worst of the group. The body structure became unstable and the steering column was driven back into the driver's chest and head'. The 2007 model Chrysler Voyager fared little better, achieving just 19% in the frontal impact test, with an overall score of 2 stars out of a possible 5. However, chest compression measurements on the test dummy 'indicated an unacceptably high risk of serious or fatal injury. As a result, the final star in the adult occupant rating is struck-through'.

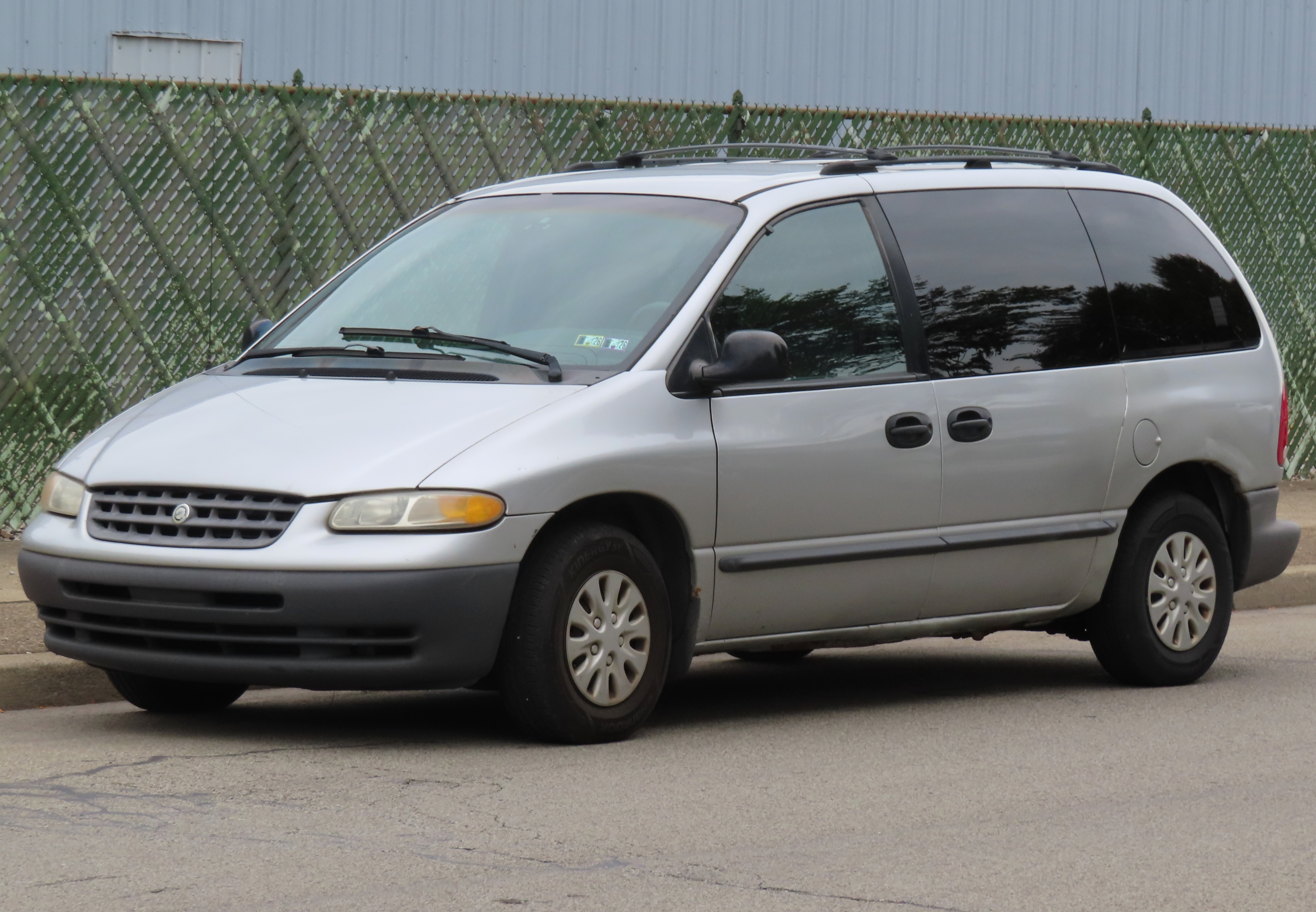
2000 Chrysler Voyager (US)

== Fourth generation (2001–2007) ==
Fourth generation
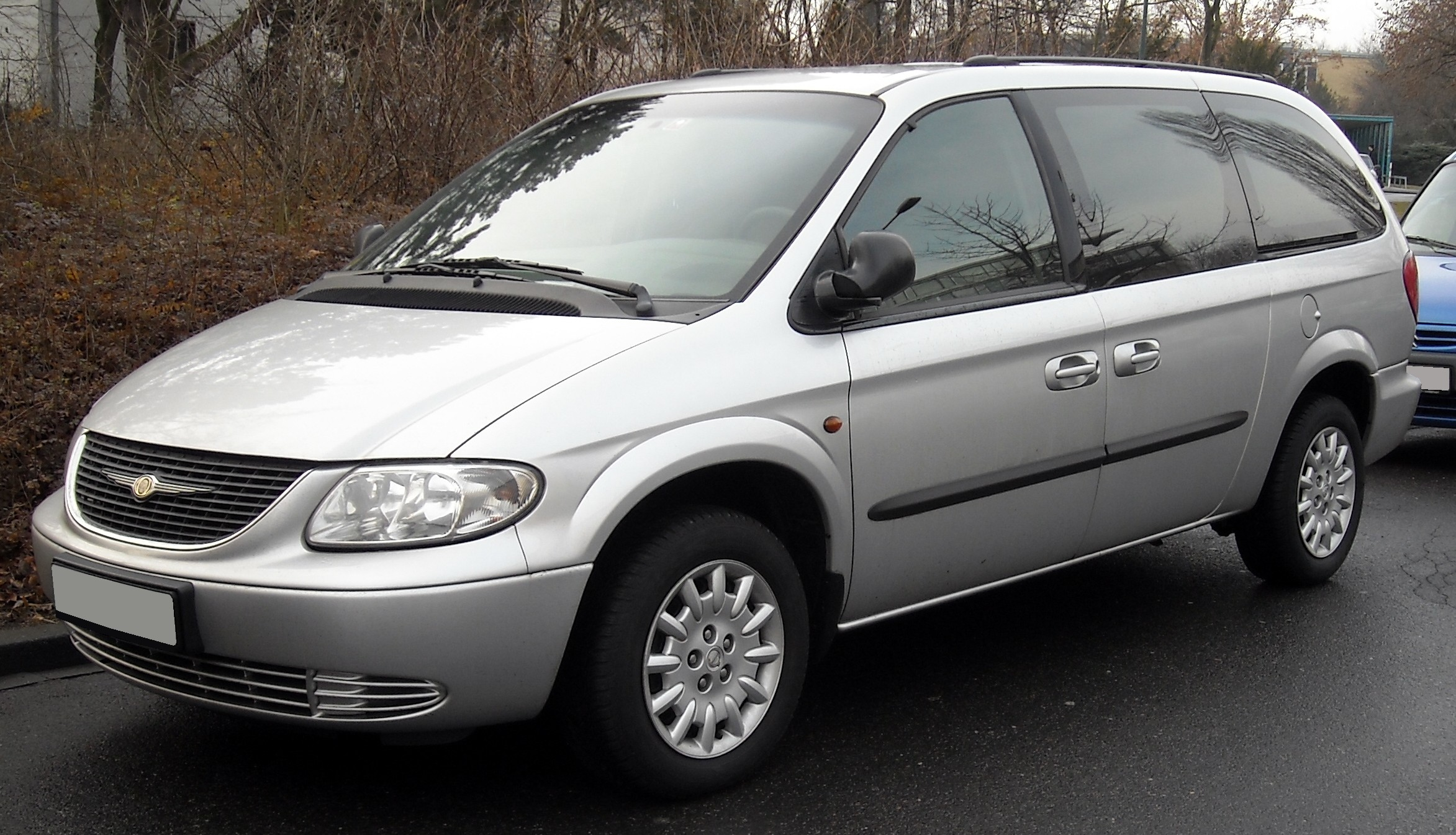

Overview
- Also called: Chrysler Caravan; Chrysler Grand Caravan (Argentina and Brazil); Chrysler Grand Voyager (LWB model); Chrysler Voyager (SWB model); Chrysler Ram Van (The Netherlands, Panel Van)
- Production: 2000–2007; 2008–2010 (China)
- Assembly: Austria: Graz (Eurostar); Canada: Windsor, Ontario (Windsor Assembly); China: Fuzhou (Soueast); United States: Fenton, Missouri (Saint Louis Assembly South)

Body and chassis
- Body style: 4-door minivan
- Layout: Front-engine, front-wheel drive / Four-wheel drive
- Platform: Chrysler RG Platform; Chrysler RS platform
- Related: Chrysler Town & Country; Dodge Caravan

Powertrain
- Engine: 2.4 L EDZ I4; 3.0 L Mitsubishi 6G72 (China); 3.3 L EGA V6; 3.8 L EGH V6; 2.5 L VM Motori R 425 DOHC CRD VGT (turbo diesel); 2.8 L VM Motori R 428 DOHC CRD (turbo diesel)
- Transmission: 3-speed 31TH automatic 4-speed 41TE automatic 5-speed manual

Dimensions
- Wheelbase: 113.3 in (2,878 mm); Grand Voyager: 119.3 in (3,030 mm)
- Length: 189.1 in (4,803 mm); 2001–02 LX: 189.3 in (4,808 mm); Grand Voyager: 200.5 in (5,093 mm)
- Width: 78.6 in (1,996 mm)
- Height: 68.9 in (1,750 mm); 2001–2003 Grand Voyager: 1,748 mm (68.8 in); 2005–present: 1,750 mm (68.9 in)

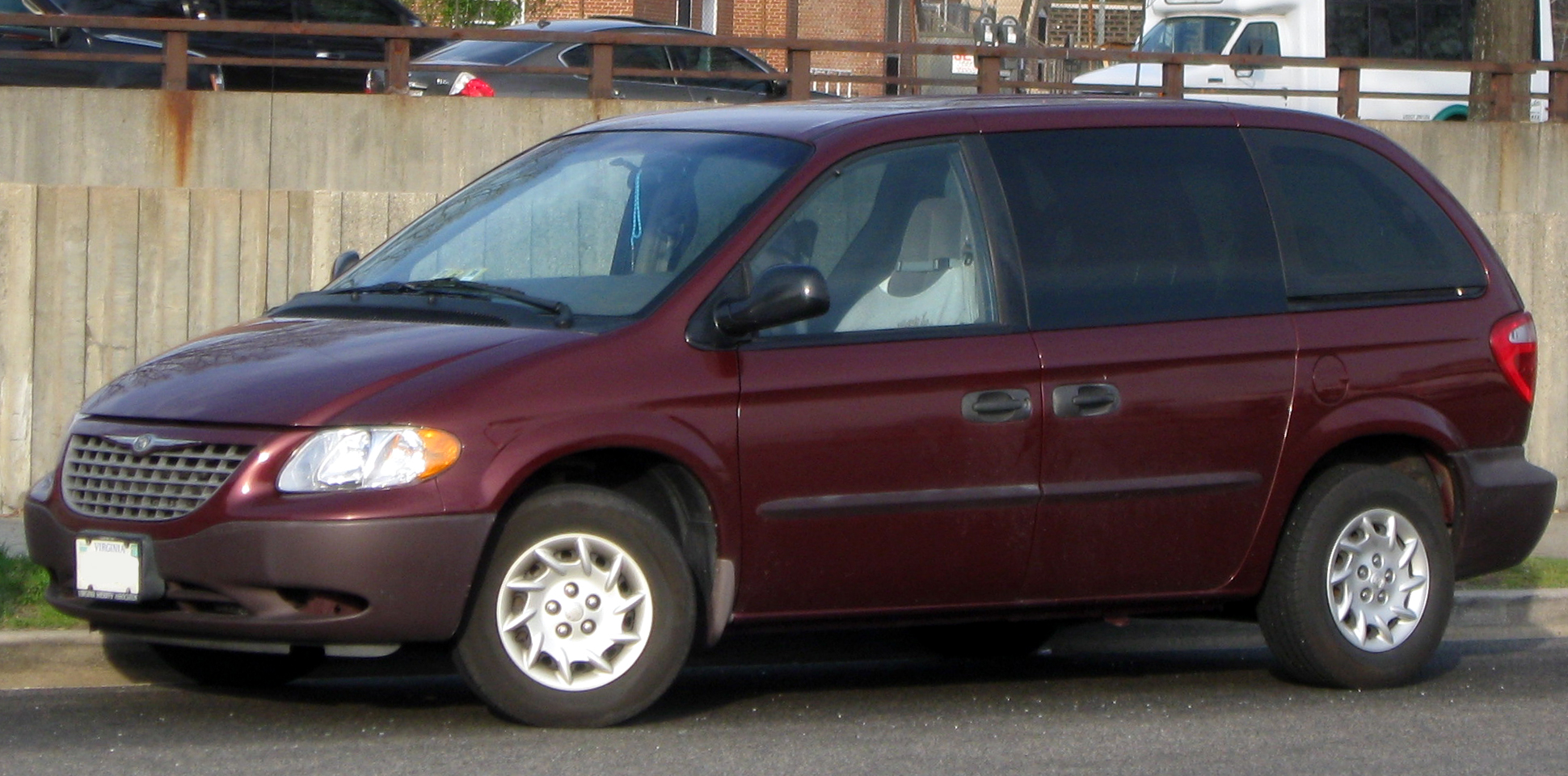
2001–2003 Chrysler Voyager (US)

From 2001 until 2003, the Voyager was offered in the SWB model only, replacing the SWB Plymouth Voyager. It resembled the Town and Country more than the previous generation, the only major cosmetic difference besides the trim (where the Town and Country's is fancier) was the placement of the Chrysler emblem on the grille. After the 2003 model year, the Voyager was discontinued (United States market) and replaced by the Chrysler Town and Country, SWB model. The SWB Town & Country continued under the Voyager name in the Mexican market.

=== Engines ===
- 2001–2008 3.3 L EGA V6
- 2001–2008 3.8 L EGH V6
- 2001–2008 2.4 L EDZ I4
- 2008–2011 (China) 3.0 L 6G72 V6

=== Year to year changes ===
- 2000: The Voyager is sold as a Plymouth and as a Chrysler, with the same options and features, however the Chrysler versions have sticker prices of about US$500 more.
- 2001: The Chrysler Voyager was completely redesigned for this year as were the other Chrysler minivans. It was now only sold under the Chrysler marque; no "Grand" LWB versions are sold. Some new features include side airbags and an optional navigation system.
- 2002: Either a VCR or a DVD-based rear-seat entertainment system was a new option available for dealer installation on all 2002 Voyagers. A high-value entry-level model, the eC was offered this year along with the base and LX models. All 2002 Voyagers now used a four-speed automatic transmission.
- 2003: Power-adjustable brake and accelerator pedals were available on 2003 Voyagers. Anti-lock brakes remained optional for the upscale LX, but were no longer available for base Voyagers. The Voyager was discontinued after this year and was replaced by the little-changed SWB Town and Country.

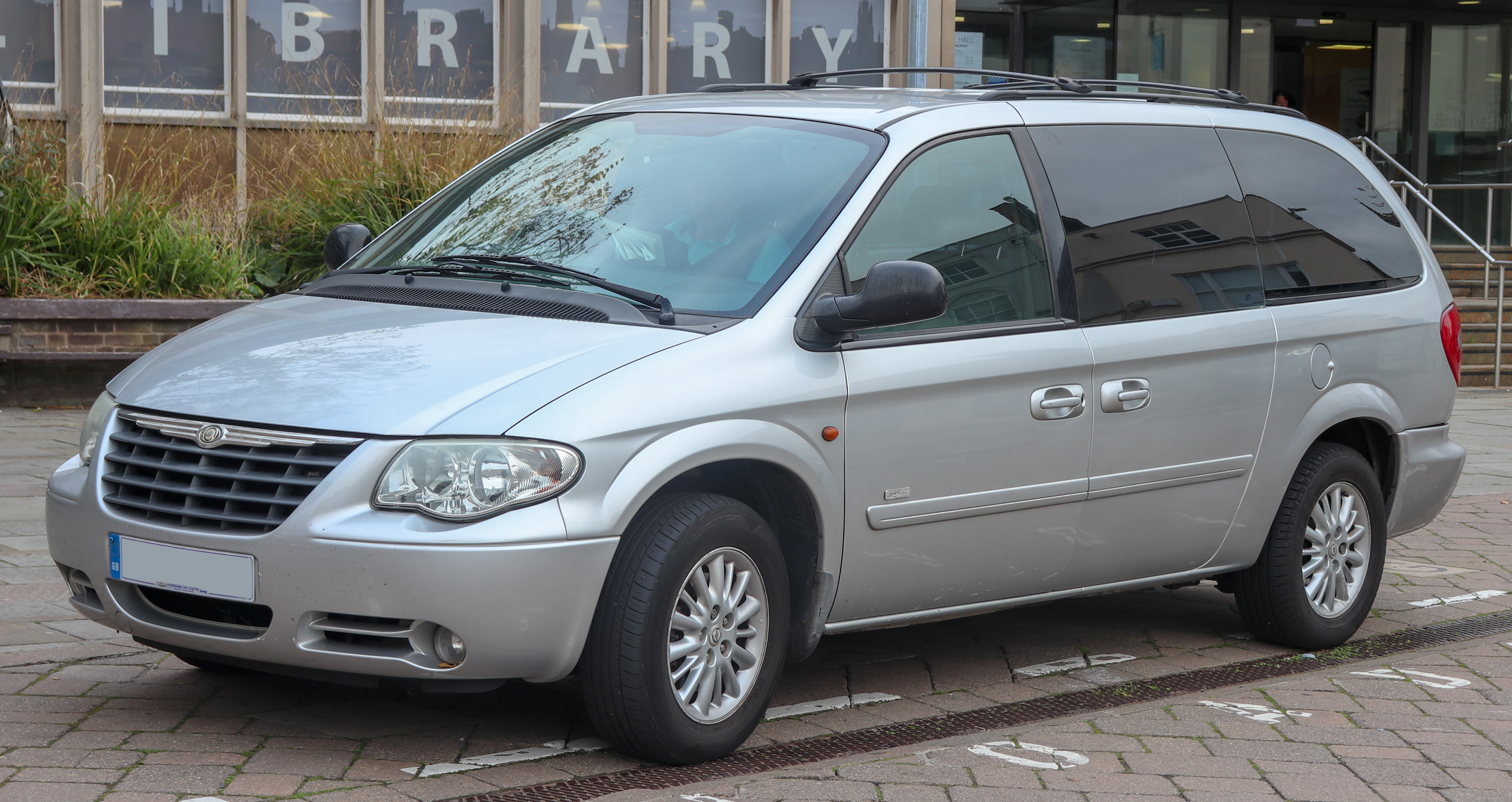
2007 Chrysler Grand Voyager (United Kingdom)

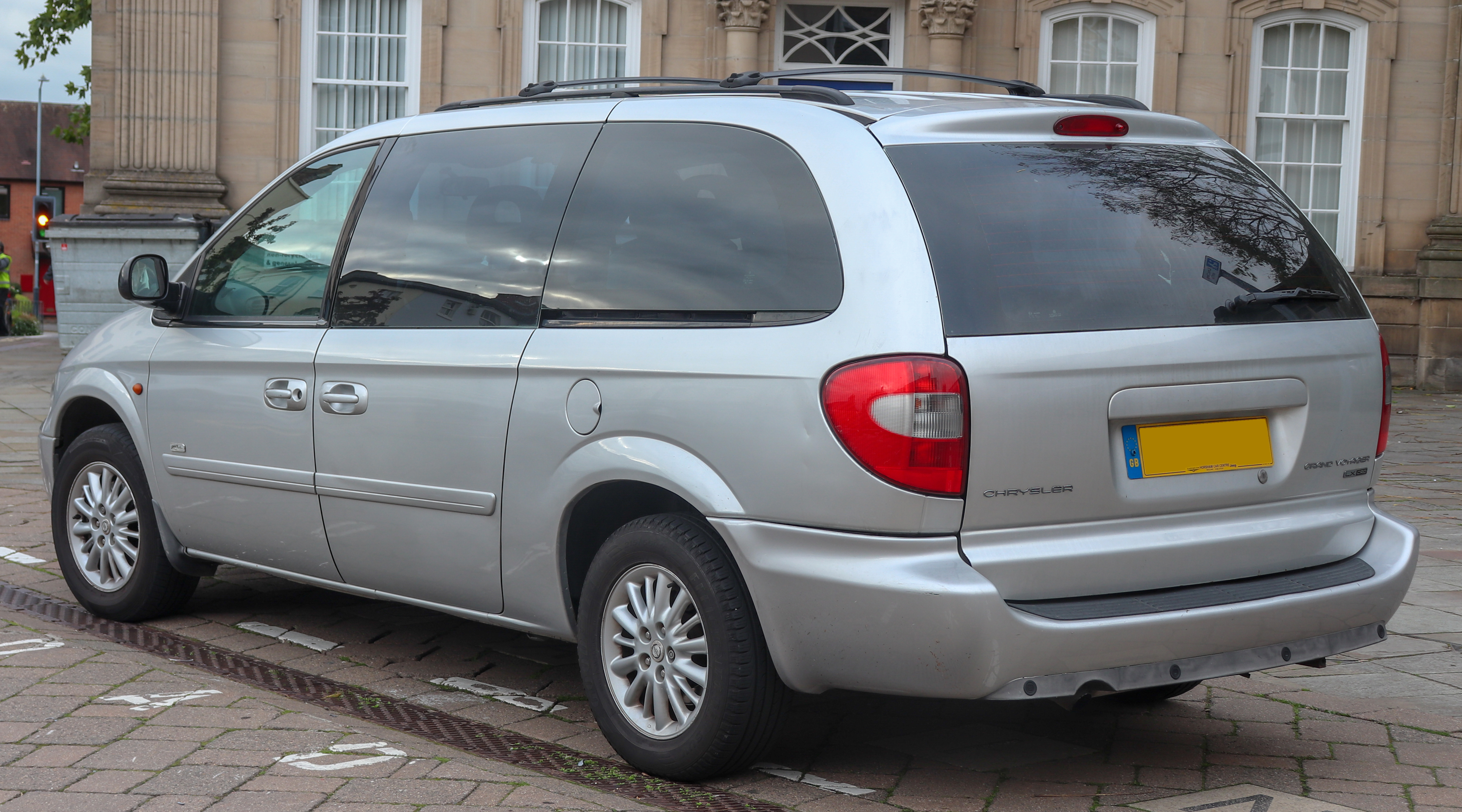
2007 Chrysler Grand Voyager (United Kingdom)

In Europe Chrysler began offering the Voyager with the first generation, followed by the second generation model in 2001, with a new engine range – including larger, more economical diesel engines (2.5 L and for 2005 – the 2.8 L 4 cylinder from VM Motori) and more fuel-efficient gasoline engines (I4 and V6).

The fourth generation Grand Voyager continued production for the Chinese market alongside the Dodge Grand Caravan until late 2010. Both models were built by Soueast in China, using a Town & Country production line relocated from Taiwan, and were powered by Mitsubishi 6G72 engines.

=== Safety ===
ANCAP test results Chrysler Voyager (2008)
Test	Score
Overall	2 /5 stars
Frontal offset	3.15/16
Side impact	15.68/16
Pole	1/2
Seat belt reminders	0/3
Whiplash protection	Not Assessed
Pedestrian protection	Poor
Electronic stability control	Not Available

== Fifth generation (2008–2016) ==
Fifth generation
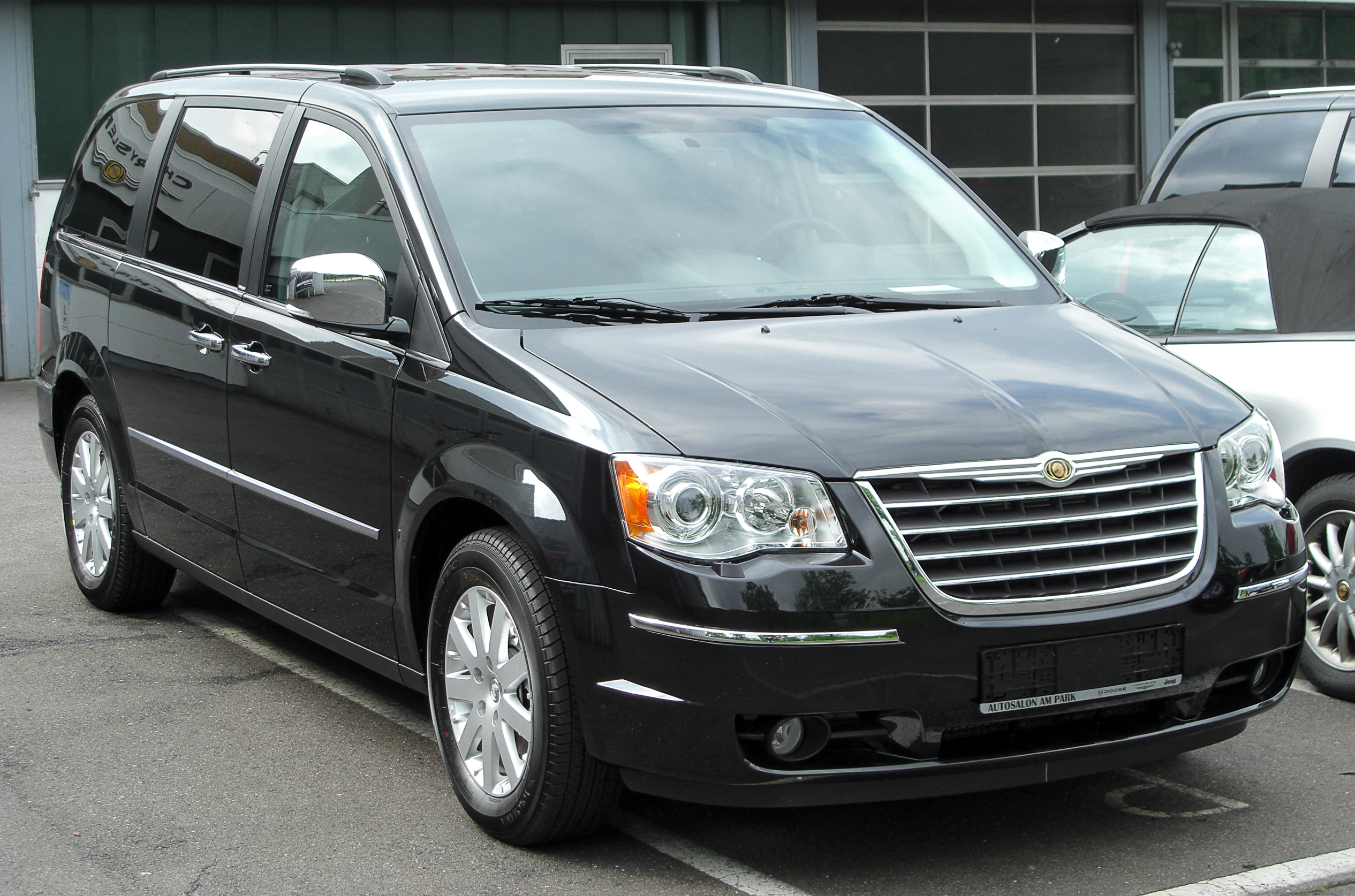

Overview
- Also called: Lancia Voyager
- Production: 2007–2016
- Assembly: Canada: Windsor, Ontario (Windsor Assembly)
- Designer: Ralph Gilles

Body and chassis
- Body style: 4-door minivan
- Layout: Transverse front-engine, front-wheel drive
- Platform: Chrysler RT platform
- Related: Chrysler Town & Country; Dodge Grand Caravan; Volkswagen Routan

Powertrain
- Engine: 2.8 L VM Motori RA428 DOHC CRD I4 (turbo diesel); 3.6 L Pentastar V6; 3.8 L EGH V6
- Transmission: 6-speed 62TE automatic

Dimensions
- Wheelbase: 121.2 in (3,078 mm)
- Length: 202.5 in (5,144 mm)
- Width: 78.7 in (1,999 mm)
- Height: 68.9 in (1,750 mm)

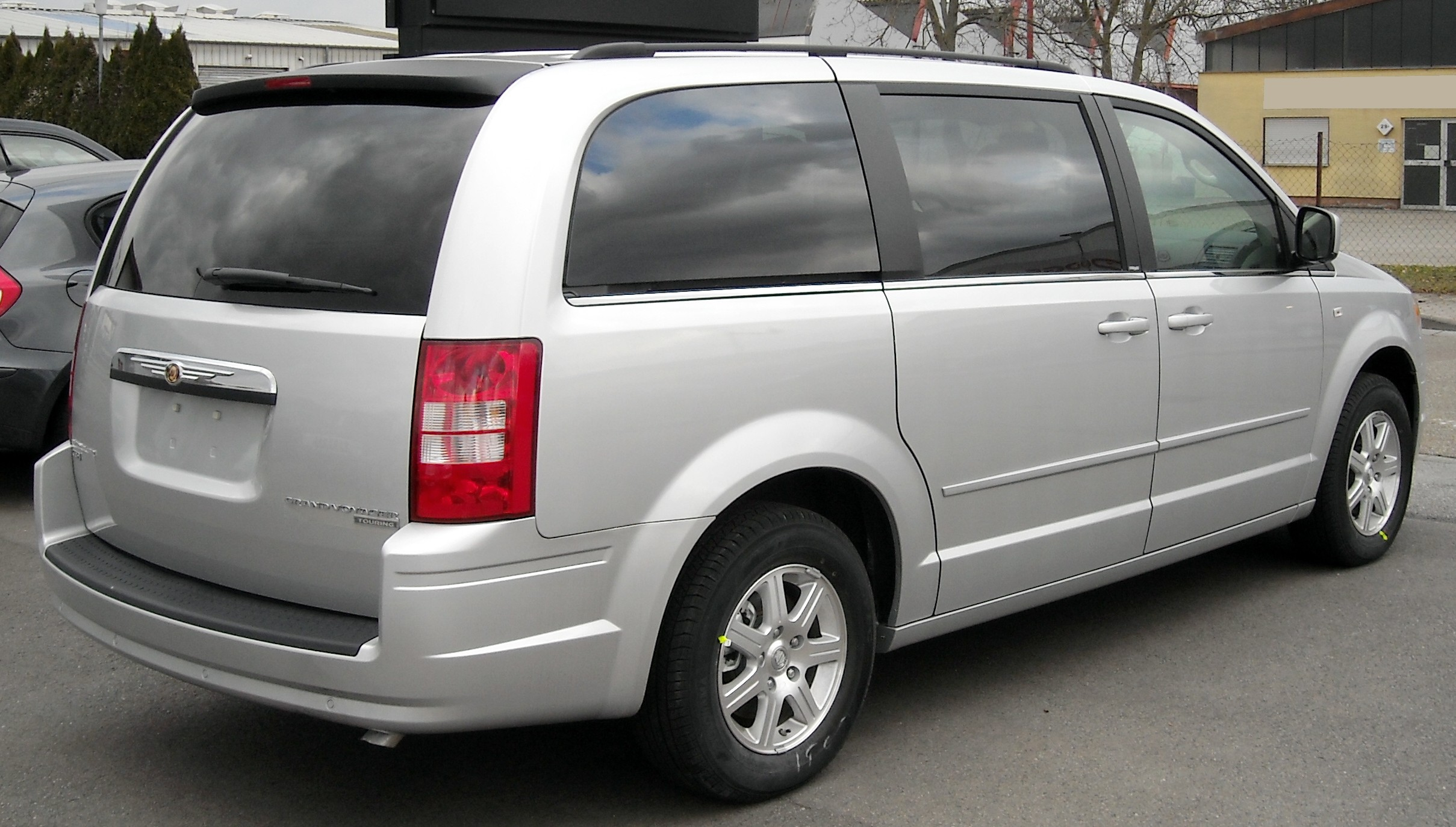
Chrysler Grand Voyager

Chrysler introduced the new Grand Voyager for 2008 and successfully positioned it in the automotive market as a luxury MPV suited for large families. Some versions of Grand Voyager are visually identical to the Chrysler Town & Country which is sold in the North American and South American markets. In a similar fashion to the other large multi-purpose vehicles (MPVs) on the market, the Grand Voyager was sold with a standard diesel engine in Europe. This was also the first generation of the model that was not sold as the Chrysler Grand Caravan; markets in which it was previously sold under that nameplate received as either the Grand Voyager or Town & Country.

However, the seating is arranged in the 2–2–3 (front to rear) layout common in North America, rather than the 2–3–2 layout often seen in SUVs and MPVs in Europe. On right-hand drive (RHD) models the gear shift lever is placed on a floor-mounted console between the seats, in contrast to the instrument panel positioning found on LHD models.

=== Standard engine ===
- 2008–2015: 2.8 L (2776 cc) CRD I4, 163 hp (122 kW) at 3800 rpm and 265 lb⋅ft (359 N⋅m) at 1600 rpm. (RA 428 DOHC)

The 2009 Grand Voyager with diesel motor gets a combined fuel economy of 9.3 L/100 km (30 mpg_{‑imp}; 25 mpg_{‑US}).

Optional engine on top of the range Limited models:

- 2008–2010: 3.8 L (3778 cc, 230.5 cu in) EGH V6, 197 hp (147 kW) at 5200 rpm and 230 lb·ft (312 N·m) at 4000 rpm
- 2008-2010 4.0L grand caravan sxt crysler pacifica (standard) , routan
- 2010–2015: 3.6 L (3604 cc, 220 cu in) Pentastar V6, 283 hp (211 kW) at 6600 rpm and 260 lb·ft (353 N·m) at 4800 rpm

All engines are paired with Chrysler's 62TE 6-speed automatic transmission with variable line pressure (VLP) technology (See Ultradrive).

=== Lancia Voyager ===
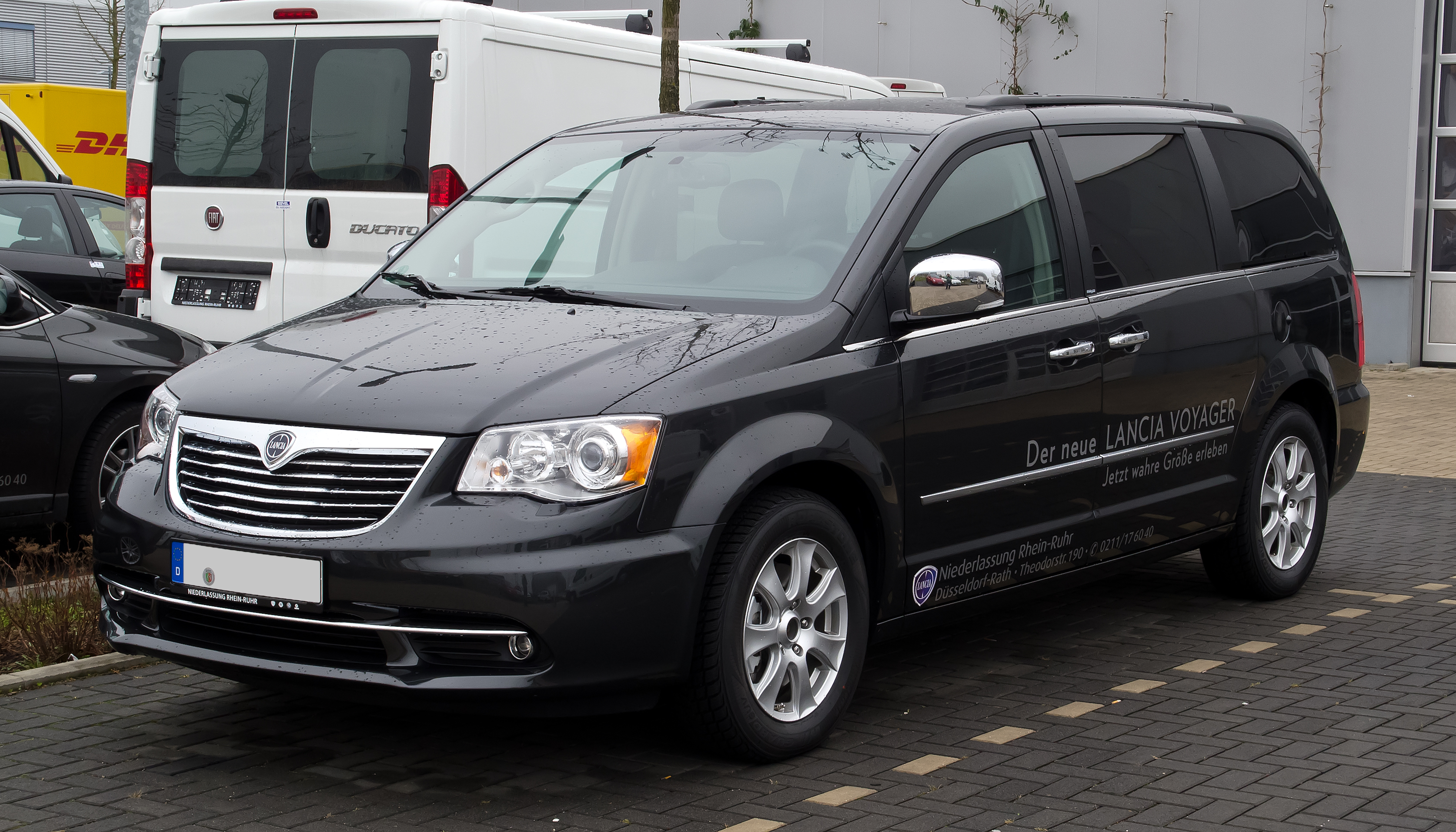
Lancia Voyager

All Grand Voyagers sold since October 2011 in continental Europe are sold under the Lancia brand as the Lancia Voyager.

The Chrysler-branded Grand Voyager continued to be sold in the United Kingdom, Ireland, Russia, Australia, New Zealand, the Middle East, South Africa, South Korea, Singapore, and China, until the end of production, as Lancia does not have sales operations in those markets. Voyager became the successor to previous unrelated series of minivans produced by Lancia, the last of which is the Phedra.

However, the parent company Fiat Chrysler Automobiles under the leadership of CEO Sergio Marchionne has decided to shut down both Chrysler and Lancia brands out of its European market (with the exception of keeping one model of Lancia available for sale in Italy). Due to this decision, the Lancia Voyager too is no longer being sold in Europe.

=== European engines ===
The Lancia version is offered with engines compliant with Euro V emission standards.

Model	Engine	Displacement	Max. power	Max. torque	Years
3.6 Pentastar automatic	V6, Gasoline	3,604 cc	208 kW (279 hp)	344 N⋅m (254 lb⋅ft)	2011–2016
2.8 Turbo Diesel automatic	straight-4, Diesel	2,777 cc	120 kW (161 hp)	360 N⋅m (266 lb⋅ft)	2011–2013
2.8 Turbo Diesel automatic	straight-4, Diesel	2,777 cc	131 kW (176 hp)	360 N⋅m (266 lb⋅ft)	2013–2015

=== Safety ===
Euro NCAP test results Lancia Voyager (2011)
Test	Points	%
Overall:	4 /5 stars	
Adult occupant:	29	79%
Child occupant:	33	67%
Pedestrian:	17	47%
Safety assist:	5	71%

== Sixth generation (2020–2026) ==
Sixth generation
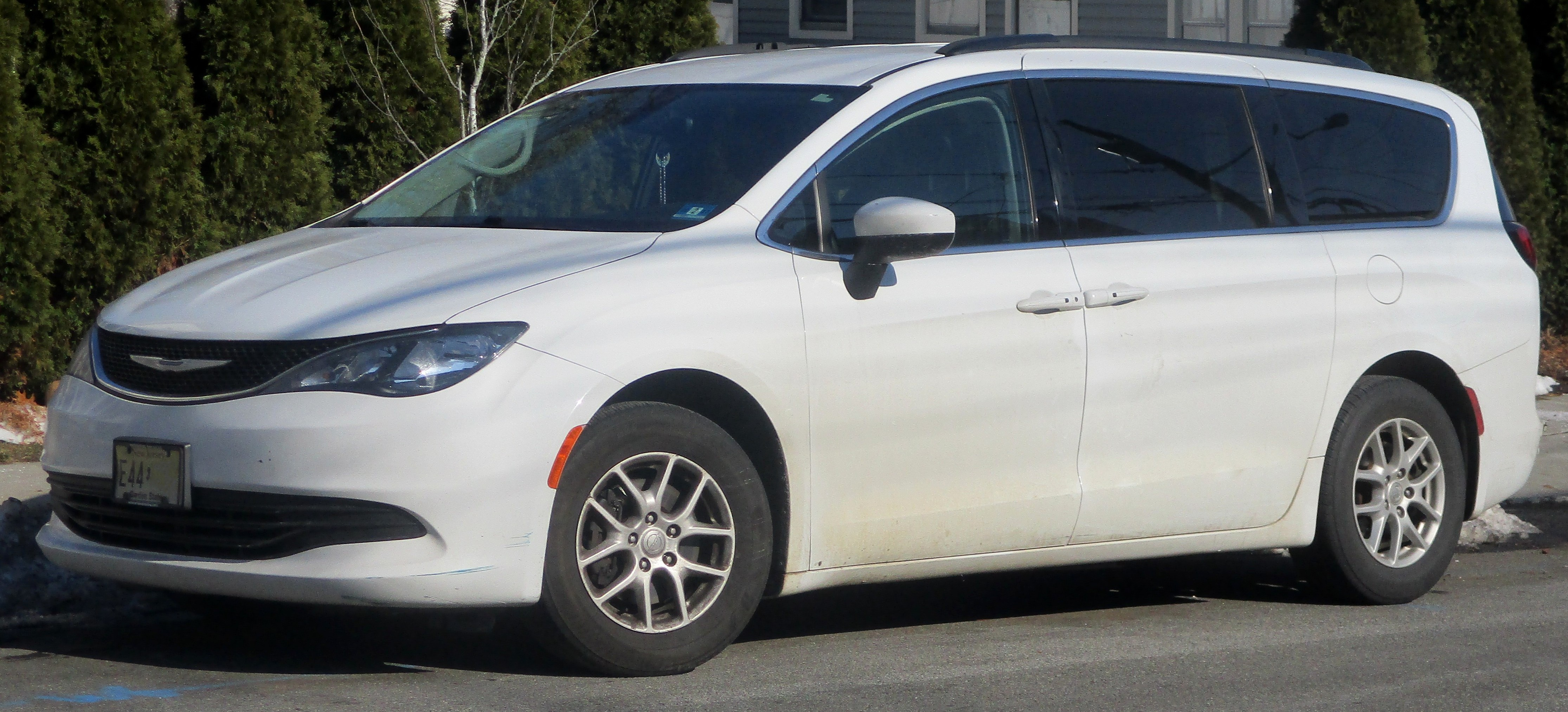
- 2020 Chrysler Voyager

Overview
- Also called: Chrysler Grand Caravan (Canada)
- Production: 2019–2026
- Model years: 2020–2021; 2025–2026 (public); 2022–2024 (fleet only)
- Assembly: Canada: Windsor, Ontario (Windsor Assembly)
- Designer: Irina Zavatski; Winnie Cheung (interior)

Body and chassis
- Class: Minivan
- Layout: FF layout
- Platform: Compact Wide
- Related: Chrysler 200 (UF)

Powertrain
- Engine: 3.6 L Pentastar V6 (gasoline)
- Transmission: 9-speed ZF 948TE automatic

Dimensions
- Wheelbase: 121.6 in (3,089 mm)
- Length: 203.6 in (5,171 mm)
- Width: 79.6 in (2,022 mm)
- Height: 69.9 in (1,775 mm)
- Curb weight: 1,964 kg (4,330 lb)

Chronology
- Predecessor: Dodge Grand Caravan (LWB); Chrysler minivans (RT); Chrysler Pacifica L/LX Ram Promaster City (Cargo versions)
- Successor: Chrysler Pacifica LX

For the 2020 model year, the Chrysler Pacifica's low-end L and LX models were separated from the Pacifica lineup and given the Voyager name. This marks the return of the Voyager nameplate to the Chrysler model lineup, in which it was last used in 2016, and the North American market, in which it was last used in 2003 and 2008 in the United States and Mexico, respectively. In addition to the L and LX trim levels, an LXi model will be available to fleet customers.

The 2020 Voyager went on sale in the U.S. in the fall of 2019 with base prices ranging from $26,985 for the entry L model to $32,995 for the fleet-only LXi model. Seven-passenger seating, a six-speaker sound system with Active Noise Cancellation, Apple CarPlay and Android Auto are standard on all models. Among the available options is the SafetyTec Group which includes rear park assist, blind-spot monitoring, and rear cross-path detection. The LX adds SiriusXM Satellite Radio and seventeen-inch aluminum-alloy wheels. The fleet-only LXi adds easy-clean leatherette-trimmed seating surfaces and dual heated front bucket seats. LX and LXi models offer a single-screen rear DVD entertainment system as on option. All Voyagers will be powered by the same 3.6 L Pentastar V6 gasoline engine with Variable Valve Timing (VVT) that powers the Chrysler Pacifica, producing 287 hp (214 kW) and 262 lb⋅ft (355 N⋅m) of torque, mated to the ZF-manufactured 948TE nine-speed automatic transmission controlled by a rotary control knob mounted in the Voyager's center console. Unlike the Chrysler Pacifica, which is available with either front-wheel drive (FWD) or all-wheel drive (AWD), the Voyager is only offered with front-wheel drive.

Production of the Dodge Grand Caravan ended in 2020, thereby making Voyager the new entry minivan in FCA's U.S. lineup. In Canada, the Voyager nameplate was not in use for 2020 and all models still carried the Pacifica name. In the 2021 model year, FCA began selling Voyager as the Chrysler Grand Caravan in Canada.

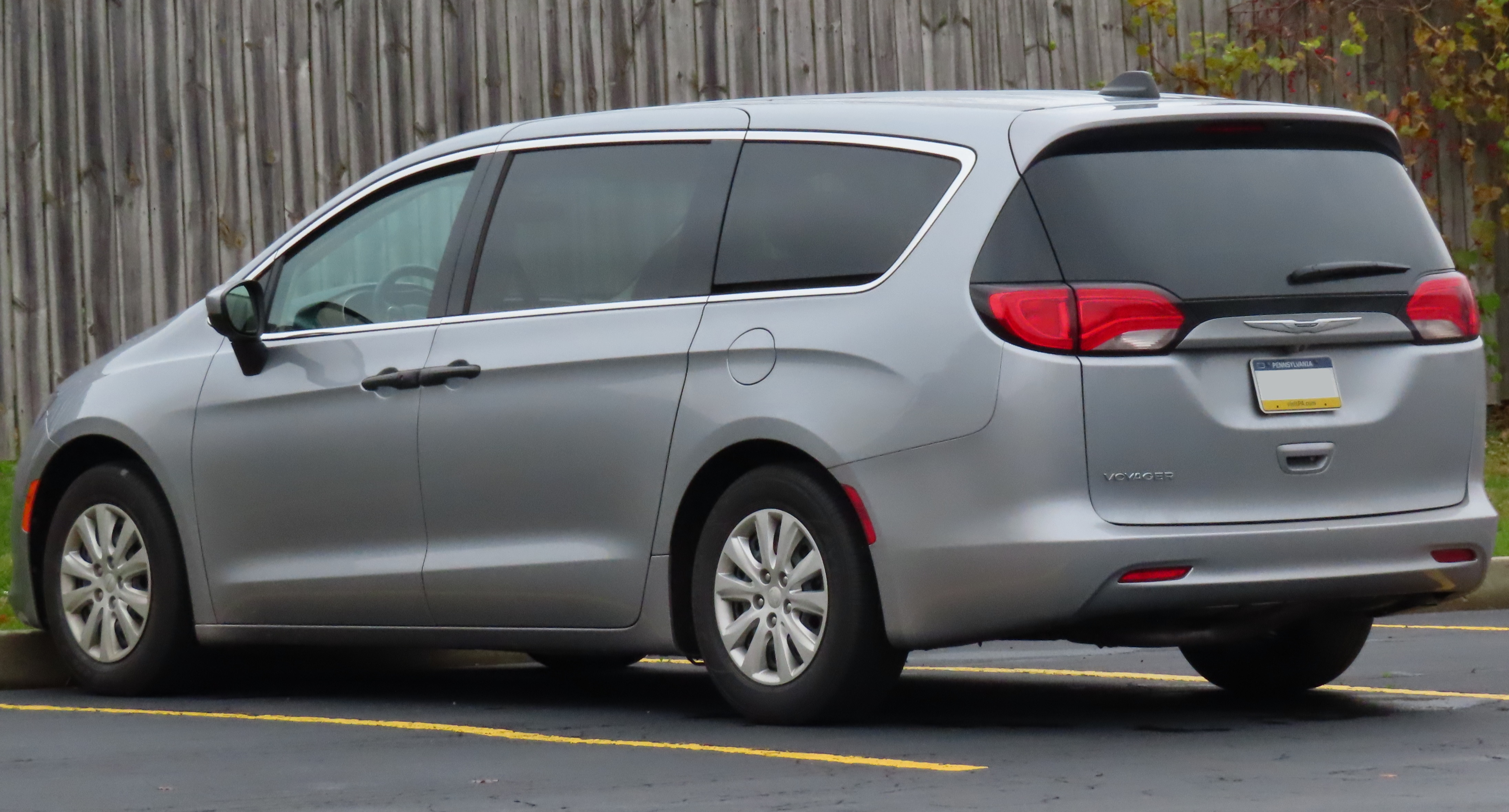
Rear view

The 2022 Voyager was targeted exclusively for fleet buyers. Only offered in the LX model, the 2022 Voyager included standard features such as heated front seats and steering wheel, second-row Stow 'n Go seats, clear air filtration system, Uconnect 5 system as well as power sliding doors and rear lift gate. There were just two option packages, providing more driver-assist and connectivity features.

The fleet-only 2022 Voyager model is predicted by Kelley Blue Book to have "attractive deals on the used market" as the rental companies begin selling them in a few years.

Public sales of the Voyager were discontinued in 2021, making it a fleet exclusive model. For the 2023 model year, the LX remained the only model on offer. The Voyager returned to the retail market for the 2025 model year, offered exclusively in an unnamed base trim. In 2026, for the 2027 model year, the LX model was reintegrated into the Pacifica, while still retaining the pre-facelift design.

== Seating features ==
The Chrysler Voyager has incorporated various seating systems for their minivans to enhance interior flexibility.

=== Integrated child safety seats ===
In 1992, Chrysler introduced a second-row bench seat integrating two child booster seats. These seats continued as an available option through fifth generation until they were discontinued in 2010.

=== Easy Out Roller Seats ===
In 1996, Chrysler introduced a system of seats to simplify installation, removal, and re-positioning— marketed as Easy-Out Roller Seats. The system remained in use throughout the life of the Chrysler Voyager.

When installed, the seats are latched to floor-mounted strikers. When unlatched, eight rollers lift each seat, allowing it to be rolled fore and aft. Tracks have locator depressions for rollers, thus enabling simple installation. Ergonomic levers at the seatbacks release the floor latches single-handedly without tools and raise the seats onto the rollers in a single motion. Additionally, seatbacks were designed to fold forward. Seat roller tracks are permanently attached to the floor and seat stanchions are aligned, facilitating the longitudinal rolling of the seats. Bench seat stanchions were moved inboard to reduce bending stress in the seat frames, allowing them to be lighter.

When configured as two- and three-person benches, the Easy Out Roller Seats could be unwieldy. Beginning in 2001, second and third-row seats became available in a 'quad' configuration – bucket or captain chairs in the second row and a third-row three-person 50/50 split "bench" — with each section weighing under 50 lb (23 kg).

=== Stow'n Go seating ===
In 2005, Chrysler introduced a system of second and third-row seating that folded completely into under-floor compartments – marketed as Stow 'n Go seating and exclusively available on long-wheelbase models.

In a development program costing $400 million, engineers used an erector set to initially help visualize the complex interaction of the design and redesigned underfloor components to accommodate the system — including the spare tire well, fuel tank, exhaust system, parking brake cables, rear climate control lines, and the rear suspension. Even so, the new seating system precluded incorporation of an AWD system, effectively ending that option for the Chrysler minivans.

The system in turn creates a combined volume of 12 cubic feet (340 L) of under-floor storage when second-row seats are deployed. With both rows folded, the vans have a flat load floor and a maximum cargo volume of 160.7 cubic feet (4,550 L).

The Stow 'n Go system received Popular Science Magazine's "Best of What's New" for 2005 award.

The Stow 'n Go system is not offered on the Volkswagen Routan, a rebadged nameplate variant of the Chrysler minivans.

=== Swivel 'n Go seating ===
Chrysler introduced a seating system in 2008, marketed as Swivel'n Go. In the seating system, two full-size second-row seats swivel to face the third row. A detachable table can be placed between the second and third-row seats. The Swivel'n Go seating system includes the third-row seating from the Stow'n Go system.

The system is noted for its high strength. The entire load of the seat in the event of a crash is transferred through the swivel mechanism, which is almost twice as strong as the minimum government requirement.

The swivel mechanism includes bumpers that stabilize the seat while in the lock position. When rotated the seat comes off these bumpers to allow easy rotation.

The seat is not meant to be left in an unlocked position or swiveled with the occupant in it, although this will not damage the swivel mechanism.

== Production worldwide ==
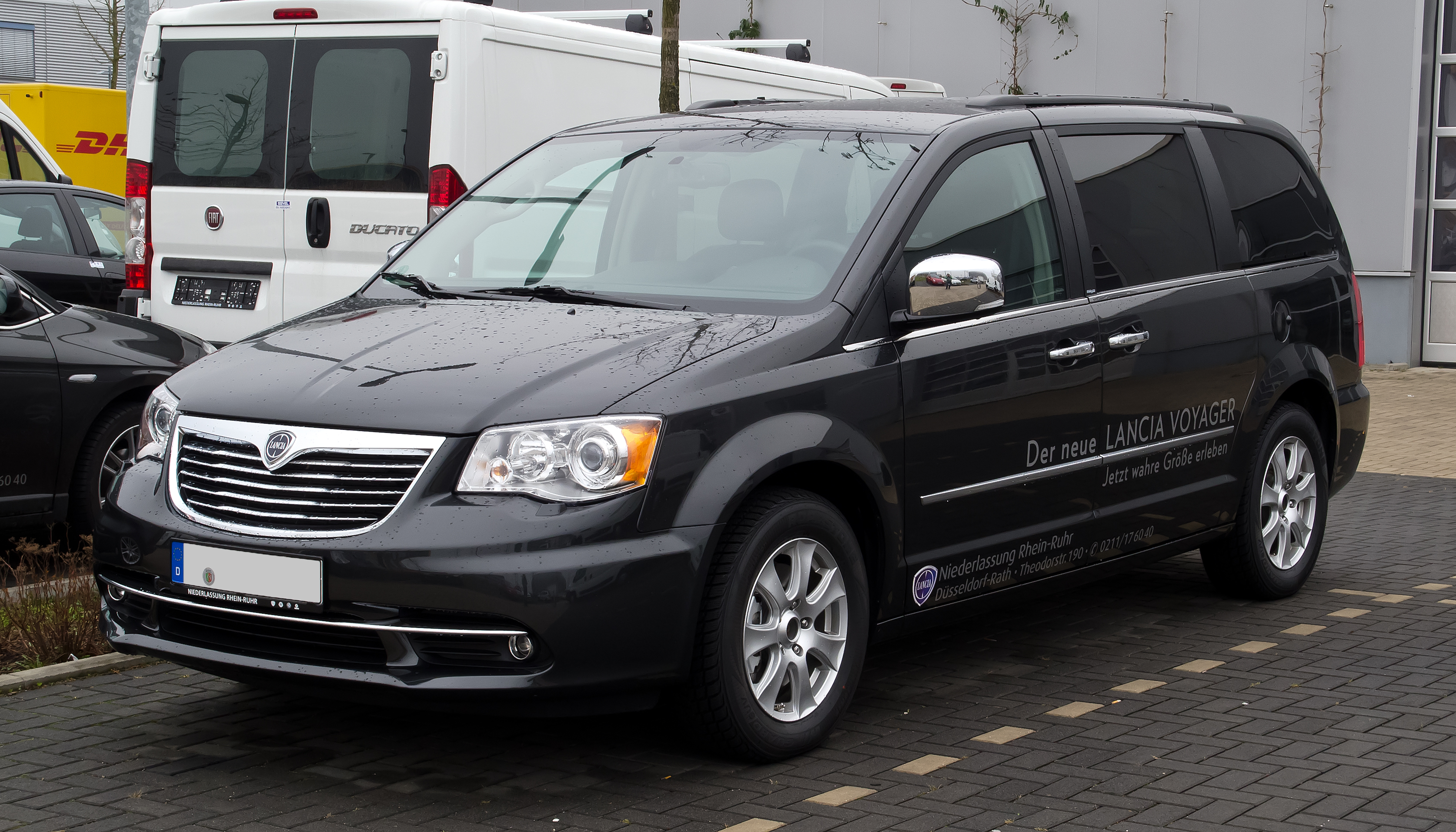
European Lancia Voyager in Germany

In the early years of its marketing (1988–1991), the Voyager was manufactured in North America and exported to Europe. The Voyager began to be manufactured in Europe in 1991, at the Eurostar plant near Graz, Austria. Eurostar was a joint venture between Chrysler and the Austrian company Steyr-Daimler-Puch. It was later acquired by DaimlerChrysler and finally the plant was sold to Magna Steyr in 2002. The minivan production ended there at the end of 2007. Units produced in Austria were marketed in Europe, Asia, and Africa. They were built with gasoline and diesel engines, with manual transmission, in short-wheelbase (SWB) and long-wheelbase versions, and in right and left-hand drive versions (all sold as Chrysler Voyager).

From 2008 until 2010, the fourth generation Grand Voyager was produced in China by Soueast using a relocated Taiwanese Town & Country assembly line.

The fifth generation Voyagers (2008–2011) have been exported to Europe from Windsor, Canada, where they are produced. Beginning in October 2011, they were exported and sold as the Lancia Voyager in most European markets, as Chrysler operations were merged with those of Lancia in many European countries. In the United Kingdom, only the Grand Voyager is marketed.

Since 2011, the Voyager is sold under the Lancia badge in Continental Europe to strengthen the Chrysler-Lancia integration, though it remains branded as the Chrysler Grand Voyager in the United Kingdom and Ireland. In March 2015, Fiat Group announced that in 2017, Chrysler would be discontinued in the United Kingdom. It was removed from Chrysler UK's website in January 2016.
