= Chrysler minivans (RS) =

Series of American minivans

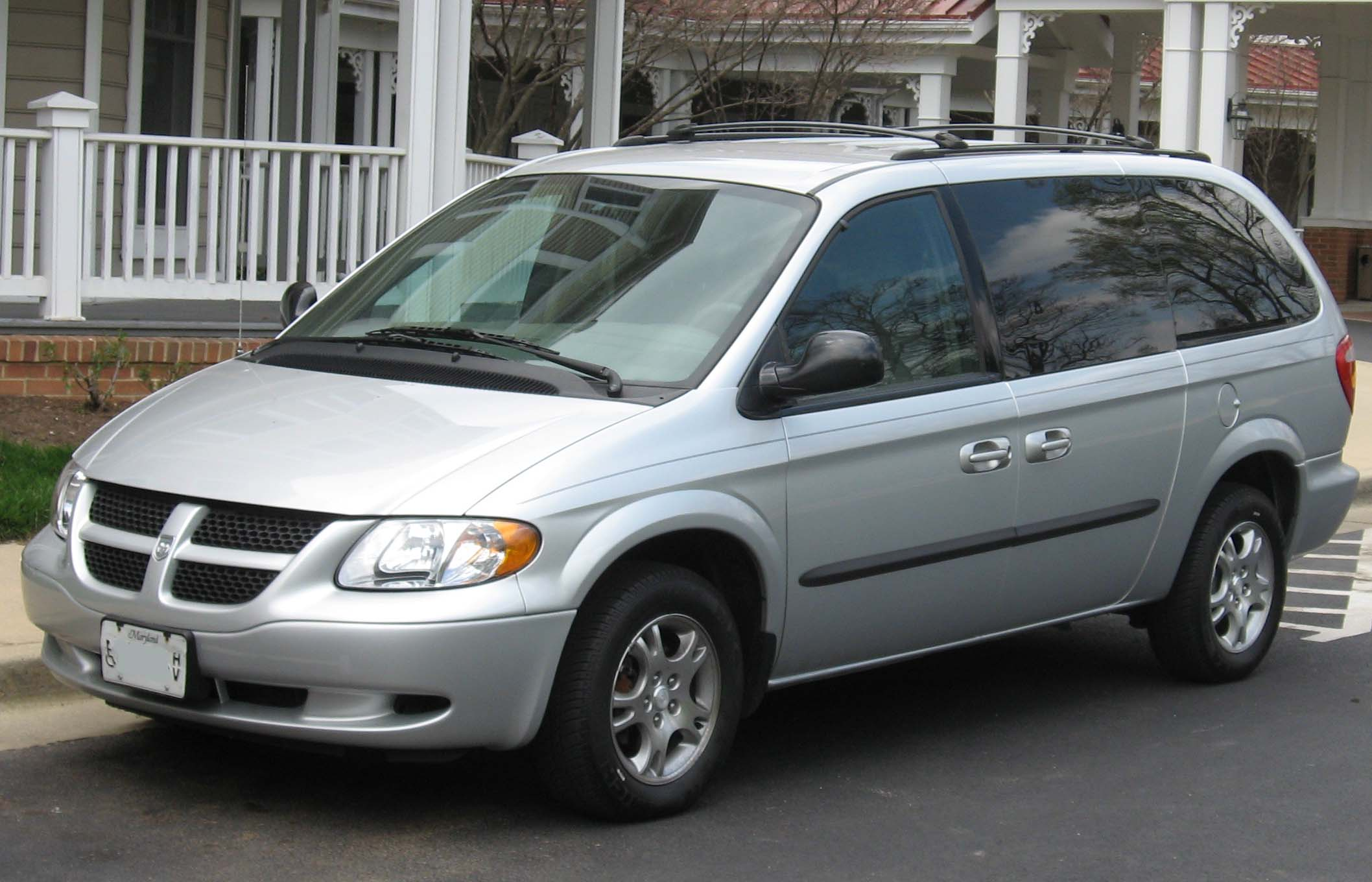

Overview
- Manufacturer: DaimlerChrysler (2001–2007); Chrysler LLC (2007)
- Also called: Dodge Caravan; Chrysler Voyager; Chrysler Town & Country; Dodge Grand Caravan (LWB); Chrysler Grand Voyager (LWB); Chrysler Caravan (Brazil); Chrysler Grand Caravan (LWB, Brazil); Chrysler Ram Van (Netherlands, Panel Van); Dodge Ram Van (Netherlands, Panel Van)
- Production: July 24, 2000 – July 2007; 2007–2010 (China)
- Model years: 2001–2007
- Assembly: Windsor Assembly, Windsor, Ontario, Canada; Fenton, Missouri, United States; Graz, Austria (Eurostar); Fuzhou, China (Soueast: 2007–2010); Taoyuan, Taiwan (CMC: 2005–2007)
- Designer: Brandon Faurote (1997)

Body and chassis
- Body style: 4-door minivan
- Layout: Front-engine, front-wheel drive / all-wheel drive
- Platform: Chrysler RS platform Chrysler RG Platform
- Related: Chrysler Pacifica

Powertrain
- Engine: 2.4 L EDZ I4; 3.0L Mitsubishi 6G72 V6 (China); 3.3 L EGA V6; 3.8 L EGH V6 2; 2.5 L Turbo Diesel R 425; 2.8 L Turbo Diesel R 428
- Transmission: 3-speed 31TH automatic with 2.4EDZ; 4-speed 41TE automatic 5-speed manual

Dimensions
- Wheelbase: SWB: 113.3 in (2,878 mm); LWB: 119.3 in (3,030 mm)
- Length: 2001–2004 SWB: 189.1 in (4,803 mm); 2005–2007 SWB: 189.3 in (4,808 mm); LWB: 200.5 in (5,093 mm)/200.6 in (5,095 mm)
- Width: 78.6 in (1,996 mm)
- Height: 68.9 in (1,750 mm)

Chronology
- Predecessor: Chrysler minivans (NS)
- Successor: Chrysler minivans (RT); Dodge Journey (For SWB Version)

The fourth generation of the Chrysler minivans are a series of minivans produced by Chrysler from the 2001 to 2007 model years. A substantial revision of the previous design, the fourth-generation design received an all-new chassis and body design. The generation marked the retirement of the Plymouth brand (during its launch), the return of the cargo van variant, and the replacement of removable seating with fold-flat second and third-row (Stow 'N Go) seating. In another design change, the dual sliding doors introduced by the previous generation became a standard feature.

Officially designated the Chrysler RS platform, the dual-wheelbase body again made its return. Coinciding with the retirement of the Plymouth brand, the nameplates underwent a revision, with the Voyager living on as the entry-level Chrysler minivan (adopting its export nameplate), slotted below the Dodge (Grand) Caravan and the Chrysler Town & Country. For 2004, the RS platform became the basis of the Chrysler Pacifica, a three-row full-size CUV sized closely with the long-wheelbase minivans.

As with previous generations, the RS-platform minivans were assembled by Chrysler at its Windsor Assembly facility (Windsor, Ontario, Canada), supplemented by Saint Louis Assembly (Fenton, Missouri). This would be the final generation of Chrysler minivans assembled by Eurostar, later Magna Steyr (Graz, Austria) .

== Design overview ==
In development from February 1996 to December 1999, the 2001 design was intended as an extensive evolution of the NS generation. Design work by Brandon Faurote was approved in January 1997 and reached production approval in October 1997.

Unveiled at the 2000 North American International Auto Show (NAIAS), the model line release was part of a promotional tie-in with Nabisco, which unveiled their new "Mini Oreos" inside the van during the unveiling. The first RS-generation minivans left the Windsor assembly line on July 24, 2000, entering sale for August.

=== Chassis ===
The RS-platform chassis carried both wheelbase lengths from its NS platform; short-wheelbase vans used a 113.3-inch length while long-wheelbase vans used a 119.3-inch length (unchanged since 1994). The suspension was carried over, including front MacPherson struts and a leaf-sprung solid rear axle. To reduce road noise, the body mounts for the suspension (both axles) underwent several changes.

While front disc/rear drum brakes were standard equipment, four-wheel disc brakes were included on several option packages.

==== Powertrain details ====
The fourth-generation minivans underwent a minor revision of the powertrain line. Though the 2.4 L I4 returned as the standard engine (only in the United States), the Mitsubishi 6G72 V6 was dropped as the base V6 option (for the first time since 1987). Both the EG-series V6 engines returned, with the 3.3 L and 3.8 L units offered as options. During its development, the SOHC 3.5 L V6 (shared with the LH cars and the Pacifica) was under consideration as an option, but was ultimately dropped from consideration.

The 2.4 L engine was initially mated to a 3-speed TorqueFlite automatic transmission; both V6 engines were mated to a 4-speed Ultradrive automatic. After October 2001, the TorqueFlite transmission was dropped from Chrysler minivans, with all three engines mated to the 4-speed automatic for North American production. In a quiet change, the AutoStick manual gear selection system was removed from the column shifter (a a different design would be used on the RT-generation minivans).

European Chrysler Voyagers featured diesel engines, coming standard with a VM Motori 2.5 L I4 R 425 turbodiesel (5-speed manual) and a 2.8 L R 428 (4-speed automatic, introduced after 2005). Chinese production (introduced in 2007) adopted the Mitsubishi 6G72 3.0 L V6

- 2001–2007 2.4 L EDZ I4, 150 hp (110 kW) at 5400 rpm and 165 lb⋅ft (224 N⋅m) at 4000 rpm
- 2001–2007 3.3 L EGA V6, 180 hp (130 kW) at 5000 rpm and 210 lb⋅ft (280 N⋅m) at 4000 rpm
- 2001–2007 3.8 L EGH V6, 200 hp (150 kW) at 5000 rpm and 245 lb⋅ft (332 N⋅m) at 4000 rpm
- 2007–2010 3.0 L Mitsubishi 6G72 V6, 150 hp (110 kW) 176 lb⋅ft (239 N⋅m) (China)

=== Body ===
Largely intended as a refinement of the NS-platform minivans, the RS-platform vehicles initially sought to improve structural stability, reduce noise, and improve safety features over the previous generation. While breaking no new ground in terms of design, the front fascia of each model line was styled with a further degree of divisional identity (the Plymouth Voyager becoming a Chrysler at its launch). To address a criticism of the NS generation, the headlamps were more than doubled in size and made 80% brighter.

Both body lengths were configured as 5-door vehicles, with the standardization of sliding doors on both sides. In a segment first, the components for power operation of the sliding doors were integrated entirely within the door, which also reversed when encountering an object. Along with operating from a key fob, the doors were also operated from buttons on either the B-pillar or the overhead console.

While seat height itself remained unchanged from the previous generation (itself, retained from the original 1984 design), the front seats gained more accommodation for taller drivers as the seat tracks were lengthened rearward. The dashboard was completely changed in its design, with a tachometer becoming standard equipment for the first time on all versions. The center portion of the dashboard extended nearly to the floor, integrating the enlarged dashboard vents and center storage compartment. As an option, a removable center console was offered (which could be replaced between the first or second row of seats).

Dependent on model trim, the second-row seat was offered as either a bench seat or individual bucket seats. The Easy-Out Roller Seats system underwent a revision for easier use; notably, the third-row seat was reconfigured to a 50/50 split to reduce lifting weight.

==== Stow 'N Go seating ====
For the 2005 model year, Chrysler replaced its "Easy-Out" removable rear seats with the optional "Stow 'N Go" system, which folded both rear rows of seats flat into the floor. Offered only with the long-wheelbase configuration, the Stow 'N Go system was offered with a third-row bench seat and second-row bucket seats.

After engineers initially used an Erector Set to mock up the concept, Chrysler invested $400 million in a development program to bring the design to production (18 months after its approval). To integrate the new rear seating system, the entire floorpan underwent a redesign (also under the objective of making the chassis stiffer and quieter), requiring a redesign of the rear suspension, fuel tank, exhaust system, and spare tire well; the parking brake cables and rear climate control coolant lines were relocated. The seating system came with one sacrifice, as all-wheel drive was no longer able to be offered.

The third-row seat folded flat into the floor, switching to a 60/40 split; it also folded backward for "tailgate" seating. The second-row seats folded flat into the floor, independently of both the third-row seat (and each other). When the seats are deployed, their storage bays create additional underfloor storage, adding 12 cubic feet of covered storage space; with both rows folded, the interiors have a cargo volume of 160.7 cubic feet (4,550 L).

The Stow 'n Go system received the Popular Science Magazine's "Best of What's New" for 2005 award. For the subsequent RT-platform generation, Chrysler revised the system, rebranding it as "Super Stow 'N Go". New pivoting head restraints with taller seatbacks and a revised folding mechanism (marketed as "single action") improved stowage ease – with the head restraints folding on themselves automatically and the entire seat automatically folding down to a position just over its floor recess.

=== Safety ===
The 2001 model of this version earned a "Poor" rating in the Insurance Institute for Highway Safety's 40 mph offset test. It did protect its occupants reasonably well, and the dummy movement was well controlled, however, a fuel leak occurred. Chrysler corrected this problem starting with the 2002 models, moving it up to an "Acceptable" rating.

The 2006 model year brought optional side curtain airbags and a stronger B-pillar, which was tested by the Insurance Institute for Highway Safety's side impact crash test. With the side airbags, it got an "Acceptable" rating. For the driver, there is a chance of serious neck injuries, rib fractures, and/or internal organ injuries. The rear passengers, however, could leave this accident unharmed, as there is a low risk of significant injury in a crash of this severity for them.

The 4th generation Town & Country (Grand Voyager, as it is known in Europe))right hand drive (RHD) version performed very poorly in the Euro NCAP car safety tests and achieved the following ratings:

Adult Occupant:	1.5/5 stars
Child Occupant:	4/5 stars
Pedestrian:	0/4 stars

However, it was noted that "The LHD car performed significantly better than the RHD car in the frontal impact, scoring 9 points, giving a potential four star adult occupant rating." Thatcham's New Car Whiplash Ratings (NCWR) organization tested the 4th generation European Grand Voyager for its ability to protect occupants against whiplash injuries with the car achieving an 'Acceptable' rating overall.

== Marketing variations ==
The RS-platform minivan was developed before the closure of Plymouth, with several changes in both branding and exterior design reflecting the retirement of the brand after the 2000 model year. As the generation came to market for the 2001 model year, it was marketed by Chrysler and Dodge, with the Voyager nameplate continuing on through the Chrysler brand; the model line was marketed in Europe as the Chrysler Voyager.

For 2003, Chrysler reintroduced the cargo van design variant (last seen in 1995) as the Dodge (Grand) Caravan C/V. To bridge the gap between the outgoing B-series Ram Van and the Mercedes-produced Sprinter van, the C/V cargo van was assembled with deleted side windows (replaced by composite panels), a cargo floor made of plastic material similar to pickup truck bedliners and rubber cab flooring (in lieu of carpeting); the liftgate design remained carryover (with an optional rear window).

While Europe accounted for over 80% of its production, the Austrian-manufactured Chrysler Voyager/Grand Voyager was sold in over 70 countries. In contrast to North America, Chrysler held a 12% market share of the MPV segment in Europe.

=== Chrysler Town & Country ===
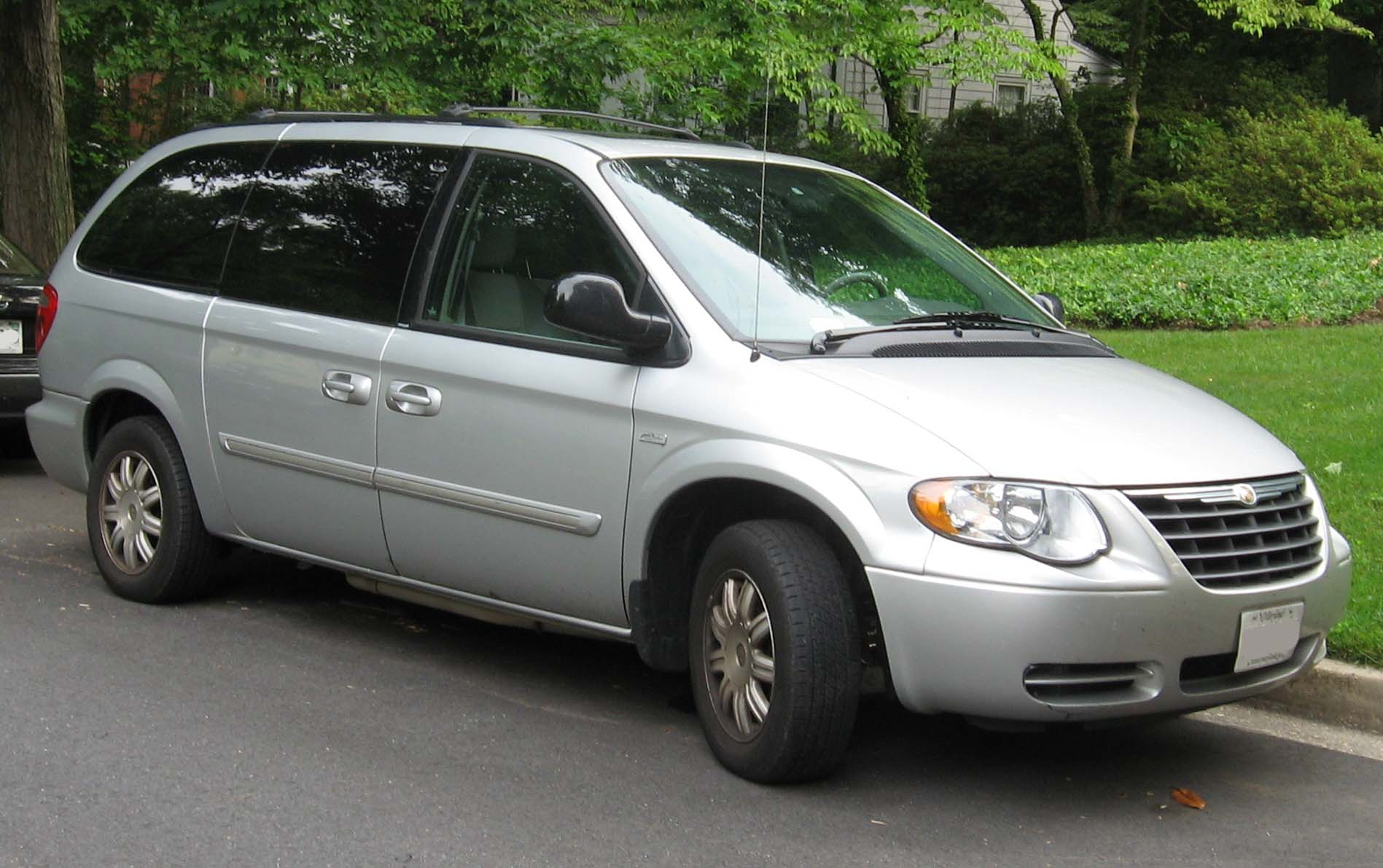
2007 Chrysler Town & Country

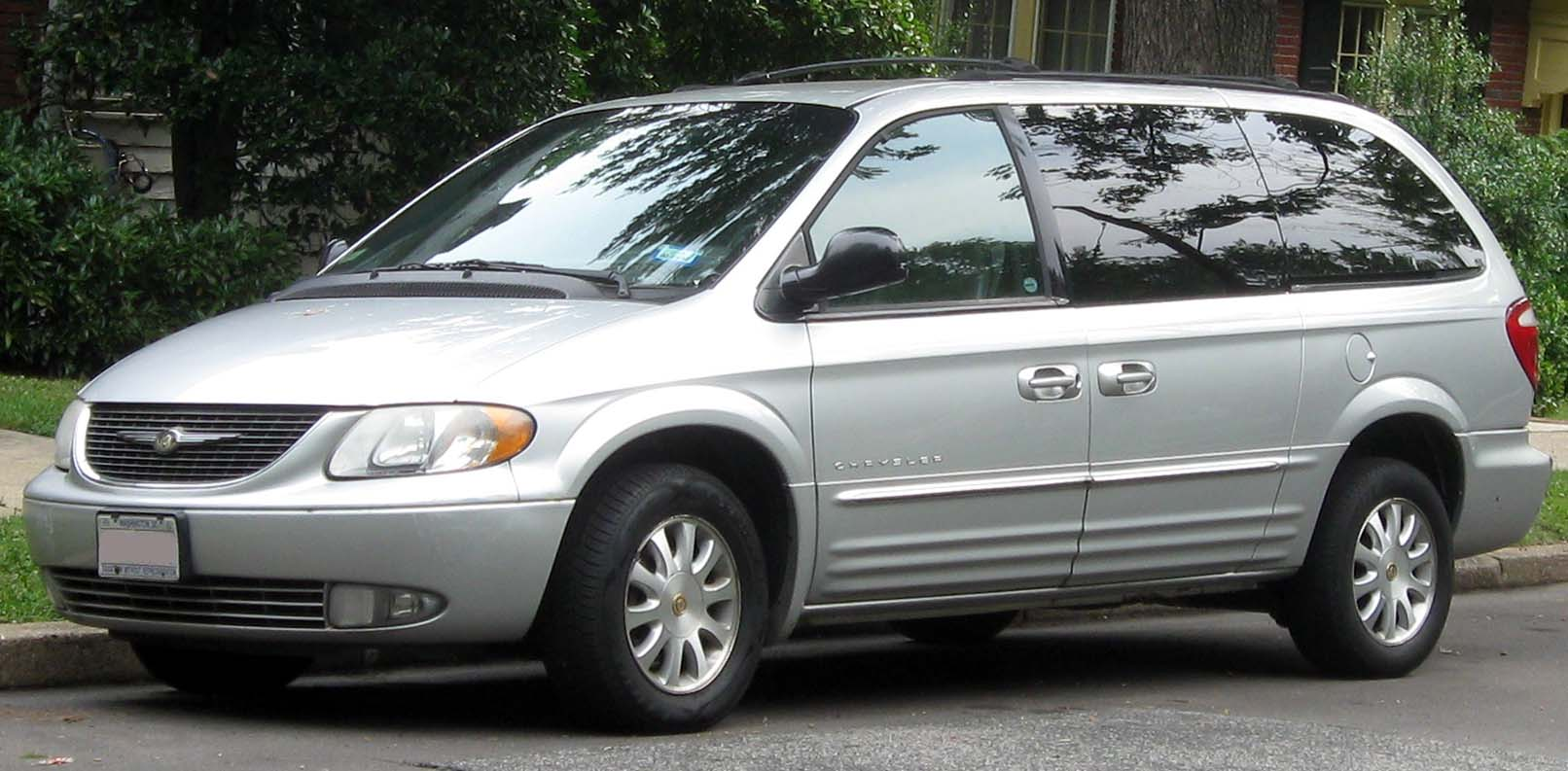
Chrysler Town & Country LXi, pre-facelift

Initially introduced as the flagship model of the Chrysler minivan range, the Town & Country took on a wider role from previous generations, with some trims serving as a Chrysler counterpart of the Dodge (Grand) Caravan. For 2001, both body lengths returned in the previous LX, LXi and Limited trims.

To accommodate for the Voyager nameplate shifting to the Chrysler line, Chrysler added entry-level eL and eX trim variants of the LX and LXi for 2002 (dropping them after 2003). For 2004, the entry-level trims were dropped, and the Chrysler Voyager was renamed as an unnamed base trim (offered only with the short-wheelbase body). The LX was dropped from retail sale, with the LXi becoming the Touring for 2005.

For its 2005 mid-cycle revision, the Town & Country added a large rectangular eggcrate grille, borrowing design elements of the PT Cruiser; the update also included larger headlamps. Along with the base-trim short-wheelbase version (the previous Voyager), it was offered as the LX (sold largely for fleet sale), the Touring (the previous LXi), and the Limited. A driver's side knee airbag was now standard on all models. The front seat-mounted side airbags of previous years were discontinued in favor of side-curtain airbags for all three rows. These were standard on Limited trim and optional on all other models, however could not be ordered with the moonroof option.

=== Chrysler Voyager (North America) ===
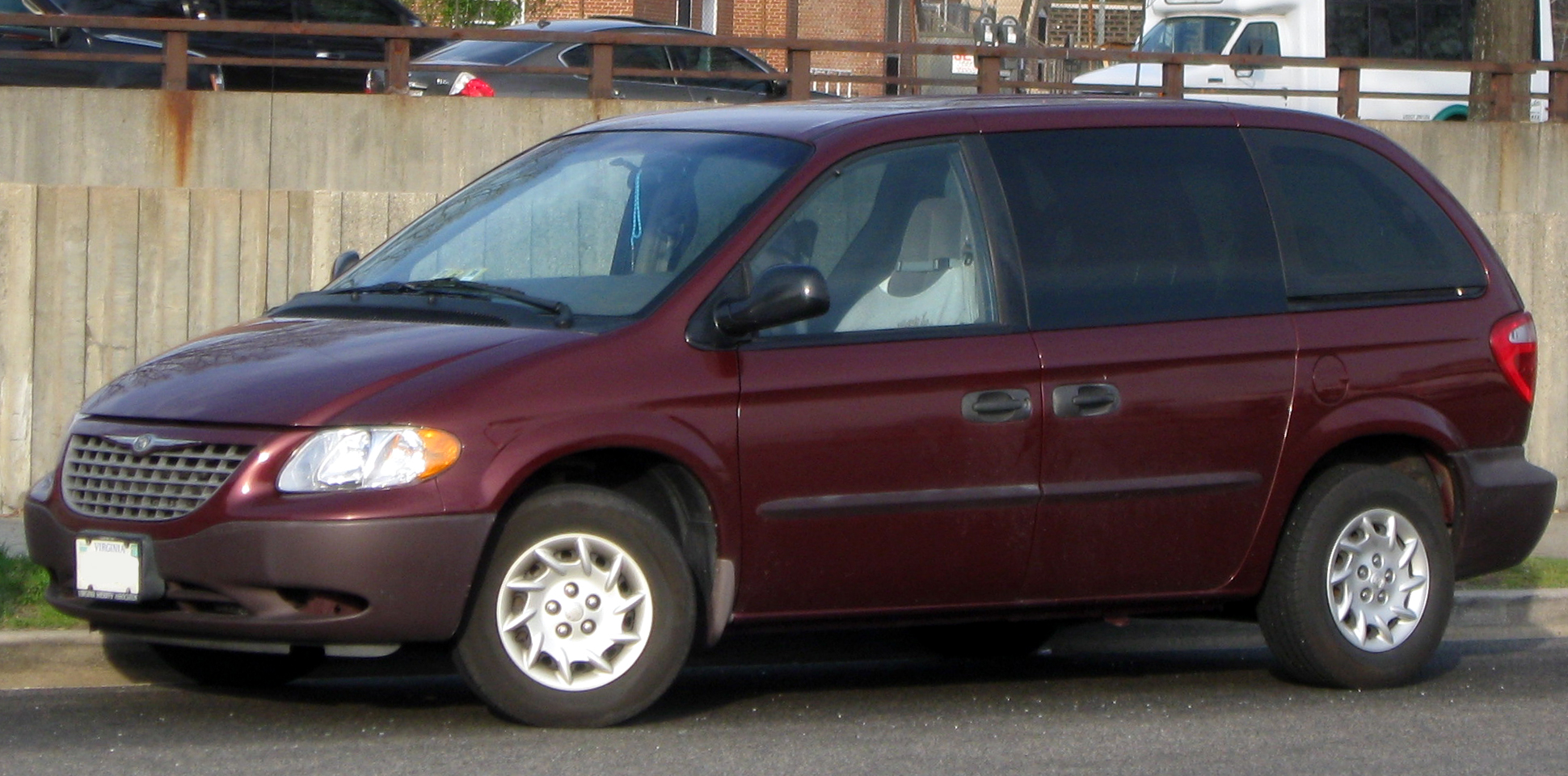
2002 Chrysler Voyager, U.S. market

After having been sold as both a Plymouth and a Chrysler for 2000, the Voyager became a Chrysler in North America for 2001. Offered only with the short-wheelbase body (the Grand Voyager was discontinued in North America), the Chrysler Voyager differed visually from the Town & Country by its eggcrate grille, featuring a high-mounted Chrysler wing emblem (similar to the PT Cruiser). Initially offered in base and LX trims, an entry-level eC trim was added for 2002.

After 2003, Chrysler dropped the RS-generation Voyager, not using the nameplate again in North America until 2020. For 2004, the vehicle itself returned as an unnamed base model of the Town & Country (the only version offered with the short-wheelbase body); it continued for sale through 2007.

=== Chrysler Voyager (export) ===
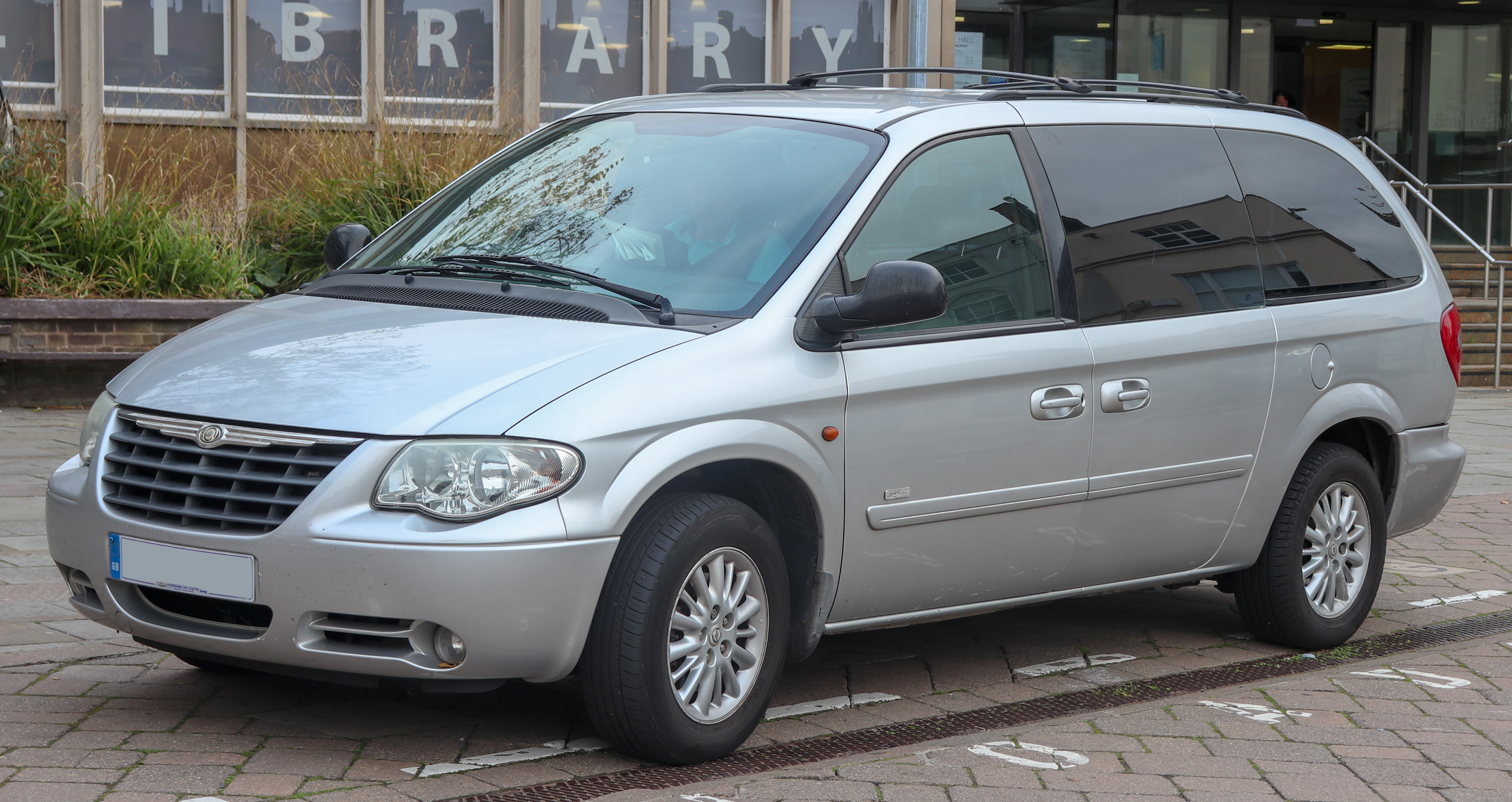
2007 Chrysler Grand Voyager Signature 2.8 CRD

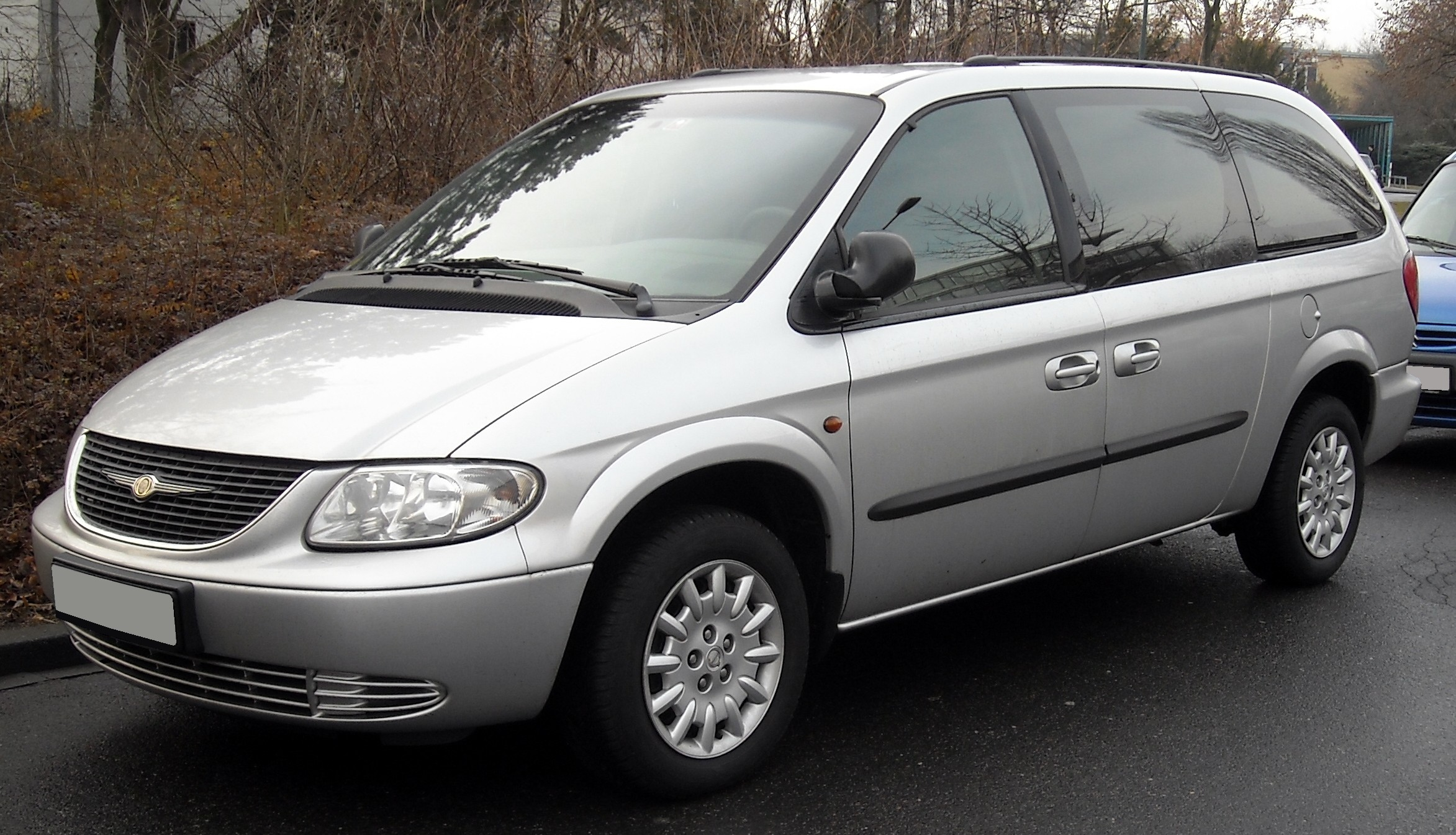
European market Chrysler Voyager (pre-facelift)

The export-market Chrysler Voyager differs significantly from its American namesake, sharing its much of its body design with the Chrysler Town & Country. One of the largest vehicles in the European MPV segment (sized between the Renault Espace and the Volkswagen Transporter), the Voyager served as the counterpart of both the Dodge Caravan and the Chrysler Town & Country. The model line was offered as both with a standard-wheelbase body and as a long-wheelbase Grand Voyager (not sold in North America).

Manufactured in Graz, Austria (with Chrysler internally designating it as the RG platform), the Chrysler Voyager also differed mechanically from the Town & Country. The 2.4 L gasoline I4 was standard; an optional 2.5 L turbodiesel I4 was also offered with a 5-speed manual. A 2.8 L turbodiesel was offered only with a 4-speed automatic transmission; prior to 2007, a 3.3 L V6 was available in Europe.

The RG-platform Voyager shared its trim nomenclature from its American counterparts as part of its own model hierarchy. SE was the base trim for the Voyager while LX was for the Grand Voyager, followed by Signature, Executive, and Executive XS (replacing Limited XS). With the exception of changes made to accommodate the 5-speed manual transmission, the interior shared commonality with its American counterpart, including the Stow 'N Go model update.

This is the final generation of Chrysler minivans that were manufactured in Austria. For 2012 production, the RT-generation minivans in Continental Europe were rebranded under the Lancia Voyager name (before their discontinuation altogether).

=== Dodge Caravan ===
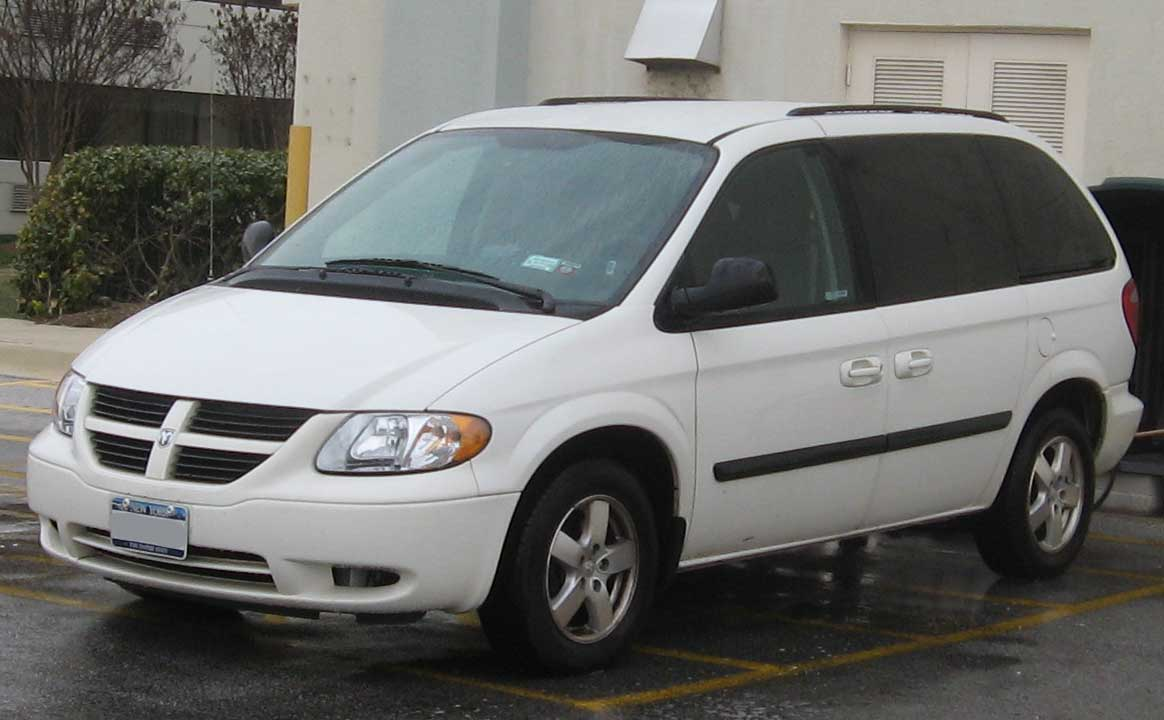
2007 Dodge Caravan SXT (post-facelift)

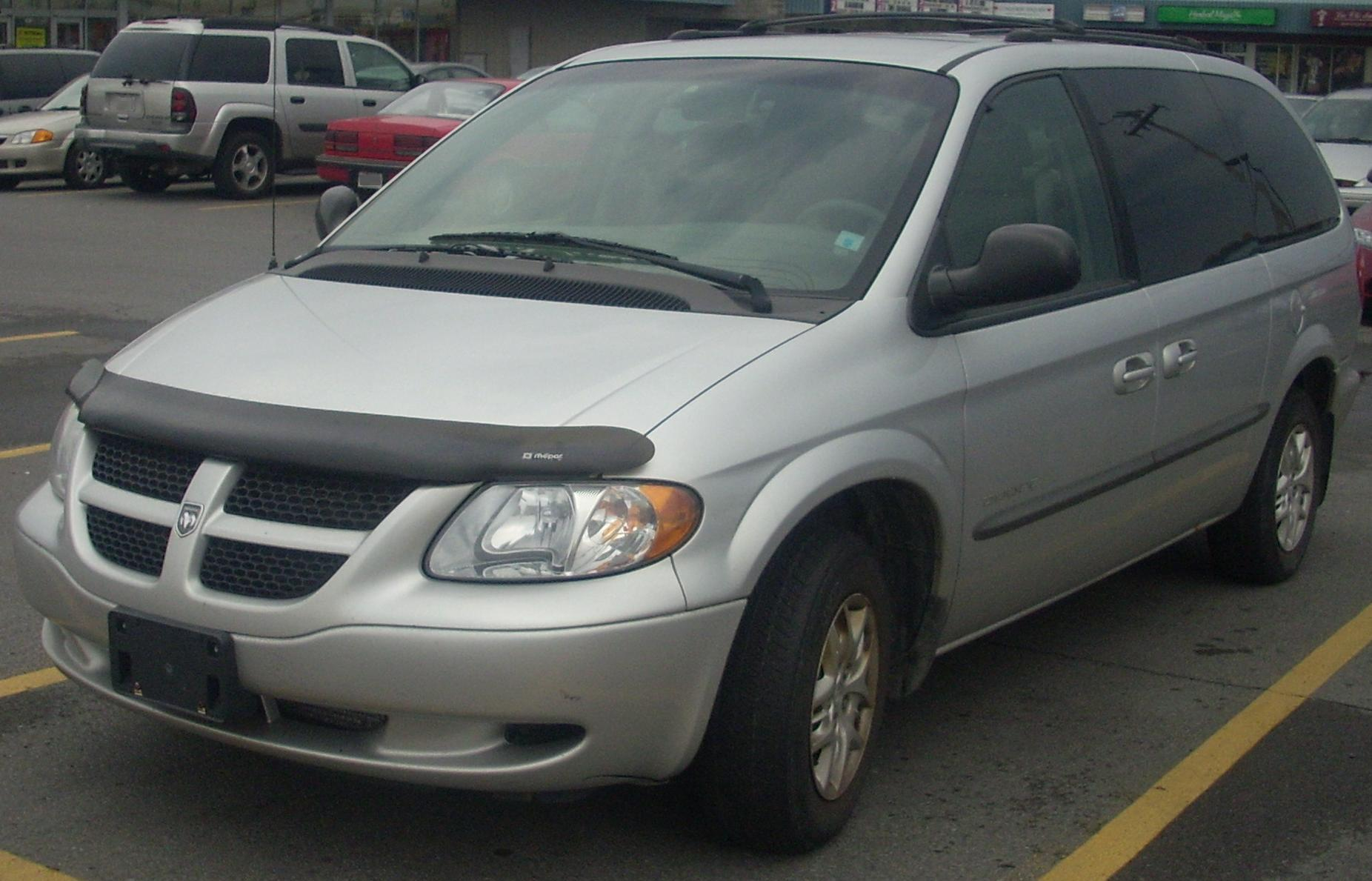
2001 Dodge Grand Caravan SE

Following the discontinuation of the Plymouth brand, Chrysler continued to market the Dodge Caravan as its mid-trim minivan offering, slotting between the Chrysler Voyager and the Chrysler Town & Country. As the former was discontinued after 2003, the role of the Dodge Caravan became dependent on trim, with some versions serving as entry-level vehicles and others (primarily Grand Caravans) serving as Dodge counterparts to mid-trim Chrysler Town & Country vehicles.

For its debut, the RS-generation Caravan underwent a slight revision of its trim lines, with SE (SWB only), Sport, and ES trims returning (dropping the base and LE trims used since 1984). For 2002, the Grand Caravan SE was added, along with the entry-level eC and eL trims (dropped after 2003). For 2003, the flagship SXT trim was introduced, ultimately replacing both the Sport and ES trims for 2004.

For 2004, the Dodge Caravan became the first Chrysler minivan to mark 20 years of production, with Chrysler offering a commemorative "Anniversary Edition" option package for the SXT trim.

The 2005 exterior revision of the model line saw the front fascia adopt a slightly more squared-off appearance, adopting design elements similar to the Dodge Magnum station wagon.

=== Other nameplates ===
In Brazil, the RS-generation minivans are known as the Chrysler Caravan and Chrysler Grand Caravan.

In the Netherlands, the Ram Van (under the Dodge and Chrysler brands) name is used for RS-generation cargo vans.

== Licensed production ==
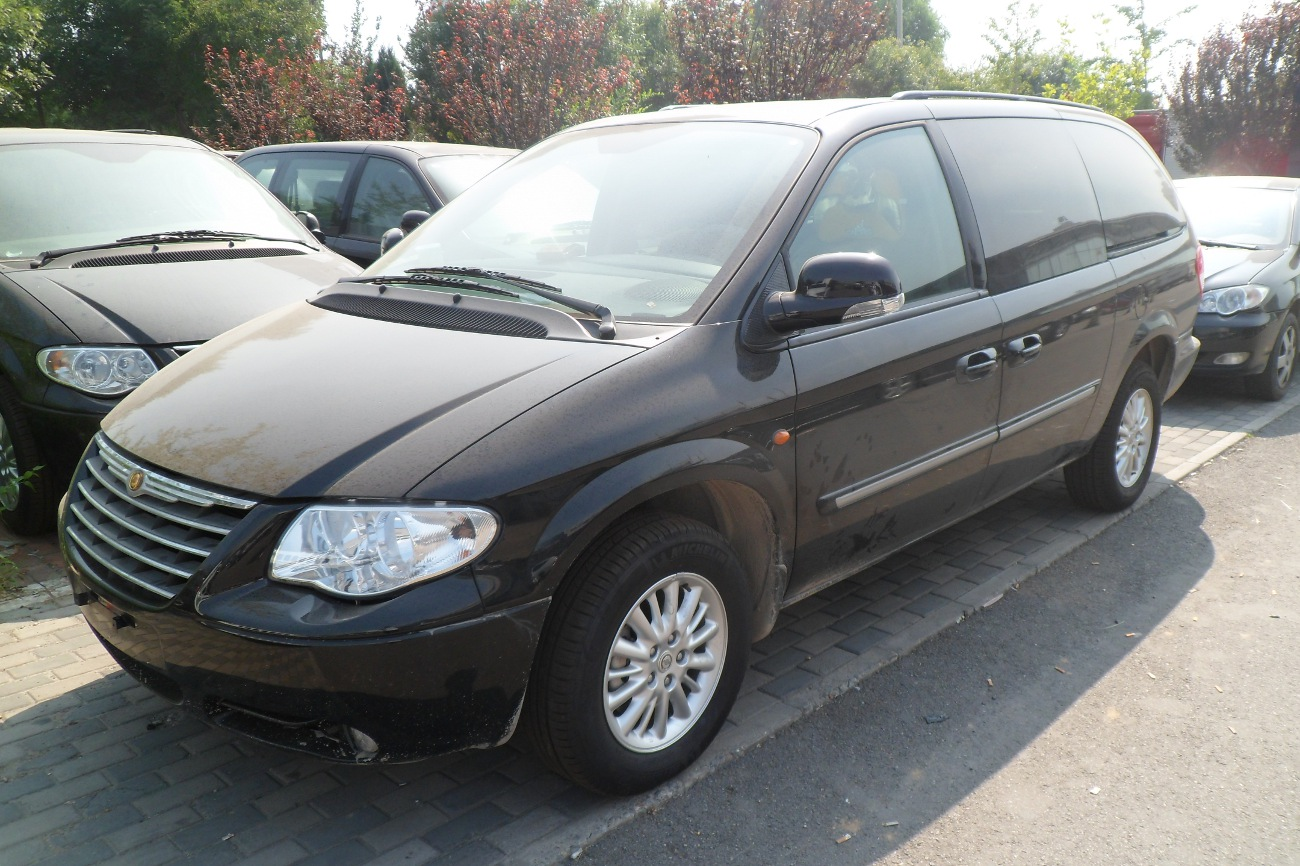
Chrysler Grand Voyager (China)

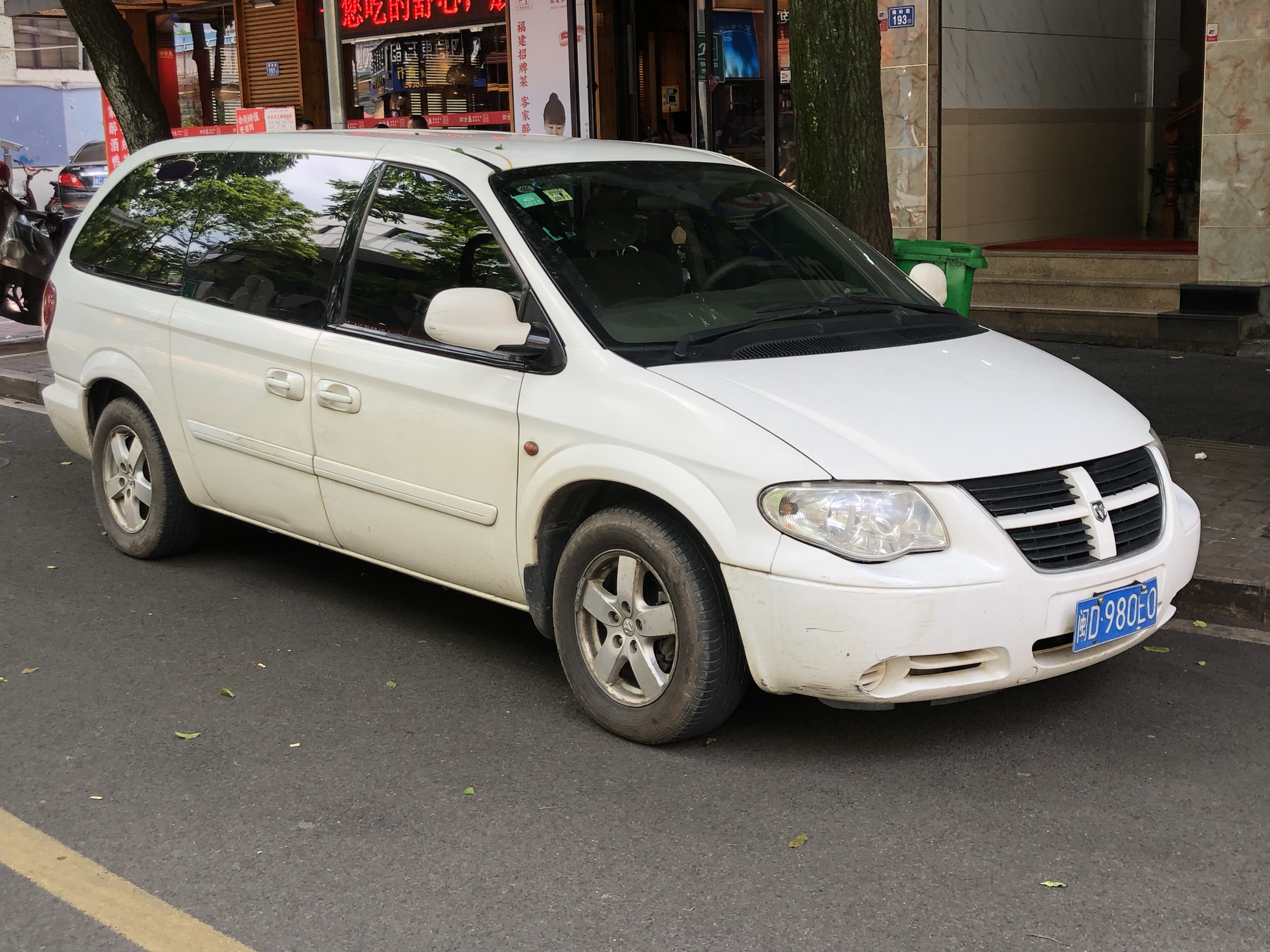
Dodge Grand Caravan (China)

Taiwanese-market Town & Country minivans were assembled between 2005 and 2007 in Yangmei, Taiwan under license by the China Motor Corporation, starting with the 2006 model year. They were based on the RG variant Grand Voyager for global market. Taiwanese models featured minor variations for the local market including LED taillights, backup cameras and mirror-mounted turn signals. Coinciding with its relationship to Mitsubishi, the manufacturer again fitted the 3.0 L Mitsubishi 6G72 V6 to the model line (for the first time since 2000).

In 2007, production ended and the production line was relocated to China where Soueast (a three-way joint venture between CMC, Mitsubishi Motors and the Fujian Motors Group) assembled the Chrysler Grand Voyager and Dodge Grand Caravan from 2007 until late 2010. The Grand Voyager was largely identical to the Taiwan-market Town & Country, fitted with turn signals on the fenders and the side mirrors. The Grand Caravan was fitted with its own grille, incandescent taillamps (rather than LED units), but shared its wheels with the SXT trim of its American namesake.

The RS-generation Voyager and Caravan were discontinued after 2010; the Grand Voyager moved on to the RT-generation design, while the Grand Caravan was replaced by the Dodge JCUV (Dodge Journey), which entered local production in 2009.
