= Ryan Nagode =

- Born: East Aurora, NY
- Occupation: Automobile Designer
- Known for: Chief Designer, RAM Interior Studio at Stellantis

Ryan Christopher Nagode is an automotive designer and chief interior designer at Stellantis. In 2014, he was named to the Automotive News "40 under 40."

A graduate of the Cleveland Institute of Art Industrial Design Program in 2003, Nagode designed the exterior of the Dodge Avenger; the Dodge Journey; the interior of the 2009 Dodge Ram and 2011 Jeep Wrangler; and directed the design studio for the 2013 RAM 1500/2500/3500 interiors, including the Laramie Longhorn and Limited models, as well as the 2013 Dodge Dart and the return of the 2013 SRT Viper.

In a 2007 interview, Nagode said the front end of the Avenger was inspired by a favourite pair of designer Oakley sunglasses and the feeling they give him when he wore them.

== Background ==
Nagode is the son of Larry and Denise Nagode, grew up in East Aurora, NY and graduated in 1998 from East Aurora High School. Nagode's father was also a graduate of the Cleveland Institute of Art in 1974, and was a student of Viktor Schreckengost and is Senior Designer at Fisher-Price — where Ryan Nagode had also served a summer internship.

Nagode participated in the CIA's 5th annual Automotive Design Symposium, March 2, 2007 at the Cleveland Auto Show as well as the Cleveland Institute of Art's Future center for design and technology transfer, Design Values 2, June 1 through August 3, 2007.

== Gallery ==
The second generation Dodge Avenger, 2009 Dodge Journey, as well as the 2009 Dodge Ram Interior, styled by Ryan Nagode:

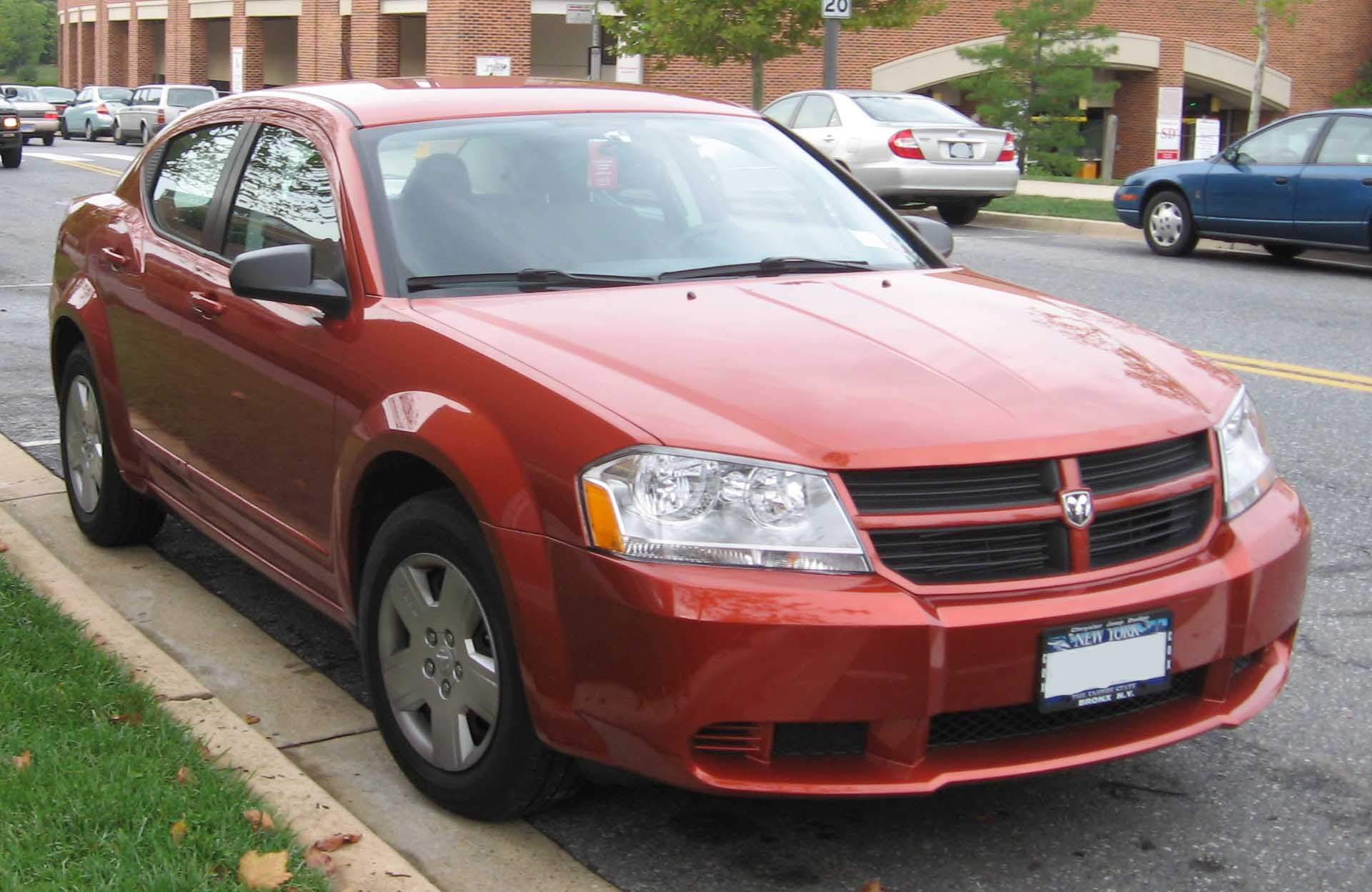

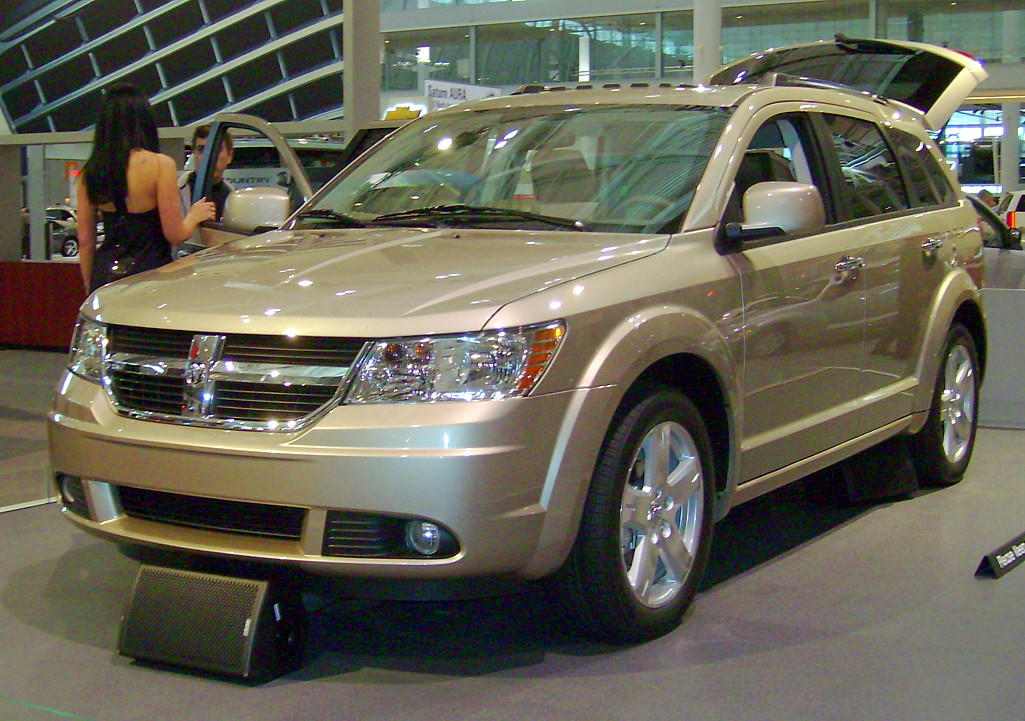
