= Dodge Journey =

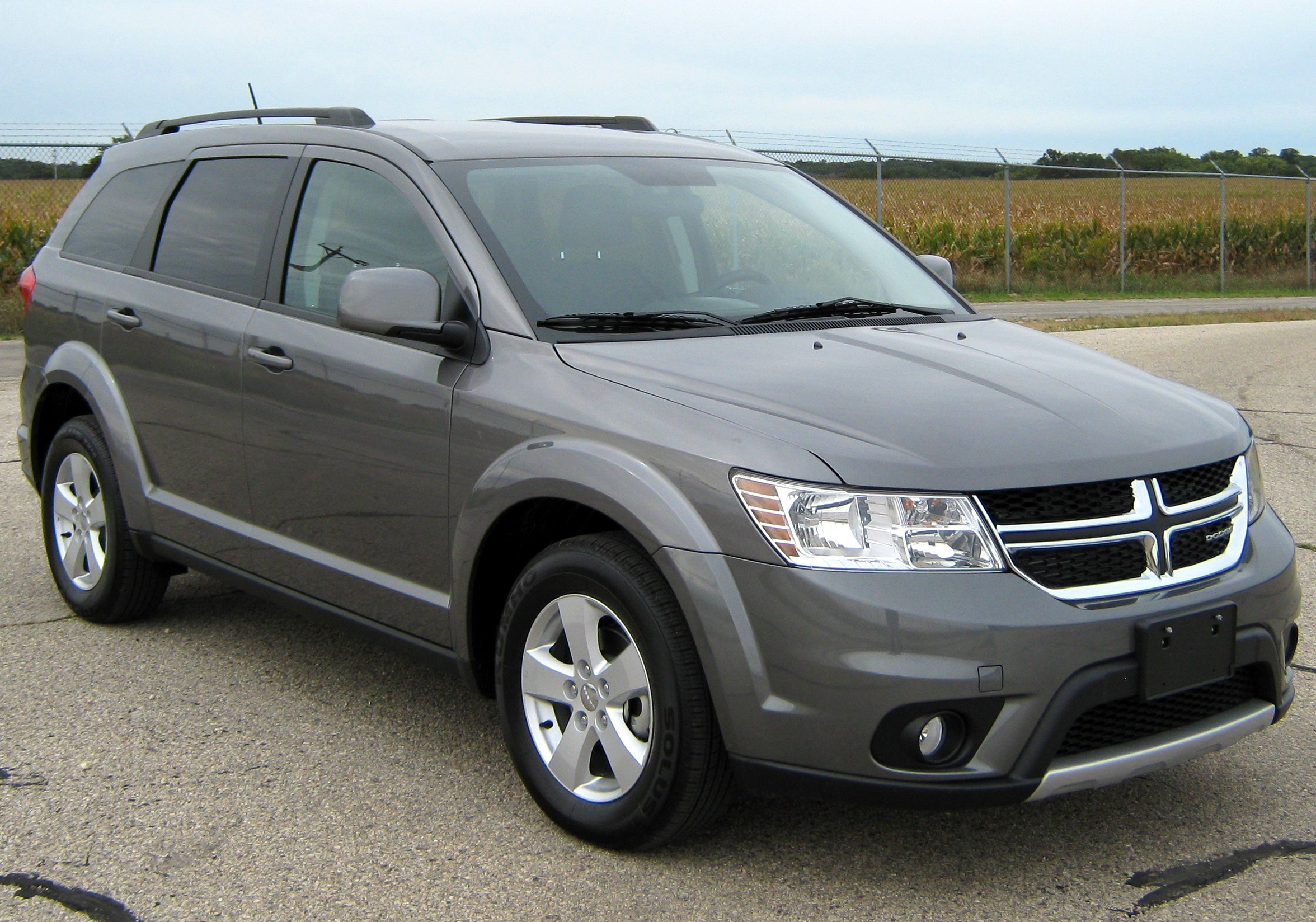
- 2012 Dodge Journey

Overview
- Manufacturer: Dodge (Note: Chrysler LLC (2008–2009); Chrysler Group LLC (2009–2014); FCA US LLC (2014–2020))
- Also called: Fiat Freemont; Dodge JC (Japan); Dodge JCUV (China)
- Production: 2008–2020
- Model years: 2009–2020; 2011–2015 (Freemont)
- Assembly: Mexico: Toluca (TCA)
- Designer: Ryan Nagode

Body and chassis
- Class: Mid-size crossover SUV
- Body style: 5-door SUV
- Layout: Front-engine, front-wheel drive or four-wheel drive
- Platform: Chrysler JC platform
- Related: Chrysler 200; Chrysler Sebring; Citroën C-Crosser; Citroën C4 Aircross; Dodge Avenger; Dodge Caliber; Jeep Patriot; Jeep Compass; Mitsubishi ASX; Mitsubishi Delica; Mitsubishi Eclipse Cross; Mitsubishi Lancer (ninth generation Mitsubishi Lancer Evolution X Mitsubishi Outlander; Peugeot 4007; Peugeot 4008

Powertrain
- Engine: Gasoline: 2.4 L World I4; 2.7 L LH V6; 3.5 L EGF V6; 3.6 L Pentastar V6; Diesel: 2.0 L EA188 CRD PD I4; 2.0 L MultiJet II I4
- Transmission: 4-speed Ultradrive 40TES automatic 5-speed Magna T355 manual 6-speed Aisin BG6 manual 6-speed Fiat C635 manual 6-speed Getrag Mps6 DCT automatic 6-speed Ultradrive 62TE automatic

Dimensions
- Wheelbase: 113.8 in (2,890 mm)
- Length: 192.4 in (4,887 mm)
- Width: 72.2 in (1,834 mm)
- Height: 66.6 in (1,692 mm); R/T: 69.5 in (1,765 mm)
- Curb weight: 3,818 lb (1,732 kg)

Chronology
- Predecessor: For Fiat Freemont: Fiat Ulysse; Fiat Croma
- Successor: Dodge Journey (second generation) (Mexico)

The Dodge Journey is a mid-size crossover SUV manufactured and marketed by Fiat Chrysler Automobiles' Dodge brand for model years 2009 to 2020 over a single generation, with a facelift for the 2011 model year. The Journey was styled by Ryan Nagode, and was marketed globally (except the Middle East) in both left- and right-hand drive, including as the Fiat Freemont.

Internally identified as the JC49, the Journey shares FCA's global D-segment platform with the Dodge Avenger and a nearly identical wheelbase to the outgoing short-wheelbase (SWB) Dodge Caravan.

Having debuted at the 2007 Frankfurt Motor Show, the Journey subsequently appeared at the 2009 Frankfurt Motor Show. All models were manufactured in Mexico at FCA's Toluca Assembly facility, with just over 1.1 million manufactured before production ended in 2020.

== Design and equipment ==
As a mid-size CUV, the Journey was available in five and seven passenger configurations and was noted for its overall packaging and seating flexibility—which included a front passenger seat with under-cushion storage and fold-flat capability; second-row for-aft sliding, reclining, fold-flat seating with an H-point 1.6 inches (40 mm) higher than the front row (aka theater seating); latching under-floor storage with removable bins; available twin booster seats and single-hand-operable third row access; available twin fold-flat third-row seats and an aft under-floor storage compartment. Trim levels varied over model years, to include various options with entertainment/infotainment, cloth or heated leather seats and heated steering wheel as well. Additionally, rear doors opened to 90 degrees, rare for any offerings by the Big Three (automobile manufacturers).

Production versions of 2009 model year vehicles went on sale in early 2008 for the 2009 model-year in North America, and mid-2008 elsewhere. A version for the Chinese market debuted at Auto China in 2008, marketed as the JCUV. Initial model production began in 2009. The Freemont went on sale in Russia in 2013. The Journey was marketed in both LHD and RHD depending on the market.

From 2009 to 2010, the trim levels in North America were the SE (powered by a 2.4L I4), the SXT, and the R/T (both powered by a 3.5L V6). The SXT and R/T were available with all-wheel drive (AWD).

=== 2011 update ===
Revisions for the 2011 model-year include modifications to the grille, lower front fascia, redesigned interior, suspension, steering, powertrain, and use of Dodge's new logo, launched in 2011, as well as LED taillights (not available on base trims). Express and Mainstreet trim levels replace SE and SXT respectively, while Crew and Lux trims are also added to the lineup. The 2011 Journey received new Uconnect 3 infotainment systems with either 4.3-inch (4.3") or 8.4-inch (8.4") LCD color touchscreen displays, and a full-color LCD Electronic Vehicle Information Center (EVIC) in the instrument cluster. The Keyless Enter-'n'-Go System, with keyless access and push-button start, became standard on all Journey models.

For the 2012 model year, the Journey became Dodge's smallest SUV after FCA stopped manufacturing the Nitro. SE and SXT trims returned for 2012, replacing Express and Mainstreet trims, respectively. An American Value Package (AVP) model is also added for the United States market that is priced below the SE. For the 2013 model year, Dodge released a "Blacktop" trim option, with 19-inch aluminium wheels and center caps, grille, bezel headlamps, lower front fascia accent, and exterior mirrors, all in a gloss black color. In 2014, the Journey Crossroad was introduced with chrome accents along the lower part of the body and in the interior, smoked head and taillights, a black grille, rocker panels, rails for a roof rack, and a skid plate simile at the rear. Chrysler added the revised Dodge logo with two slanted rectangles for the 2013 model year. For the 2016 model year, the Journey's AVP and Limited trims were discontinued and the Crossroad Plus trim was added. For the 2017 model year; the R/T trim was replaced by the GT trim.

Pre-facelift styling

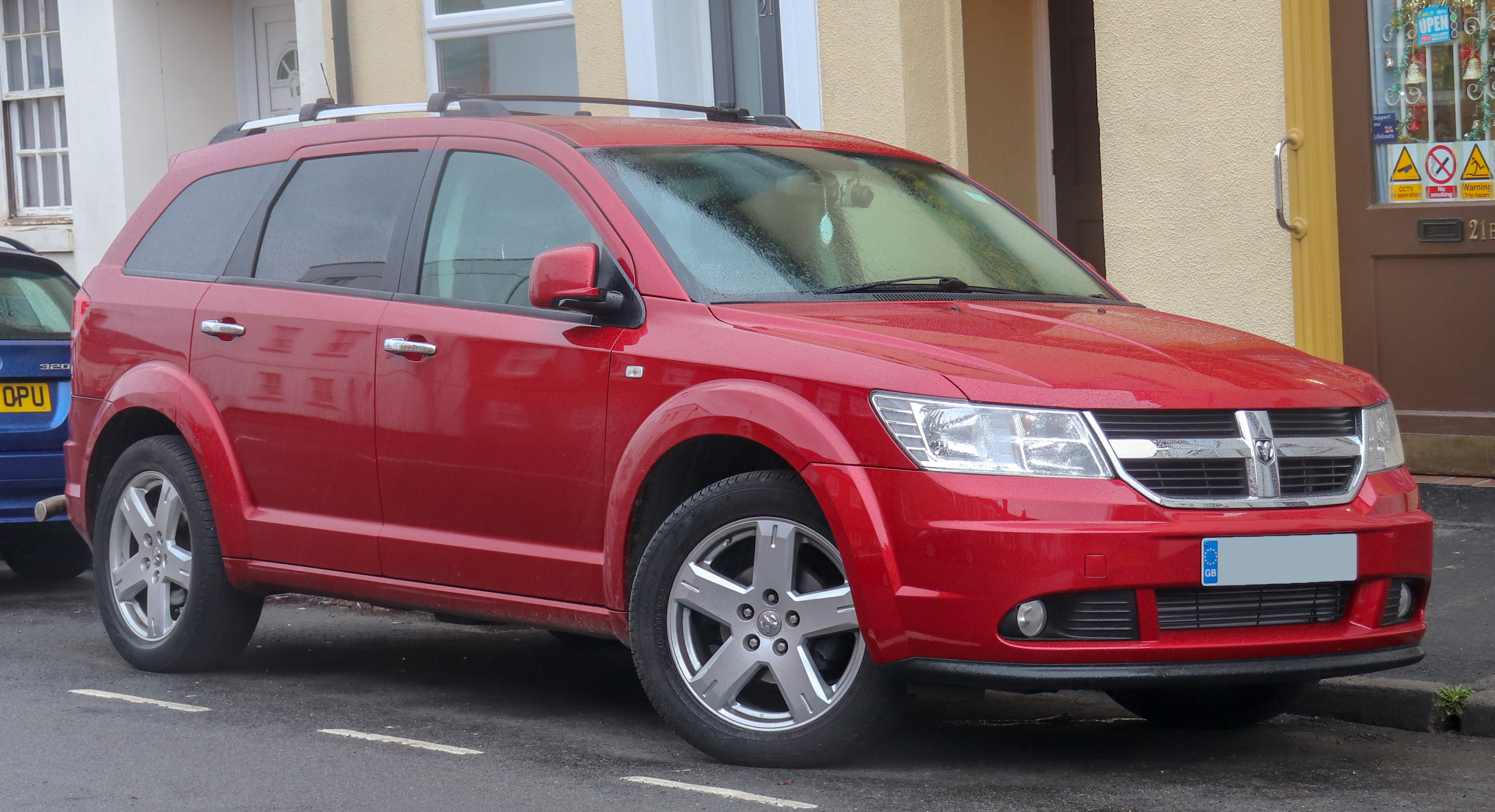
Front

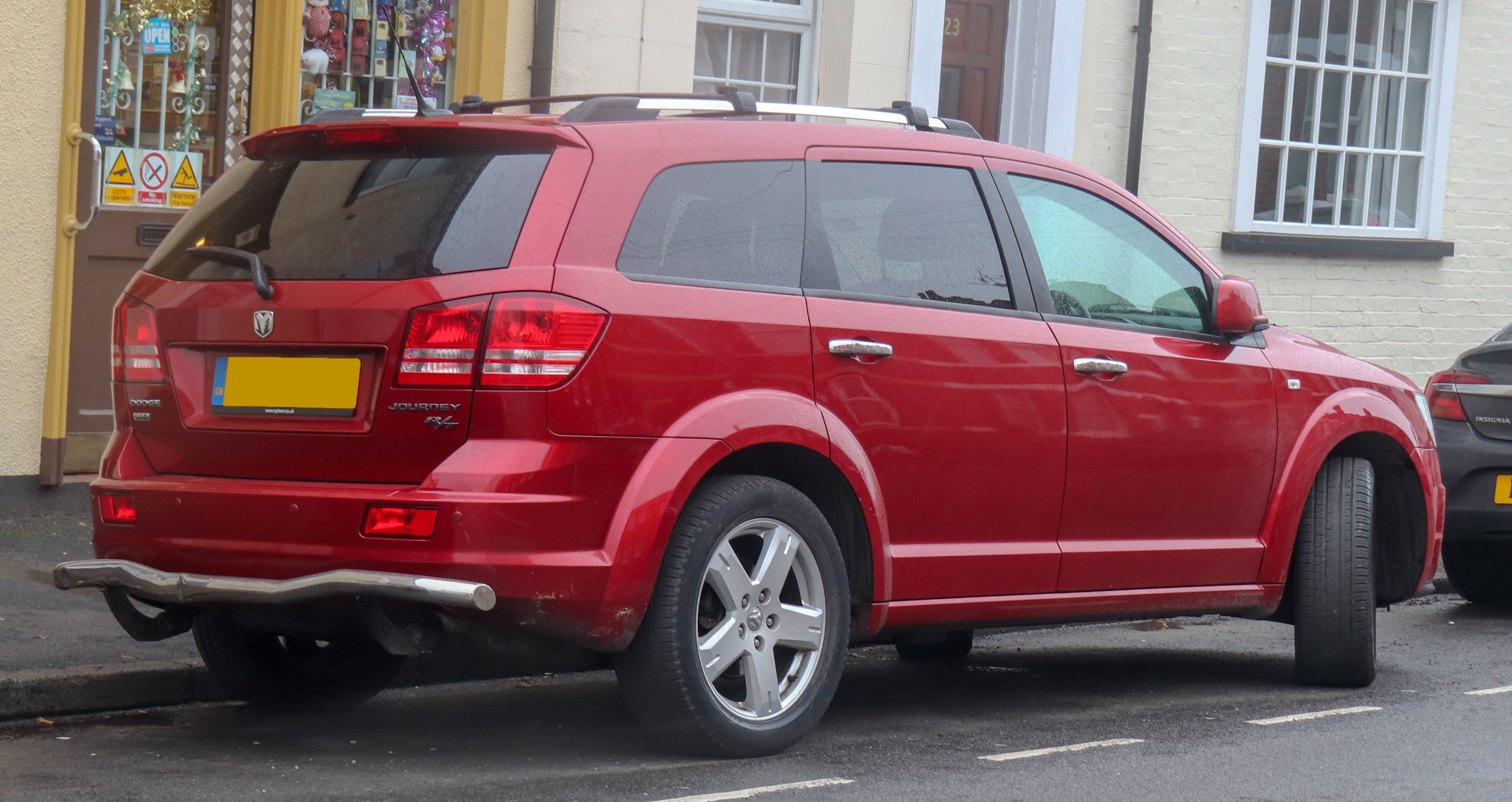
Rear

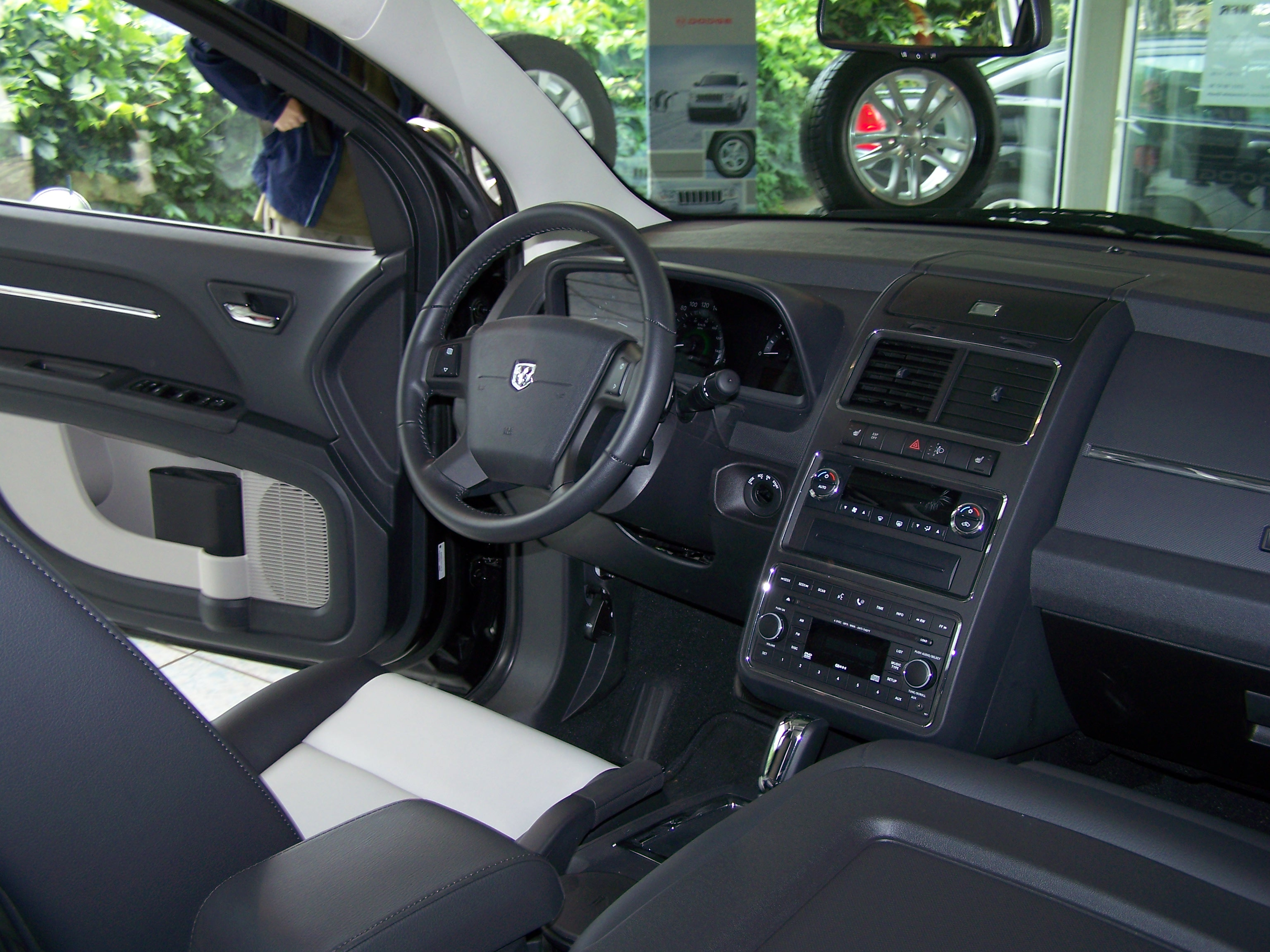
Interior

Post-facelift styling

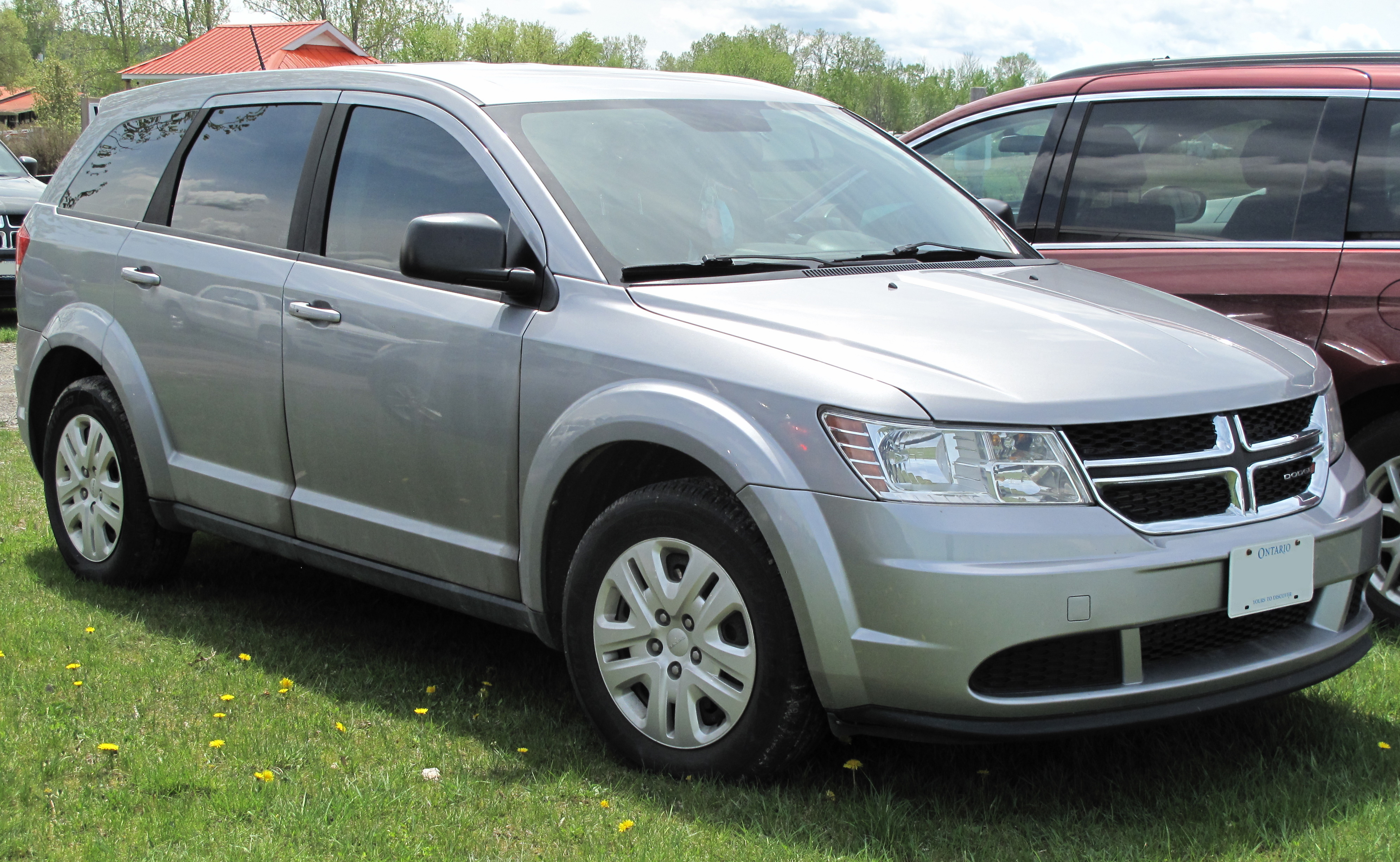
Front

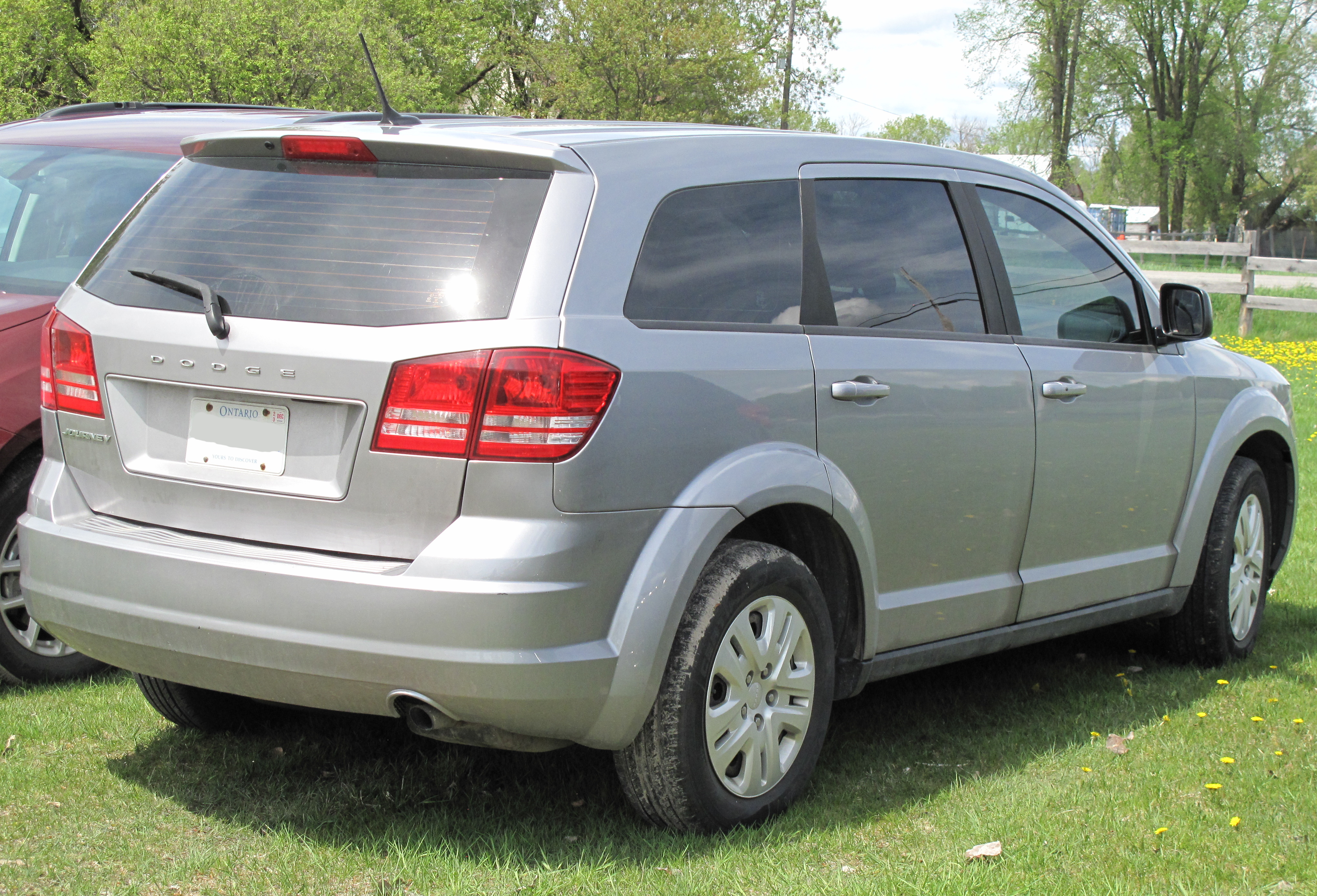
Rear

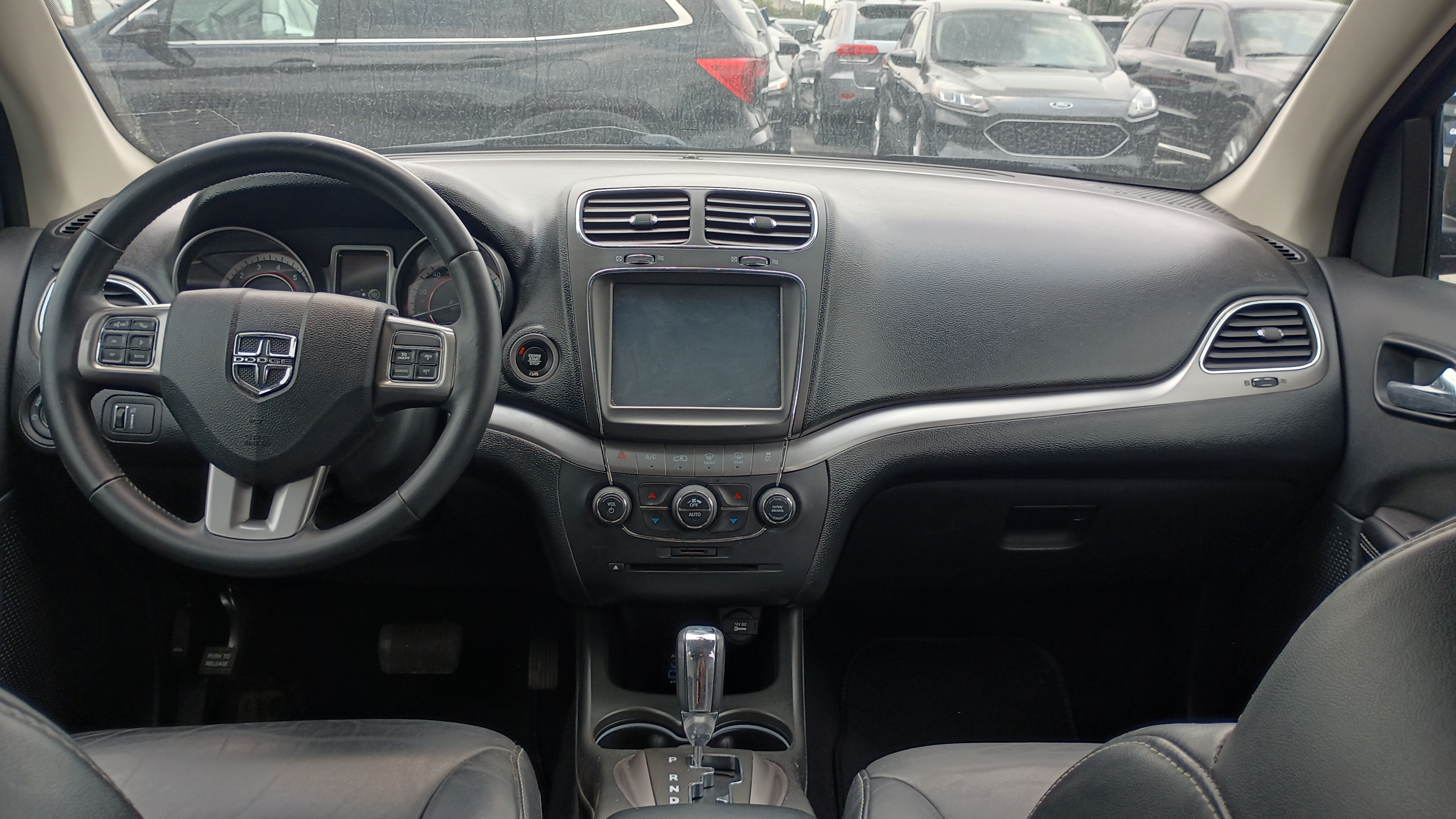
Interior

=== 2020 model year changes ===
For the 2020 model year, the Dodge Journey was available in two trim levels: base SE Value and "up-level" Crossroad. All 2020 Journey models were powered by a 2.4-liter inline-four gasoline engine producing 173 horsepower and 166 lb-ft of torque, with a four-speed automatic transmission, and available with front wheel drive. The optional 3.6-liter Pentastar Variable Valve Timing (VVT) V6 gasoline engine, six-speed automatic transmission, and the option for all-wheel drive were discontinued. Journey models featured standard three-row, seven-passenger seating, which was previously optional on base trim levels. Available options and packages have been revised. In addition, the Journey (as well as the Dodge Grand Caravan) were not available in states with California emissions requirements for the 2020 model year. 2020 was the final model year for the Journey, with Dodge citing the decision to transition to a performance brand.

=== Second generation ===
Although the Journey was discontinued in the United States after the 2020 model year, a second-generation Journey, a rebadged GAC GS5, was sold in Mexico starting in 2022. The model is unrelated to the original JC49 Journey and is not sold in the U.S. or Canada.

== Fiat Freemont ==
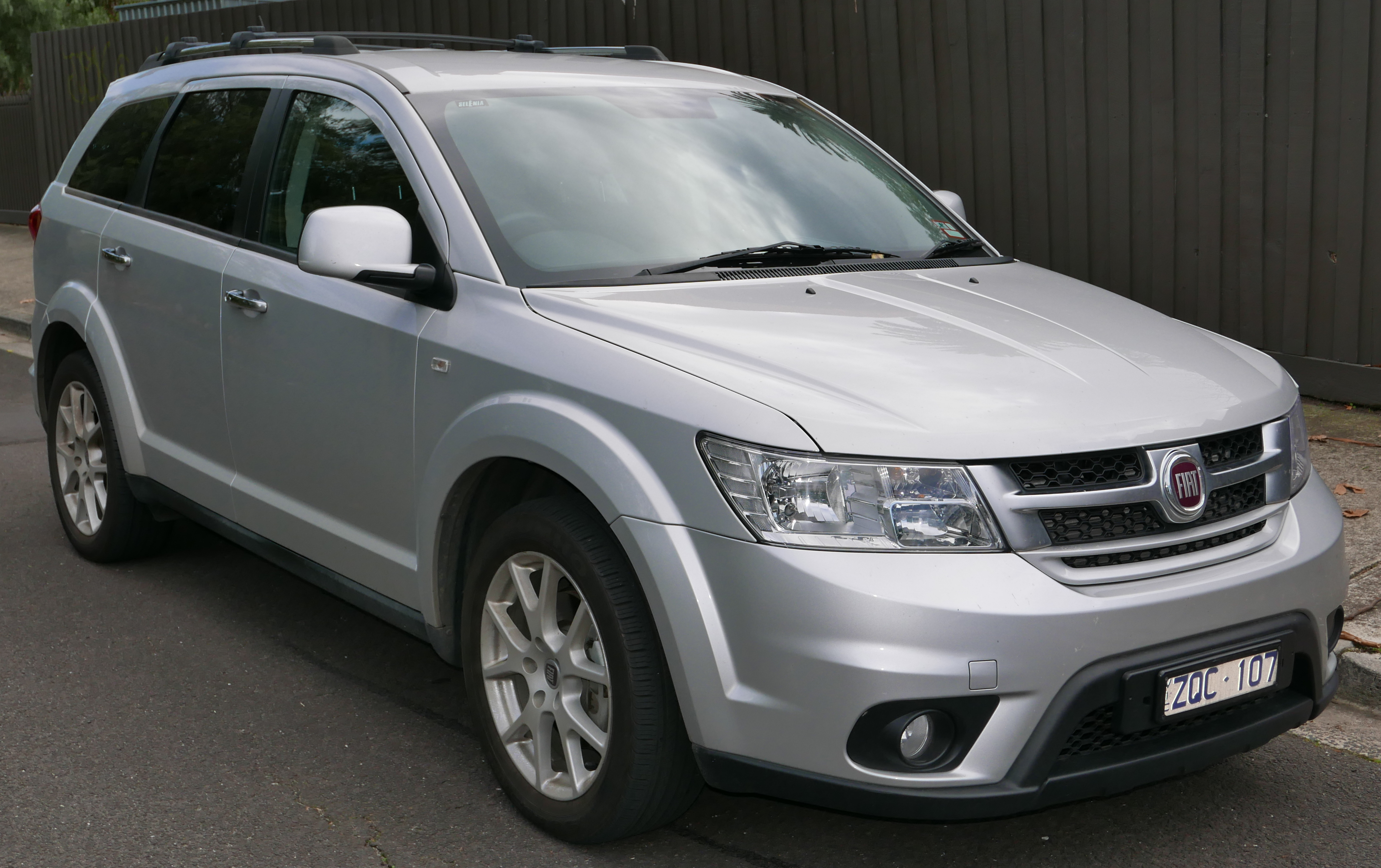

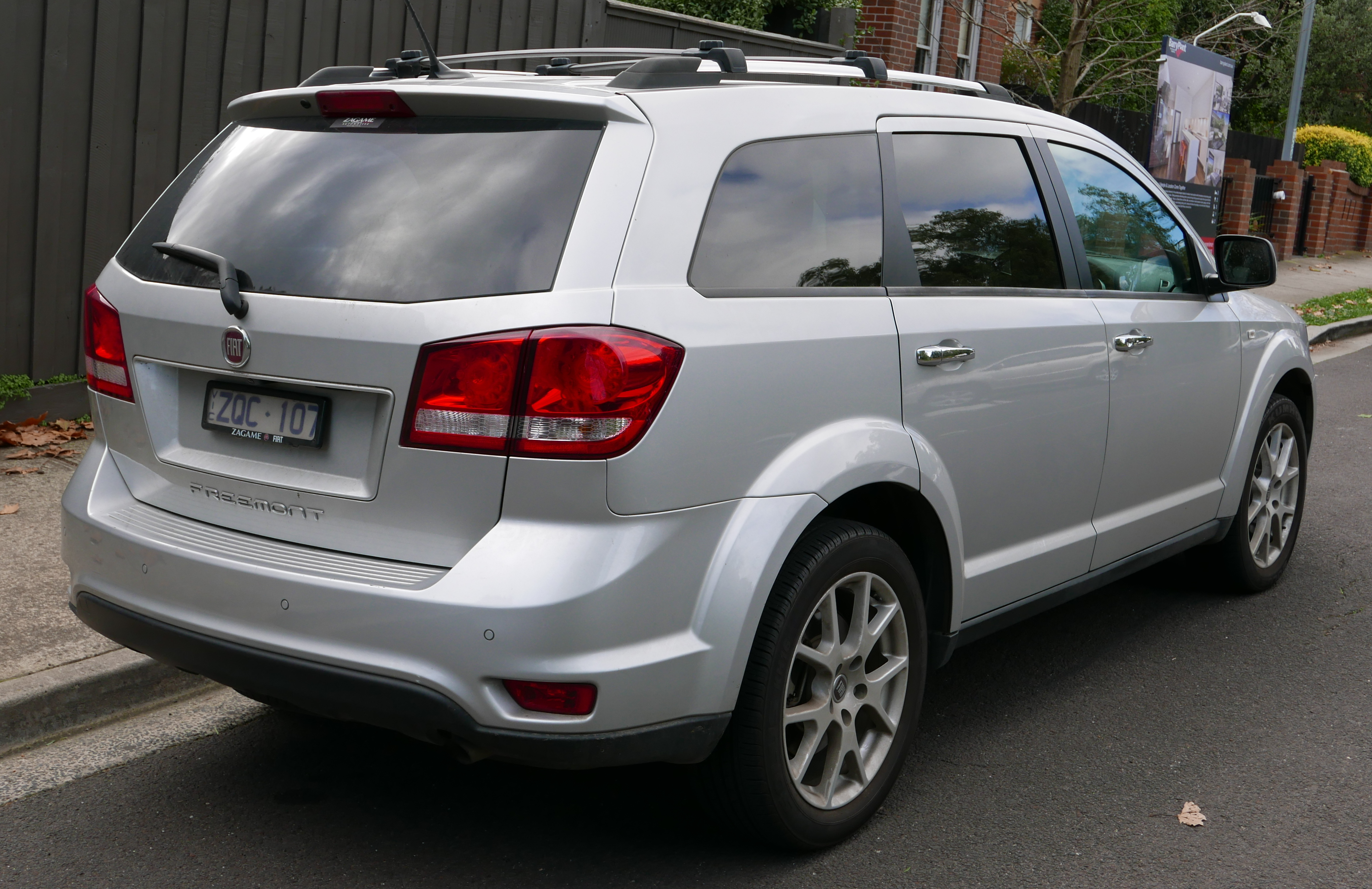
Freemont wagon

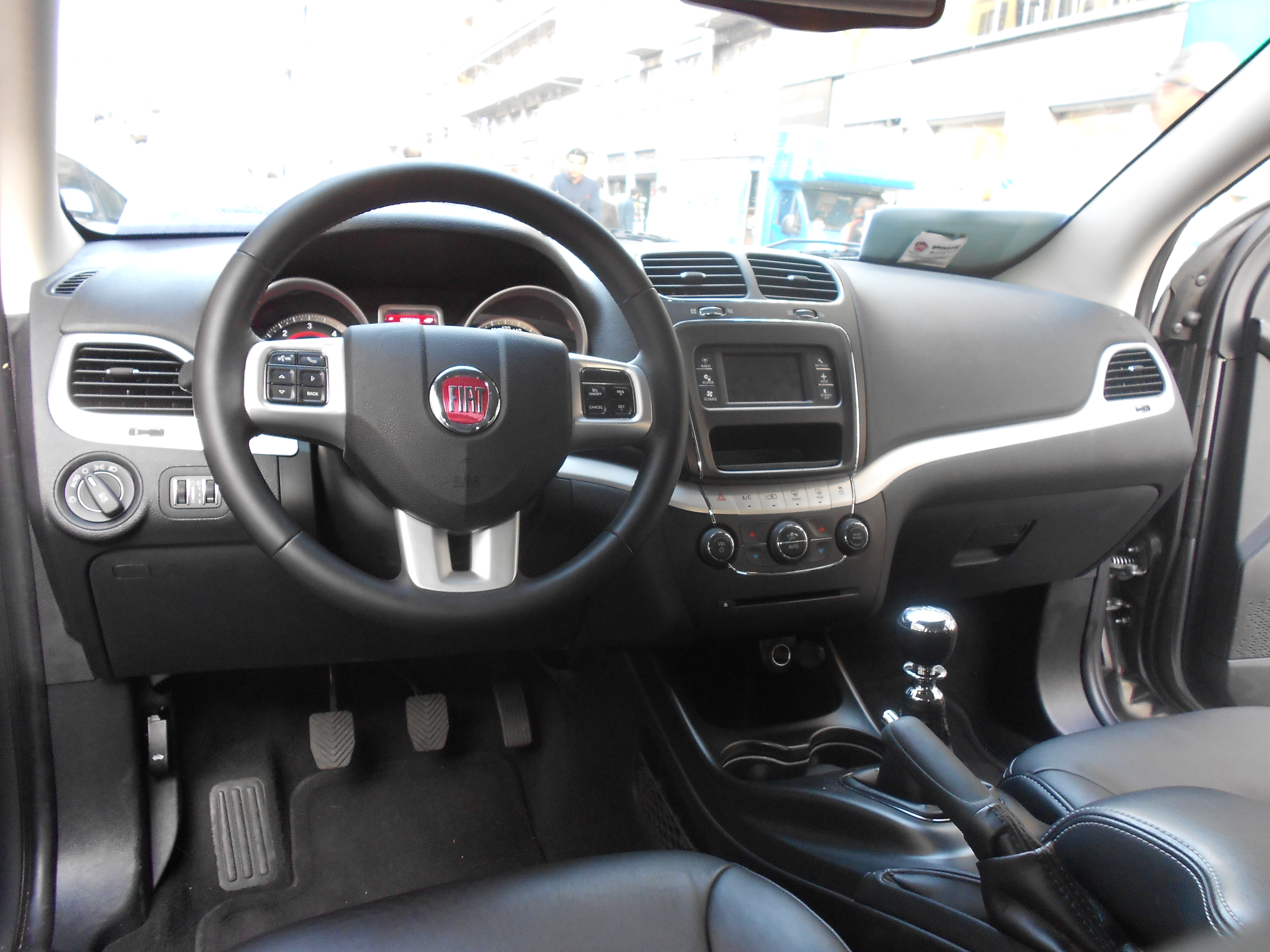
Interior

Chrysler marketed the Mexican manufactured Journey in Europe after model year 2011 as the Fiat Freemont, debuting the rebadged variant at the 2011 Geneva Motor Show.

The Freemont launched in Italy at the end of May 2011 with two front-wheel-drive turbodiesel variants the 140 PS (103 kW; 138 hp) and the 170 PS (125 kW; 168 hp) version of Fiat's 2.0-liter Multijet turbodiesel. Fiat also planned on introducing an all-wheel-drive version of the 170 PS (125 kW; 168 hp) diesel and the Pentastar V6.

FCA marketed the Freemont and the Journey in Australia, Brazil and China, with the Freemont available with the 2.0- and 2.4-liter four-cylinder engines in markets other than China, while the Journey is now only marketed with the Pentastar V6 engine (both engines were available before the launch of the Freemont).

The Freemont was originally available in left-hand drive (LHD) European markets only, except the Netherlands, and a right-hand drive (RHD) model was eventually introduced for Australia. The Freemont was discontinued after the 2015 model year.

== Engines ==
The available four-cylinder was a 2.4 L (146 cu in) with 173 hp (129 kW) and 166 lb⋅ft (225 N⋅m) of torque. This is a version of Chrysler's GEMA-built World Gasoline Engine class of four-cylinder engines shared with Hyundai and Mitsubishi. Through 2010, the V6 offered in North America was a 3.5 L (214 cu in) with a six-speed automatic transmission, producing 235 hp (175 kW) and 232 lb⋅ft (315 N⋅m) of torque. For 2011, it was changed to the 3.6-liter Pentastar V6, producing 283 hp (211 kW) and 260 lb⋅ft (353 N⋅m) of torque. Other markets offered the six-speed automatic transmission with the flex-fuel (E85-compatible) 2.7-liter V6. All-wheel drive was only available with a V6.

Additionally, through 2010, a Volkswagen-sourced diesel engine was available outside of North America with an automatically shifted dual clutch transmission. Chrysler performed primary engineering for the dual-clutch transmission with support from long-time partner Getrag, which was to build the transmission in the United States. Due to funding issues, this did not happen and the factory was sold and used for other purposes.

Dodge (USA)
Model	Engine	Displacement	Power (SAE)	Torque (SAE)	Fuel economy (MPG)	Years
2.4 World	I4	2,360 cc (144 cu in)	173 hp (129 kW; 175 PS) @6000 rpm	225 N⋅m (166 lb⋅ft) @4000 rpm	19 city/26 hwy	2008–2020
3.5 Chrysler SOHC	V6	3,518 cc (214.7 cu in)	235 hp (175 kW; 238 PS) @6400 rpm	315 N⋅m (232 lb⋅ft) @4000 rpm	16 city/22 hwy	2008–2011
3.6 Pentastar V6	V6	3,604 cc (219.9 cu in)	283 hp (211 kW; 287 PS) @6350 rpm	353 N⋅m (260 lb⋅ft) @4400 rpm	17 city/25 hwy	2011–2019
Dodge (Europe)
Model	Engine	Displacement	Power (EU)	Torque (EU)	Fuel economy (MPG)	Years
2.4 World	I4	2,360 cc (144 cu in)	170 PS (125 kW; 168 hp) @6000 rpm	220 N⋅m (162 lb⋅ft) @4400 rpm		2008–2011
2.7 Chrysler LH	V6	2,736 cc (167.0 cu in)	185 PS (136 kW; 182 hp) @5500 rpm	256 N⋅m (189 lb⋅ft) @4000 rpm		2008–2011
2.0 CRD (diesel)	I4	1,968 cc (120.1 cu in)	140 PS (103 kW; 138 hp) @4000 rpm	310 N⋅m (229 lb⋅ft) @1750–2500 rpm		2008–2011
Fiat
Model	Engine	Displacement	Power (EC)	Torque (EC)	Fuel economy (MPG)	CO_{2} emission (g/km)
2.4 World	I4	2,360 cc (144 cu in)	170 PS (125 kW; 168 hp) @6000 rpm	220 N⋅m (162 lb⋅ft) @4400 rpm		
3.6 Pentastar	V6	3,604 cc (219.9 cu in)	280 PS (206 kW; 276 hp) @6000 rpm	342 N⋅m (252 lb⋅ft) @4350 rpm		
2.0 Fiat Multijet (diesel)	I4	1,956 cc (119.4 cu in)	140 PS (103 kW; 138 hp) @4000 rpm	350 N⋅m (258 lb⋅ft) @1750–2500 rpm		
2.0 Fiat Multijet (diesel)	I4	1,956 cc (119.4 cu in)	170 PS (125 kW; 168 hp) @4000 rpm	350 N⋅m (258 lb⋅ft) @1750–2500 rpm	28 city/43 hwy	180

== Safety ==
The Dodge Journey (in the US & Canada) includes multi-stage front driver and passenger air bags, front-seat-mounted side air bags, three-row side-curtain air bags, standard four-wheel disc anti-lock brakes (ABS), electronic stability program (ESP), electronic roll mitigation, and brake assist.

ANCAP test results* Fiat Freemont (2013)
Test	Score
Overall	4 /5 stars
Frontal offset	12.15/16
Side impact	16/16
Pole	2/2
Seat belt reminders	2/3
Whiplash protection	Pending
Pedestrian protection	Marginal
Electronic stability control	Standard

Euro NCAP test results* Fiat Freemont (2011)
Test	Points	%
Overall:	5 /5 stars	
Adult occupant:	30	83%
Child occupant:	40	82%
Pedestrian:	18	50%
Safety assist:	5	71%

NHTSA 2012 Dodge Journey:
Overall:	4/5 stars
Frontal driver:	5/5 stars
Frontal passenger:	4/5 stars
Side driver:	5/5 stars
Side passenger:	4/5 stars
Side Pole Driver:	4/5 stars
Rollover FWD:	/ 18.5%
Rollover AWD:	/ 17.9%

Insurance Institute for Highway Safety (IIHS) was safety tested by IIHS in 2009

IIHS Dodge Journey scores:
Small overlap front:driver-side	Poor
Moderate overlap front	Good
Side	Good
Roof strength	Good

== Marketing ==
Dodge Journeys marketed in Japan are known as Dodge JC, to avoid confusion with Isuzu Journey. JCs were qualified by the Japanese government to be included in Subsidy Scheme for Environmentally Friendly Vehicles.

As part of the vehicle's introductory promotion, Dario Franchitti's No. 40 Dodge Charger carried a "Journey" paint scheme for the 2008 Daytona 500 on February 17, 2008.

== Sales ==
Calendar year	United States	Canada	Outside North America	Mexico	Europe		Brazil		Argentina	Colombia	Australia	
Calendar year	United States	Canada	Outside North America	Mexico	Journey	Freemont	Journey	Freemont	Argentina	Colombia	Journey	Freemont
2007	109				2							
2008	47,097	11,817	24,155	12,831	5,101		779					
2009	53,826	15,390	15,908	13,491	8,316		1,265					
2010	48,577	23,785		13,063	6,254		2,654		2,280	1,980		
2011	55,155	29,021	38,869	12,321	901	13,651	2,241	2,237	4,077	1,567	1,016	
2012	79,563	28,888	23,624	13,034	51	25,830	1,635	11,330	2,376	1,275	1,428	
2013	83,933	27,745		12,615	27	18,826	2,423	3,855	1,919		1,661	1,111
2014	93,572	24,715		11,688	2	17,417	2,971	3,707	428	561	1,547	1,560
2015	108,085	25,646		10,972	33	13,790	1,878	1,435	66		1,184	1,273
2016	106,759	16,883		7,698	65	3,084	674	665	15		366	464
2017	89,470	13,745		4,167		3	470	10	584			
2018	94,096	5,777		2,828		2	324		379	321		
2019	74,687	2,631		2,360		1	442		66	549		
2020	40,341	420		615			84		21			
2021	14,034	90										
