= Ultradrive =

Overview
- Manufacturer: Chrysler Corporation (1988–1998); DaimlerChrysler (1998–2007); Chrysler LLC (2007–2009); Chrysler Group LLC (2009–2014); FCA US LLC (2014–2021); Stellantis (2021–present)
- Also called: 41TE/A604; 42LE/A606; 40TE; 41AE; 40TES/41TES; 42RLE; 62TE
- Production: 1988–present

Body and chassis
- Class: 4- or 6-speed automatic

Chronology
- Predecessor: TorqueFlite

The Ultradrive is an automatic transmission manufactured by Chrysler beginning in the 1989 model year.

Initially produced in a single four-speed variant paired with the Mitsubishi (6G72) 3.0-liter engine in vehicles with transverse engines, application was expanded to the Chrysler 3.3- and 3.8-liter V6 engines in 1990 model year Dodge Caravan/Grand Caravan, Plymouth Voyager/Grand Voyager, Chrysler Town & Country, Dodge Dynasty and Chrysler New Yorker. A six-speed variant (62TE) was introduced in the 2007 model year and remains in production for several models as of 2019.

The Ultradrive and succeeding transmissions are produced at the Kokomo Transmission plant in Kokomo, Indiana, which also manufactures other Chrysler automatic transmissions. As of 2020, Dodge Journeys equipped with four-cylinder engines are the only applications of the four-speed Ultradrive (40TES) remaining in production. The Ram Promaster will be the only vehicle to use an Ultradrive transmission after 2020.

== History ==
The Ultradrive was a significant technological advancement in transmission operation, one of the first electronically controlled automatics. It pioneered many now-common features such as adaptive shifting, wherein the electronic control unit optimizes shifting based on the driving style of the operator. It earned a reputation for being unreliable. While the Ultradrive transmission had numerous issues, reportedly due to being rushed into production, a common problem was not necessarily caused by a design flaw, but by poor labelling: both owner's manuals and transmission fluid dipsticks advocated the use of Dexron transmission fluid in the event the required fluid was not available. The transmissions were designed to use a special fluid (Type 7176, also known as ATF+3, now superseded by ATF+4) and many owners reported failures from the use of Dexron, as well as temporary issues which were resolved when the proper fluid was added.

There may also have been mistaken impressions of failure due to the "limp home" feature. When the computer sensed a problem, such as a sensor giving an inappropriate reading, a code would be stored in the car's computer and the transmission would default to second gear only, under transmission computer control, so that owners could still drive to a service location for diagnosis or repairs. This may have caused perceptions of failure and premature replacement. A major drawback to the "second-gear-only limp mode" was, if second gear was the defective gear, the vehicle would not go forward.

The torque converter measured 9.5 in (24 cm) in diameter and was mounted to the flywheel by a flexible drive plate. The transaxle was cooled through an oil-to-water heat exchanger in the collector tank on the radiator, and/or a standard oil-to-air heat exchanger. There were no bands or mechanical holding devices; ratios were supplied by five different clutch packs. This allowed the transmission to be lightweight and to use fewer moving parts than the three speed it replaced.

The 41TE transmission which directly replaced the TorqueFlite had a similar design and could be considered an evolutionary change, but it included different valve bodies, solenoid packs, sensors, and other components to increase reliability. This line was also given a flash-programmable TCM and, in 2006, a variable line pressure hydraulic system was phased in, which boosted performance and longevity.

== "Autostick" option ==
In some applications, the driver could select a certain gear with an extra position on the stick. Marketed as "Autostick," activation required the driver to press a safety button on the selector stick, whereby and the selector could be moved to the "manual" position—where side-to-side movements towards the + and - icons (or pressing the + and - buttons on column-mounted selectors) made it possible to manually engage the transmission sequentially through all four forward speeds. The computer could override the gear selector to limit maximum engine RPM or prevent selection of a gear too low for vehicle speed. The option was advantageous in certain driving conditions, e.g., slippery roads or mountain driving.

== Technical information ==
There are currently four different types of units. Chrysler switched to a new coded naming convention in the 1990s. This new standard starts with two numbers, the number of gears (4–6) and the torque rating (0–9) plus two or three letters describing the unit.

TE: Transverse electronic
LE: Longitudinal electronic
AE: Transverse electronic all-wheel-drive

Differences in bell housing and bolt pattern can be seen between years and platforms (e.g. 2013 Grand Caravan RT platform 62TE is not bolt compatible with a 2013 ProMaster VF platform 62TE).

== A604/41TE ==
The 41TE is a four-speed transmission originally fitted on 1989 Dodge/Plymouth vehicles with the 3.0 L 6G72 V6. Applications include (but are not limited to) the Dodge Caravan/Grand Caravan, Plymouth Voyager/Grand Voyager, Dodge Shadow, Chrysler LeBaron and Chrysler Sebring (1995–1997).

Applications:

- 1989–1993 Chrysler New Yorker
- 1989–1995 Chrysler LeBaron
- 1989–2010 Dodge Caravan
- 1989–1993 Dodge Daytona IROC
- 1992–1993 Chrysler Daytona IROC (EU)
- 1989–1993 Dodge Dynasty
- 1989–1994 Dodge Shadow
- 1989–1994 Chrysler Saratoga (EU)
- 1989–1994 Plymouth Sundance
- 1989–1994 Dodge Spirit
- 1989–1994 Plymouth Acclaim
- 1989–2000 Plymouth Voyager
- 1990–1993 Chrysler Imperial
- 1990–1993 Chrysler New Yorker Fifth Avenue
- 1990–2010 Chrysler Town and Country
- 1992–1994 Plymouth Duster
- 1995–2000 Chrysler Cirrus
- 1995–2006 Chrysler Sebring
- 1995–2006 Chrysler Stratus (EU)
- 1995–2000 Dodge Avenger
- 1995–2006 Dodge Stratus
- 1995–2006 Chrysler Sebring (EU)
- 1996–2000 Plymouth Breeze
- 2000–2003 Chrysler Voyager (US)
- 1989–2007 Chrysler Voyager (intl.)
- 2001–2010 Chrysler PT Cruiser
- 2002–2003 Dodge Neon
- 2004–2008 Chrysler Pacifica
- 1995–1999 Mitsubishi Eclipse non-turbo
- 2008–2010 Volga Siber

=== 41AE ===
The 41AE is a variant of the 41TE that was originally used for the all-wheel drive variants of the minivans, and was also used for the Chrysler Pacifica from its 2004-model-year introduction until the model was discontinued in 2008.

Applications:

- 1991–2004 Chrysler Town and Country
- 1991–2004 Chrysler Voyager (intl.)
- 1991–2004 Dodge Caravan
- 1991–2000 Plymouth Voyager
- 2004–2008 Chrysler Pacifica

=== 40TE ===
Since 2003 (2004 model year), the 41TE was replaced by a similar but cheaper and lighter 40TE transmissions in cars equipped with inline-four-cylinder, or naturally aspirated engines.

Applications:

- 2003–2010 Chrysler PT Cruiser
- 2003–2006 Chrysler Sebring
- 2003–2007 Dodge Caravan
- 2003–2005 Dodge Neon
- 2003–2006 Dodge Stratus

== A606/42LE ==
The 42LE was an upgraded version of the 41TE modified for longitudinal engines. It debuted in 1993 on the LH cars. It is strengthened with a reworked final drive unit, barreled axle shafts, and upgraded clutch packs. The major modification to a longitudinal drivetrain while maintaining front wheel drive was accomplished by adding a differential to the transmission case, which was driven by means of a transfer chain from the output shaft of the low/reverse clutch assembly at the rear of the transmission case.

Applications:

- 42LE
  - 1999–2004 Chrysler 300M
  - 1993–2004 Chrysler Concorde
  - 1994–2001 Chrysler LHS
  - 2001–2002 Chrysler Prowler
  - 1994–1996 Chrysler New Yorker
  - 1993–2004 Dodge Intrepid
  - 1993–1997 Eagle Vision
  - 1997–2002 Plymouth Prowler

== 42RLE ==
The 42LE was modified in 2003 as the 42RLE, originally for the then-new Jeep Liberty. It is a 42LE transaxle, modified for use in rear-wheel drive vehicles by removing the integral differential and transfer chain. Power flow exits the rear of the transmission. The case has also been modified. By design, it has full-electronic shift control with adaptive memory to learn the operator's driving habits controlled by the vehicle's Transmission Control Module (TCM). Contained within the automatic's torque converter is an Electronically Modulated Converter Clutch (EMCC), designed to act as a shock absorber for harsh shifting. 42RLE production ceased in early 2012.

Gear Ratios for the 42RLE:

- 1st: 2.80
- 2nd: 1.55
- 3rd: 1.00
- 4th: 0.69

Applications:

- 42RLE
  - 2005–2010 Chrysler 300
  - 2006–2010 Dodge Charger
  - 2004–2011 Dodge Dakota
  - 2004–2009 Dodge Durango
  - 2005–2008 Dodge Magnum
  - 2007–2011 Dodge Nitro
  - 2003–2012 Jeep Liberty
  - 2003–2011 Jeep Wrangler
  - 2009 Dodge Challenger V6
  - 2003–2012 Dodge Ram

== 40TES/41TES ==
The 40TES and 41TES are upgraded replacement versions of the 41TE, which were first introduced with the 2007 Chrysler Sebring. The 40TES is used with the 2.4 L GEMA I4 engine while the 41TES is used with the 2.7 L EER V6. The difference between the TES and TE is the TES has a shallower bell housing and the torque converter is more compact. This was done for the revised packaging of the 2007 Sebring's engine compartment. The 40TES and 41TES are also known As VLP, (Variable Line Pressure) Transmissions: a pressure sensor and line pressure solenoid were added to the valve body, in addition to the solenoid pack that bolts to the outside of the case. This resulted in an additional harness connector coming through the case near the manual linkage.

Applications:

- 2007–2010 Chrysler Sebring
- 2011–2014 Chrysler 200
- 2008–2014 Dodge Avenger
- 2009–2020 Dodge Journey

== 62TE ==
The 62TE is a six-speed derivative of the 41TE, first introduced on 2007 Chrysler Sebring models fitted with the 3.5L EGJ V6. Applications also include the Pacifica crossover (4.0L), the RT Platform minivans (3.8L & 4.0L V6; also 2.8L diesel for Europe) and the Dodge Journey (3.5L & 3.6L).

Applications:

- 2007–2008 Chrysler Pacifica
- 2007–2010 Chrysler Sebring
- 2011–2014 Chrysler 200
- 2008–2014 Dodge Avenger
- 2008–2016 Chrysler Town and Country
- 2011– Lancia Voyager
- 2008–2016 Chrysler Grand Voyager
- 2008–2020 Dodge Grand Caravan
- 2009–2014 Volkswagen Routan
- 2009–2019 Dodge Journey
- 2014–2021 Ram ProMaster

== Problems ==
The most common problems (shift stuck-, limp mode-, blocking problems) with the Chrysler Ultradrive transmissions are poor shifting quality and sudden locks into second gear ("limp-home" mode) caused by the transmission computer detecting problems with sensor data. Nine design changes were made in an attempt to fix clutch failure, and four were directed to excessive shifting on hills.

After pressure from the US Center for Auto Safety, Consumer Reports, and others, Chrysler LLC promised to waive the $100 deductible in the warranty, provide loaners, and buy back any cars with Ultradrives that could not be fixed (US located cars only). Chrysler ran a campaign to contact all American owners of cars with Ultradrives to find and fix problems.

== See also ==
- List of Chrysler transmissions
