= Lamborghini Portofino =

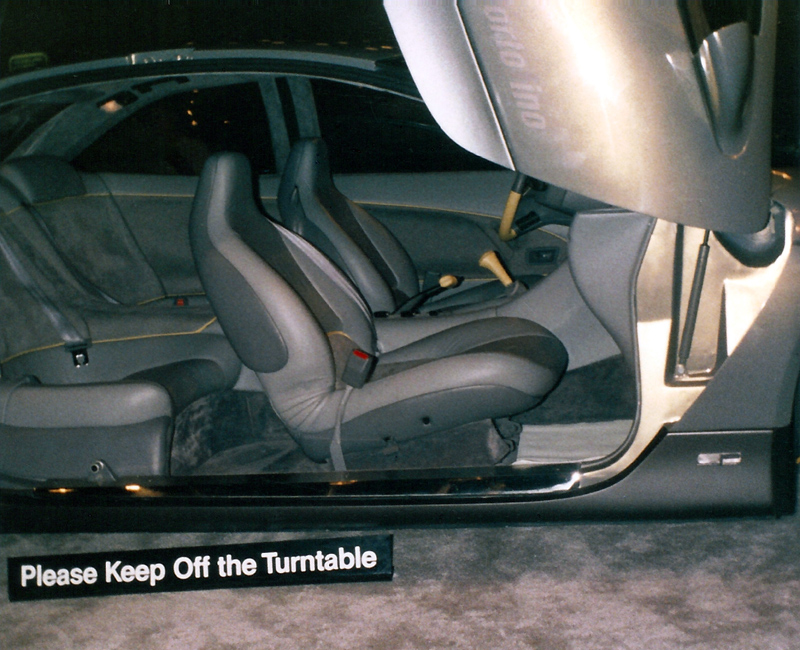
- Lamborghini Portofino interior

Overview
- Manufacturer: Lamborghini
- Also called: Chrysler Portofino
- Production: 1987; 1 built
- Designer: Kevin Verduyn

Body and chassis
- Class: Concept car
- Body style: 4-door sedan
- Layout: Mid-engine rear-wheel drive
- Doors: Scissor doors (front); Suicide scissor doors (rear)
- Related: Lamborghini Jalpa

Powertrain
- Engine: 3.5 L V8
- Transmission: 5-speed manual

The Lamborghini Portofino is a concept car developed for Lamborghini by Kevin Verduyn, one of Chrysler's chief designers. Introduced at the 1987 Frankfurt Auto Show, it was a fully functional, four-door, four-seat sport sedan.

== Design ==
In 1986, Kevin Verduyn designed a concept car model for Chrysler called the Navajo. The concept never went beyond the clay model stage, but when Chrysler acquired Automobili Lamborghini S.p.A. in 1987, the design was resurrected and with some fairly minor tweaks, turned into the Portofino.

The Portofino was built by Coggiola of Turin, Italy on a lengthened Jalpa chassis, giving the car a mid-engine rear-wheel drive layout. It also used the Jalpa's 3.5 L V8 water-cooled engine and 5-speed manual transmission. The engine could rev to 7,000 rpm, with 64.6 bhp/liter. The Portofino featured dual scissor doors, enclosing a pillarless passenger compartment. The front doors pivoted forward and upward, as in Lamborghini's Countach. The rears were also scissor-style, but pivoted upward to the rear. The logo on the hood featured the Lamborghini bull inside the Chrysler Pentastar.

While the Portofino was a one-of-a-kind concept car and while Chrysler ownership of Lamborghini would not survive, the concept's design would inform and influence Chrysler cars for the next two decades. The wide-and-low stance and the open-plan interior would become the hallmark of the Chrysler LH body vehicles and their "cab-forward" design standard (which was extensively marketed as such). The triangular headlights and dual notched rear indicators would find their way directly to the first generation Dodge Intrepid and would serve as key design points throughout that vehicle's existence.

== Prototype ==
Only the single prototype Portofino, chassis #LC0001, was ever produced. In 1991, it was heavily damaged in an accident in transit. However, Chrysler had it restored by Metalcrafters in Costa Mesa, California for $300,000, and it is now on display at Chrysler headquarters in Auburn Hills, Michigan. From November 15, 2020 to January 9, 2022, the Portofino was one of 12 vehicles on display at the Detroit Institute of Arts, part of a special exhibit titled "Detroit Style: Car Design in the Motor City, 1950–2020".

The Portofino was notable for being an early example of cab-forward styling, and many aspects of its design made it into the Chrysler LH platform which initially included the Chrysler Concorde, Dodge Intrepid and Eagle Vision.
