= Chrysler 300M =

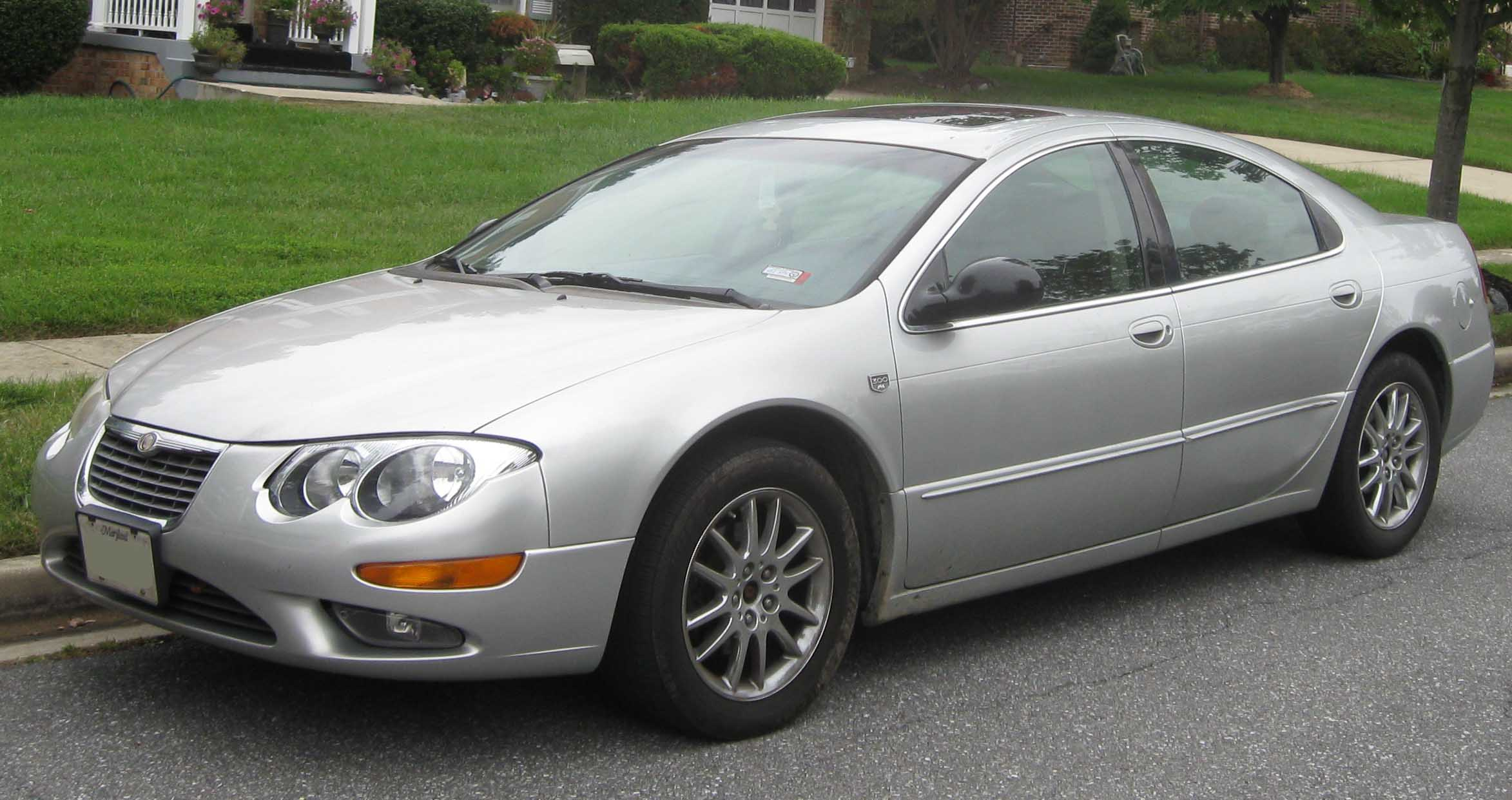

Overview
- Manufacturer: DaimlerChrysler
- Production: 1998–2003
- Model years: 1999–2004
- Assembly: Canada: Brampton, Ontario (Brampton Assembly)

Body and chassis
- Class: Full-size luxury car
- Body style: 4-door sedan
- Layout: Longitudinal front mid-engine, front-wheel drive
- Platform: Chrysler LH platform
- Related: Chrysler Concorde; Chrysler LHS; Dodge Intrepid

Powertrain
- Engine: 2.7 L EER V6 (Europe); 3.5 L EGG V6
- Transmission: 4-speed 42LE automatic with option for manual shifting

Dimensions
- Wheelbase: 113.0 in (2,870 mm)
- Length: 197.8 in (5,024 mm)
- Width: 74.4 in (1,890 mm)
- Height: 56.0 in (1,422 mm); Special: 55.5 in (1,410 mm)

Chronology
- Predecessor: Chrysler 300 letter series Chrysler 300 non-letter series Eagle Vision
- Successor: Chrysler 300 (2005)

The Chrysler 300M is a full-size luxury car that was produced by DaimlerChrysler from 1999 to 2004. It is a front-wheel drive, 255 hp (190 kW; 259 PS) V6 engined car using the Chrysler LH platform. Versus its platform mates, the 300M was roughly 10 inches (25 cm) shorter to make it more easily exportable to Europe. Priced above the Concorde and identically to the LHS, the 300M shared Chrysler's flagship position with the LHS until the LHS's discontinuation after 2001, upon which it became Chrysler's sole flagship model.

== Design ==
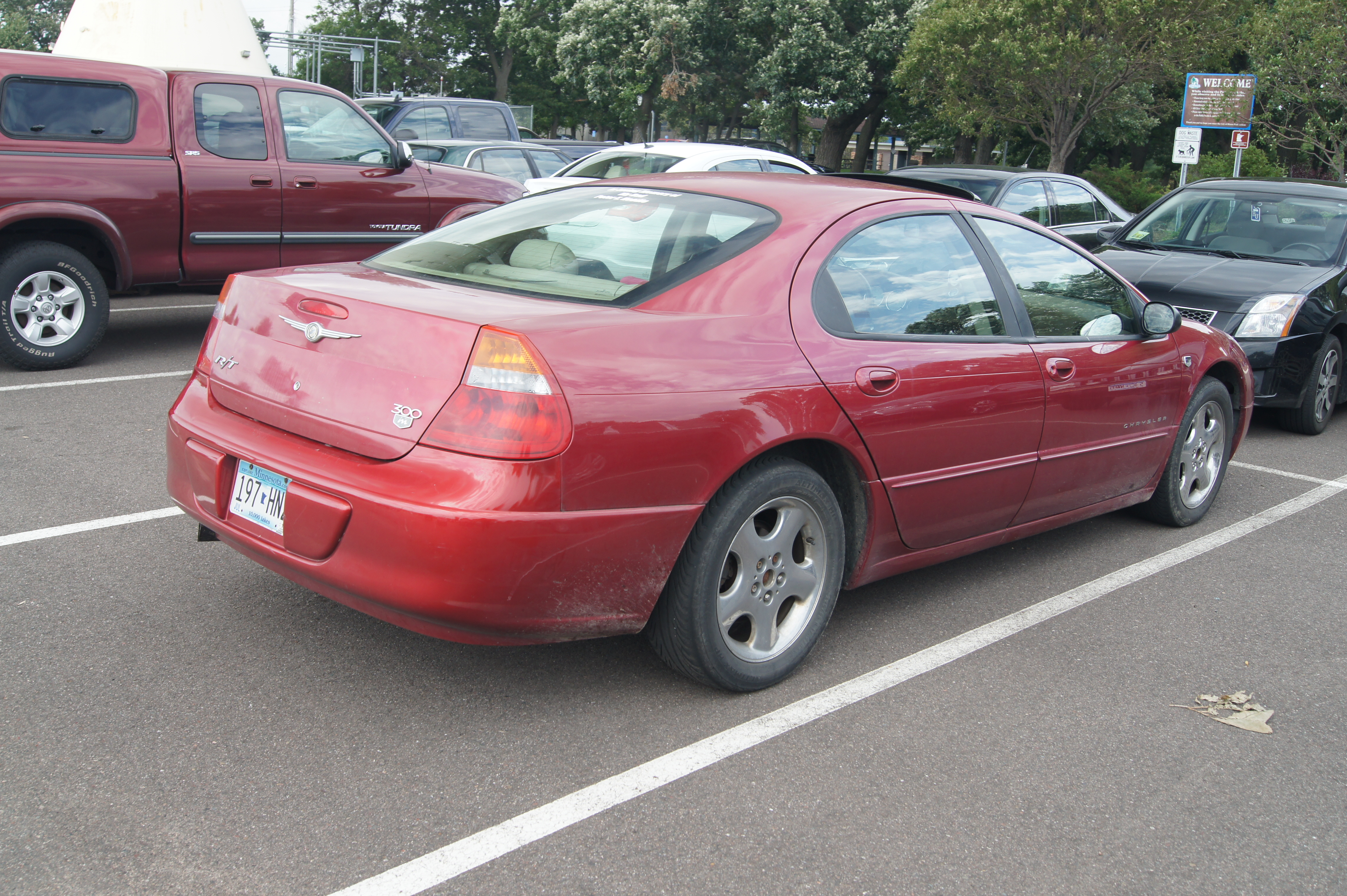
1999 Chrysler 300M

Prior to Chrysler redesigning the LH-cars in 1998, the Eagle Vision filled the "import-fighter" segment. Its second-generation replacement was reportedly benchmarked against the BMW 5 Series, yet with Chrysler discontinuing the entire Eagle line after 1998, the automaker shifted this vehicle to the Chrysler lineup, bringing back the famed "300" model name. Although the cars were neither rear-wheel-drive special-production models, nor V8-powered with engines rated at 300 horsepower as were the historic models, the 300M used the next letter available in the 300 Letter Series, following the 1965 300L. The 300M also lacked the traditional "cross-hair" grille of previous 300 models, as by the mid-1980s it had been adopted by sister division Dodge for its entire model line.

Had the Eagle brand not been dropped, the 300M reportedly would have been sold as a redesigned Eagle Vision. Test cars, factory manuals, and design images were prepared for the second-generation Vision featuring a prominent Eagle badge on the grille. Sharing its powertrain and interior with the Chrysler LHS, the 300M was some ten inches shorter in overall length, allowing it to fit the European "5-metre" (16.4 ft) size class for exports to Europe. Despite this, wheelbase was shared with all other second generation LH cars, with reductions in length coming from shortened front and rear overhangs.

== Powertrain ==
Only one engine was available, the Chrysler-engineered 3.5 L V6, initially created for first-generation LH vehicles and revamped for the newer LH line. It was shared with the Plymouth Prowler and a limited edition R/T variant of the second-generation Dodge Intrepid. The engine was shared with the LHS and rebadged Concorde (2002–2004). For 1999, it was rated at 253 hp (189 kW; 257 PS), and 255 lb⋅ft (346 N⋅m) of torque. It was connected to the 42LE, a four-speed automatic transmission with Autostick, which allowed manual selection of gears. Standard gear ratio on the 300M was 3.66:1.

== Year-to-year changes ==
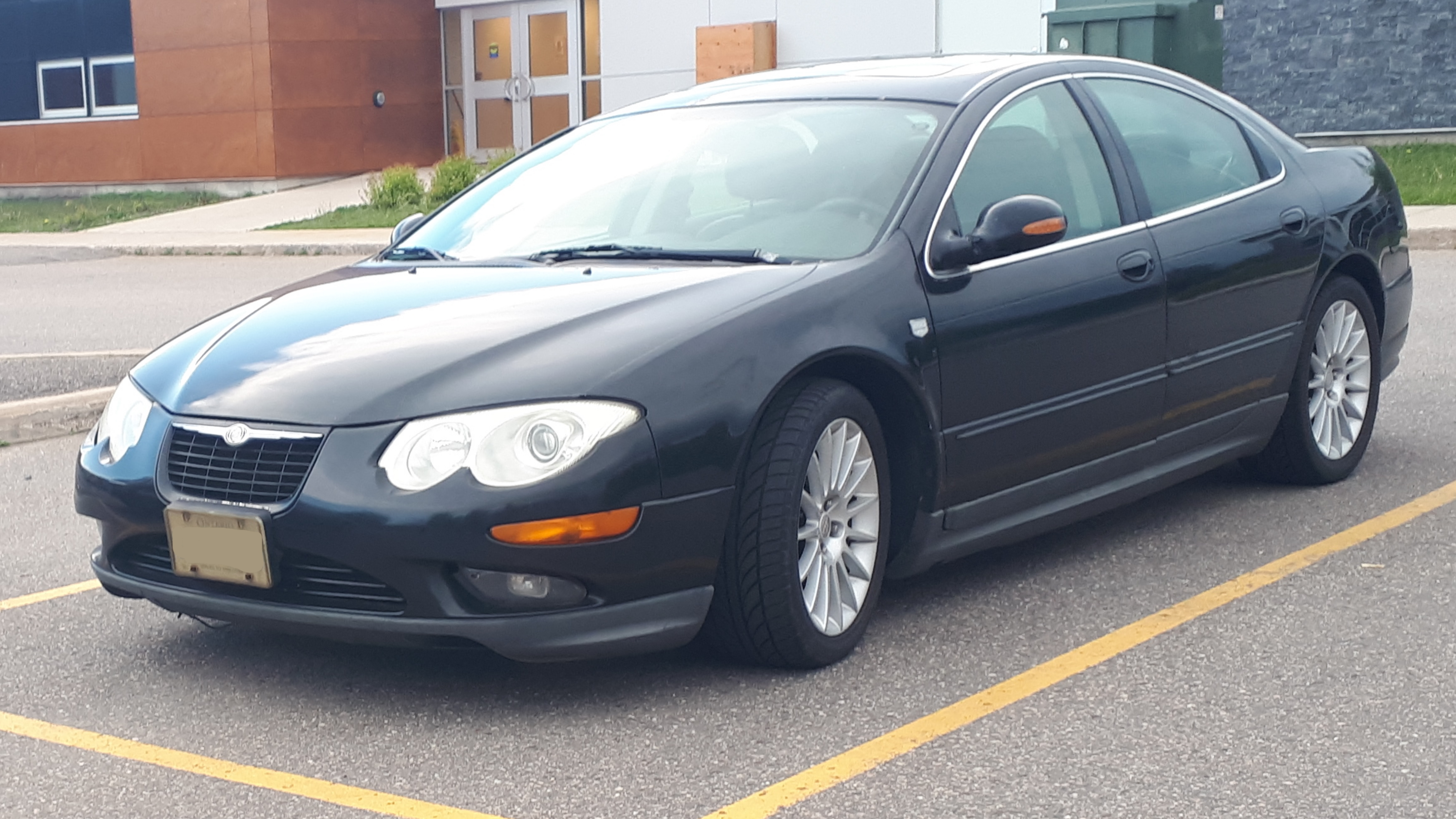
Chrysler 300M Special

In 1999, automatic headlamps were added, and the Handling Group removed the speed limiter. In 2000, an interlock was added to prevent shifting the transmission from Park unless the brake pedal was pressed; and tether anchors were added to the rear shelf for child seats. The 2001 model year brought more changes, with an optional luxury group that included an automatic dimming driver-side mirror and supplemental side airbags. A more advanced EVIC (trip computer) was made optional. The 300M also received new jeweled taillights.

In 2002, electronic brake distribution was added to the antilock brakes; a new computer combined engine and transmission controls; latch tethers were now built-in; and "natural" evaporative emission monitoring was added. The 300M Special was offered beginning midyear 2002. It featured a 255 hp (190 kW; 259 PS) 3.5 liter engine designed to use premium (91+ octane) gasoline and producing 258 pound force-feet (350 N⋅m) of torque, with a 3.89 final drive ratio. Performance-type dual exhaust, high-performance brakes, and 18-inch Z-rated tires were standard, with Michelin Pilot Sport 245/45R18 performance tires optional. Other standard features of the Special included premium "Waterfall" leather seats, signal mirrors, body cladding, and slightly lower ride height. This model also included high-intensity discharge headlamps and imitation-carbon-fiber interior trim panels that replaced the standard woodgrain trim panels. A limited number of 300M "Pro-Am" models were marketed during 2002. These versions included an Infinity audio system with subwoofers as well as two-toned leather interiors. The Pro-Am also came with a set of limited edition golf clubs and a holder for a golf bag in the trunk. In 2003, new colors were added, a six-disc CD changer replaced the four-disc changer, and the changer controls were added to the stereo.

2004 brought optional Sirius Satellite Radio and an optional stereo with DVD-based GPS navigation. For the 2004 model year, Chrysler offered the Platinum Series 300M to coincide with the company's 20th anniversary of Chrysler's original minivan (Dodge Caravan/Chrysler Town & County/Plymouth Voyager). In addition to the 300M, five other vehicles were offered as Platinum Series: the Sebring Convertible, PT Cruiser, Sebring Sedan, Sebring Coupe, and Town & Country. The Platinum Series 300M was available only in three exterior colors: Graphite Metallic, Bright Silver Metallic, or Brilliant Black Crystal. Other features included: deep slate/light taupe two-tone interior, chrome door handles, deep gloss black turn signal mirrors with a reverse gear auto pivot feature, and 17-inch chrome wheels. A 360-watt Infinity II Cassette/CD player, and a no-charge SIRIUS satellite radio system with a one-year SIRIUS subscription were also included. Additional features include leather seats, satin silver bezels, chrome or platinum clad wheels, and other unique interior features. These models have a special Platinum Series badging on the C pillars.

For 2005, both the 300M and the Concorde were replaced with the Chrysler 300.

== Awards ==
The 300M was Motor Trend magazine's Car of the Year for 1999. It also was on Car and Driver magazine's Ten Best list for 1999 and 2000.

== See also ==
- Chrysler 300 letter series
- Chrysler 300 non-letter series
