= Eagle Vision =

Car model built by Chrysler

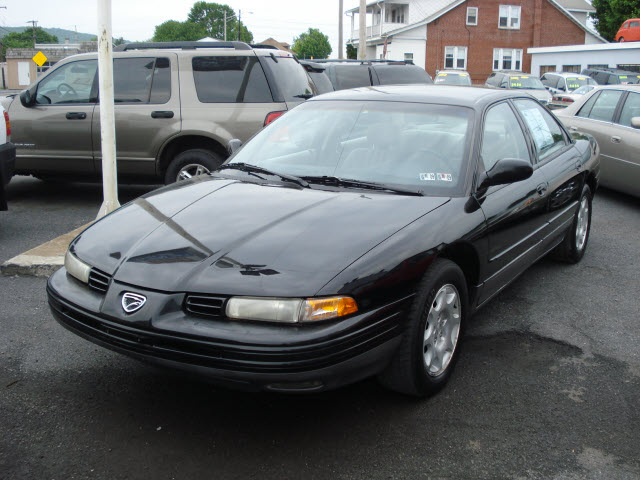

Overview
- Manufacturer: Chrysler Corporation
- Also called: Chrysler Vision (Europe)
- Production: 1992–September 5, 1997
- Model years: 1993–1997
- Assembly: Canada: Brampton, Ontario (Brampton Assembly)

Body and chassis
- Class: Full size luxury car
- Body style: 4-door sedan
- Layout: Longitudinal front-engine, front-wheel drive
- Platform: Chrysler LH platform
- Related: Chrysler Concorde; Chrysler LHS; Chrysler New Yorker; Dodge Intrepid

Powertrain
- Engine: 3.3 L EGA V6; 3.5 L EGE V6
- Transmission: 4-speed 42LE automatic

Dimensions
- Wheelbase: 113.0 in (2,870 mm)
- Length: 201.6 in (5,121 mm)
- Width: 74.4 in (1,890 mm)
- Height: MY 1993-94: 55.8 in (1,417 mm); MY 1995-97: 56.3 in (1,430 mm)
- Curb weight: 3,371 lb (1,529 kg)

Chronology
- Predecessor: Eagle Premier
- Successor: Chrysler 300M

The Eagle Vision is a full-sized, front-wheel drive four-door sports sedan produced from 1992 until 1997. Marketed by the newly-formed Eagle brand by Chrysler Corporation, it replaced the AMC/Renault-designed Eagle Premier. The Eagle Vision was badged as the Chrysler Vision in Europe.

The Vision debuted at the 1992 North American International Auto Show in Detroit. As one of the LH sedans, it was Automobile Magazine's Automobile of the Year in 1993, and ultimately the only Eagle model to be wholly designed and built in-house by Chrysler.

== Design background ==
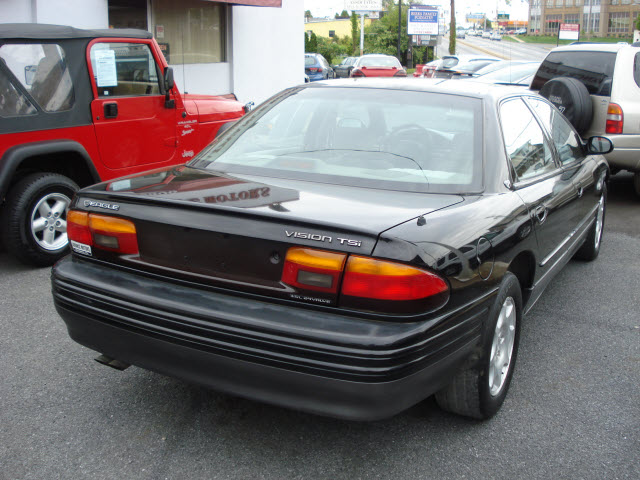
1995 Eagle Vision TSi rear

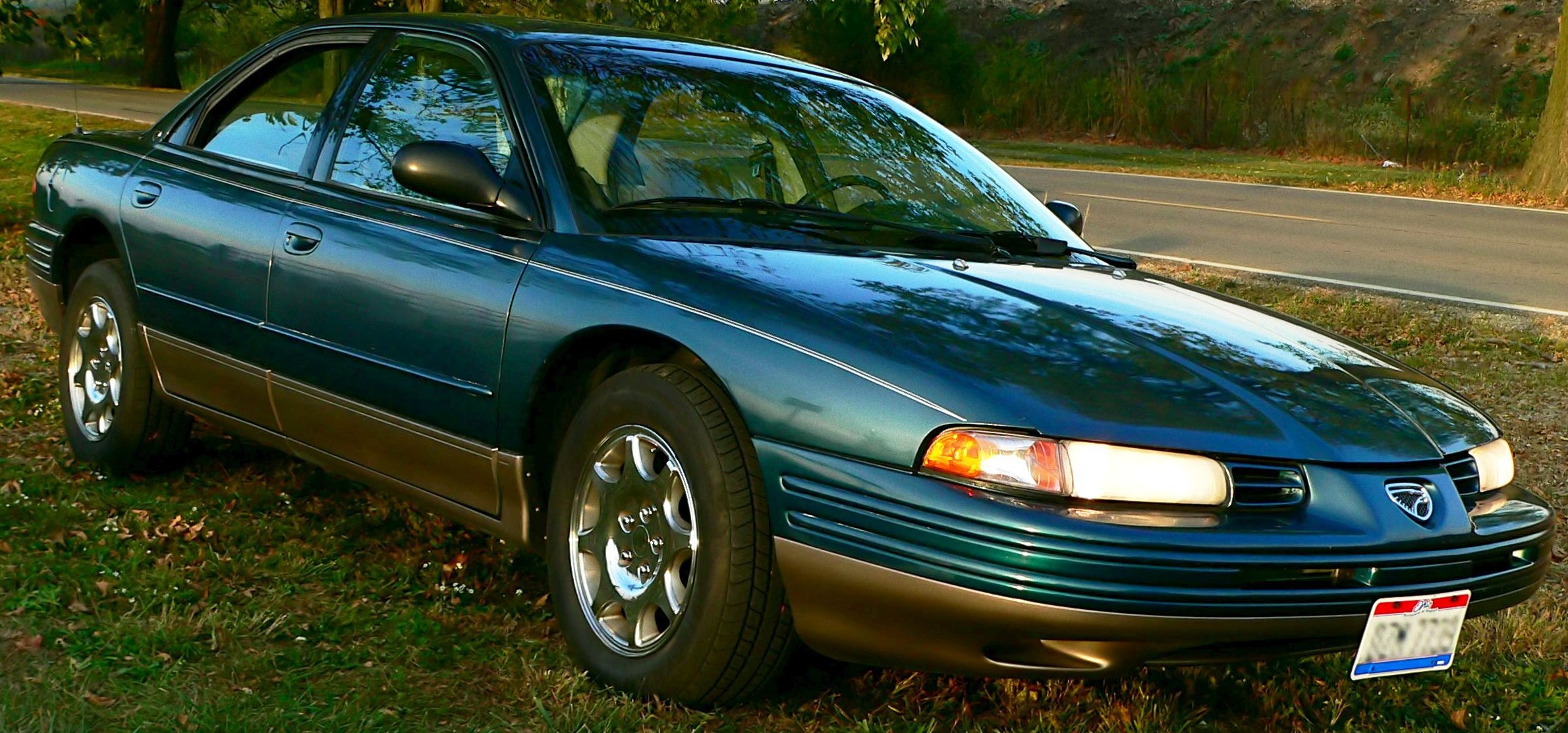
1995 Eagle Vision ESi

The Vision's design can be traced to 1985 at the automaker's Advanced Concept Studio in Carlsbad, California. The lead designer, Kevin Verduyn, goal was an "exotic, four-passenger, grand-tourer for the 1990s." The design process was to focus on the interior and then work out the outside. This provided generous space for passengers while the layout generated a new proportion on which to build the exterior design with an aerodynamic concept. Using full-sized drawings, the studio sculptors created a fiberglass full-size model code-named "Navajo". After a management review in 1986, the design was sent to the Chrysler Center in Highland Park, Michigan. The Navajo proposal generated enthusiasm, but there was no chassis to accommodate the design.

In March 1987, the Chrysler Corporation purchased Lamborghini, the bankrupt Italian sports car manufacturer. Chrysler's acquisition of Lamborghini sparked plans for a mutually beneficial partnership. Chrysler offered the Italian sports car maker access to resources and technology. To mark this, Chrysler aimed to unveil an eye-catching prototype at the 1987 Frankfurt Auto Show that was scheduled less than six months away, showcasing their European re-entry. The Highland Park design team assumed the project given the tight schedule. The Navajo body provided the initial form on a modified wheelbase Lamborghini Jalpa chassis. The Navajo's exterior design was reworked and became the Lamborghini Portofino. The concept was heralded as a design triumph, setting in motion Chrysler's decision to produce a production sedan with the Portofino's revolutionary exterior design, called "cab forward". This body design was characterized by the long, low-slung windshield and relatively short overhangs. The wheels were effectively pushed to the car's corners, creating a larger passenger cabin than contemporary vehicles in its class.

The design of the chassis began in the late 1980s after Chrysler bought American Motors Corporation (AMC) in 1987, from which the Eagle division is derived. During this time, Chrysler began designing replacements for the Dodge Dynasty, Chrysler Fifth Avenue, and a potential Plymouth version. The initial design of Dodge's LH bore a resemblance to the outgoing Dynasty, and this design was scrapped entirely after François Castaing, formerly AMC's Vice President of product engineering and development, became Chrysler's Vice President of vehicle engineering in 1988. Under Castaing's leadership, the new design began with the Eagle Premier.

The chassis design was continually refined throughout the following years, as it underpinned more Chrysler concepts: the 1989 Chrysler Millennium and 1990 Eagle Optima. The Premier's longitudinal engine mounting layout was inherited, as were the front suspension geometry and braking system. The chassis itself became a flexible architecture capable of supporting front or rear-wheel drive (designated "LH" and "LX" respectively). The transmission was inspired by the Premier's Audi and ZF automatics. Borrowing heavily from Chrysler's A604 (41TE) "Ultradrive" transversely mounted automatic, it became the A606 (also known as 42LE).

By 1990, Chrysler managers decided that the new technologically advanced car would need to include an updated engine. Until then, the only engine confirmed for use was Chrysler's 3.3 L pushrod V6. The 3.3 L engine's 60° block was bored out to 3.5 L, while the pushrod-actuated valves were replaced with SOHC cylinder heads with four valves per cylinder, making it an advanced 3.5 L V6.

The appearance of the Vision continued the cab-forward exterior design of the 1987 Lamborghini Portofino concept with its aerodynamic shape, contributing to little wind noise inside this large car. The engineering and sleek styling gave the Vision a low drag coefficient (0.31), equal to the two-seat Porsche 997 sports car.

Without badges, the Vision could easily pass as a (first-generation) Concorde. The main difference between the two are the taillight clusters. Like the European sedans it was marketed to compete against, the Vision incorporates rear amber turn signals over the Concorde's red ones. Neither does the Vision have the Concorde's faux rear lightbar between the taillights. While the two cars share headlights, the Vision's grille is smaller and, separated by its prominent center badge, has been likened to the appearance of "nostrils." The interior of the Vision is nearly identical to the Concorde, the most significant difference being the absence of the Concorde's faux wood trim and steering wheel emblem. Unlike the Vision, the Concorde never offered the Autostick option. Marketed as a sports sedan, the Vision featured bucket seats with a center console, never having an available split bench with a column-mounted shifter.

The Vision featured a monochromatic design inside and out, with no brand or model badge on the doors (as found on the Concorde) and available aluminum wheels with a simple design. The single-color motif was more pronounced on models without the grey lower body trim paint scheme. In keeping with its high-performance image, the Vision was the only LH sedan to come standard with "touring" suspension. "Performance" suspension was an available option on the Vision.

The upscale TSi model featured leather-trimmed seats, 8-way power seats for both the driver and front passenger, a leather-wrapped steering wheel, a leather shift knob, cloth door inserts, rear seat vents, center rear armrest, and personal reading lamps.

Power windows and central door locks were standard for both trims, as were dual airbags, with remote keyless entry available. Among the factory-installed sound systems was the top-of-the-line Infinity sound system, which included eight speakers throughout the cabin and an equalizer. Head units included a radio with either cassette or CD playback and a maximum five-band adjustable graphic equalizer.

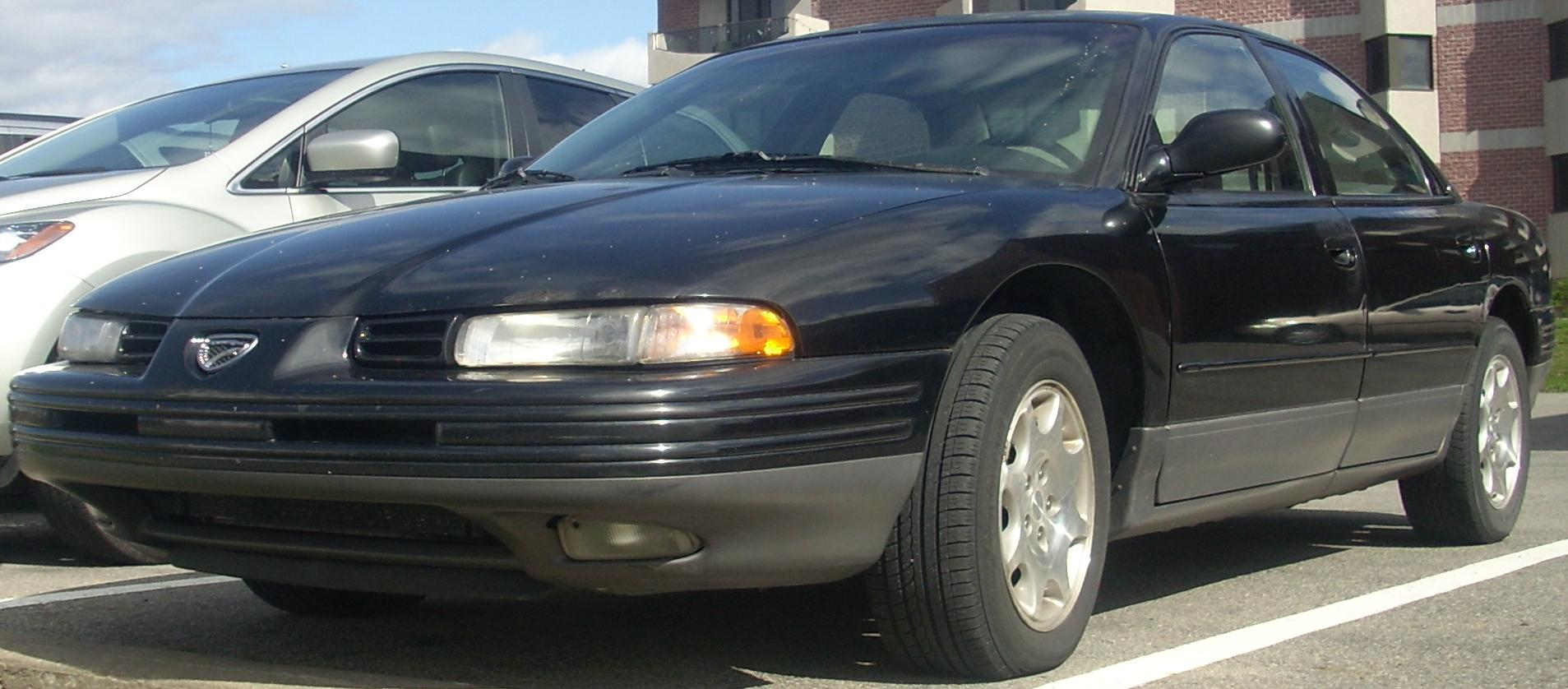
1993–1995 Eagle Vision with grey lower body trim

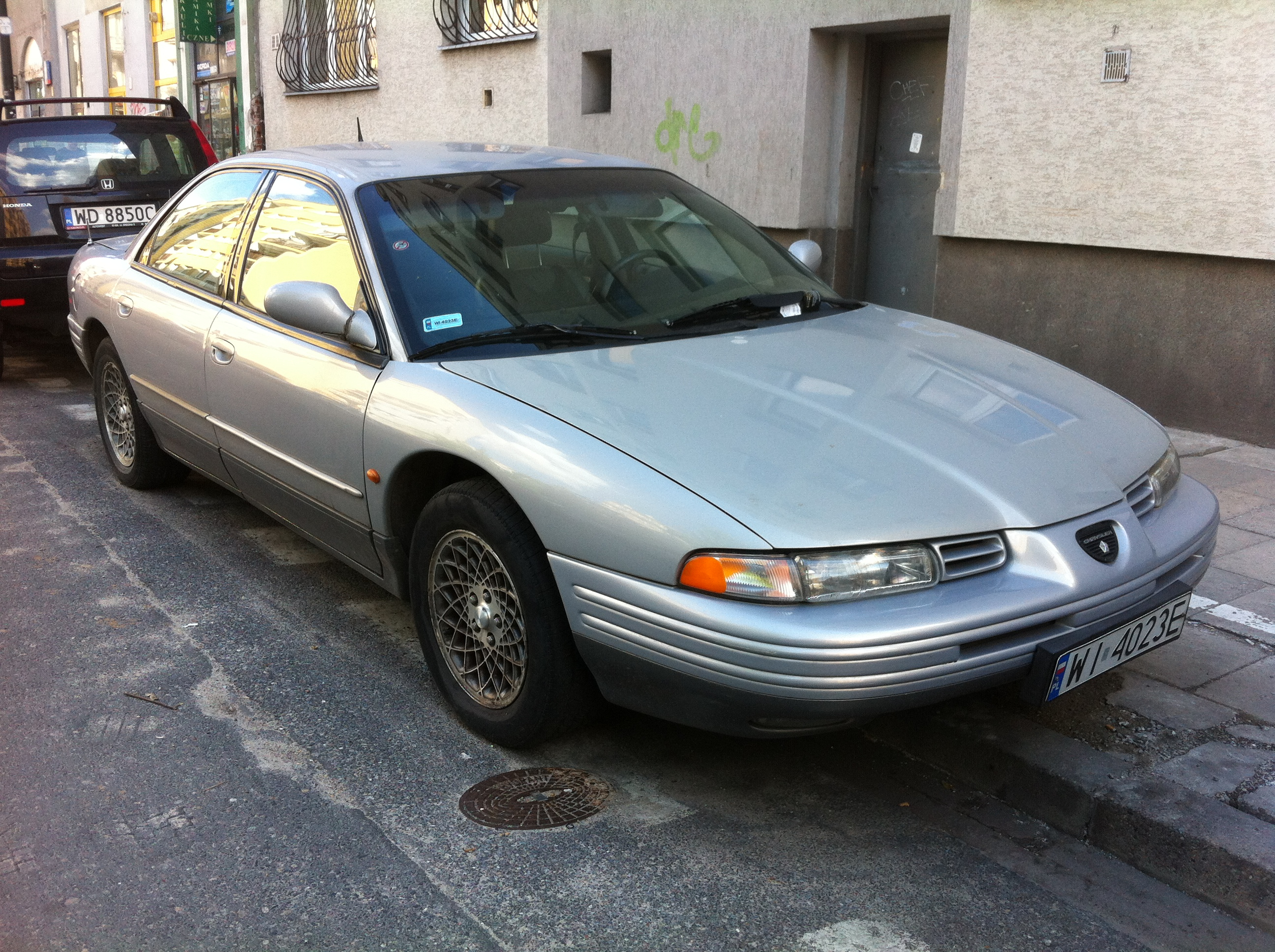
Chrysler Vision in Poland

The TSi model was distinguishable as it did not have a fixed mast antenna, but included a retractable powered system inside the rear right fender. Anti-lock brakes (ABS) were standard, with traction control optional.

Dual-way power sunroofs were available on this car in either trim. They were designed and installed by American Sunroof Corp. (now ASC Global) from its Columbus, Ohio plant, not by Mopar itself. An installed sunroof eliminated most of the front overhead console that featured storage bins for a garage door opener and sunglasses. However, the Overhead Travel Information System (OTIS), an onboard computer with integrated map lights, was retained.

The Vision was generally the middle offering of the original three LH cars, with the ESi priced between a base Intrepid and a base Concorde (usually just under the Concorde by a few hundred dollars). However, the TSi's base price was more than the basic Concorde version. The other LH cars, the New Yorker and LHS, were priced higher than the Vision.

=== Trims ===
- ESi - 1993–1997
- TSi - 1993–1997

== Drivetrains ==
The Eagle Vision ESi came equipped with a 3.3 L V6 engine initially rated 153 bhp (114 kW) which was raised to 162 bhp (121 kW) in the 1994 and 1995 models. For 1996, it lost 4 hp (3 kW), but gained 9 ft·lbf of torque. The TSi featured the more powerful SOHC 24-valve 3.5 L V6 engine rated at 214 bhp (160 kW).

Both engines included a 4-speed automatic transmission. The 1996 and 1997 TSi with its 3.5 had the 4-speed AutoStick option featuring a unique PRNDL mechanism invented by Peter Gruich.

- 3.3 L V6 – Horsepower and Torque: 153 bhp (114 kW) & 177 lb⋅ft (240 N⋅m) (1992–93), 162 bhp (121 kW) & 194 lb⋅ft (263 N⋅m) (1994–1995) and, 158 bhp (118 kW) & 203 lb⋅ft (275 N⋅m) (1996–1997)
- 3.5 L V6 – 214 bhp (160 kW) & 221 lb⋅ft (300 N⋅m)

The 3.3 L engine was engineered to run on 87 octane gasoline, while the larger 3.5 requires mid-grade 89 octane fuel as a minimum, but benefits from premium 91 octane fuel.

== Year-to-year changes ==
=== 1994 ===
- Variable-assist power steering was available, providing more feel at higher speeds. Both models now wore the same lower-body cladding, minimizing the evident differences between the ESi and TSi. The 3.3 L engine's power output was increased by 8 hp, while the 4-speed automatic transmission was revised for smoother shifting.

=== 1995 ===
- New standard features included heated power exterior rear-view mirrors, power windows, and an AM/FM stereo with a cassette player. The 3.5 engine became available as an upgrade option for the ESi trim level.

=== 1996 ===
- A new Autostick shifting feature became available for the TSi trim. The car could be "manually" shifted by tilting the shift knob right or left to change gears up or down. Plastic lower trim was deleted in favor of body color lower trim for a monochromatic color scheme. The Pentastar logo previously present on the front fenders in front of the doors was deleted. Windshield wiper jets were moved from the wiper arms to the hood. All 1996 Eagle Visions were made OBD-II compliant.
- The headlights are now more powerful.

=== 1997 ===
- Only minor changes were made to the 1997 Vision. After this model year, the Vision was discontinued.

== Discontinuation ==
The Vision sold around 105,000 units, from 1993 to 1997, and Chrysler was planning to continue it to redesign the LH cars for 1998. Some prototypes featured the Eagle logo, and Vision production continued into September 1997 to offer dealers an adequate amount of 1997 models, until the introduction redesigned 1998 Vision. However, Chrysler made the decision to stop production of the Vision and Talon (Eagle's only other model by then) with the last unit built on September 5, 1997. On September 29, 1997, the automaker notified 2,340 U.S. and 337 Canadian dealers that the Eagle brand would be discontinued by the end of the 1998 model year.

The car that was planned to be the redesigned Vision, became the 1999 model year Chrysler 300M. It was released a year after the other redesigned LH cars in 1998.

Production Figures:

Eagle Vision Production Figures
	Yearly Total
1993	28,678
1994	22,064
1995	25,128
1996	12,806
1997	5,874
Total	94,550

== Awards ==
- 1993: Automobile Magazine Automobile of the Year in 1993
- 1994: Car and Driver's Ten Best List

== Nameplate use ==
In Mexico, the 2015 model of the Fiat Siena has been marketed as the Dodge Vision.
