= Chrysler LHS =

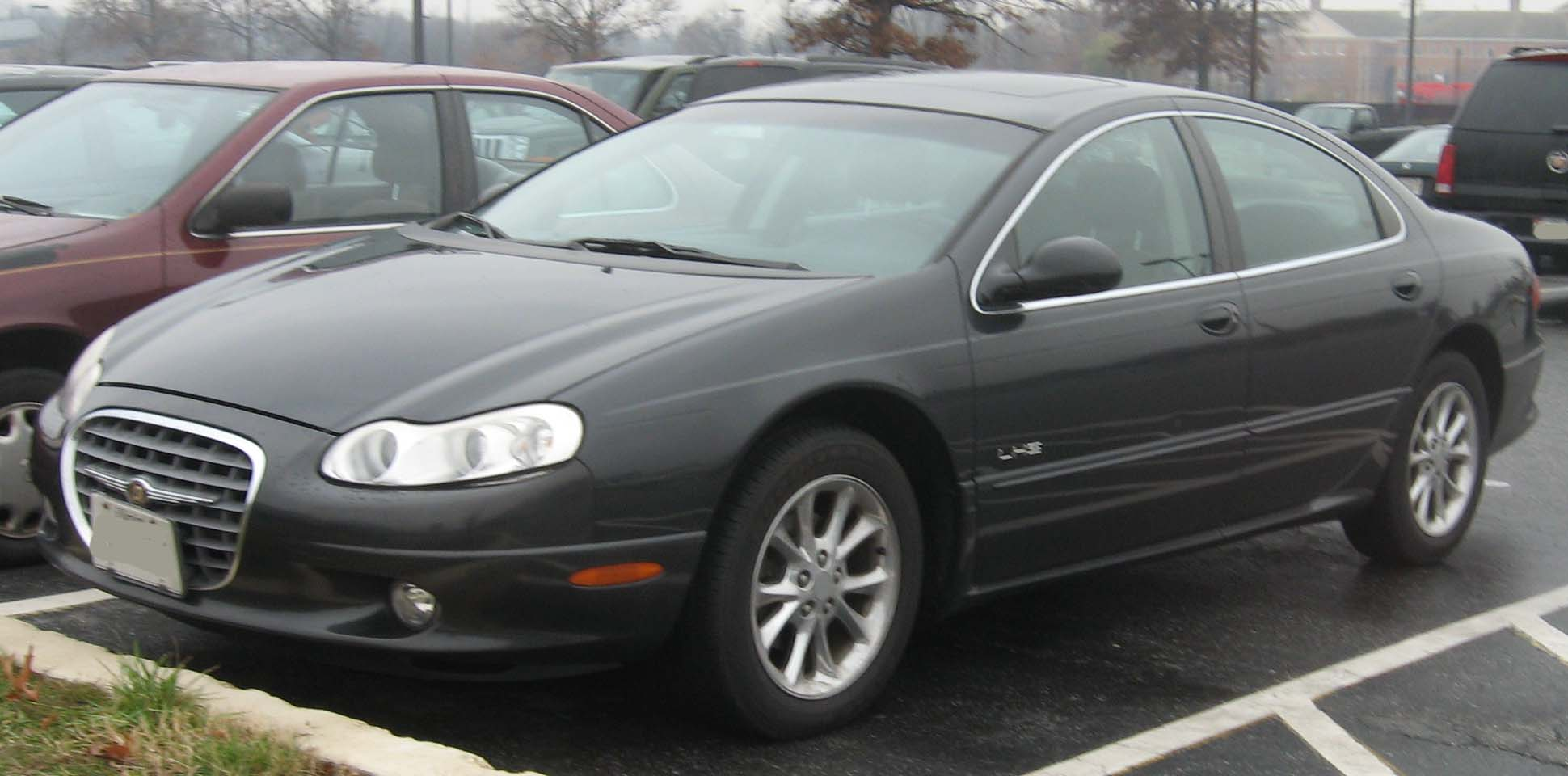
- Chrysler LHS (1999–2001)

Overview
- Manufacturer: Chrysler Corporation (1993–1997); DaimlerChrysler (1998–2001)
- Production: 1993–1997; 1998–2001
- Model years: 1994–1997; 1999–2001

Body and chassis
- Class: Full-size luxury 4-door sedan
- Layout: Longitudinal front-engine, front-wheel drive
- Platform: Chrysler LH platform

Chronology
- Predecessor: Chrysler Imperial; Chrysler Fifth Avenue
- Successor: Chrysler Concorde Limited

The Chrysler LHS is a full-size luxury four-door sedan that was produced by Chrysler for the 1994 through the 2001 model years, with a one-year hiatus for 1998. It replaced the Chrysler Imperial and the Chrysler Fifth Avenue as the division's flagship model. The LHS was rebadged as the Concorde Limited for the 2002 model year.

== First generation (1994–1997) ==
First generation
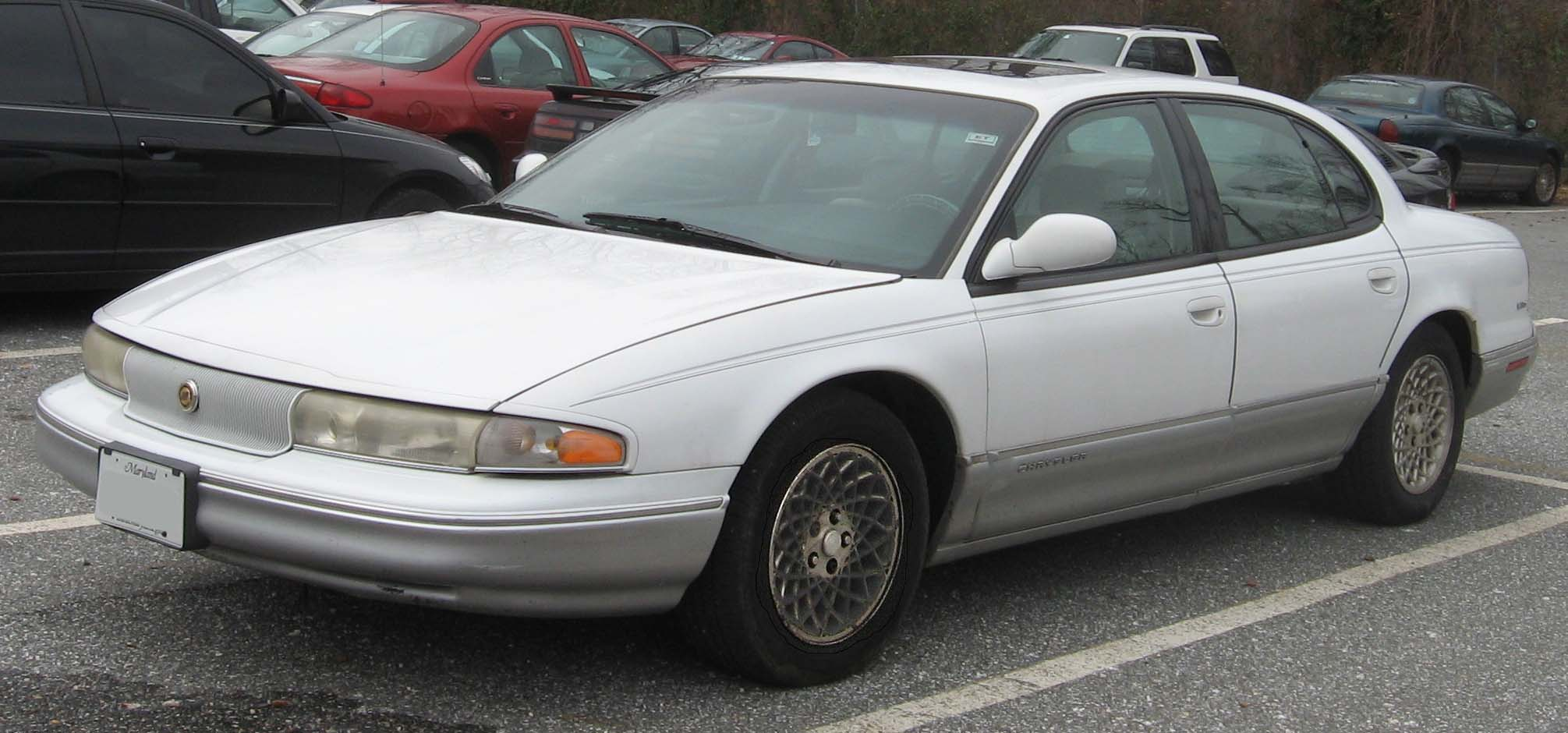

Overview
- Manufacturer: Chrysler Corporation
- Production: February 1993 – 1997
- Model years: 1994–1997
- Assembly: Canada: Brampton, Ontario (Brampton Assembly)

Body and chassis
- Related: Chrysler New Yorker; Chrysler Concorde; Eagle Vision; Dodge Intrepid

Powertrain
- Engine: 3.5 L EGE V6
- Transmission: 4-speed 42LE automatic

Dimensions
- Wheelbase: 113.0 in (2,870 mm)
- Length: 207.4 in (5,268 mm)
- Width: 74.3 in (1,887 mm)
- Height: 55.7 in (1,415 mm)

Introduced in May 1993 for the 1994 model year, the Chrysler LHS was the top of the line model for the division, as well as the most expensive of the Chrysler LH platform cars. All the LH-series models shared a 113.0-inch (2,870 mm) wheelbase and were developed using Chrysler's new computer drafting system.

The car was differentiated from the division's New Yorker sedan by its bucket leather seats (the New Yorker had a bench seat) and standard features such as alloy wheels that were options on the New Yorker. Further differences between the Chrysler LHS and its New Yorker counterpart were a floor console and shifter, five-passenger seating, lack of chrome trim, an upgraded interior, and a sportier image. From the 1996 model year on the New Yorker was dropped in favor of a six-passenger option on the LHS. The LHS received a minor face change in 1995 when the corporate-wide Pentastar emblem was replaced with the revived Chrysler brand emblem.

Standard features of the LHS included a 3.5 L EGE 24-valve 214 hp (160 kW; 217 PS) V6 engine, body-colored grille, side mirrors and trim, traction control, aluminum wheels, integrated fog lights, 8-way power-adjustable front seats, premium sound systems with amplifiers, and automatic temperature control. Unlike the New Yorker, leather seats were standard.

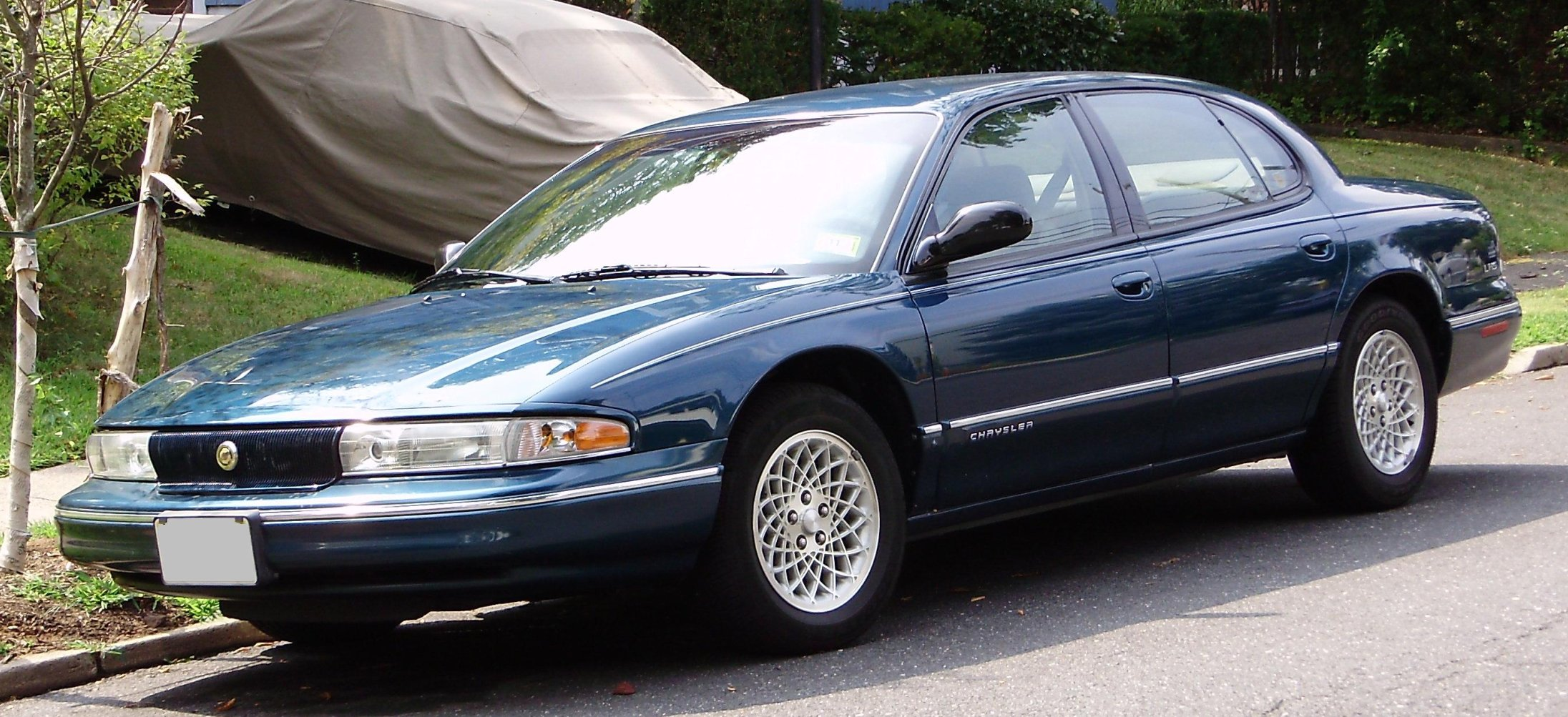
1996–1997 Chrysler LHS

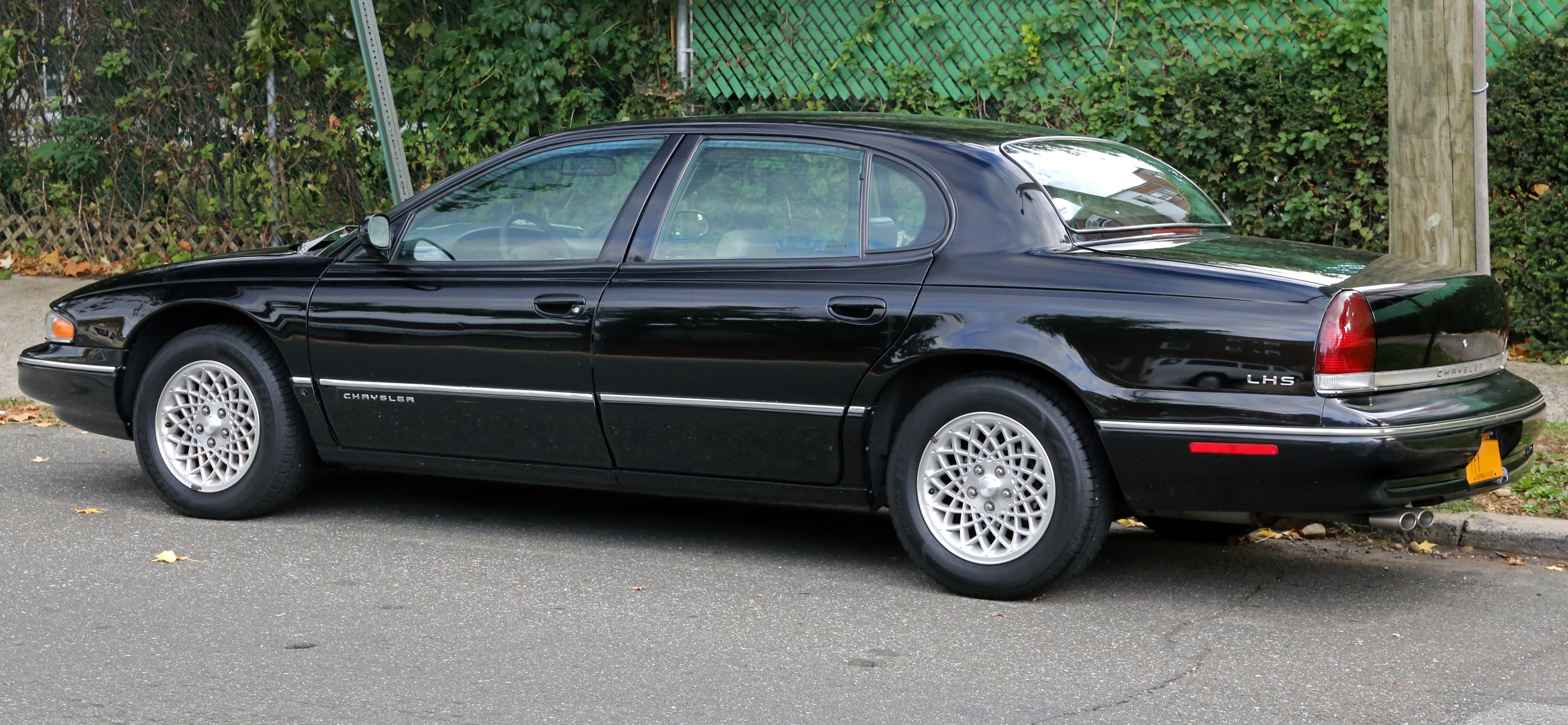
1997 Chrysler LHS

=== 1995 ===
- Due to complaints Chrysler received regarding poor brightness of the headlamps on 1994 models, they were redesigned for the 1995 model year and included a projector-style headlight beam, which was rather uncommon for its time. A new Chrysler medallion on the grille replaced the Pentastar.

=== 1996 ===
- Body-color mirrors were no longer available, as well as the optional carphone. With the withdrawal of the New Yorker, front bench seats became optional. Homelink garage door opener and a hidden antenna became standard equipment.
- OBD-II is added.
- New engine ignition-carburetion management module.
- The antenna is now hidden inside the rear brake lights.
- New colours.
- More comfortable center console.

=== 1997 ===
- Transmission improvements were the primary change for 1997.

Production figures:

Chrysler LHS production figures
	Yearly Production
1994	44,739
1995	29,418
1996	34,900
1997	36,525
Total	145,582

== Second generation (1999–2001) ==
Second generation
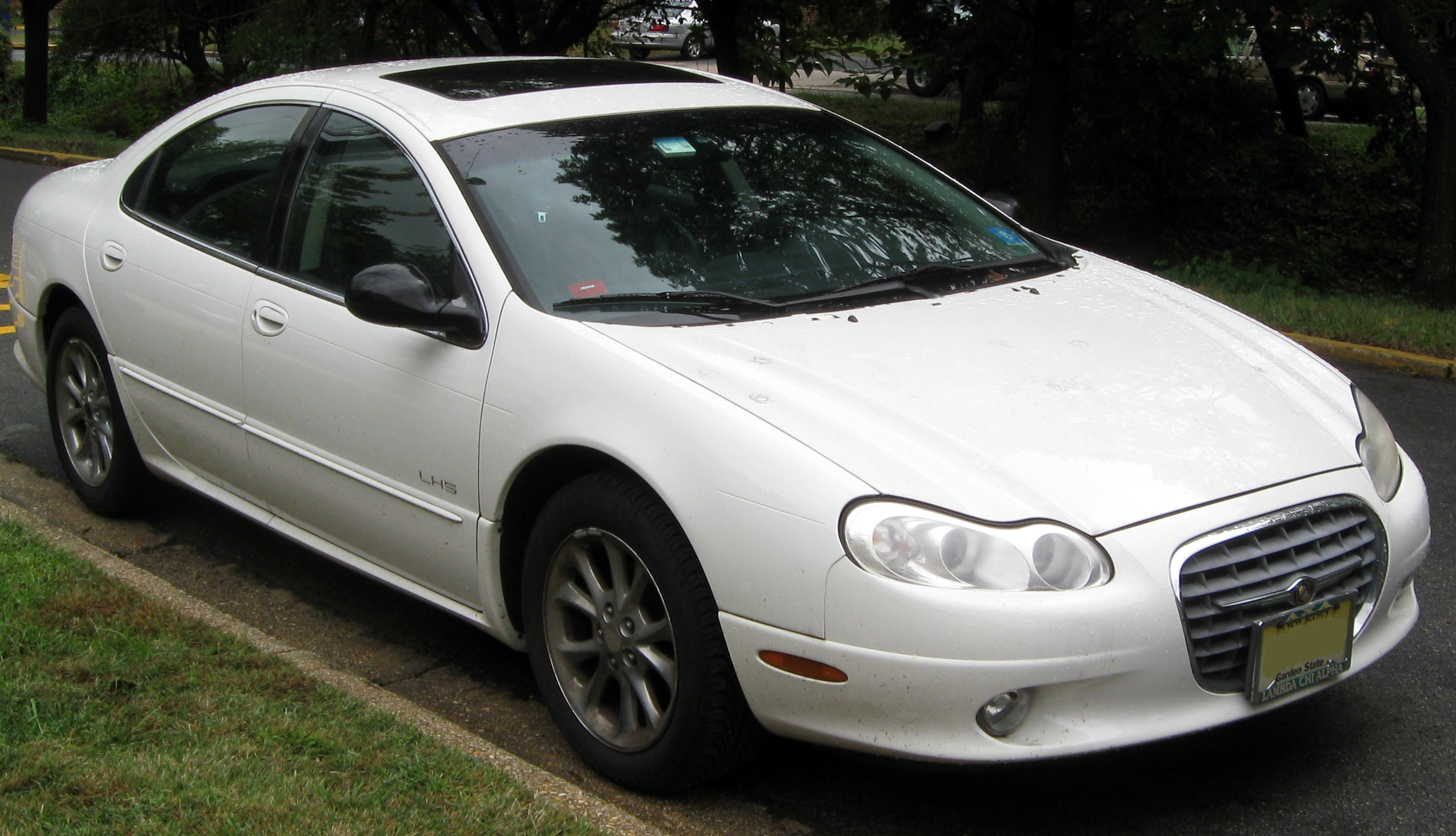

Overview
- Manufacturer: DaimlerChrysler
- Production: 1998–2001
- Model years: 1999–2001
- Assembly: Canada: Brampton, Ontario (Brampton Assembly)

Body and chassis
- Related: Chrysler Concorde; Chrysler 300M; Dodge Intrepid

Powertrain
- Engine: 3.5 L EGE V6
- Transmission: 4-speed 42LE automatic

Dimensions
- Wheelbase: 113.0 in (2,870 mm)
- Length: 207.7 in (5,276 mm)
- Width: 74.4 in (1,890 mm)
- Height: 56.0 in (1,422 mm)

After a one-year hiatus, a redesigned LHS was introduced in 1998 for the 1999 model year. It featured the new winged emblem of the Chrysler division. With the introduction of the 300M and the discontinuation of the New Yorker, the second generation LHS competed with traditional large luxury sedans while the shorter and sportier 300M competed in the performance luxury market. The new generation of the LHS was much more refined than its predecessor, and its 3.5 L SOHC 24-valve V6 produced 253 hp (189 kW; 257 PS) at 6400 rpm and 255 lb⋅ft (346 N⋅m) of torque at 3950 rpm.

Chrysler discontinued the LHS after 2001, replacing it with the new Concorde Limited. The Concorde's fascias, the primary exterior difference between the Concorde and LHS, were replaced with the LHS'. In essence, the LHS was rebadged as the Concorde Limited allowing Chrysler to streamline its model lineup.

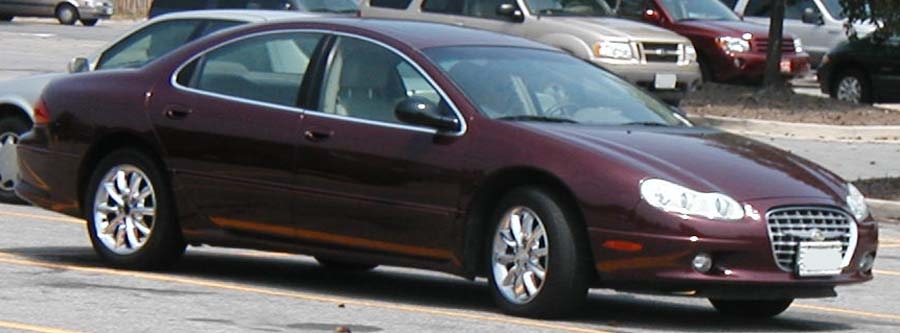
1999–2001 Chrysler LHS

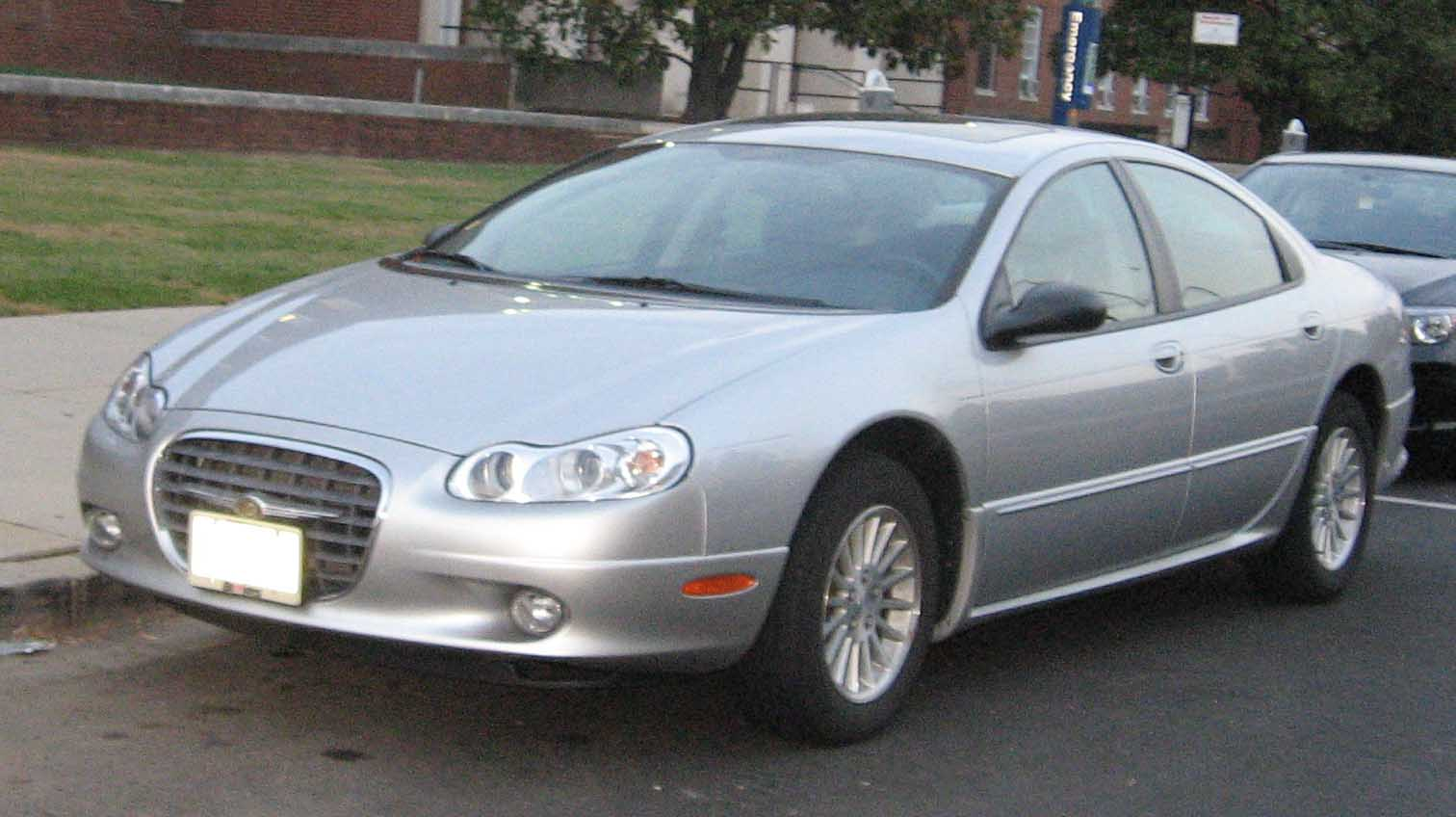
1999–2001 Chrysler LHS

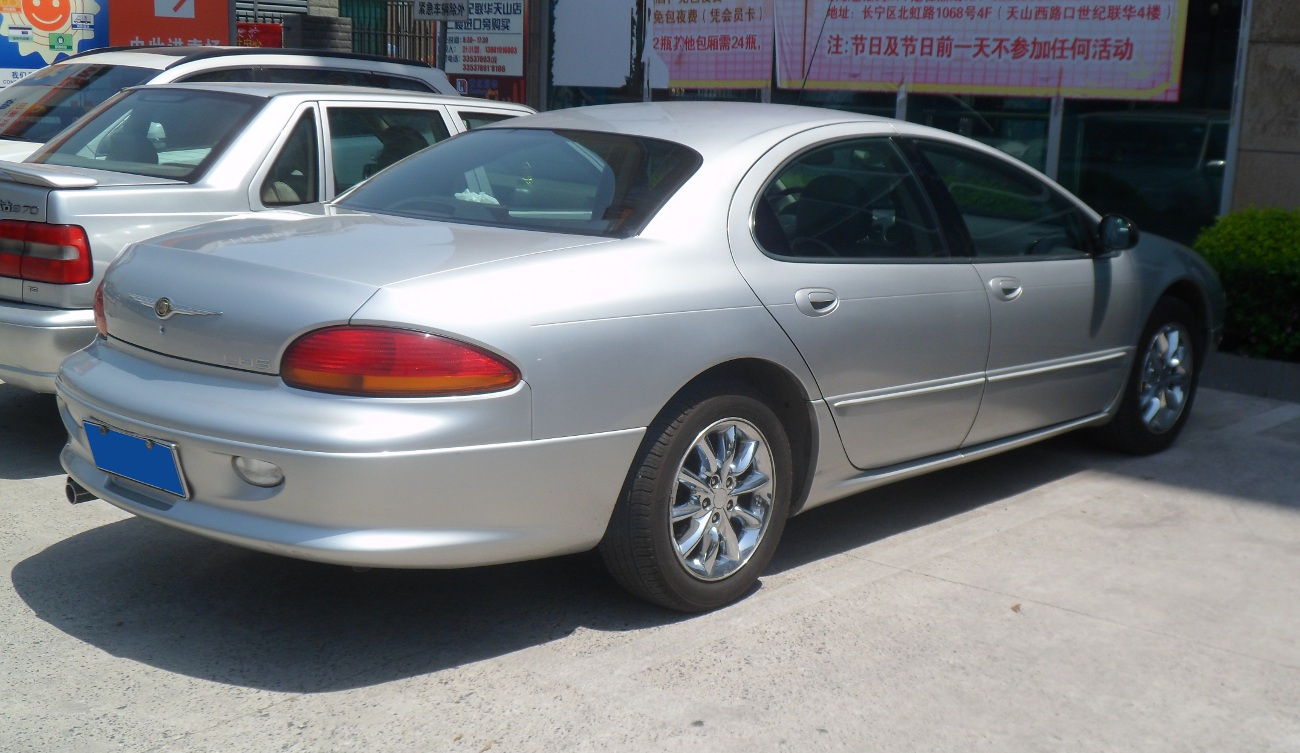
1999–2001 Chrysler LHS

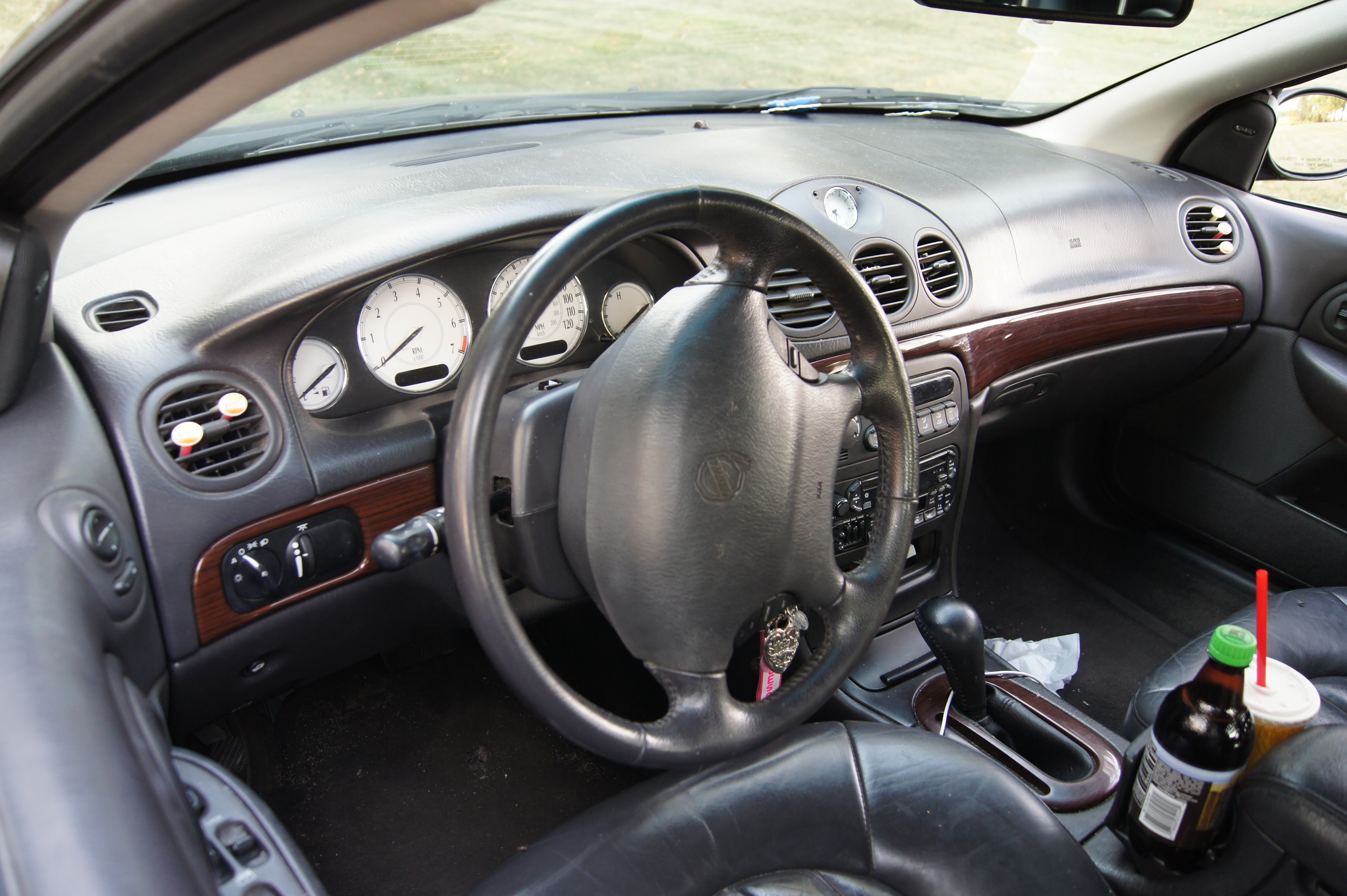
1999–2001 Chrysler LHS

== Europe ==
The first-generation LHS was sold in Europe by special order only during 1995–1999 model years. LHS was rebranded as New Yorker for the European market but retained the LHS name for the United Kingdom.

The New Yorker featured the export taillights with amber turn signal indicators in the middle band between red brake and night lights and white reverse lights, side turn signal repeaters, headlights with different light output and bulbs, and a set of red rear fog lamps in the bumpers adjacent to the wider numberplate. The side running lights and retroreflective markers were deleted from the bumpers and front turn signal indicators.

== Legacy ==
The first generation LHS was praised by motoring journalist Jeremy Clarkson, who is well known for criticising North American automobiles, described the LHS as "by global standards, right up there with the best." The LHS nameplate was discontinued after 2001, but the design continued as the Concorde Limited.
