= Chrysler SOHC V6 engine =

Chrysler SOHC V6
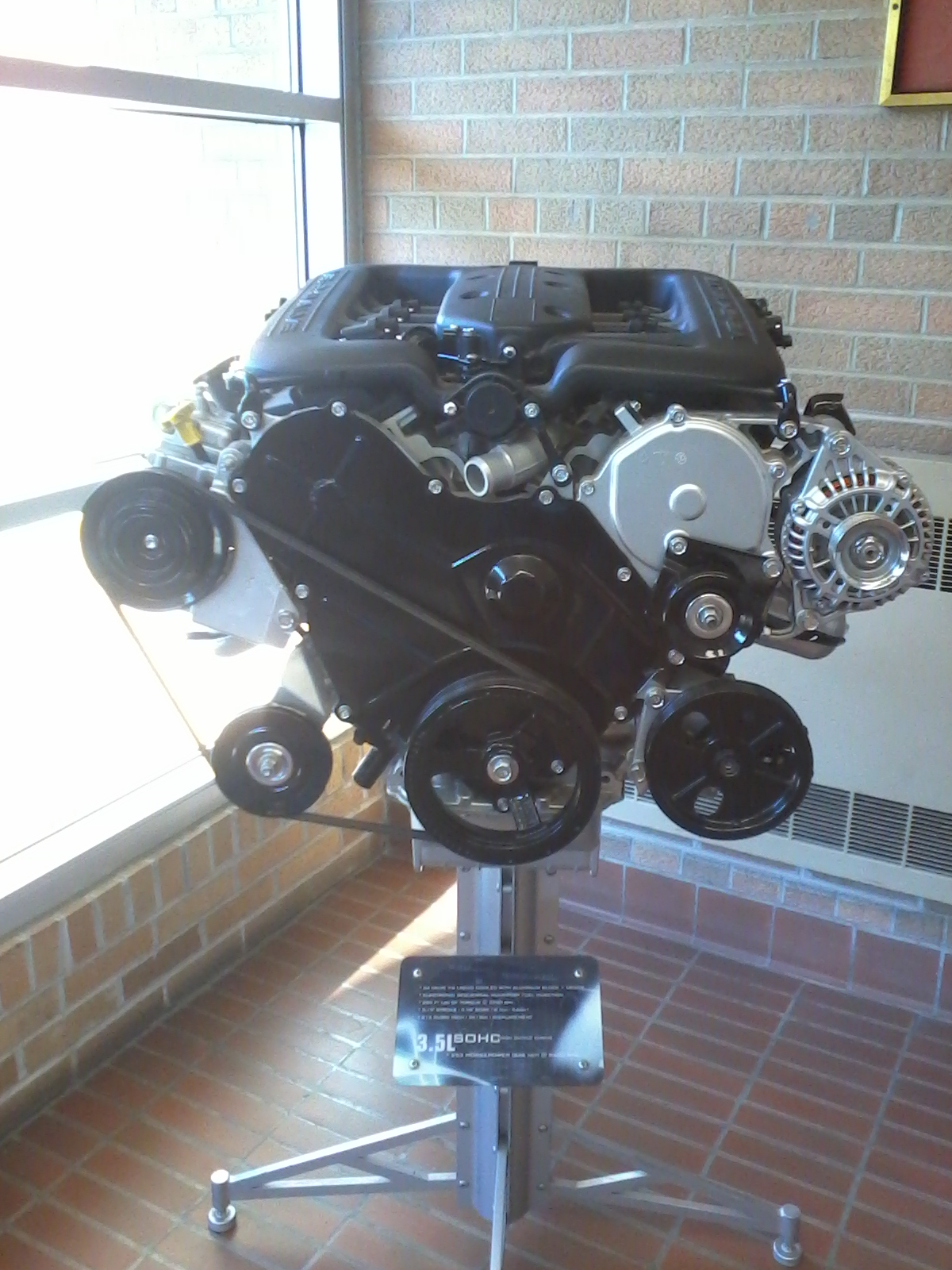
- Chrysler 3.5 L SOHC

Overview
- Manufacturer: Chrysler Corporation (1993–1998); DaimlerChrysler AG (1998–2007); Chrysler LLC (2007–2009); Chrysler Group LLC (2009–2010)
- Production: 1993–2010

Layout
- Configuration: Naturally aspirated 60° V6
- Displacement: 3.2 L; 197.2 cu in (3,231 cc); 3.5 L; 214.7 cu in (3,518 cc); 4.0 L; 241.2 cu in (3,952 cc)
- Cylinder bore: 92 mm (3.62 in); 96 mm (3.78 in)
- Piston stroke: 81 mm (3.19 in); 91 mm (3.58 in)
- Cylinder block material: Cast iron (1993–1997); Aluminum (1998–2010)
- Cylinder head material: Aluminum
- Valvetrain: Single overhead camshaft 4 valves per cyl.
- Valvetrain drive system: Timing belt
- Compression ratio: 9.5:1, 9.9:1, 10.0:1, 10.1:1, 10.3:1, 10.4:1

Combustion
- Fuel system: Sequential MPFI
- Fuel type: Gasoline
- Oil system: Wet sump
- Cooling system: Water-cooled

Output
- Power output: 214–260 hp (217–264 PS; 160–194 kW)
- Torque output: 221–265 lb⋅ft (31–37 kg⋅m; 300–359 N⋅m)

Chronology
- Predecessor: Chrysler 3.3 engine
- Successor: Chrysler Pentastar engine

The single overhead cam V6 engine introduced in 1993. It was derived from Chrysler's first homegrown front-wheel drive V6, the Chrysler 3.3 engine. The SOHC V6 has been replaced by the Chrysler Pentastar engine.

There are three major variants of this basic design: the 3.5 L, 3.2 L, and 4.0 L. Additionally, a 2.7 L DOHC version was developed.

== History ==
1993–97 3.5 L engines are a non-interference design, in which the valves will not collide with the pistons in the event of a timing belt failure. The 1998–2001 3.2 L, the 1998–2010 3.5 L, and the 2007–2011 4.0 L engines are interference designs.

=== 3.5 ===
The 3.5 L; 214.7 cu in (3,518 cc) engine was a version of the 3.3 with a larger bore of 96 mm (3.78 in) and featured overhead cams. The 3.5L version has an intake arrangement with two separate manifolds and throttle bodies connected with a crossover valve. This provides better low and midrange torque. Another difference with the 3.5 as opposed to the 3.3 is that it has a timing belt, not a timing chain. The water pump is driven by the timing belt on the 3.5, whereas on the 3.3, the accessory belt drives it.

At its debut in 1993, this engine produced 214 hp (160 kW) and 221 lb⋅ft (300 N⋅m) with an iron block and aluminium cylinder heads. The 3.5 L engine was redone entirely of aluminum in 1999 as the EGG high output, producing 247–253 hp (184–189 kW) at 6500 rpm with 250 lb⋅ft (339 N⋅m) of torque at 4000 rpm. Output from 2002 to 2004 for the standard output EGJ is 234 hp (174 kW) at 6000 rpm with 241 lb⋅ft (327 N⋅m) of torque at 4400 rpm. Also, for 2002–2004, the EGK 3.5 L Special was built exclusively for the 300M Special, producing 255 hp (190 kW) and 258 lb⋅ft (350 N⋅m). The EGK was discontinued in 2004.

The 3.5 L variant was discontinued in 2010, and was replaced by the newer Pentastar 3.6 V6.

Vehicles using the 3.5 include:
- EGE
  - 1993–1997 Dodge Intrepid
  - 1994–1996 Chrysler New Yorker
  - 1994–1997 Chrysler LHS
  - 1993–1997 Chrysler Concorde
  - 1993–1997 Eagle Vision
  - 1997 Plymouth Prowler
- EGF
  - 2007–2010 Chrysler Sebring
  - 2008–2010 Dodge Avenger
  - 2009–2010 Dodge Journey
- EGJ
  - 2002–2004 Chrysler Concorde LXi
  - 2002–2004 Dodge Intrepid ES
- EGG
  - 1999–2001 Chrysler LHS
  - 1999–2004 Chrysler 300M
  - 1999–2001 Plymouth Prowler
  - 2000–2004 Dodge Intrepid R/T and SXT
  - 2001–2002 Chrysler Prowler
  - 2002–2004 Chrysler Concorde Limited
  - 2004–2006 Chrysler Pacifica (CS)
  - 2005–2010 Chrysler 300
  - 2005–2008 Dodge Magnum SXT
  - 2006–2010 Dodge Charger
  - 2009–2010 Dodge Challenger SE
- EGK
  - 2002–2004 Chrysler 300M Special

=== 3.2 ===
The 3.2 L version debuted with the updated LH platform in 1998. It was an SOHC 4-valve design displacing 3.2 L; 197.2 cu in (3,231 cc) with a smaller 92 mm (3.62 in) bore but the same 81 mm (3.19 in) stroke as the 3.5. It produced 225 hp (168 kW) and 225 lb⋅ft (305 N⋅m) and met the TLEV emissions standard. It was discontinued at the end of the 2001 model year.

Applications:

- 1998–2001 Chrysler Concorde
- 1998–2001 Dodge Intrepid

=== 4.0 ===
The 3.5 L engine was expanded to 4.0 L; 241.2 cu in (3,952 cc) for the 2007 Dodge Nitro and Chrysler Pacifica. Like its family members, this is a SOHC engine and was built in Trenton, Michigan. DaimlerChrysler reportedly spent $155 million to expand the Trenton plant to manufacture this engine. The 4.0 L V6 Single Overhead Camshaft engine was identified by codes EGQ and EGS.

Output of 4.0 engine:

- 251 hp (187 kW) and 259 lb⋅ft (351 N⋅m) in Town & Country, Grand Caravan and VW Routan.
- 253 hp (189 kW) and 262 lb⋅ft (355 N⋅m) in Pacifica
- 260 hp (194 kW) and 265 lb⋅ft (359 N⋅m) in Nitro

Applications:

- 2007–2011 Dodge Nitro
- 2007–2008 Chrysler Pacifica (CS)
- 2008–2010 Chrysler Town & Country
- 2008–2010 Dodge Grand Caravan
- 2009–2010 Volkswagen Routan

== DOHC ==
The DOHC 2.7 L Chrysler LH engine is based on this same design, though the bore, stroke, and production site are different.

== See also ==
- List of Chrysler engines
