= Autostick =

Kind of transmission

The name Autostick has been used for a Volkswagen semi-automatic transmission, which is a vacuum-operated automatic clutch system, coupled with a conventional 3-speed manual transmission.

The "AutoStick" system designed by Chrysler allows for manual selection of gears with a standard hydraulic automatic transmission, also known as a manumatic.

The Autostick systems used by Volkswagen and Chrysler are unrelated, not mechanically similar in their operation, and do not share any similarities with their internal design and build.

The manumatic transmission systems are variously described or marketed under names that including "e-stick", "shift-command", "steptronic", and "geartronic". Manufacturers increasingly offer electronically controlled automatic transmissions that provide drivers with an ability to shift gears on their own.

The objective of these systems is to provide a sportier, more driver-focused feel. They combine the convenience of an automatic with the ability for the driver to have an increased degree of control in gear selection process. Due to modern automatic transmissions becoming almost as efficient and responsive, cars with fully manual transmissions are less in demand.

== Volkswagen Autostick ==
Marketed as the Volkswagen Automatic Stickshift, the three-speed manual transmission was connected to a vacuum-operated automatic clutch. The top of the gear shift was designed to easily depress and activate an electric switch, i.e. when engaged by the driver's hand. When pressed, the switch operated a 12-volt solenoid, in turn, operating the vacuum clutch servo, thus disengaging the clutch and allowing shifting between gears. With the driver's hand removed from the gearshift, the clutch would re-engage automatically. The transmission was also equipped with a torque converter, allowing the car to idle in gear, like an automatic. The torque converter was operated by transmission fluid. This would allow the car to stop in any gear and start from a standing stop in any gear.

The Autostick debuted on the 1968 Volkswagen Beetle and Karmann Ghia at mid-model year along with a fully-independent rear suspension that debuted in August 1968 for the 1969 model year. VW ended Autostick production with the 1976 model year.

== Chrysler AutoStick ==
Chrysler developed an automatic transmission with electronic transaxle controls in that had an Autostick mode providing more aggressive shifting between gears when there was increased throttle. "Essentially a driver-interactive automatic transmission that offers gear-shifting capability" the Jazz show car featured the new system.

Marketed for the 1996 model year, the Chrysler AutoStick, the Dodge Intrepid ES and Eagle Vision TSi were the first production automobile models in North America that came equipped with the system, the former as an option, the latter as standard. The system was standard equipment on the 1997 Plymouth Prowler and 1999 Chrysler 300M. It was added to the JA cars on the 1997 Stratus. This system was standard on 1999 to 2003 model year Dodge Grand Caravan ES, but only the front-wheel drive models since the AWD used a different TCM. Many Chrysler models were later fitted with this system, including the 300, 300C, Charger, Challenger, Sebring, PT Cruiser, Crossfire, Pacifica, Chrysler Town & Country, Dodge Avenger, Dodge Stratus R/T, Dodge Journey R/T and SXT, as well as Dodge Grand Caravan.

=== System advantages ===
- Ability to manually select gears
- Ability to start from 2nd or 3rd in inclement weather to improve traction
- Allows downshifting while coming down steep inclines to maintain speed
- Improved performance with quicker, more firm shifts
- Removes clutching with a pedal, instead it is operated by hand

=== Components and operation ===
Components of the Autostick system in the first Chrysler vehicles to have the design included a different TCM (Transmission Control Module), shift assembly utilizing a unique PRNDL design invented by Peter Gruich in 1994, and gauge cluster. The gauge cluster includes a read-out to let the driver know which gear is selected. Switching between automatic and manual transmission modes is by moving the shift lever to the bottom that then allows upshifts and downshifts by moving the lever left and right.

The system works with shifter down into a gated area on the shift assembly that allows the shifter to be pushed to the right (up-shift) or to the left (down-shift). Pushing the shifter sends a signal to the TCM to shift up, or down depending on the driver's actions. Dropping the shifter into the Autostick gate while the vehicle is moving will keep the transmission in the current automatically selected gear.

For the column-shift third- and fourth-generation Dodge Grand Caravan ES, Chrysler Town and Country 1999–2003, four-speed automatic transmission models with FWD (41TE) or AWD (41AE) transmission only. The Autostick feature is activated by moving the "PRNDL" transmission selection on the steering column clockwise past D where L is usually found. When selected the current gear ratio is not changed, the "Autostick" indicator illuminates in the instrument cluster, the numbers 3 2 1 illuminate to the right of D, and a square appears around the gear currently engaged, D 3 2 or 1. The button on the end of the handle is used to engage/disengage overdrive lockout, the same function as selecting L when not equipped with Autostick. When engaged the transmission will not enter 4th gear and downshifts to 3rd if it is in 4th gear. Specific gears are selected by an up/off/down 3 position momentary switch in the middle of the handle on the PRNDL lever, up to upshift and down to downshift. OD lockout and specific gear selection are mutually exclusive. While in OD lockout the transmission behaves as a 3-speed automatic transmission. Autostick gear selection holds a specific gear 1, 2, or 3 until another gear is selected by the up/down switch, the vehicle comes to a complete stop, and Autostick forces a shift to 1st gear, Autostick operation is canceled by selecting 4th gear, aka D, or Autostick is disengaged by moving the PRNDL.

The service manual explains that Autostick signaling is multiplexed on a single wire. The transmission control module outputs a 5v signal to the handle and monitors it for voltage drop The voltage ranges 0.3-1.6,1.6-2.8, 2.8-3.8, and 3.8-4.8 representing down, up, overdrive lockout, and all open respectively. The vehicle drops into 1st after stopping but can be launched in 1st, 2nd, or 3rd gear. The speed (or cruise) control operates only in 3rd and 4th gear while in Autostick mode and is deactivated if shifted to 2nd gear, just as it would if the driver had braked. Shifting into 4th (aka D) cancels Autostick single gear selection mode, and gears are automatically selected as usual until down or OD lockout is pressed.

=== System failsafes ===
In modern implementations, if the user does not shift while driving in the Autostick mode, the transmission will automatically up-shift at redline (the exception being the Plymouth/Chrysler Prowler which will not shift automatically at redline when in AutoStick mode) to prevent engine/transmission damage, and will not downshift into the redline. When coming to a complete stop, the system will automatically return to the first gear.
