= Chrysler Town & Country (minivan) =

American minivan model

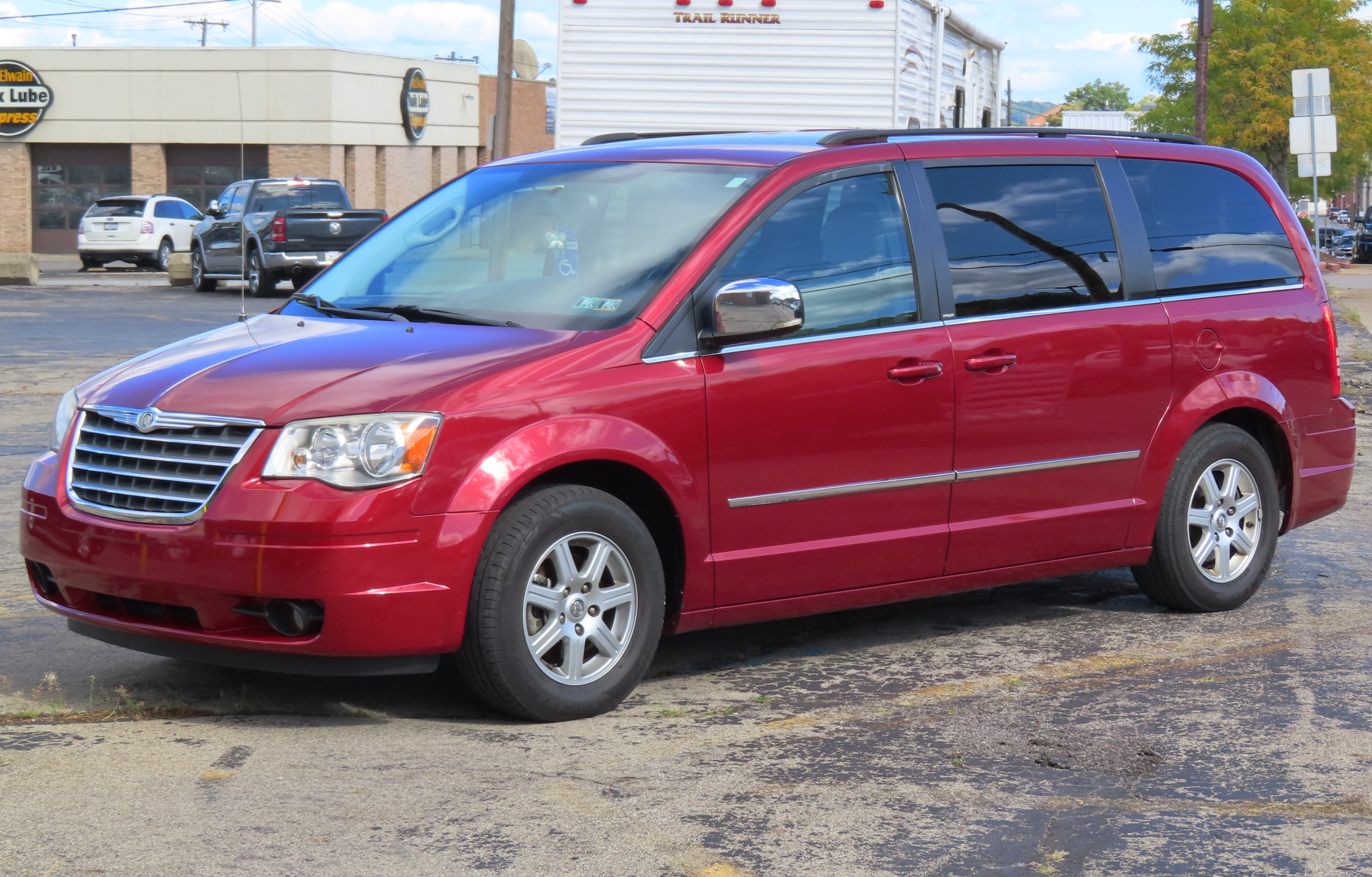
- 2010 Chrysler Town & Country Touring Plus

Overview
- Manufacturer: Chrysler Corporation (1990–1998); DaimlerChrysler (1998–2007); Chrysler LLC (2007–2009); Chrysler Group LLC (2009–2014); FCA US LLC (2014–2016)
- Production: 1989–2016
- Model years: 1990–2016

Body and chassis
- Class: Minivan

Chronology
- Predecessor: Chrysler Town & Country (1941–1988)
- Successor: Chrysler Pacifica

The Chrysler Town & Country is a minivan manufactured and marketed by Chrysler starting from the 1990 until the 2016 model year. It was the third Chrysler minivan model introduced in North America. The Town & Country adopted its nameplate from the flagship Chrysler station wagon line, adopting its exterior woodgrain trim as a design feature for several generations.

Marketed as the flagship of the Chrysler minivan line, five generations of the Town & Country were slotted above the extended-wheelbase Dodge Grand Caravan and Plymouth Grand Voyager. For 2017, Chrysler retired the nameplate, with sixth-generation Chrysler-division minivans becoming the Chrysler Pacifica. After the 2016 model year, Chrysler marked the sale of its 12 millionth minivan (under all three nameplates). Produced almost continuously for 75 years (except during World War II and 1989), the Town & Country nameplate is the longest-produced Chrysler; its longevity is second only to the Chevrolet Suburban in automotive history.

Chrysler assembled the first three generations of the model line at its Saint Louis Assembly facility in Fenton, Missouri. The fourth- and fifth-generation Town & Country models were produced by Chrysler Canada at Windsor Assembly in Windsor, Ontario.

== First generation (1990) ==
First generation
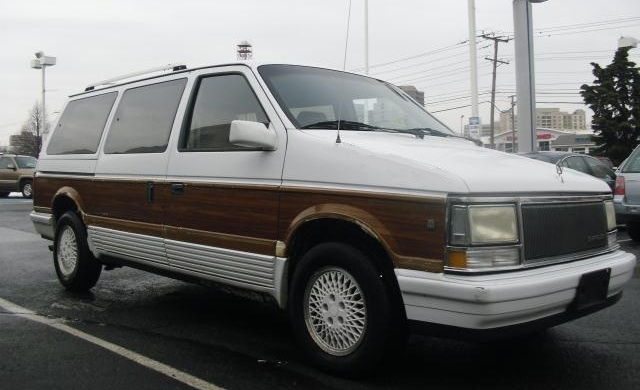

Overview
- Production: Spring 1989–1990
- Model years: 1990
- Assembly: Fenton, Missouri, United States (St. Louis North Assembly Plant)

Body and chassis
- Body style: 3-door minivan
- Layout: Transverse front-engine, front-wheel drive
- Platform: Chrysler S platform
- Related: Dodge Caravan; Plymouth Voyager; Chrysler Voyager (Europe only)

Powertrain
- Engine: 3.0 L Mitsubishi 6G72 V6; 3.3 L EGA V6
- Transmission: 4-speed A604 automatic

Dimensions
- Wheelbase: 119.1 in (3,025 mm)
- Length: 191.4 in (4,862 mm)
- Width: 72 in (1,829 mm)
- Height: 64.8 in (1,646 mm)

The Chrysler Town & Country minivan was introduced as a minivan in the spring of 1989 as an early 1990 model. Initially slated for a 1989 model-year release, the nameplate had been placed on hiatus for the first time since 1945 as Chrysler discontinued station wagon production after the 1988 model year. Having sold the line as one of its flagship vehicles (similar to the New Yorker and Imperial until the end of the 1970s), Chrysler sought to continue the name for a minivan (as the vehicles replaced full-size station wagons across multiple premium brands). Though its 1980s namesake was a station wagon counterpart of the Chrysler LeBaron sedan, a Town & Country minivan was benchmarked as the equivalent of the largest Chrysler sedans, including the 1989-1990 New Yorker Landau and Fifth Avenue.

The 1990 Chrysler Town & Country used the Chrysler S platform, sharing its bodyshell with the Dodge Grand Caravan and Plymouth Grand Voyager. Alongside its role of securing higher-profit sales, another objective behind the development of the model line (introduced roughly 18 months before the release of its successor) was to repurpose pre-manufactured long-wheelbase bodies already slated to be sold by Dodge and Plymouth. To minimize potential tooling costs for developing a distinct model, the Town & Country was distinguished from its counterparts with relatively few changes.

Initially offered solely in white, black was added as an optional color in June 1989; all versions were produced with a tan interior. Retaining its traditional exterior (simulated) wood trim (from LE-trim Voyagers/Caravans), the model line was styled with a largely monochrome exterior (with body-color bumpers and side mirrors). While the grille was explicitly designed for the Town & Country (adopting the Chrysler lettering from the export Voyager), the 15-inch wheels were shared with the Voyager LX (painted white), with the lower body cladding shared with the Caravan ES (slightly extended to compensate for the longer wheelbase). Shared with the New Yorker and Fifth Avenue, the Town & Country received a crystal Chrysler Pentastar hood ornament.

The interior was trimmed with leather seats, door panels (adopting a more contemporary design than Chrysler sedans), along with upgraded wood trim. In contrast to LE-trim Dodge and Plymouth minivans, the Town & Country was equipped with effectively every feature, including power windows and locks, seven-passenger seating, roof luggage rack, and front and rear air conditioning; the Infinity sound system was shared with the Imperial.

In total, Chrysler produced 1,789 examples in 1989 and 3,615 in 1990.

=== Engines ===
When launched, the Town & Country was originally fitted with the Mitsubishi-produced 6G72 3.0 L V6, producing 142 hp (106 kW; 144 PS); these vehicles were certified as 1989 vehicles by the Environmental Protection Agency. For 1990 production, the Chrysler-produced 3.3 L V6 replaced it, increasing output by 8 hp (6 kW; 8 PS); this engine was shared with the Dodge Dynasty, Chrysler New Yorker, and Chrysler Imperial.

Both engines were paired solely with a 4-speed "Ultradrive" automatic transmission.

- 3.0 L Mitsubishi 6G72 V6, 142 hp (106 kW; 144 PS) and 173 lb⋅ft (235 N⋅m) of torque
- 3.3 L EGA V6, 150 hp (112 kW; 152 PS) and 180 lb⋅ft (244 N⋅m) of torque

== Second generation (1990–1995) ==
Second generation
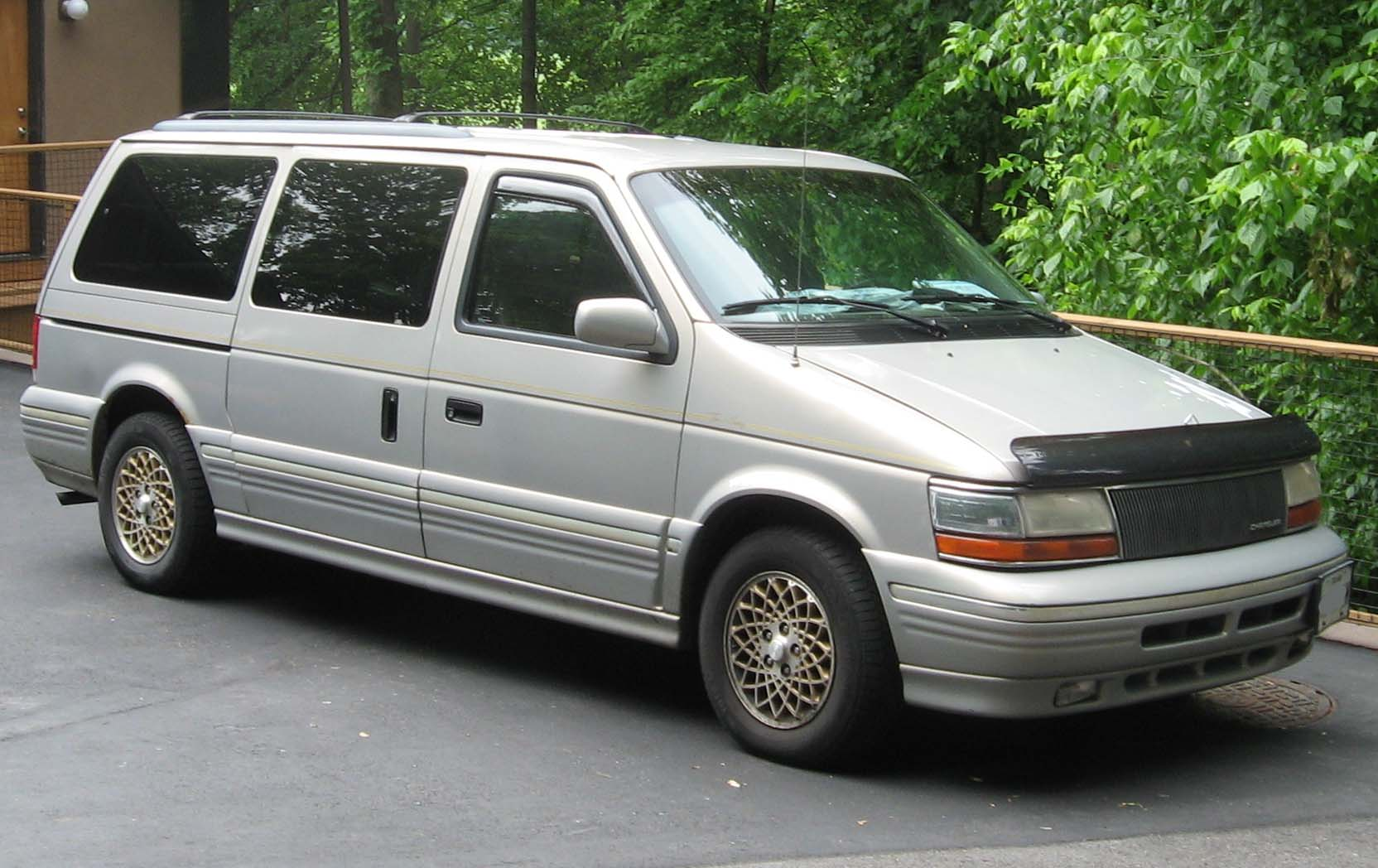

Overview
- Production: September 1990–1995
- Model years: 1991–1995
- Assembly: Fenton, Missouri, United States (St. Louis North Assembly Plant)
- Designer: Bob Hubbach (1987)

Body and chassis
- Body style: 3-door minivan
- Layout: Transverse front-engine, front-wheel drive / all-wheel drive
- Platform: Chrysler AS platform
- Related: Dodge Caravan; Plymouth Voyager; Chrysler Voyager (Europe only)

Powertrain
- Engine: 3.3 L EGA V6; 3.8 L EGH V6
- Transmission: 4-speed A604 automatic

Dimensions
- Wheelbase: 119.3 in (3,030 mm)
- Length: 192.8 in (4,897 mm)
- Width: 72 in (1,829 mm)
- Height: 64.8 in (1,646 mm) (FWD); 65.9 in (1,674 mm) (AWD)
- Curb weight: 3,955 lb (1,794 kg)

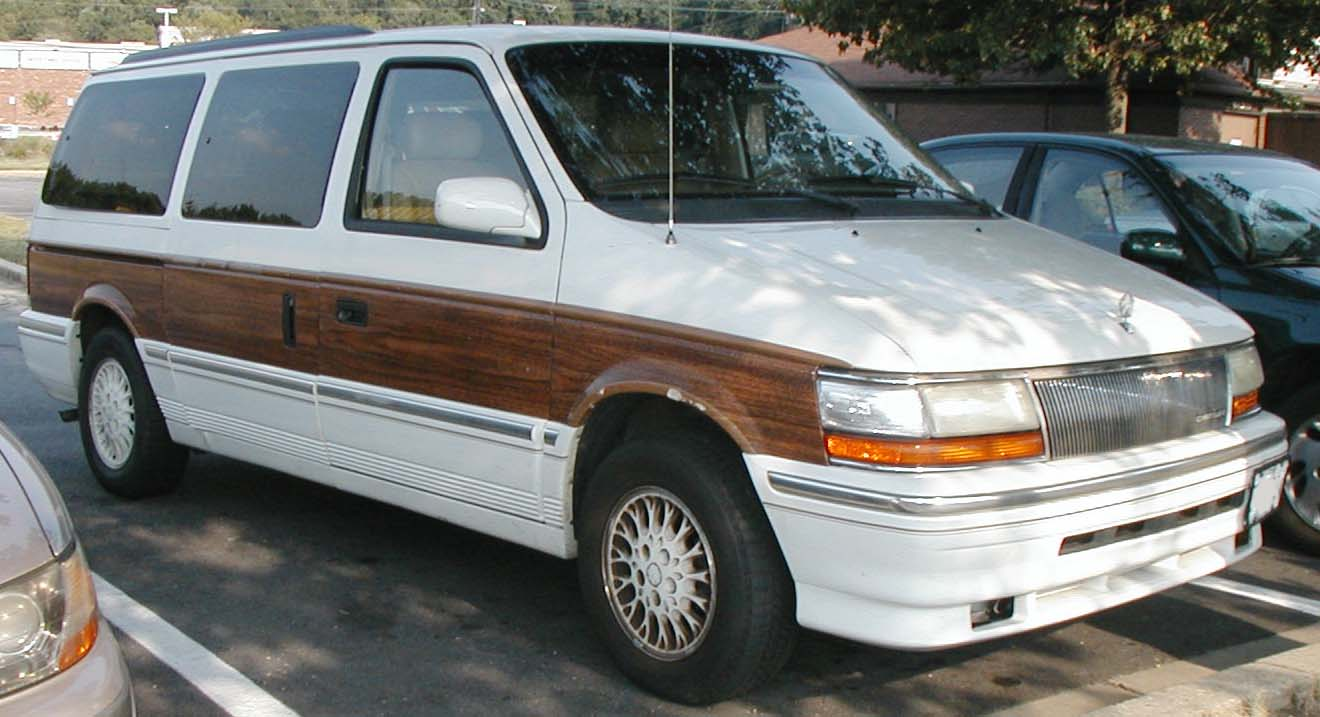
1993 Chrysler Town & Country with woodgrain appliqué

Introduced in November 1990, the second-generation Town & Country minivan adopted the Chrysler AS platform, using the 119-inch wheelbase of the Grand Caravan/Grand Voyager. Sharing only the front doors and side door with its 1990 predecessor, the chassis underwent extensive upgrades. As with the previous generation, the Town & Country was structurally unrelated with the Chrysler K-Cars (discontinued for 1991), but shared powertrain commonality with its AC/AY-platform derivatives (Chrysler New Yorker/Fifth Avenue/Imperial and Dodge Dynasty).

In contrast to the Caravan and Voyager, the Town & Country was sold in a single trim level with few distinct options; no short-wheelbase version was offered. In addition to its waterfall grille and crystal Pentastar (similar to the New Yorker), the Town & Country shared its headlights and taillight clusters with the Voyager. In line with the previous generation, the exterior was styled with monochrome paint (including matching side mirrors and body cladding) and model-specific alloy wheels. Moving beyond the limited-production status of previous generation, Chrysler offered a variety of exterior of colors, keeping the woodgrain trim standard.

The interior was fitted with standard leather trim (similar to the Chrysler Imperial), woodgrain dashboard/door trim (replacing black trim) and a standard digital instrument cluster (including a tachometer). In a change from the previous generation, the dashboard was fitted with a glovebox. The second row of seats was offered in two configurations; a bench seat was standard, with "Quad Command" second-row bucket seats offered as an option for the Town & Country (and the highest-trim Voyager/Caravan); for 1992, the latter design was made standard. Though Chrysler introduced integrated child safety seats for 1992, the feature was designed only with bench seats, precluding its fitment with the Town & Country.

Introduced as an option when the model was launched, the Town & Country (and its Caravan/Voyager counterparts) was the first minivan sold with a driver-side airbag; for 1992, the driver airbag was made standard. Though technically a light truck, the model line adopted 3-point seatbelts for each outboard seating position.

=== Engines ===
- 1991–1993: 3.3 L EGA V6, 150 hp (110 kW), 180 lb⋅ft (240 N⋅m)
- 1994–1995: 3.8 L EGH V6, 162 hp (121 kW), 213 lb⋅ft (289 N⋅m)

=== Year-to-year changes ===
- 1991: Second-generation Chrysler Town & Country minivan is introduced with improved aerodynamics, fit and finish, and upgraded interior controls. The 1991 vehicles are distinguished by door handle design (shared with the previous generation). Only year for optional airbag and standard second-row bench seat.
- 1992: Driver-side airbag and "quad command" rear seats made standard; all-wheel drive introduced as optional feature. Door handles redesigned (larger, better-integrated design). For the first time, Chrysler offers an exterior woodgrain trim delete option for the Town & Country, replaced by a monochrome exterior with a gold pinstripe; new gold-color alloy wheels were introduced.
- 1993: There were several interior revisions. On the exterior, a stainless steel exhaust system and new available wheel designs greeted buyers for 1993.
- 1994: For a mid-cycle revision, the dashboard underwent a design, introducing dual airbags; to meet 1998 side-impact standards, the front doors and sliding door were fitted with internal impact beams. Woodgrain-delete vans were fitted with body-color grilles (with some vehicles deleting all chrome). The 3.3 L V6 was replaced by a larger-displacement 3.8 L V6 (from the 5th Avenue/Imperial).
- 1995: Largely carryover in a shortened final year. The keyless-entry remote was revised for safety. To prevent an accidental opening of the rear liftgate, a user now had to press the release button within five seconds.

== Third generation (1996–2000) ==
Third generation
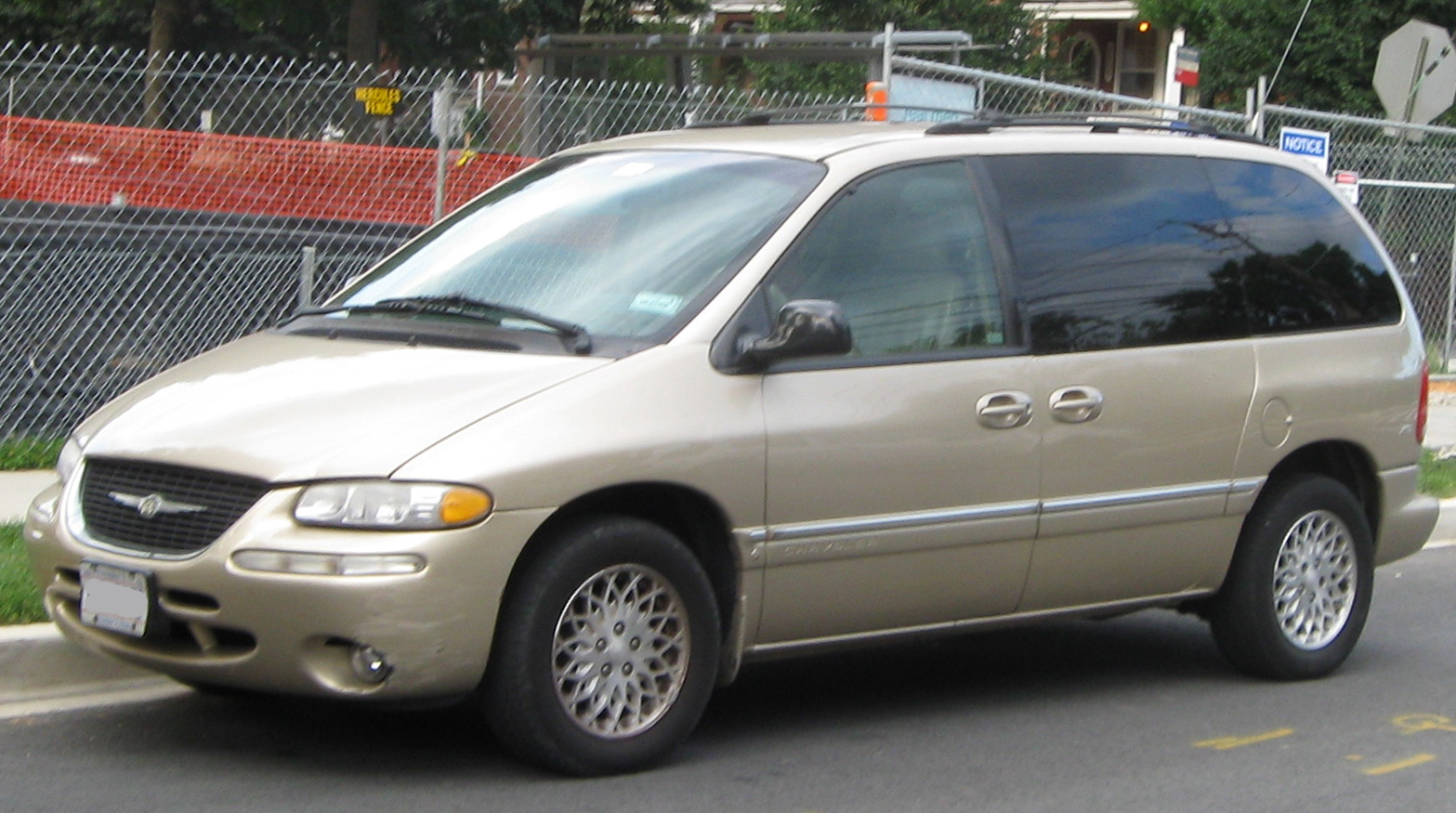

Overview
- Production: January 30, 1995–2000
- Model years: 1996–2000
- Assembly: Fenton, Missouri, United States (St. Louis South Assembly Plant)
- Designer: Don Renkert (1991)

Body and chassis
- Body style: 3-door minivan 4-door minivan
- Layout: Transverse front-engine, front-wheel drive / all-wheel drive
- Platform: Chrysler NS platform
- Related: Chrysler Voyager; Dodge Caravan; Plymouth Voyager

Powertrain
- Engine: 3.3 L EGA V6; 3.8 L EGH V6
- Transmission: 4-speed 41TE automatic

Dimensions
- Wheelbase: 113.3 in (2,878 mm) (SWB); 119.3 in (3,030 mm) (LWB)
- Length: 186.4 in (4,735 mm) (SWB); 199.7 in (5,072 mm) (LWB)
- Width: 76.8 in (1,951 mm)
- Height: 68.7 in (1,745 mm)
- Curb weight: 3,863 lb (1,752 kg); 3,951 lb (1,792 kg)

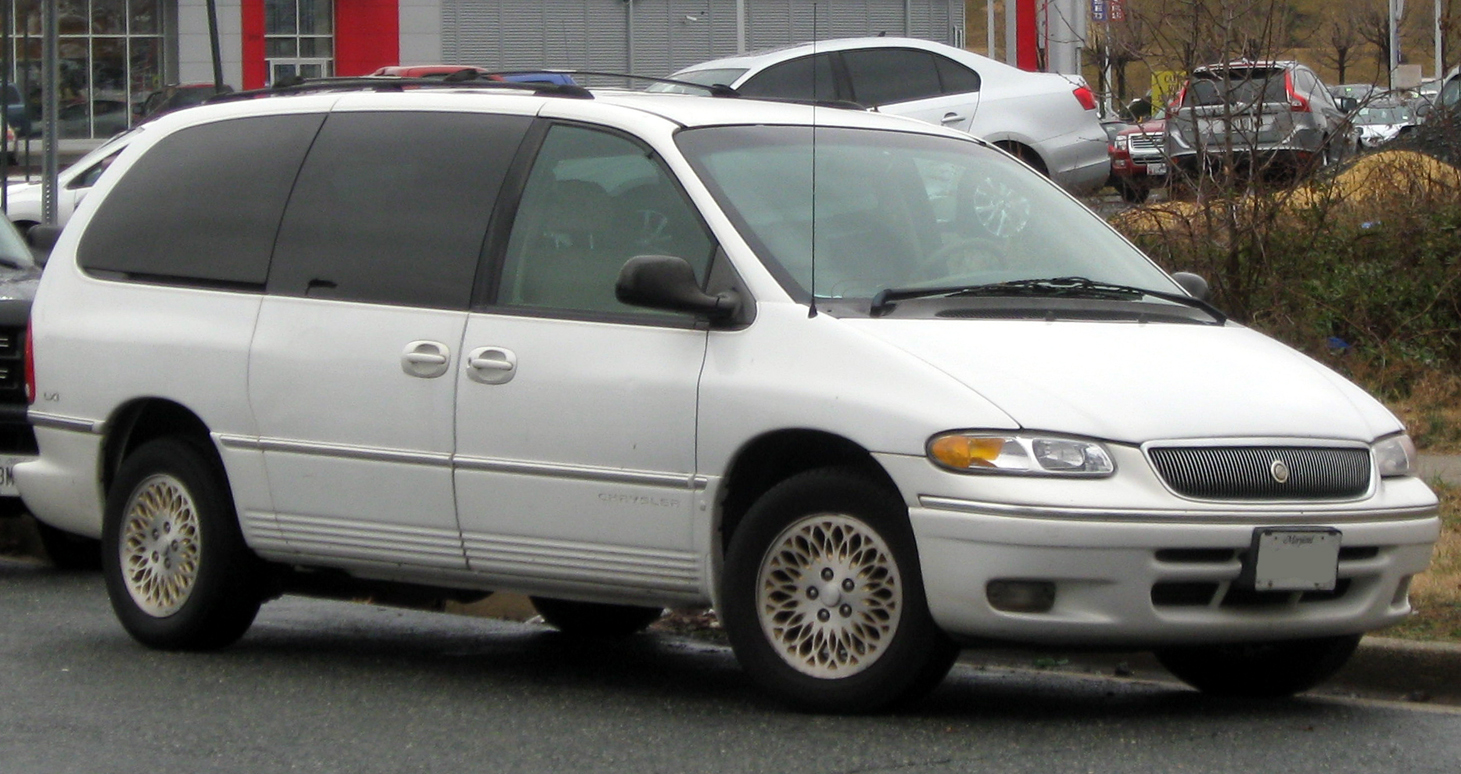
1996–1997 Chrysler Town & Country LXi LWB

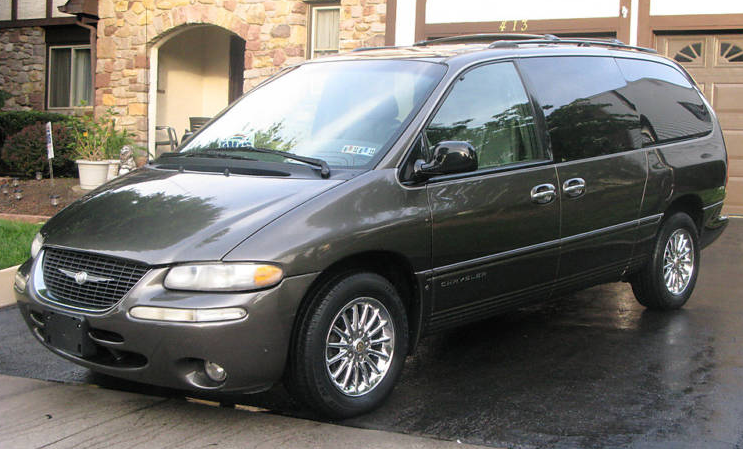
1999–2000 Chrysler Town & Country Limited

Introduced at the beginning of 1995, the third-generation Town & Country debuted the all-new Chrysler NS platform, marking the most extensive redesign of the Chrysler minivans since their 1984 release. Adopting cab-forward design to a minivan format, Chrysler sought a design that maximized interior space and visibility. Alongside its Dodge and Plymouth counterparts, the 1996 Town & Country introduced several features to the segment, including a driver-side sliding door, and rear seats mounted on deployable wheels (Easy Out Roller Seats). In a break from tradition, the 1996 Town & Country was no longer offered with simulated woodgrain exterior trim (offered either as an option or as standard since 1965). The hood ornament was deleted; in place of the crystal Pentastar, the model line debuted a grille-mounted Chrysler "blue ribbon" emblem (revived from the mid-1930s).

Sharing its bodyshell with the Caravan and Voyager, the Town & Country was styled with a largely monochrome appearance, with chrome limited to body moldings, wheels, and the grille (the only Chrysler NS minivan with a chrome grille). To match the Town & Country against smaller competitors, Chrysler introduced a version of the model line using the standard 113-inch wheelbase (non-"Grand") body. In a major change, the rear liftgate was fitted with an external release handle (unlatched separately from being unlocked).

Distinguished primarily by its woodgrain trim, the interior of the Town & Country shared its dashboard with both the Caravan and Voyager; the digital instrument cluster was retired in favor of analog instruments.

Car and Driver included the Town & Country on their Ten Best list for 1996 and 1997. In 1999, Chrysler unveiled the Pacifica, a concept minivan using the Town & Country's body shell and bearing resemblance to the Town & Country and the LHS.

=== Trim ===
For the third generation of the model line, Chrysler expanded the Town & Country several distinct trim levels. To allow Chrysler to compete against smaller minivans (including the Oldsmobile Silhouette and Mercury Villager), the company introduced a shorter-length version (adopting the body of the Caravan/Voyager, not the Grand Caravan/Grand Voyager).

For 1996, the previous-generation Town & Country was designated as the LXi trim, again featuring leather and wood interior trim, 8-way adjustable front seats. A base-trim long-wheelbase was introduced; largely replacing the Plymouth Grand Voyager LE, the model was fitted with cloth trim and standard bench seats (allowing for integrated child safety seats as an option). The short-wheelbase LX trim replaced the Plymouth Voyager LX, featuring the same feature content as the base-trim model.

For 1997, the trim range was revised, with the base LWB model becoming the LX and the previous LX renamed the SX (denoting its shorter-wheelbase status). With the exception of engines (SX and LX used a 3.3 L V6; a 3.8 L V6 for LXi, optional on AWD LX vans), the LX and SX shared optional equipment standardized on the premium LXi.

For 1999, the Limited was introduced, becoming the flagship minivan trim above the LXi. In addition to chrome wheels and door handles, the Limited was fitted with a distinct design for a third-row seat (with individual outer seatbacks).

=== Engines ===
Engines included a 3.3 L gasoline-powered engine (8th VIN digit R), a 3.3 L flexible-fuel 3.3 L engine (8th VIN digit G), and a 3.8 L engine (8th VIN digit L). In Canada, Town & Country models came standard with the 3.8 L V6 and were offered only in long-wheelbase (LWB) versions.

- 1996–2000: 3.3 L EGA V6, 158 hp (118 kW), 203 lb⋅ft (275 N⋅m)
- 1996–1997: 3.8 L EGH V6, 166 hp (124 kW), 227 lb⋅ft (308 N⋅m)
- 1998–2000: 3.8 L EGH V6, 180 hp (130 kW), 240 lb⋅ft (330 N⋅m)

=== Year-to-year changes ===
==== 1996 ====
- Third-generation Town & Country introduced, retiring woodgrain exterior trim and Pentastar hood ornament. Model line expanded into SWB LX (replacing Plymouth Voyager LX), base model (replacing Grand Voyager LE), and LXi (successor to previous Town & Country). Driver-side sliding door introduced as new optional feature, with rear bench "Easy Out Bench Seats" using deployable rollers for removal.
- Optional sliding rear passenger doors.

==== 1997 ====
- Trim revised to SWB SX, LWB LX and LXi. Driver-side sliding door made standard equipment (on Town & Country). All-wheel drive returned as an option, with front-wheel drive vehicles receiving optional low-speed traction control (standard on LXi).

==== 1998 ====
- Mid-cycle revision for exterior introduced. The new front bumper received an enlarged black eggcrate grille, with the Chrysler "blue-ribbon" badge trimmed with chrome wings; the headlamps were enlarged, paired with round foglamps. The interior underwent several revisions, including new upholstery for SX and LX trims. The dashboard was revised in design slightly, updating several HVAC vents.

==== 1999 ====
- Flagship Limited trim introduced, slotted above LXi; externally distinguished by additional chrome trim, the Limited interior is fitted with suede/leather seats and trim and a fold-down console for the third-row seat. The middle row bench seat began to be phased out in the model line; an optional integrated child seat was introduced for second-row bucket seats.

==== 2000 ====
- The short-wheelbase SX was discontinued, shifting the model line entirely to the long-wheelbase "Grand" bodyshell. Coinciding with the retirement of Plymouth during the 2000 model year, Chrysler adopted the Voyager under its own brand in the latter part of the model year, offering it only in a short-wheelbase configuration.

== Fourth generation (2001–2007) ==
Fourth generation
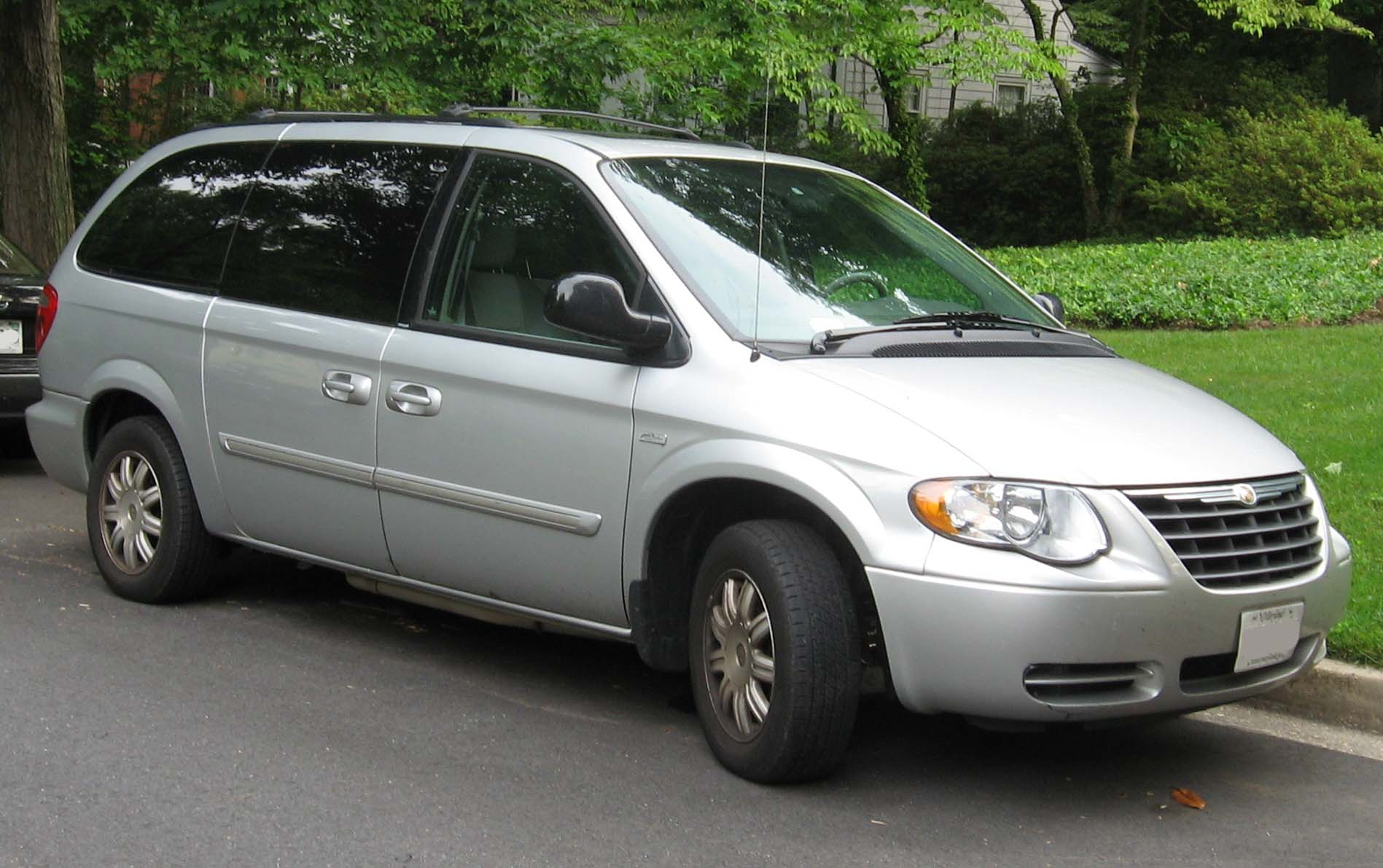

Overview
- Also called: Chrysler Voyager (Europe and SWB from 2001–2004); Chrysler Grand Voyager (Europe LWB)
- Production: 2000 – July 2007
- Model years: 2001–2007
- Assembly: Windsor, Ontario, Canada (Windsor Assembly; LWB); St. Louis, Missouri, United States (St. Louis South Assembly Plant; SWB); Fujian, China; Yangmei, Taoyuan, Taiwan
- Designer: Brandon Faurote (1997)

Body and chassis
- Body style: 4-door minivan
- Layout: Transverse front-engine, front-wheel drive / all-wheel drive
- Platform: Chrysler RS platform
- Related: Chrysler Pacifica; Chrysler Voyager (USA, 2001–2003); Dodge Caravan

Powertrain
- Engine: 3.3 L EGA V6; 3.8 L EGH V6
- Transmission: 4-speed 40TE automatic 4-speed 41TE automatic

Dimensions
- Wheelbase: 113.3 in (2,878 mm) (SWB); 119.3 in (3,030 mm) (LWB)
- Length: 189.3 in (4,808 mm) (SWB); 200.5 in (5,093 mm) (LWB); 200.6 in (5,095 mm) (2001–04 LWB)
- Width: 78.6 in (1,996 mm)
- Height: 68.8 in (1,748 mm) (SWB); 68.9 in (1,750 mm) (LWB)
- Curb weight: 3,899 lb (1,769 kg); 4,239 lb (1,923 kg)

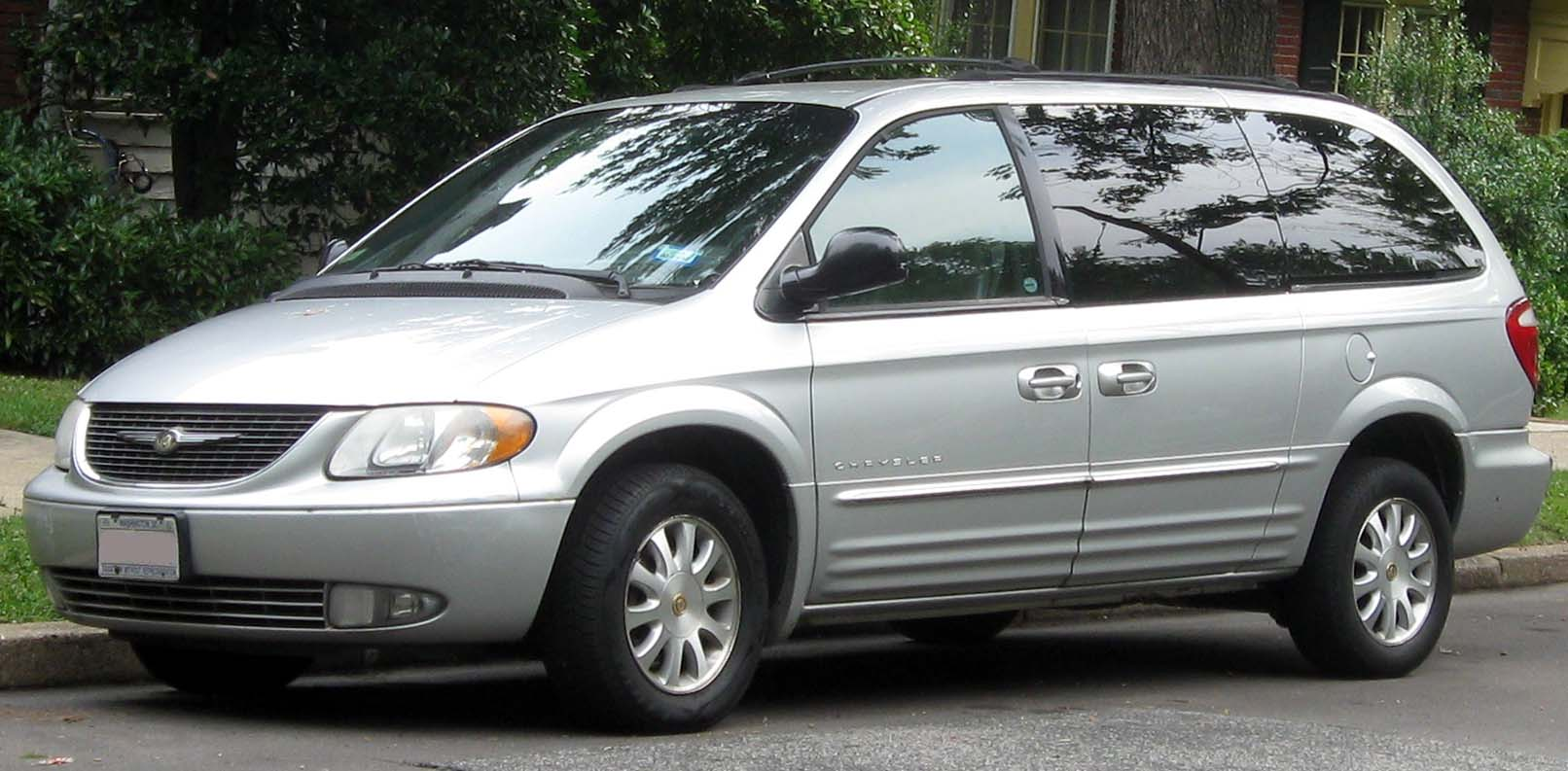
2001–2004 Chrysler Town & Country LXi LWB

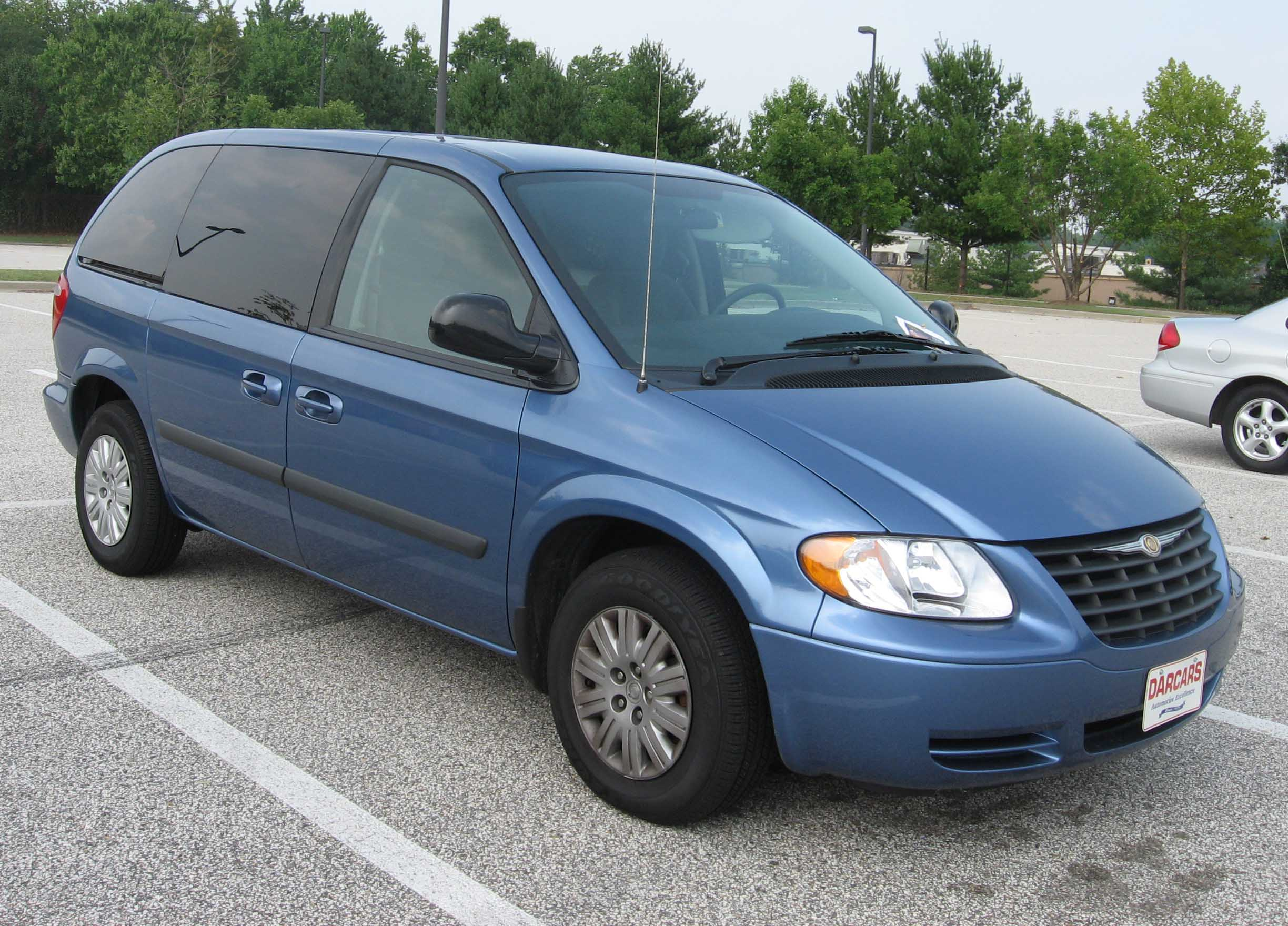
2005 Chrysler Town & Country SWB

The fourth-generation Town & Country went on sale in January 2000 as a 2001 model. It was redesigned using the Chrysler RS platform and initially available only in long-wheelbase (LWB) form.

Chrysler's short-wheelbase minivan was marketed using the Voyager nameplate, which had been transferred to the Chrysler line in mid-2000 when the Plymouth brand was discontinued. After 2003, the Voyager nameplate was dropped and the short-wheelbase (SWB) versions were once again part of the Town & Country lineup.

Trim levels for 2001 were carried over from the previous generation. They included the entry-level LX, mid-level LXi, and the range-topping Limited. By 2002, extra feature packed eL and eX models were added. These were value-priced versions of the LX and LXi, respectively, that included the most popular option packages.

The 2004 model year included a new unnamed base short-wheelbase model. The LX, LXi, and Limited were the Canadian trim levels, but only the LXi and Limited were sold to retail consumers. The lowest level LX was restricted to fleet sales.

The 2005 Town & Country received a mid-cycle refresh including revised exterior styling and a mildly restyled interior. The most significant change was the introduction of Stow 'n Go, a system of second and third-row seating that folded completely into under-floor compartments. The redesigned second- and third-row seats also meant the elimination of the all-wheel drive system. The Stow 'n Go system was prominently featured in this model's marketing campaign.

For the remainder of this generation, the Town & Country was available in the short-wheelbase base model, and long-wheelbase LX, Touring, and Limited models. As with the pre-refresh model, only the Touring and Limited were sold to consumers in Canada, the LX being restricted to fleets.

A driver's side knee airbag was now standard on all models. The front seat-mounted side airbags of previous years were discontinued in favor of side-curtain airbags for all three rows. These were standard on Limited trim and optional on all other models, however could not be ordered with the moonroof option. Uconnect Bluetooth phone pairing was now available, as well as an overhead rail storage system with three moveable or removable compartments.

=== Engines ===
Years	Engine	Power	Torque
2000–2007	3.3 L (3301 cc, 201.5 cu in) EGA V6	180 hp (130 kW) at 5000 rpm	210 lb⋅ft (285 N⋅m) at 4000 rpm
2000–2007	3.8 L (3778 cc, 230.5 cu in) EGH V6	215 hp (160 kW) at 5200 rpm	245 lb⋅ft (332 N⋅m) at 4000 rpm

Some Town & Country models with the 3.33 L V6 from 1998 until 2003, and all models with the 3.33 L V6 from 2004 through 2007 can use E85 fuel.

=== Safety ===
The fourth-generation Town & Country (Grand Voyager, as it is known in Europe) right hand drive (RHD) version performed very poorly in the Euro NCAP car safety tests, and achieved the following ratings:

Adult Occupant:	1.5/5 stars
Child Occupant:	4/5 stars
Pedestrian:	0/4 stars

In the tests, the LHD car performed significantly better than the RHD car in the frontal impact, scoring 9 points, giving a potential four star adult occupant rating." Thatcham's New Car Whiplash Ratings (NCWR) organization tested the fourth-generation European Grand Voyager for its ability to protect occupants against whiplash injuries, with the car achieving an "Acceptable" rating overall.

=== Security ===
The Grand Voyager was tested by Thatcham's New Vehicle Security Ratings (NVSR) organization and achieved the following ratings:

Theft Of:	4/5 stars
Theft From:	2/5 stars

== Fifth generation (2008–2016) ==
Fifth generation
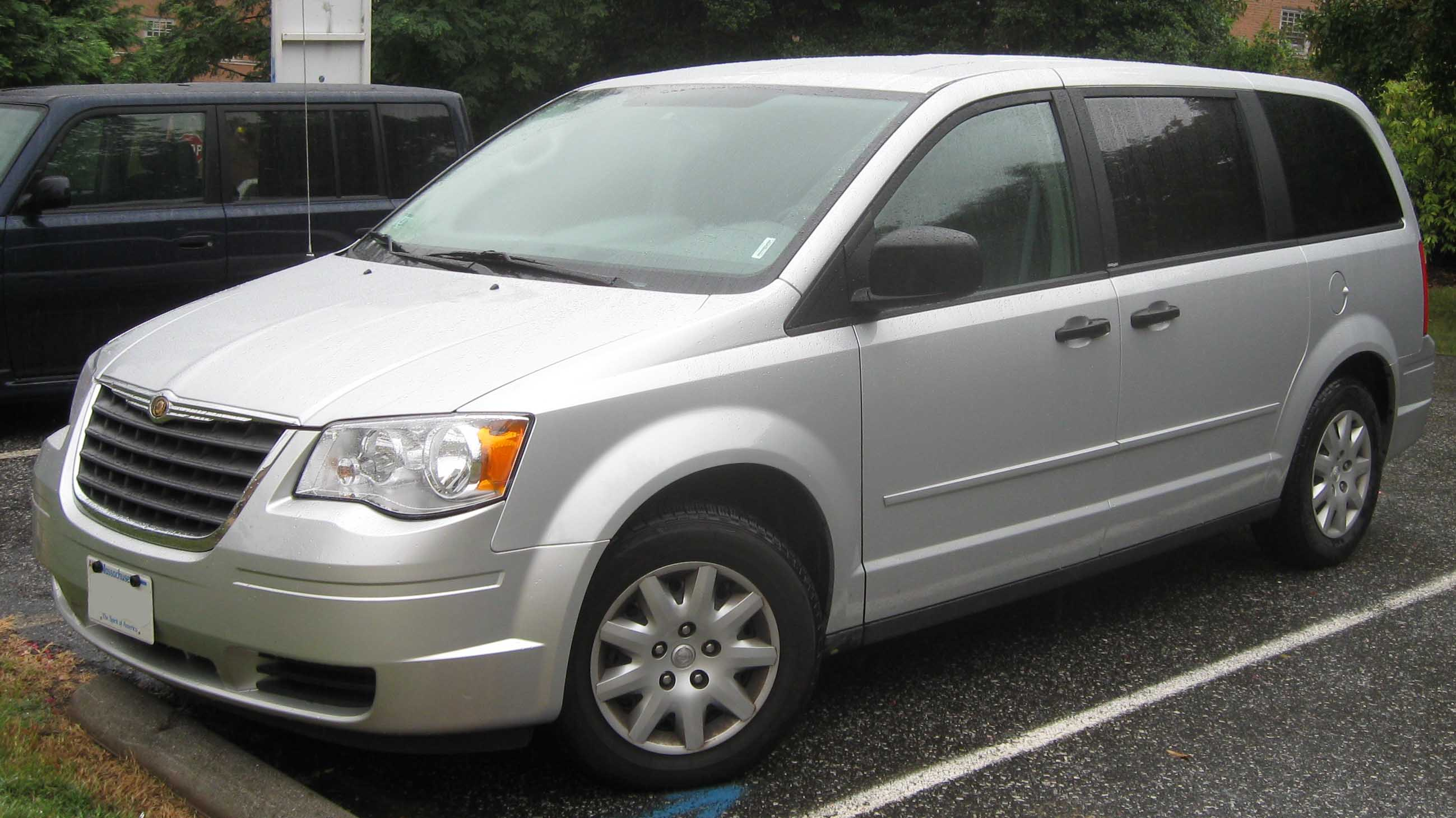

Overview
- Also called: Lancia Voyager/Grand Voyager (Europe); Chrysler Grand Voyager (Europe: 2008–2010; Australia, South Africa, Middle East: 2008–2016; UK, Ireland, Argentina and Brazil: 2008–2016; Asia and Russia: 2011–2016)
- Production: 2007–2016
- Model years: 2008–2016
- Assembly: Windsor, Ontario, Canada (Windsor Assembly); St. Louis, Missouri, United States (2007–2008)
- Designer: Ralph Gilles

Body and chassis
- Body style: 4-door minivan
- Layout: Transverse front-engine, front-wheel drive
- Platform: Chrysler RT platform
- Related: Dodge Grand Caravan; Chrysler Grand Voyager; Volkswagen Routan

Powertrain
- Engine: 3.3 L EGA V6; 3.8 L EGH V6; 4.0 L SOHC V6; 3.6 L "Pentastar" VVT V6 (2011–); 2.8 L CRD diesel (Europe and Philippines)
- Transmission: 4-speed automatic 6-speed automatic

Dimensions
- Wheelbase: 121.2 in (3,078 mm)
- Length: 202.5 in (5,144 mm)
- Width: 78.7 in (1,999 mm)
- Height: 68.9 in (1,750 mm)

=== 2008 model year ===
The fifth-generation Town & Country went on sale on August 16, 2007, as a 2008 model. The short-wheelbase model was discontinued.

The minivans featured styling by Ralph Gilles, a six-speed automatic, a new 4.0 L V6 engine as standard on the Limited model, and a system of second row seats that swiveled to face the third row, marketed as Swivel 'n Go seating. A small table, which stored in the bins below the floor, could be positioned between the two rear rows when they were facing each other. Much like its competitors, the Toyota Sienna and Honda Odyssey, the Town & Country now featured power windows on the sliding doors and moved the gear shift from the steering column to the center console, in a higher position. Another new feature of this generation was an available rear overhead console which featured LED map lights as well as halo ambient lighting. A new DVD system was also available, which featured dual screens for the rear passengers. Sirius Backseat TV was also offered, which featured three channels of children's programming (Nickelodeon, Disney Channel, and Cartoon Network).

A version of this vehicle is sold in several export markets (Australia/South Africa/Middle East/China/Singapore/Russia) as the Chrysler Grand Voyager. In Continental Europe, it was rebadged as the Lancia Voyager from the 2011 model year onwards; it had been sold as a Chrysler before 2011. Since 1991, the model has been sold in the Philippines under the Town and Country nameplate. In the Philippine market, the powertrain options are identical to those of the European Grand Voyager with a 2.8 L turbodiesel I4 as standard and an optional gasoline V6 (initially the 3.8 L "EGH", later upgraded to the 3.6).

Both engines were mated to a 6-speed automatic transmission.

Production at the St. Louis plant ended in late 2008 in a bid to save money, but continued at Windsor Assembly in Ontario, Canada.

=== Trim levels ===
The Town & Country was offered in many distinct trim levels:

The LX, from 2008 to 2010, served as the "base" Town & Country trim level. Standard features included a 3.3 L V6 engine, a 4-speed automatic transmission, an AM/FM stereo with CD player and a 4-speaker sound system, 16-inch black-painted steel wheels with plastic wheel covers, stain-repellent cloth seating surfaces, keyless entry, wood interior trim accents, carpeted floor mats, and Chrysler's Stow 'n Go fold-in-floor seating system. The trim level, which was discontinued after 2010, was reintroduced for 2015, once again as the "base" Town & Country trim level. For 2015, it included a 3.6 L "Pentastar" VVT V6 engine, a 6-speed automatic transmission, seventeen-inch alloy wheels, leather-trimmed seating surfaces, a touch-screen sound system, a 6-speaker sound system, power-sliding rear doors and a power tailgate, a rear-seat DVD entertainment system, and a security system.

The Touring had been the "midrange" Town & Country trim level since 2008. From 2008 to 2010, it added the following equipment to the base LX trim level: a 3.8 L V6 engine, sixteen-inch alloy wheels, an AM/FM stereo with CD/MP3 player and a 6-speaker sound system, a security system, second-row bucket seats, power-sliding rear doors and a power tailgate, and power second-row windows and third-row vent windows. Since 2011, it has included the following features (it was the "base" trim level from 2011 until 2014): a 3.6 L "Pentastar" VVT V6 engine, a 6-speed automatic transmission, leather-trimmed seating surfaces, a touch-screen sound system, power-sliding rear doors and a power tailgate, power second-row windows and third-row vent windows, and a rear-seat DVD entertainment system.

The S was the "sporty" Town & Country trim level from 2014 onwards. It added dark-finished alloy wheels, a darkened front grille, darkened front headlamps, and unique leather-trimmed seating surfaces to the midrange Touring trim level.

The Touring L was the "upgraded" Town & Country trim level from 2012 onwards. It adds heated front bucket seats, a third-row DVD entertainment system screen, and upgraded 18-inch alloy wheels to the midrange Touring trim level.

The Limited was the top-of-the-line Town & Country trim level from 2008 to 2014. From 2008 to 2010, it added the following features to the midrange Touring trim level: a 4.0 L V6 engine, a 6-speed automatic transmission, a touchscreen sound system with rear DVD entertainment system, leather-trimmed seating surfaces, a 9-speaker premium 506-watt surround-sound system with external amplifier and subwoofer, and chrome wheels. From 2011 through 2014, it added the following features to the midrange Touring trim level: a 9-speaker premium 506-watt surround-sound system with external amplifier and subwoofer, and upgraded interior trim. In 2015, the Limited Platinum replaced the Limited as the top-of-the-line Town & Country trim level, and the standard upgraded premium surround-sound system was dropped from the standard equipment list. Also included was the elimination of the front and rear fender chrome bars; now it just had the moldings for them. They would be removed for 2011, streamlining the look of the body.

The Limited Platinum has been the top-of-the-line Town & Country trim level since 2015. It adds the following features to the Limited trim level: special alloy wheels, upgraded interior trim, and a 9-speaker premium 506-watt surround-sound system with external amplifier and subwoofer.

For 2014, a 30th Anniversary Edition Town & Country was available to celebrate the minivan's 30th anniversary (Chrysler invented the term "minivan" in 1984, and the 2014 Dodge Grand Caravan also received special treatment). It added special alloy wheels, special interior trim, and special "30th Anniversary" emblems to the exterior of the van. For 2016, a 90th Anniversary Edition Town & Country was available to celebrate Chrysler's 90th anniversary. It added special interior trim and special "90th Anniversary Edition" emblems to the exterior of the van.

==== Engines ====
Model	Displacement	Type	Valves	Power at rpm	Torque at rpm	Compression Ratio	Transmission	Fuel economy (MPG)	Years
3.3 L V6	3,301 cc (201.4 cu in)	OHV	12	175 hp (130 kW) at 5,000	205 lb⋅ft (278 N⋅m) at 4,000	9.3:1	4-speed automatic	17/24	2008–2010
3.6 L V6	3,600 cc (220 cu in)	DOHC	24	283 hp (211 kW) at 6,400	260 lb⋅ft (353 N⋅m) at 4,400	10.0:1	6-speed 62TE automatic	17/25	2011–2016
3.8 L V6	3,778 cc (230.5 cu in)	OHV	12	197 hp (147 kW) at 5,200	230 lb⋅ft (312 N⋅m) at 4,000	9.6:1	6-speed 62TE automatic	16/23	2008–2010
4.0 L V6	3,952 cc (241.2 cu in)	SOHC	24	251 hp (187 kW) at 6,000	259 lb⋅ft (351 N⋅m) at 4,100	10.2:1	6-speed 62TE automatic	16/23 (08), 17/25 (09,10)	2008–2010

Both the 3.8 L and 4.0 L engines were paired with Chrysler's 62TE 6-speed automatic transmission with variable line pressure (VLP) technology (See Ultradrive#62TE). This transmission is standard with the new (2011 on) 3.6 L V6 engine.

==== Safety ====
In the National Highway Traffic Safety Administration (NHTSA)'s New Car Assessment Program crash testing, the 2010 Chrysler Town & Country achieved a five-star (top safety) rating in several categories.

Frontal Impact – Driver and Passenger:	5/5 stars
Side Impact Driver:	5/5 stars
Side Impact Rear Passenger:	5/5 stars
Rollover:	4/5 stars

IIHS:
Moderate overlap frontal offset	Good
Small overlap frontal offset	Poor
Side impact	Good
Roof strength (2012–present models)	Good
Head restraints & seats	Good

==== Environmental impact ====
The 2.8 L CRD 163 hp (122 kW; 165 PS) with six-speed automatic transmission was tested by EcoTest and was given a rating of 45 out of 100 for environmental friendliness and star rating.

==== Volkswagen Routan ====
Beginning with the fifth generation, Volkswagen began marketing the Routan, a rebadged variant of the Chrysler RT platform minivan with revised styling and content, for the Canadian, American, and Mexican markets. The Routan, manufactured at Windsor Assembly alongside the Grand Caravan, debuted in 2008 at the Chicago Auto Show, with sales beginning in fall 2008. It features neither Chrysler's Stow 'n Go nor Swivel 'n Go seating systems, but features the Easy Out Roller Seats.

==== 2010 recall ====
On June 3, 2010, Chrysler recalled 284,831 2008 and 2009 Town & Country vehicles due to an improperly routed wiring harness inside the sliding door. A similar recall also affected 15,902 2010 Volkswagen Routan vehicles.

=== 2011 model year ===
==== 2011 Chrysler Town & Country (2010–) ====
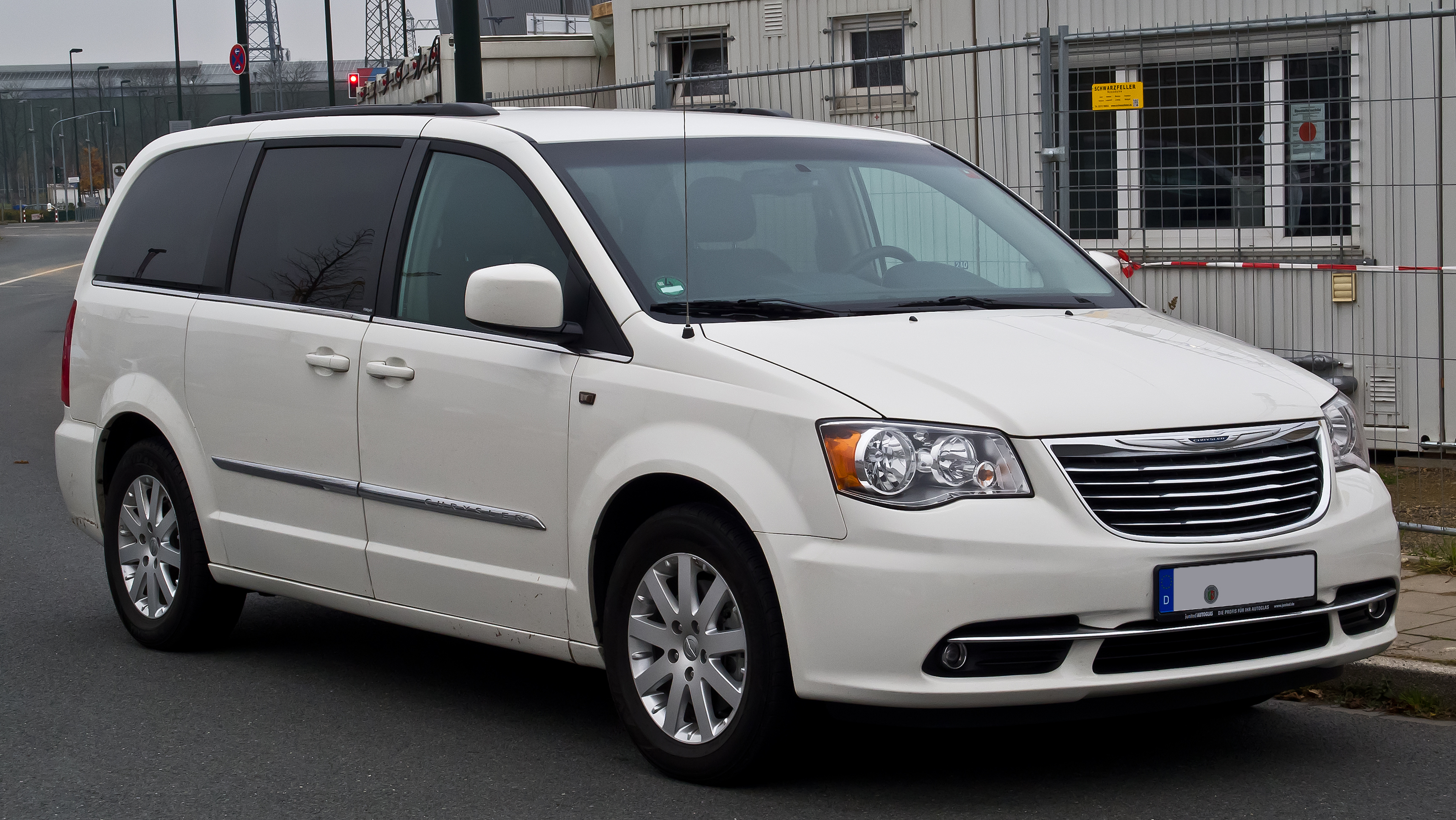
2011 facelift

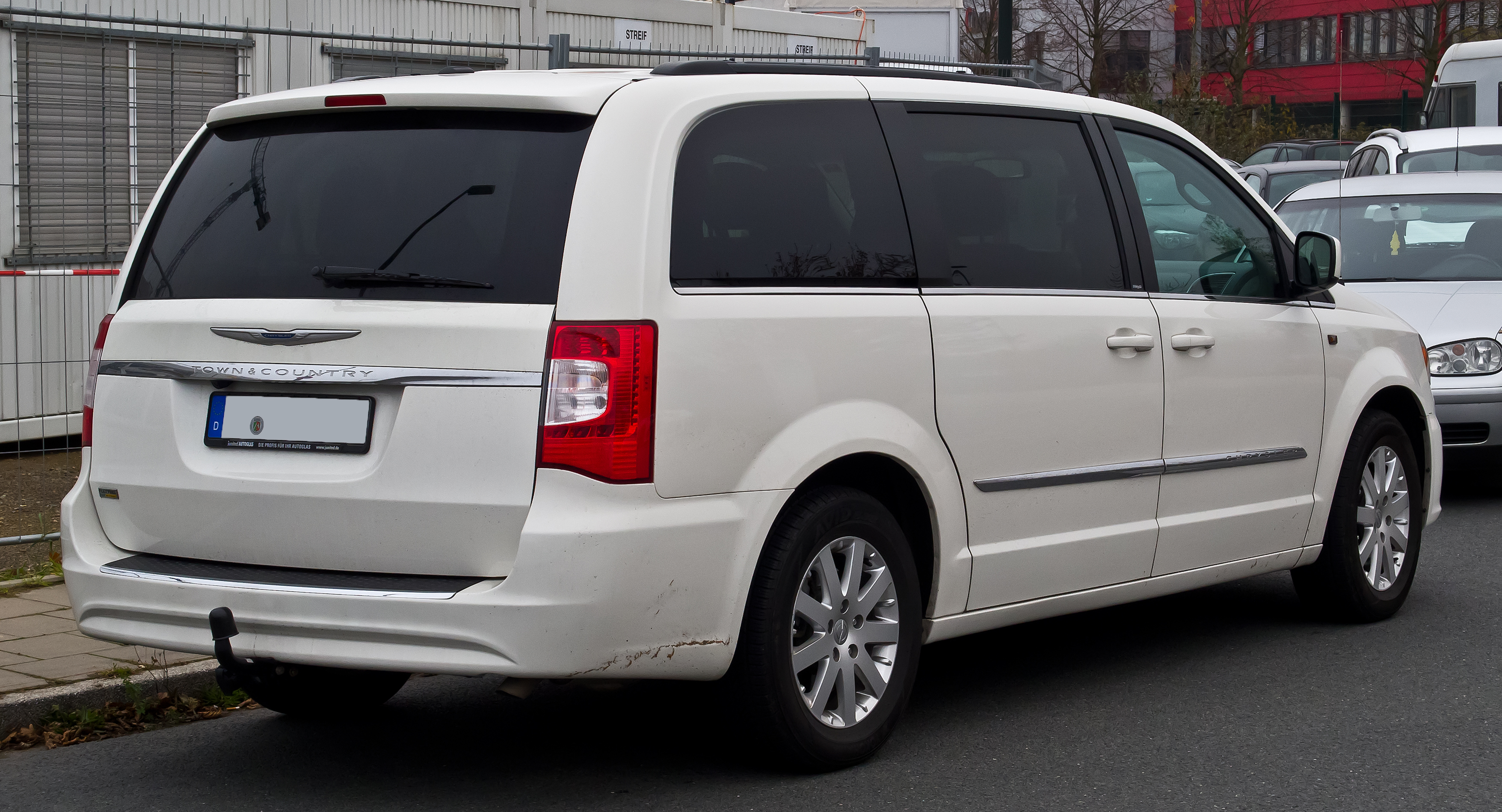
2011 facelift

The Dodge Grand Caravan and Chrysler Town & Country received mid-cycle refreshes for the 2011 model year. Changes included restyled exterior and interior with a new wing logo, standard SafetyTec (including Blind Spot Monitoring and Rear Cross Path Detection), improvement to the Stow 'n Go seating and storage system, a one-touch fold down feature for easier access to the third row, a new "super" center console and technology, a dual DVD system that can play different media at the same time, Sirius Backseat TV (featuring three channels of children's programming), FLO TV (featuring 20 channels of live programming), Pentastar V6 283 hp (211 kW; 287 PS) engine replacing previous 3.8 L and 3.3 L V6 engines, six-speed automatic transmission, a new fuel economizer mode, a new instrument panel and instrument cluster, new Chrysler brand steering wheel with integrated controls that allow the driver to operate the radio, cruise control, hands-free phone and other vehicle functions while keeping their hands on the wheel; upgraded cloth and leather seating materials; new "soft-touch" door trim, new heating and cooling control system. Other changes included retuned suspension with a larger front sway bar and new rear sway bar, increased rear roll center height, new spring rates, new steering gear, new front static camber setting, and lowered ride height; extra sound insulation, acoustic glass, new LED ambient lighting and center console, and new fog lights.

Canada models arrived in dealerships in the fourth quarter of 2010.

==== Production ====
The 2011 Chrysler Town & Country minivan was built at Chrysler Group LLC's Windsor Assembly plant in Windsor, Ontario, Canada starting on October 1, 2010.

=== 2012 changes ===
For 2012, leather seating and a rear-seat DVD entertainment system were made standard on all Town & Country trim levels. Cloth seating remained optional on the Touring trim in Canada, and standard on the Touring trim in Mexico. In Mexico, the "L" suffix on the Touring-L trim stood for leather. All interior lights were changed to blue, replacing the previous green lights.

==== Lancia Voyager (2011–) ====
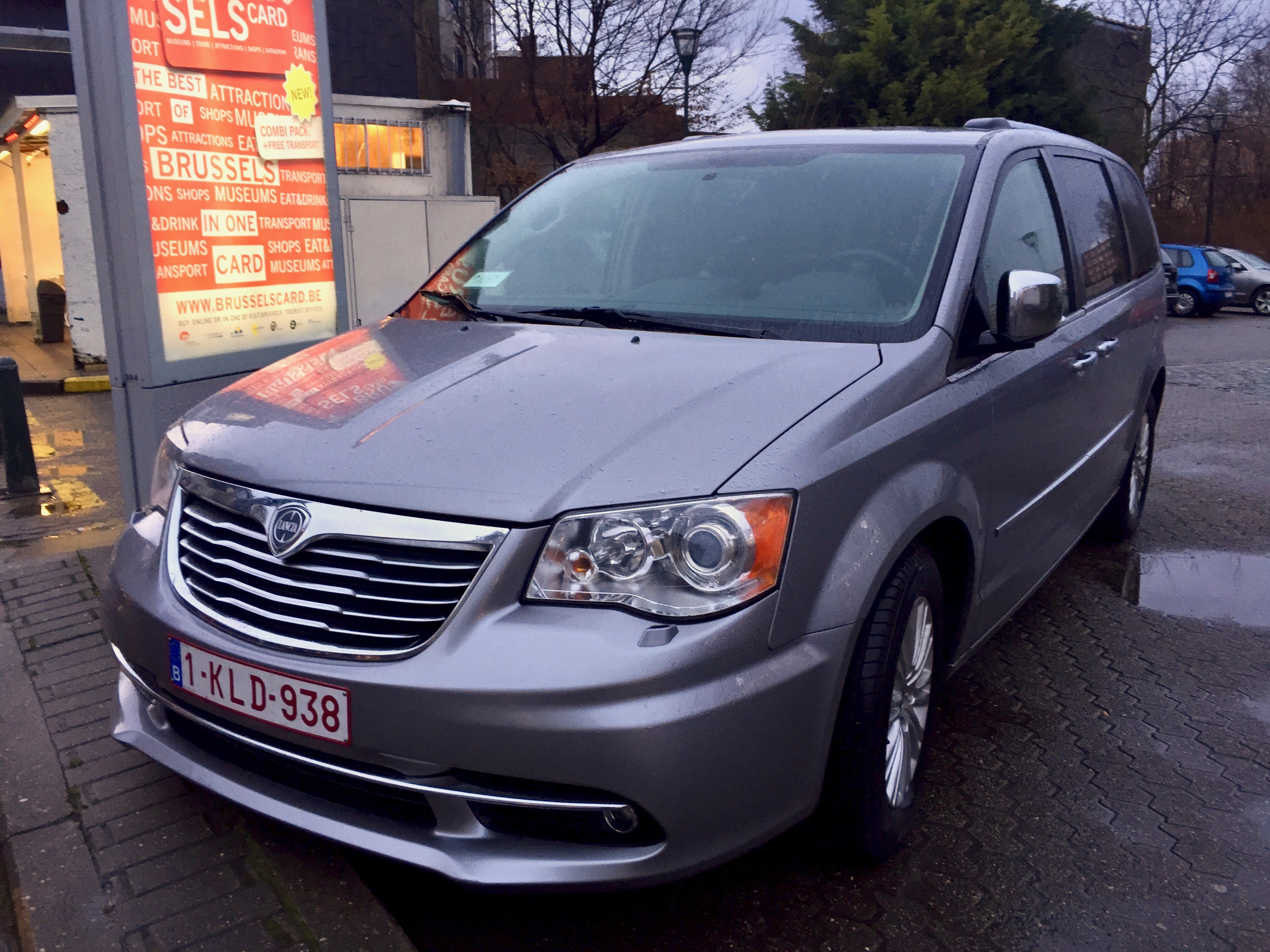
Lancia Voyager in Belgium

The Lancia Voyager is a version of Chrysler Town & Country for the European market as a replacement for the Lancia Phedra. Changes include the removal of chrome bodyside molding. The vehicle went on sale in October 2011 across Europe.

The early Italian model includes a gold trim level, a choice of two engines - 283 hp (211 kW; 287 PS) 3.6 L Pentastar petrol or 163 hp (122 kW; 165 PS) 2.8 L diesel - six-speed automatic transmission, a choice of four body colors (Brilliant Black, Carbon Grey, Silver and Stone White), a choice of two interior colors (Black/Grey and Beige), ParkSense assisted parking system with the optional ParkView rear view camera integration, 17-inch diamond-cut alloy wheels, black roof racks, seats upholstered in high-quality leather, audio controls on the steering wheel and gear lever knob, also leather-covered, ESP, six airbags, cruise control, fog lights, automatic headlights, active pedestrian protection, automatic three-zone climate control, six-speaker radio with CD player, UConnect hands-free system with iPod/MP3 support, heated door mirrors, side doors and tailgate with electric control.

It remains the Chrysler Grand Voyager in the United Kingdom, Ireland, South Africa, Australia, South Korea, Singapore, the Middle East, China, and Russia.

=== 2013 model year ===
==== 2013 Chrysler Town & Country update ====
Changes for the 2013 model year included an optional rear-seat, dual-screen Blu-ray/DVD system, sharper-resolution rear-seat DVD screens for all models, an HDMI input for video game systems, two rear-seat USB ports for charging cellphones or MP3 players, standard Trailer Sway Damping, standard power-folding mirrors on Limited and optional on Touring L models, new standard leather seating surfaces on Touring models, and a new 17-inch alloy wheel design for Touring L models.

Early US models include the Chrysler Town & Country Touring, Town & Country Touring L and Town & Country Limited.

==== 2013 Town & Country S ====
The Town & Country S was unveiled during the 2012 Los Angeles International Auto Show. The model came equipped with a black chrome grille, a black rear fascia step pad, "S" model badging, 17-inch aluminum wheels with polished face, black-painted pockets, and blacked-out headlight bezels (delayed availability), Black Torino leather seats with an "S" logo embroidered in the seat backs and black Ballistic cloth seat inserts, grey stitching at seats and door armrests, Piano Black gloss appliques at the instrument panel and on the spokes of the black leather-wrapped steering wheel, Chrysler Winged badge on the wheel (matching the black coloring of the exterior badging), a black headliner and upper consoles, black center console and an "S" logo in the instrument cluster, dual-screen Blu-ray/DVD system (with HDMI input, two USB recharging ports, a 12 V outlet and a 115 V two-prong outlet), a performance suspension, and a choice of four body colors (Brilliant Black, Deep Cherry Red, Stone White or Billet Silver).

==== 2013 Town & Country Tanya Moss edition ====
This van was a limited (150 units) version of 2013 Chrysler Town & Country for Mexico market, designed in collaboration with Mexican jewelry designer Tanya Moss.

==== Production ====
The 2013 Chrysler Town & Country minivan was built at Chrysler Group LLC's Windsor Assembly plant in Windsor, Ontario, Canada.

=== 2014 model year ===
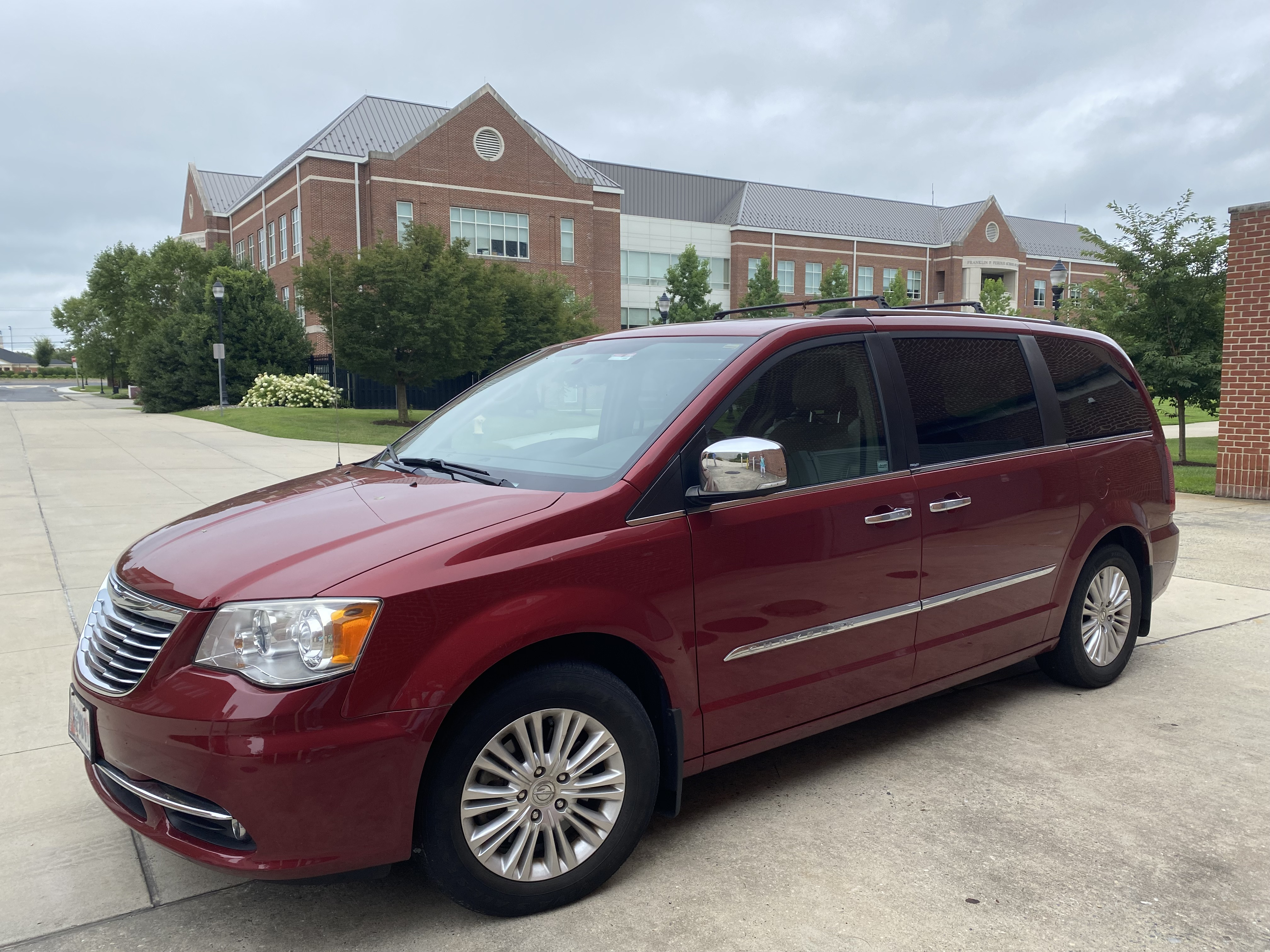
2014 Chrysler Town & Country Limited

Daytime running lamps are now a standard feature on US models. Previously, they were only standard on Canadian and European models; US models required dealer activation.

==== 2014 Chrysler Town & Country 30th Anniversary Edition, Town & Country S ====
The "30th Anniversary Edition" was a modified version of the Touring-L trim, commemorating the 30th anniversary of the Town & Country. This trim level came equipped with 17-inch aluminum wheels with polished faces and painted satin carbon pockets, '30th Anniversary' badging, Black Alcantara seat inserts with Nappa seat bolsters, Piano Black steering wheel bezels and instrument panel trim, third-row power folding seats, touchscreen radio with 30th Anniversary splash screen, 30th Anniversary logo on the key fob, rear back up camera, a choice of eight body colors (exclusive Granite Crystal Pearl Coat, Billet Silver Metallic Clear Coat, Brilliant Black Crystal Pearl Coat, Cashmere Pearl Coat, Deep Cherry Red Pearl Coat, Bright White Clear Coat, True Blue Pearl Coat, Maximum Steel Metallic Clear Coat).

The Town & Country S was carried over for the 2014 model year, which included a black chrome grille combined with black-background Chrysler winged badges front and rear, a black rear fascia step pad, "S" model badging, 17-inch aluminum wheels with polished face and black-painted pockets and blacked-out headlight bezels, Black Torino leather seats with an "S" logo embroidered in the seat backs, black Ballistic cloth seat inserts, grey stitching; grey stitching at door armrests, piano black gloss appliques on the instrument panel and on the spokes of the black leather-wrapped steering wheel, Chrysler winged badge on the wheel (matching the black coloring of the exterior badging), a black headliner and upper consoles, black center console, an "S" logo in the instrument cluster, dual-screen Blu-ray system (with HDMI input, two USB recharging ports, a 12 V outlet and a 115 V two-prong outlet, wireless headphones), and a performance suspension.

The 2014 Chrysler Town & Country was available in eight exterior colors: Billet Silver Metallic Clear Coat, Brilliant Black Crystal Clear Coat, Bright White Pearl Coat, Cashmere Pearl Coat, Deep Cherry Crystal Pearl Coat, Maximum Steel Pearl Coat, Mocha Java Pearl Coat, True Blue Pearl Coat and Sapphire Crystal Metallic Clear Coat.

==== Production ====
The 2014 Chrysler Town & Country was built at Chrysler Group LLC's Windsor Assembly Plant in Windsor, Ontario, Canada.

=== 2015 model year ===
For 2015, the LX model was reintroduced, now nearly identical to the Touring except for the lack of front fog lights and EVIC. Also introduced was a new Premium trim level for the Canadian market, including Alcantara and Nappa leather faced seats, heated front and 2nd-row seats, and a heated steering wheel as standard equipment.

The Limited was succeeded as the highest level trim by the Limited Platinum, which is near identical to the previous Limited save for a few changes. The Limited still continued production, although with a few standard features removed or made optional (such as HID headlamps) due to the Limited Platinum.

==== Production ====
The 2015 Chrysler Town & Country was built at FCA Canada Inc's Windsor Assembly Plant in Windsor, Ontario, Canada.

=== 2016 model year ===
All 2016 models were a carryover from the 2015 model year.

Projector headlamps are now standard across all trim levels in the US except for fleet vehicles; halogen projector headlamps replaced the reflector headlamps used in previous model years, HID headlamps are optional on Touring-L and Limited, and are standard on Limited Platinum. The reflector headlamps are retained on the Dodge Caravan. This was the last year for the Chrysler Town & Country.

==== Town & Country 90th Anniversary Edition ====
The 90th Anniversary Edition is a variant of the Touring-L commemorating the 90th anniversary of the Chrysler company, adding several optional features as standard features including heated second-row seats, a heated steering wheel, and a power sunroof. Distinguishing features are special badging, a 90th Anniversary Edition radio splash screen, and special floor mats. This model went on sale alongside the 200 90th Anniversary Edition, based on the 200 Limited, and 300 90th Anniversary Edition based on the 300 Limited.

==== Production ====
The 2016 Chrysler Town & Country was built at FCA Canada Inc's Windsor Assembly Plant in Windsor, Ontario, Canada.

=== Total sales ===
Calendar Year	US	Canada	México	Europe as Chrysler Voyager	Europe as Lancia Voyager	US as Volkswagen Routan	Mexico as Voyager
1997				40,621			
1998				41,420			
1999				37,235			
2000				32,241			
2001				35,898			
2002				31,191			
2003				28,588			
2004				28,732			
2005	180,759		3,416	28,283			
2006	159,105		3,094	27,406			
2007	138,151	1,531	2,821	21,304			
2008	118,563	4,865	3,154	13,898		3,387	2,896
2009	84,558	3,165	2,226	5,387	5,387	14,681	1,937
2010	112,275	4,175	2,942	5,665	5,665	15,961	3,199
2011	94,320	4,536	3,112	3,397	4,616	12,473	3,143
2012	111,744	3,991	3,211	542	5,568	10,484	3,419
2013	122,288	8,425	3,212	424	3,849	2,109	3,277
2014	138,040	8,944	2,933	565	4,132	1,103	
2015	93,848	9,001	2,706	29	1,984		
2016	59,071	2,910	1,639	20	94		
2017	577	5	60	11	11		
2018	5	0		16	16		
2019	4						

== Trim levels ==
1990–1995 models came in a single unnamed trim level, from here on referred to as "base."

=== Current ===
- Limited – 1999–2016
- Limited Platinum – 2015–2016 (US only)
- Premium – 2015–2016 (Canada only)
- Touring-L – 2011–2016
- Touring – 2004–2016
- LX – 1996–2010; 2015–2016 (known from 2015 on as LI in Mexico)
- S – 2013–2016 (US and Canada only)

(these current trim levels exclude Pacifica)

=== Former ===
- Base – 1989–1996; 2004–2007 (replaced by LX for model years 1997–1999, Voyager for model years 2001–2003)
- LXi – 1996–2003
- SX – 1997–1999
- eX – 2001–2004
- eL – 2002–2003

=== Special Edition Trims ===
- Touring Platinum Series – 2004–2007
- Walter P. Chrysler Signature Series – 2005–2010
- 25th Anniversary Edition – 2009
- Touring Signature Series – 2006–2007
- Spring Special Edition – 2006–2007
- Tanya Moss Limited Edition – 2013 (Mexico only; special paint color and badging, total production 150 units)
- 30th Anniversary Edition – 2014
- 90th Anniversary Edition – 2016

== Seating innovation ==
Chrysler has regularly innovated new seating systems for their minivans, to enhance interior flexibility.

=== Quad command ===
Introduced in 1990 for the 1991 model year, Chrysler marketed second-row "captains chairs" as a substitute to the "partial bench" second-row seat.

=== Integrated child safety seats ===
In 1991, a second-row bench seat integrating two child booster seats was introduced. These seats have continued as an available option through Generation 5.

=== Easy-Out Roller Seats ===
In 1995, Chrysler introduced a system of seats to simplify installation, removal, and re-positioning, marketed as Easy-Out Roller Seats. When installed, the seats are latched to floor-mounted strikers. When unlatched, eight rollers lift each seat, allowing it to be rolled fore and aft. Tracks have locator depressions for rollers, thus enabling simple installation. Ergonomic levers at the seatbacks release the floor latches single-handedly without tools and raise the seats onto the rollers in a single motion. Additionally, seatbacks were designed to fold forward. Seat roller tracks are permanently attached to the floor and seat stanchions are aligned, facilitating the longitudinal rolling of the seats. Bench seat stanchions were moved inboard to reduce bending stress in the seat frames, allowing them to be lighter.

When configured as two- and three-person benches (available through the fourth generation), the Easy Out Roller Seats could be unwieldy. Beginning in 2000, second- and third-row seats became available in a "quad" configuration — bucket or captain chairs in the second row and a third-row three-person 50/50 split "bench" — with each section weighing under 50 lbs. The Easy-out system remained in use through the fifth generation, where certain models featured a two-person bench and the under-floor compartments from the Stow 'n Go system.

The Volkswagen Routan, a rebadged nameplate variant of the Chrysler minivans, used the Easy Out Roller Seats on its second-row seating. These were made available on upper trims the Town and Country after the discontinuation of the Swivel 'n Go seats.

=== Stow 'n Go seating ===
In 2005, Chrysler introduced a system of second- and third-row seating that folded completely into under-floor compartments, marketed as Stow 'n Go seating and exclusively available on long-wheelbase models.

In a development program costing $400 million, engineers used an erector set to initially help visualize the complex interaction of the design and redesigned underfloor components to accommodate the system, including the spare tire well, fuel tank, exhaust system, parking brake cables, rear climate control lines, and the rear suspension. However, the new seating system prevented incorporation of an AWD system, effectively ending that option for the Chrysler minivans. The system in turn creates a combined volume of 12 cubic feet (340 L) of under floor storage when second row seats are deployed. With both rows folded, the vans have a flat load floor and a maximum cargo volume of 160.7 cubic feet (4,550 L).

The Stow 'n Go system received Popular Science magazine's "Best of What's New" for 2005 award.

The Stow 'n Go system was not offered on the (now-discontinued) Volkswagen Routan, a rebadged nameplate variant of the Chrysler minivans.

The Stow 'n Go seating and storage system in the Town & Country and Dodge Grand Caravan was improved, revised, and renamed "Super Stow 'n Go" for the 2011 model year. This system is still on the Grand Caravan and was adapted for the new Pacifica.

In 2021, Chrysler added an AWD option compatible with Stow 'n Go.

=== Swivel 'n Go ===
Chrysler introduced a seating system in 2008, marketed as Swivel 'n Go. The two second-row seats swivel to face the third row. A detachable table can be placed between the second and third-row seats. Swivel 'n Go was available with Stow 'n Go seating for 2008 and onward models. The Swivel 'n Go system was offered on the Dodge Caravan, but not the Volkswagen Routan, a rebadged nameplate variant of the Chrysler minivans.

The Swivel 'n Go Seats were manufactured by Intier, a division of Magna. The tracks, risers, and swivel mechanisms are assembled by Camslide, a division of Intier. The swivel mechanism was designed and produced by Toyo Seat USA Corp.

The system is noted for its high-strength. The entire load of the seat in the event of a crash is transferred through the swivel mechanism, which is almost twice as strong as the minimum government requirement. The swivel mechanism includes bumpers that stabilize the seat while in the lock position. When rotated the seat comes off these bumpers to allow easy rotation. The seat is not meant to be left in an unlocked position or swiveled with the occupant in it, although this will not damage the swivel mechanism.

Swivel 'n Go was dropped from the 2011 line of Chrysler and Dodge minivans due to a lack of consumer interest.

== Minivan production ==
The Chrysler Town & Country and Dodge Grand Caravan minivans with Stow 'n Go and Swivel 'n Go seats were built in Windsor, Ontario. Two plants had the task of building the Town & Country, with Saint Louis Assembly assembling it from 1989 until 2001, and Windsor from 2001 onwards. In May 2006, Windsor Assembly became the lead producer of the RT, but would not fully take over until 2009 after phasing out production of the Pacifica (CS). The Saint Louis Assembly plant was closed in October 2008, making Windsor the sole producer of the Chrysler Town & Country and Dodge Grand Caravan.

Taiwanese-market Town & Country minivans were assembled in Yangmei under license by the China Motor Corporation, starting with the 2006 model year. They are based on the European-market Chrysler Grand Voyager with the 3.3 L engine, with minor changes for the local market including LED taillights and backup cameras. Production ended in 2007, and the production line was relocated to China, where Soueast continued to assemble it under the Chrysler Grand Voyager and Dodge Grand Caravan nameplates from 2008 until late 2010.

From 1991 until 2007, Chrysler Voyager/Grand Voyager cars were assembled in Austria and sold out in Europe and in many other global markets. The European version was also produced in Ontario from 2008 onwards, although diesel engines are still available, and the trim is also different. From the outside the cars look very similar to the North American Town & Country, but are sold as the Chrysler Grand Voyager.

The Town & Country is also marketed in Mexico, Venezuela, and from 2011 on, in Brazil, as it was previously sold there rebadged as the Chrysler Caravan.

== Town & Country Plug-in hybrid ==
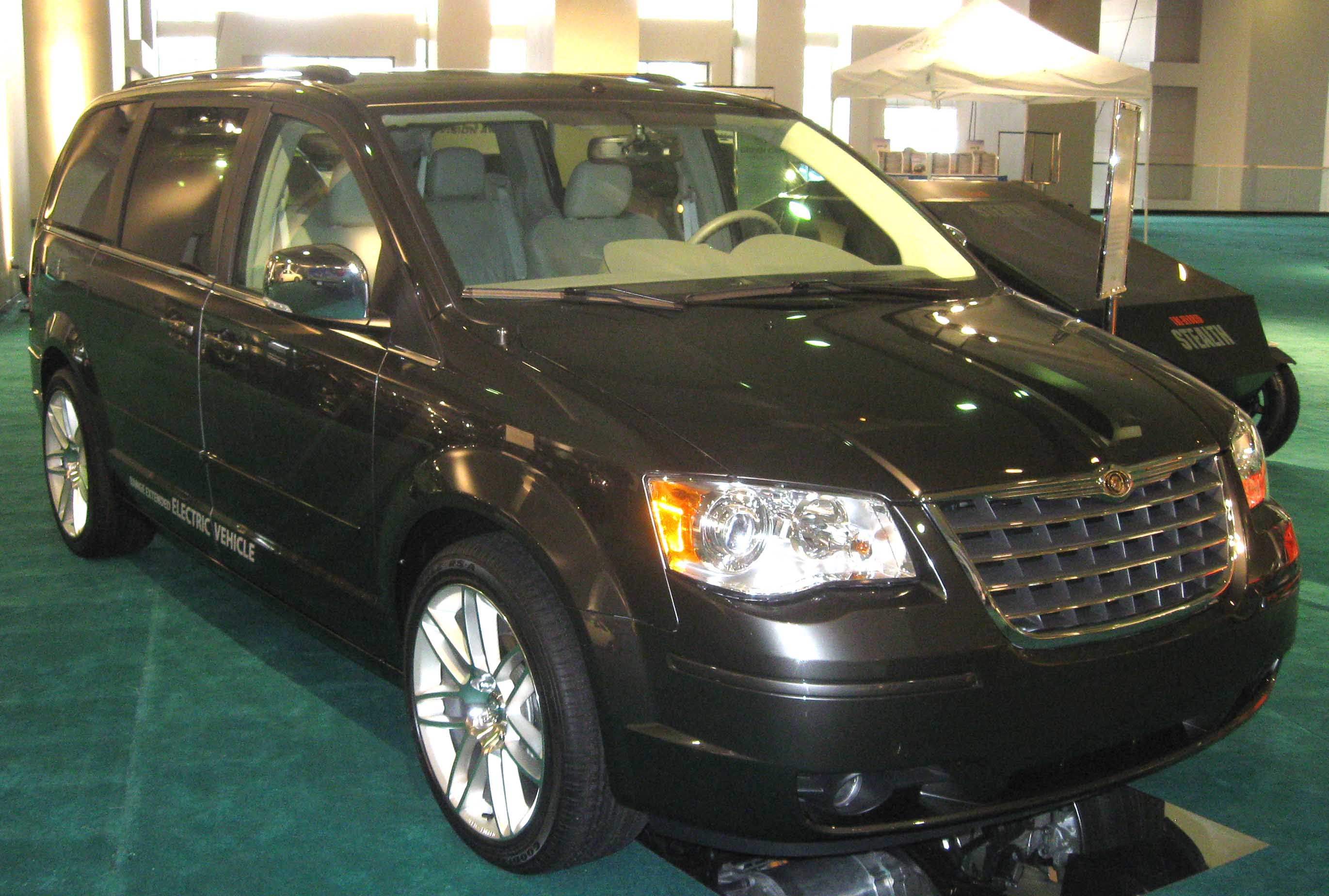
Chrysler Town & Country EV

In September 2008, Chrysler unveiled a plug-in hybrid version of the Town & Country, along with a similarly engineered 4-door Jeep Wrangler and a purely electric sports car. The Town & Country prototype had an all-electric range of 40-mile (64 km) before gasoline starts. However, in November 2009, Fiat SpA disbanded Chrysler's ENVI electric car division and dropped these models from future product plans.

A two-year demonstration program with 25 flexible-fuel plug-in minivans began in April 2012. The first Town and Country models were delivered in Auburn Hills, Michigan and Charlotte, North Carolina. The US$26-million demonstration project is partially financed by a US$10 million grant from the U.S. Department of Energy (DOE). The plug-in hybrid minivans are equipped with an E85-compatible 3.6 L Pentastar engine mated to a front-wheel-drive, with two-mode hybrid transmission. The plug-in hybrid is powered by a liquid-cooled 12.1 KWh lithium-ion battery that delivers a total output of 290 horsepower. The total vehicle range is 700 mi (1,100 km).

A plug-in hybrid version of the next-generation Chrysler minivan launched in the U.S. in late 2016.

Fire incident

In September 2012, Chrysler temporarily suspended the demonstration program. All 109 Dodge Ram 1500 Plug-in Hybrids and 23 Chrysler Town & Country plug-in hybrids deployed by the program were recalled due to damage sustained by three separate pickup trucks when their 12.9 kWh battery packs overheated. The carmaker planned to upgrade the battery packs with cells that use different lithium-ion chemistry before the vehicles go back on service. Chrysler explained that no one was injured from any of the incidents, and the vehicles were not occupied at the time, nor any of the minivans were involved in any incident, but they were withdrawn as a precaution. The demonstration was a program jointly funded by Chrysler and the U.S. Department of Energy that included the first-ever factory-produced vehicles capable of reverse power flow. The experimental system would allow fleet operators to use their plug-in hybrids to supply electricity for a building during a power outage, reduce power usage when electric rates are high, or even sell electricity back to their utility company. The company reported that the demonstration fleet had collectively accumulated 1.3 million miles (2.1 million km) before the vehicles were recalled. Chrysler also reported that the plug-in pickups delivered peak average fuel economy of 37.4 mpg_{‑US} (6.29 L/100 km; 44.9 mpg_{‑imp}), while the plug-in hybrid minivans delivered 55.0 mpg_{‑US} (4.28 L/100 km; 66.1 mpg_{‑imp}).
