= Volkswagen Routan =

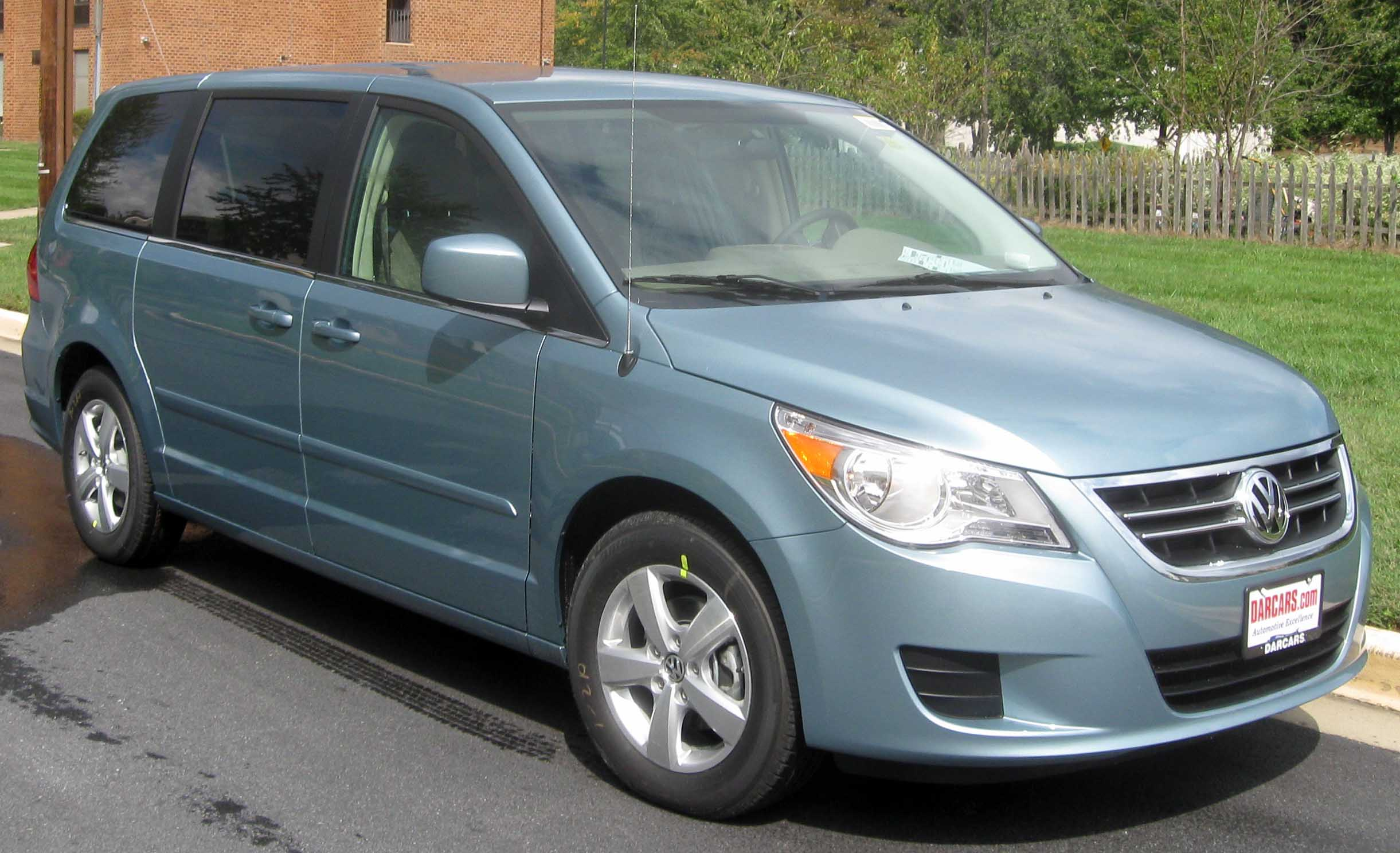
- 2009 Volkswagen Routan SE

Overview
- Manufacturer: Chrysler LLC (2009); Chrysler Group LLC (2009–2014); FCA US LLC (2014)
- Production: 2008–2013
- Model years: 2009–2014
- Assembly: Canada: Windsor, Ontario (Windsor Assembly)

Body and chassis
- Class: Minivan
- Body style: 5-door minivan
- Layout: Front-engine, front-wheel-drive
- Platform: Chrysler RT platform
- Related: Chrysler Town & Country; Dodge Grand Caravan; Chrysler Voyager; Lancia Voyager

Powertrain
- Engine: 3.6 L Pentastar V6 (2011–2014); 3.8 L EGH V6 (2008–2010); 4.0 L EGQ V6 (2008–2010)
- Transmission: 62TE 6-speed automatic

Dimensions
- Wheelbase: 121.2 in (3,078 mm)
- Length: 202.5 in (5,144 mm)
- Width: 76.9 in (1,953 mm)
- Height: 68.9 in (1,750 mm)

Chronology
- Predecessor: Volkswagen Transporter (T4) (U.S. & Canada); Volkswagen Sharan (Mexico)
- Successor: Volkswagen Atlas (U.S. & Canada); Volkswagen ID. Buzz; Volkswagen Transporter (T6) (Mexico)

The Volkswagen Routan is a seven-seat minivan marketed and sold by Volkswagen from the 2009 to 2014 model years. It is a rebadged variant of the Chrysler RT platform, with revised styling, content features, and suspension tuning from the fifth-generation Dodge Grand Caravan and Chrysler Town & Country.

Manufactured alongside the Chrysler and Dodge minivans at Windsor Assembly and marketed in the United States, Canada, and Mexico, the Routan debuted at the 2008 Chicago Auto Show and went on sale in the United States in September of the same year as a 2009 model. The Routan's minivan variants include the Dodge Caravan, Ram C/V, Chrysler Town & Country, and Lancia Voyager (export); by 2009, they ranked as the 13th best-selling automotive nameplate worldwide, with over 12 million sold.

Production of the Routan was halted in 2012 due to high inventory levels, and Volkswagen announced that the 2013 model year would be primarily reserved for rental car companies and other fleets, with limited availability to the public at dealer showrooms. This also held for the 2014 Routan.

== History ==
The Routan marked the start of Volkswagen's business strategy to offer additional vehicles specially developed for the U.S. market. The introduction of the 2009 model year minivan resulted from a partnership that began in 2005 between Volkswagen and DaimlerChrysler. Before the agreement, Volkswagen had no minivan model for the United States or Canadian markets. The Routan was sold only in North America (U.S., Canada, Mexico).

The automaker's intent in outsourcing production of the Routan to Chrysler was to avoid the significant expense of developing its family-sized minivan. VW announced in an early 2008 projection that the company intended for the Routan and other models to help achieve significant expansion of U.S. sales. The Routan was Volkswagen's first van offered in North America since discontinuation of the Volkswagen Eurovan in 2003, and is not related to the European-market Volkswagen Touran.

In 2012, Volkswagen halted production of the Routan at Chrysler's Windsor, Ontario, plant despite having a production contract that ran through 2014. In January 2013, Volkswagen announced that there would be no 2013 retail model but held open the possibility that development may resume with a potential 2014 model. The 2013 Routan was reserved for fleet purchasers, and Chrysler produced 2,500 during the calendar year.

Autotrader.com opined that industry observers wouldn't be surprised by VW's decision to drop the Routan due to its poor sales figures, and as most shoppers found no reason for selecting the Routan over the similar Dodge Grand Caravan or the Chrysler Town & Country, and the Routan's base price of nearly $28,000 was far more than the basic $21,000 Grand Caravan, while the Routan's list of equipment was less than included on the upscale Town & Country.

== Features ==
=== Interior ===
The Routan featured a rebranded version of Chrysler's hard-drive-based audio and navigation system—marketed by Chrysler as the MyGig system and by Volkswagen as the Joybox. Routans for 2010 offered optional Wi-Fi access, which was also provided in Dodge and Chrysler versions as UConnect Web.

The Routan was not offered with Chrysler's Stow'n Go nor Swivel'n Go seating systems. Instead, the second-row seats in the Routan feature the Easy Out Roller Seat system. As the Routan retains the underfloor recesses, it can be field-modified using Chrysler or Dodge parts to have Stow'n Go or Swivel'n Go seats.

=== Engine ===
At first, the Routan was available with the Chrysler 3.8 L V6 engine producing 197 hp (147 kW) and 230 lb⋅ft (312 N⋅m), and the 4.0 L V6 producing 251 hp (187 kW) and 259 lb⋅ft (351 N⋅m)—with either engine mated to Chrysler's 62TE six-speed automatic transaxle with manual shift capability (See Ultradrive#62TE).

In 2011, the Routan was available with a new engine from Chrysler, the 3.6 L V6 producing 283 hp (211 kW) and 260 lb⋅ft (353 N⋅m) mated to a six-speed automatic from Chrysler.

Displacement (L)	Type	Valves	Power at rpm	Torque at rpm	Compression Ratio	Fuel Economy (MPG)	Years
3.6	DOHC	24	283 hp (211 kW) at 6,350	260 lb⋅ft (353 N⋅m) at 4,400	10.0:1	17/25	2011–2012
3.8	OHV	12	197 hp (147 kW) at 5,200	230 lb⋅ft (312 N⋅m) at 4,000	9.6:1	16/23	2008–2011
4.0	SOHC	24	251 hp (187 kW) at 6,000	259 lb⋅ft (351 N⋅m) at 4,100	10.2:1	17/25	2008–2011

== Markets ==
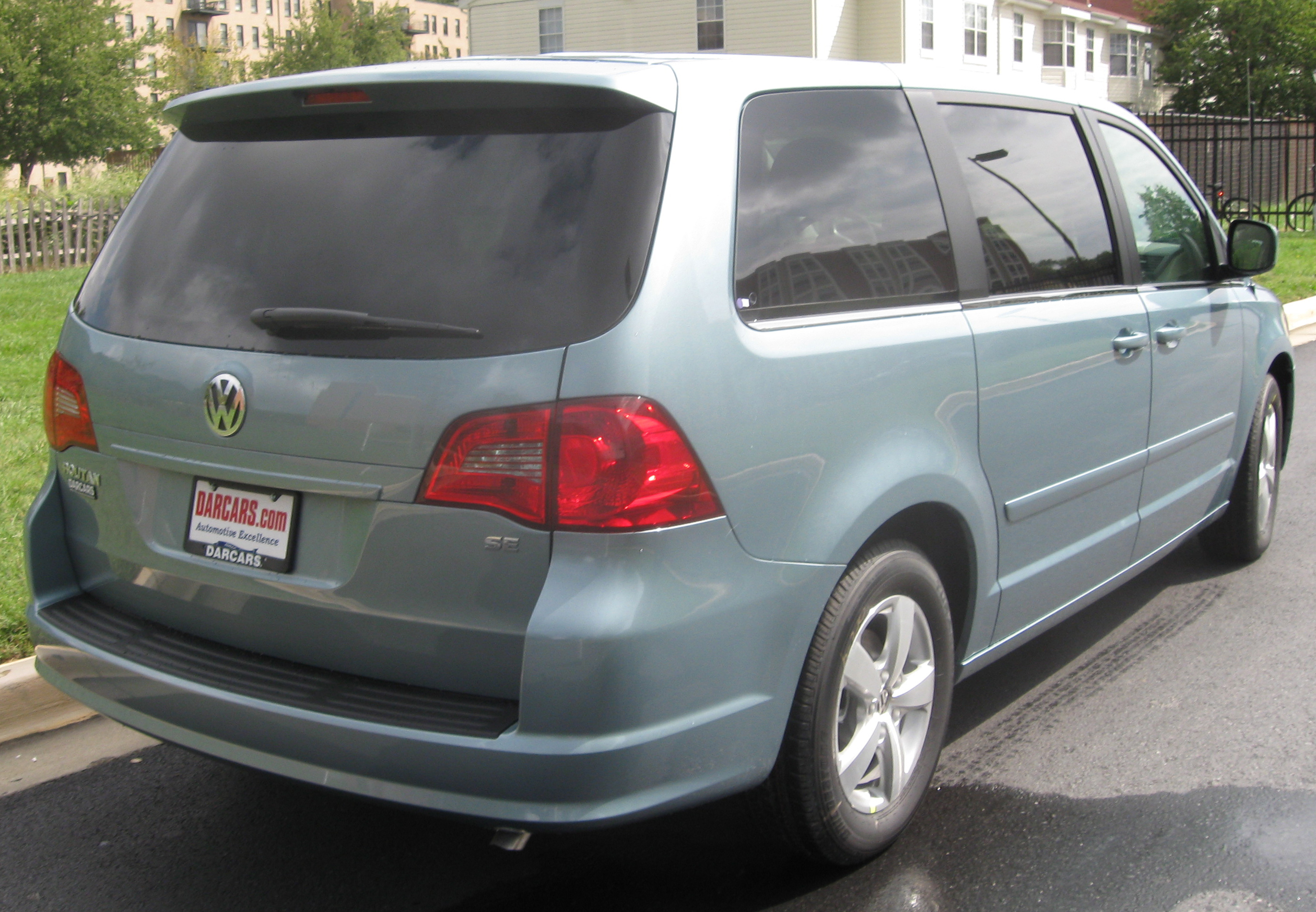
2009 Volkswagen Routan SE

=== United States ===
Volkswagen Group of America had projected for the Routan to gain at least five percent of the U.S. minivan market, or 45,000 units of the 700,000 minivans sold currently. In January 2009, VW of America asked Chrysler Canada to stop production of the Routan during February after 29,000 Routans had been shipped to US dealerships. By July 2009, 11,677 units had been sold.

==== Trims ====
Trim	Engine
S	3.8 L V6
SE	3.8 L V6
SEL	4.0 L V6
SEL Premium	4.0 L V6
S	3.6 L V6
SE	3.6 L V6
SEL	3.6 L V6
SEL Premium	3.6 L V6

==== Sales ====
Jan 2008	Feb 2008	Mar 2008	Apr 2008	May 2008	Jun 2008	Jul 2008	Aug 2008	Sep 2008	Oct 2008	Nov 2008	Dec 2008	Total 2008
—	—	—	—	—	—	—	—	375	789	1,324	899	3,387
Jan 2009	Feb 2009	Mar 2009	Apr 2009	May 2009	Jun 2009	Jul 2009	Aug 2009	Sep 2009	Oct 2009	Nov 2009	Dec 2009	Total 2009
663	503	1,029	2,606	1,390	2,099	1,350	2,098	901	669	540	833	14,681
Total 2010
15,961
Total 2011
12,473
Total 2012
10,484
Total 2013
2,109
Total 2014
1,103

=== Mexico ===
Volkswagen de México markets the Routan alongside the Transporter (formerly marketed locally as the Eurovan), replacing the European-built Volkswagen Sharan minivan in the autumn of 2008.

==== Trims ====
Trim	Engine
Prestige	3.8 L V6
Exclusive	3.8 L V6

=== Canada ===
Volkswagen Canada began selling the Routan in the autumn of 2008. Like its United States counterpart, VW Canada had yet to feature a minivan in its vehicle lineup since the discontinuation of the Eurovan. For the four months that the Routan minivan was on sale in Canada in 2008 (September through December), the company sold 335 units. The only engine available was the 4.0 L. The 3.8 L was not available in Canada. An evaluation of 2011 Canadian-market models described the Dodge-based minivan as "one of the best on the road and the VW version is a real bargain compared to buying a well-optioned Chrysler version" and that includes a nicer interior as well as sportier suspension and steering.

==== Trims ====
Trim	Engine
Trendline	4.0 L V6
Comfortline	4.0 L V6
Highline	4.0 L V6
Execline	4.0 L V6
Trendline	3.6 L V6
Comfortline	3.6 L V6
Highline	3.6 L V6

=== Replacement ===
At the 2013 North American International Auto Show, Volkswagen revealed the Volkswagen CrossBlue Concept SUV. The automaker is considering a seven-passenger SUV based on the show car as a replacement for the Routan. The production SUV, called Atlas, was launched in 2017 as a 2018 model.

== Recalls ==
=== Ignition Switch ===
"Volkswagen recalled 20,676 examples of the 2009–2010 Routan minivan to replace their key fobs and ignition switches." "In these vehicles, it's possible that if the switch is jarred, the key can be jostled out of the Run position. If this happens, the engine shuts off, and the airbags, power steering, and power brakes are all deactivated, which is a safety problem."
