= Windsor Assembly =

Automobile factory by Stellantis Canada

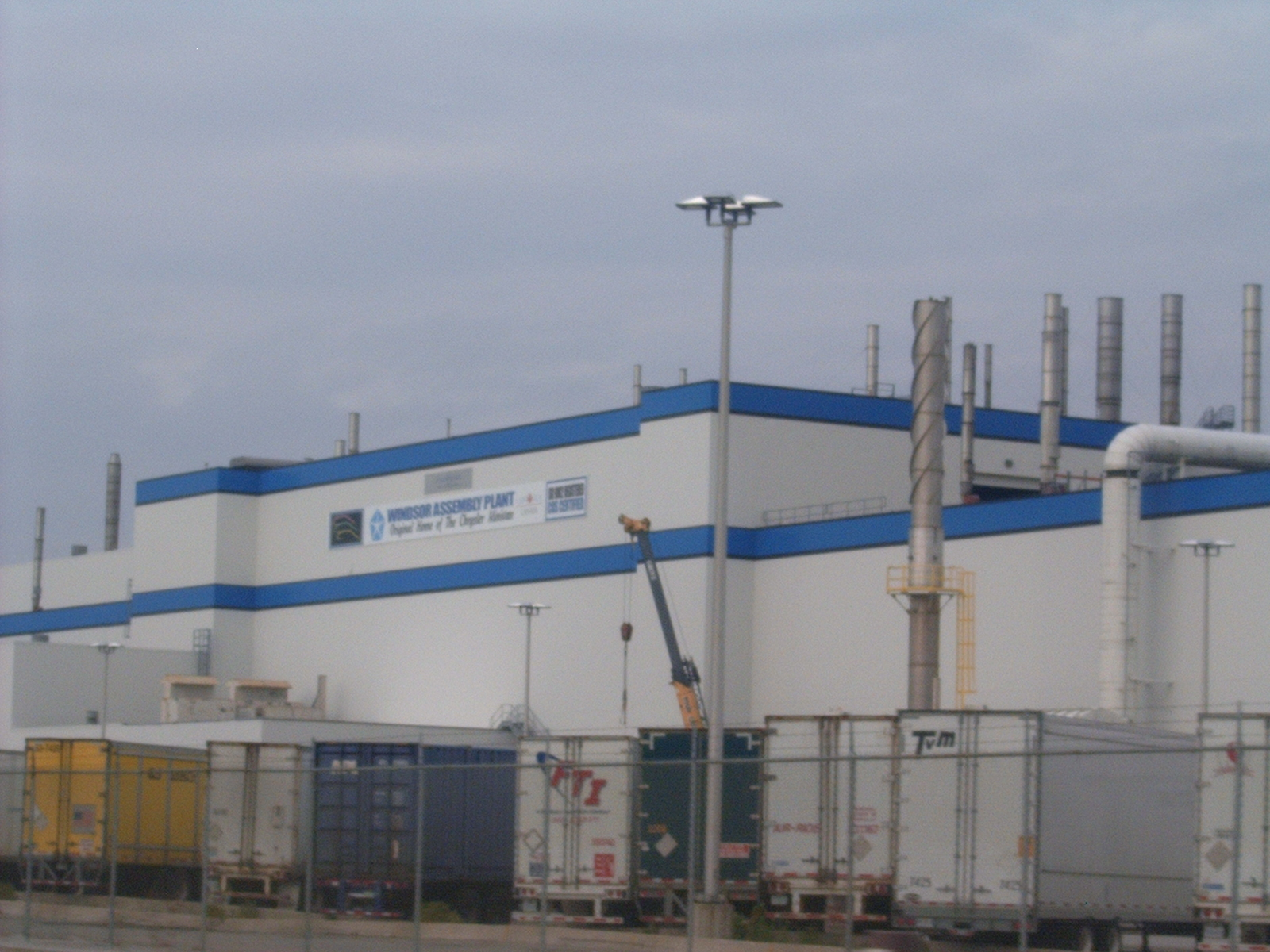
- The factory as seen in 2006
- Operated: 1928–present
- Location: 2199 Chrysler Centre; Windsor, Ontario
- Coordinates: 42°17′48.9″N 82°59′7.4″W
- Industry: Automotive
- Products: Minivans
- Employees: 4,123 (2022)
- Architect: Hutton & Souter
- Area: 177 acres (0.72 km^{2})
- Volume: 4,400,000 sq ft (410,000 m^{2})
- Owner: Stellantis Canada

Windsor Assembly Plant (WAP) is a Stellantis Canada automobile factory in Windsor, Ontario. The factory opened in 1928 and Chrysler minivans production began in 1983. Windsor Assembly is Windsor's largest employer. The plant currently operates two shifts with over 4,200 employees.

== Overview ==
The plant was designed by the architectural firm Hutton & Souter. It covers 408,773 square metres (4.4 million sq. ft.) on 50 hectares (120 acres) and manufactured the Generation I Dodge Caravan and Plymouth Voyager minivans from 1983 until 1991. The Generation II minivans, constructed on the AS platform was equipped with an optional V6 engine and in a new long wheel-base version. The Generation III (NS) minivan production began in 1995 — with dual sliding doors. Starting in July 2000, the Generation IV (RS) minivan, which included the Stow'n Go seating, was produced until July 2007. In August 2007, the Generation V (RT) minivan was introduced which continues with the Stow 'n Go and features the new Swivel'n Go seating. The current Chrysler Pacifica (RU) minivan, that replaced the Chrysler Town & Country, entered production in 2016 for the 2017 model year and includes both gasoline engine and plug-in hybrid versions.

In March 2019, FCA Canada announced it would cut the third shift at Windsor Assembly, eliminating 1,500 jobs. Although the third shift was initially scheduled to end in September 2019, it was extended multiple times. The third shift finally ended on July 10, 2020.

Production of the Dodge Grand Caravan ended August 21, 2020 as FCA moves retail and fleet customers to the new entry-level Chrysler Voyager and Chrysler Grand Caravan.

== Vehicles produced ==
=== Current ===
- Chrysler Pacifica (2017–present)
  - Chrysler Voyager/Grand Caravan (2020–present)
- Dodge Charger Daytona and SIXPACK 2024–present)

=== Past ===
Windsor Assembly assembled many vehicles before the plant was converted in 1982 for the production of the Minivan. Although the vehicle has had many names under different brands, the minivan has always been built at WAP. A deal with Volkswagen resulted in the plant assembling the Routan (RM) on the same platform as the Dodge Grand Caravan and Chrysler Town & Country models in August 2008. Production lasted until 2013.

With the closure of Windsor Assembly's sister plant, Saint Louis Assembly, in Fenton, Missouri in October 2008, WAP started producing the right-hand drive and diesel versions for the world market in August 2009 for the 2010 model year under the Chrysler nameplate and eventually the Lancia Voyager.

- 1953–1955 Dodge M37/M43
- 1959–1960 Chrysler Saratoga
- 1960–1966 Plymouth Valiant
- 1961–1966 Chrysler Windsor
- 1964–1965 Valiant Barracuda
- 1967–1976 Dodge Dart
- 1967–1976 Plymouth Valiant
- 1975–1978 Dodge Charger
- 1975–1983 Chrysler Cordoba
- 1978 Dodge Li'l Red Express Truck
- 1978–1979 Dodge Magnum
- 1980–1983 Dodge Mirada
- 1981 Chrysler LeBaron
- 1981–1983 Chrysler Imperial
- 1981–1983 Dodge Diplomat/Plymouth Caravelle/Plymouth Gran Fury
- 1982–1983 Chrysler New Yorker/Chrysler New Yorker Fifth Avenue
- 1984–2000 Plymouth Voyager
- 1984–2007 Dodge Caravan
- 1987–2000 Plymouth Grand Voyager
- 1987–2020 Dodge Grand Caravan
- 1990–2016 Chrysler Town & Country
- 2001–2003 Chrysler Voyager
- 2004–2008 Chrysler Pacifica
- 2009–2013 Volkswagen Routan
- 2011–2014 Lancia Voyager
- 2012–2015 Ram C/V Tradesman
