= Chrysler 3.3 & 3.8 engines =

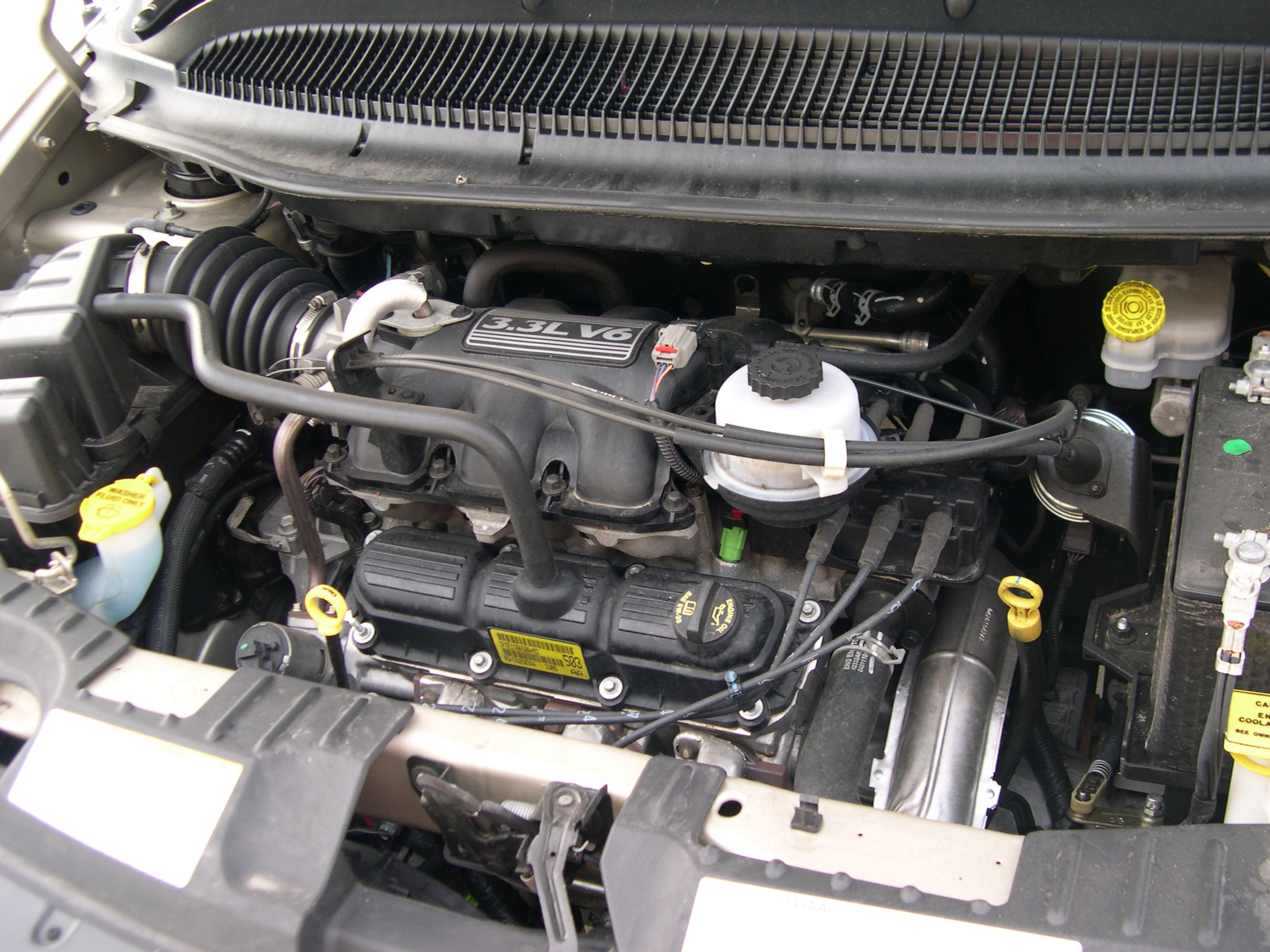

Overview
- Manufacturer: Chrysler Corporation (1989-1998); DaimlerChrysler AG (1998–2007); Chrysler LLC (2007–2009); Chrysler Group LLC (2009-2011)
- Production: 1989–2011

Layout
- Configuration: Naturally aspirated 60° V6
- Displacement: 3.3–3.8 L; 201.4–230.5 cu in (3,301–3,778 cc)
- Cylinder bore: 93 mm (3.66 in); 96 mm (3.78 in)
- Piston stroke: 81 mm (3.19 in); 87 mm (3.43 in)
- Cylinder block material: Cast iron
- Cylinder head material: Aluminum
- Valvetrain: OHV 2 valves per cyl.
- Valvetrain drive system: Timing Chain
- Compression ratio: 8.9:1-9.6:1

Combustion
- Fuel system: Sequential MPFI
- Fuel type: Gasoline; Compressed Natural Gas; E85
- Oil system: Wet sump
- Cooling system: Water-cooled

Output
- Power output: 150–215 hp (152–218 PS; 112–160 kW)
- Torque output: 180–245 lb⋅ft (25–34 kg⋅m; 244–332 N⋅m)

Chronology
- Predecessor: Chrysler Slant straight-6; Chrysler LA 239 V6 engine; AMC straight-6 engine; Mitsubishi 6G7 V6 engine
- Successor: Chrysler Pentastar engine

The Chrysler 3.3 and 3.8 engines are V6 engines used by Chrysler from 1989 to 2011. This engine family was Chrysler's first 60° V6 engine designed and built in-house for front wheel drive vehicles, and their first V6 not based on a V8. It was designed as a larger, more powerful alternative to the Mitsubishi 3.0 V6 in the minivans and debuted in 1989 for the 1990 model year. They were later also used in some rear wheel drive cars like the Jeep Wrangler.

The engines were produced in two major variants differing by their piston displacement: a 3.3 L; 201.4 cu in (3,301 cc) and a 3.8 L; 230.5 cu in (3,778 cc). The 3.3 was dropped after 2010 with the Chrysler minivans, and the 3.8 was dropped after 2011 with the Jeep Wrangler, ending 22 years in production.

== Specifications ==
Displacement	Years	Power	Torque
3.3 L; 201.4 cu in (3,301 cc)	1990–1993	150 hp (112 kW)	180 lb⋅ft (244 N⋅m)
3.3 L; 201.4 cu in (3,301 cc)	1994–1995	162 hp (121 kW)	194 lb⋅ft (263 N⋅m)
3.3 L; 201.4 cu in (3,301 cc)	1996–2000	158 hp (118 kW)	203 lb⋅ft (275 N⋅m)
3.3 L; 201.4 cu in (3,301 cc)	2001–2010	180 hp (134 kW)	210 lb⋅ft (285 N⋅m)
3.8 L; 230.5 cu in (3,778 cc)	1991–1993	150 hp (112 kW)	213 lb⋅ft (289 N⋅m)
3.8 L; 230.5 cu in (3,778 cc)	1994–1995	162 hp (121 kW)	213 lb⋅ft (289 N⋅m)
3.8 L; 230.5 cu in (3,778 cc)	1996–1997	166 hp (124 kW)	227 lb⋅ft (308 N⋅m)
3.8 L; 230.5 cu in (3,778 cc)	1998–2000	180 hp (134 kW)	240 lb⋅ft (325 N⋅m)
3.8 L; 230.5 cu in (3,778 cc)	2001–2007	215 hp (160 kW)	245 lb⋅ft (332 N⋅m)
3.8 L; 230.5 cu in (3,778 cc)	2008–2011	197 hp (147 kW)	230 lb⋅ft (312 N⋅m)

== History ==
The original 3.3 engine, as well as the larger 3.8, are pushrod engine designs. The 3.3 was introduced in 1989 with the 1990 Chrysler Imperial, New Yorker, and related K-series models, and was joined in 1991 by the 3.8. Production on the 3.3 was stopped in 2010 after a run of 5,076,603 engines, while the 3.8 remained in production until May 2011 in Trenton, Michigan for the Jeep Wrangler. Both use a cast iron block and aluminum heads.

=== 3.3 ===
The first of the family, the 3.3 liter engine's actual piston displacement is 3.3 L; 201.4 cu in (3,301 cc) with a 93 mm × 81 mm (3.66 in × 3.19 in) bore and stroke. In 1994, the 3.3 received a 12 hp (9 kW) increase in power to 162 hp (121 kW) due to a new air intake. In 2001, the engine was fitted with a variable intake control system which boosted output to 180 hp (134 kW) at 5000 rpm and 210 lb⋅ft (285 N⋅m) at 4000 rpm. The engine was especially suited for transverse applications in Chrysler's minivans, but was also used in a longitudinal front-wheel-drive setup on 1993-1997 LH platform cars. It was last used in 2010 for Chrysler minivans before the introduction of the new 3.6 L Pentastar engine for the 2011 model year.

Designated EGA, the 3.3 was built at Trenton Engine in Trenton, Michigan. It uses Sequential fuel injection, has roller tappets and features forged steel connecting rods, a one-piece cast camshaft, and either a cast aluminum or reinforced plastic intake manifold. The 3.3 has a timing chain, and is an interference engine meaning that the valves will collide with the pistons in the event of a timing chain failure.

Vehicles using the 3.3 include:

- 1990–1993 Dodge Dynasty, Chrysler New Yorker, Chrysler Imperial, (replaced the 3.0 L Mitsubishi 6G72 engine)
- 1990–2010 Chrysler minivans
- 1993–1997 Chrysler Concorde/Dodge Intrepid/Eagle Vision

=== 3.8 ===
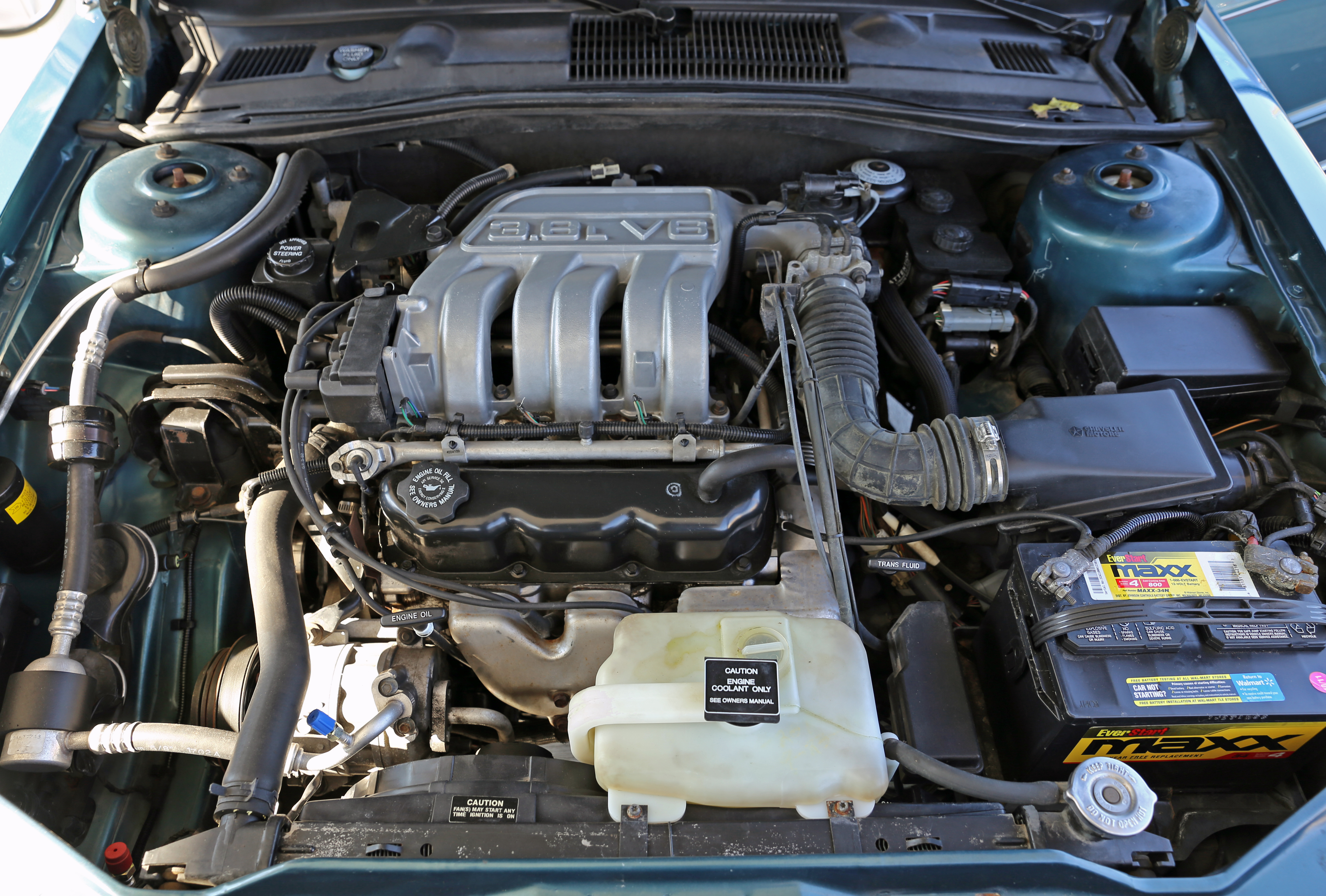
The 3.8 liter EGH engine in a 1993 Chrysler Imperial

The 3.3 was bored and stroked to 3.78 in × 3.43 in (96.01 mm × 87.12 mm) to create a 3.8 L; 230.5 cu in (3,778 cc) version. This EGH version was also built at Trenton Engine in Trenton, MI.

The 3.8 received an increase in power of 12 hp (9 kW), for a total of 162 hp (121 kW) in 1994 via a new intake system. In 1998 the compression ratio increased for a total of 180 hp (134 kW) and 240 lb⋅ft (325 N⋅m). In 2001, like the 3.3 the 3.8 received the symmetrical reinforced plastic intake plenum and revised camshaft which boosted output to 215 hp (160 kW) at 5000 rpm with 245 lb⋅ft (332 N⋅m) at 4000 rpm.

Vehicles using the 3.8 include:

- 1991–1993 Chrysler New Yorker and Chrysler Imperial 150 hp (112 kW), 213 lb⋅ft (289 N⋅m)
- 1994–2010 Chrysler minivans
- 2007–2011 Jeep Wrangler (JK)
- 2009–2010 Volkswagen Routan

== SOHC ==
A single overhead camshaft was an addition to the lineup for 1993. Introduced with the 3.5 L engine, this design spawned the DOHC 2.7 L Chrysler LH engine, as well as the 3.2 L and 4.0 L variants.

== See also ==
- List of Chrysler engines
