= Toyo Seat =

Toyo Seat Co., Ltd.
- Company type: Limited company
- Industry: Automotive
- Founded: May 1947
- Headquarters: Osaka, Japan
- Key people: Seizo Yamaguchi, President
- Products: automotive parts

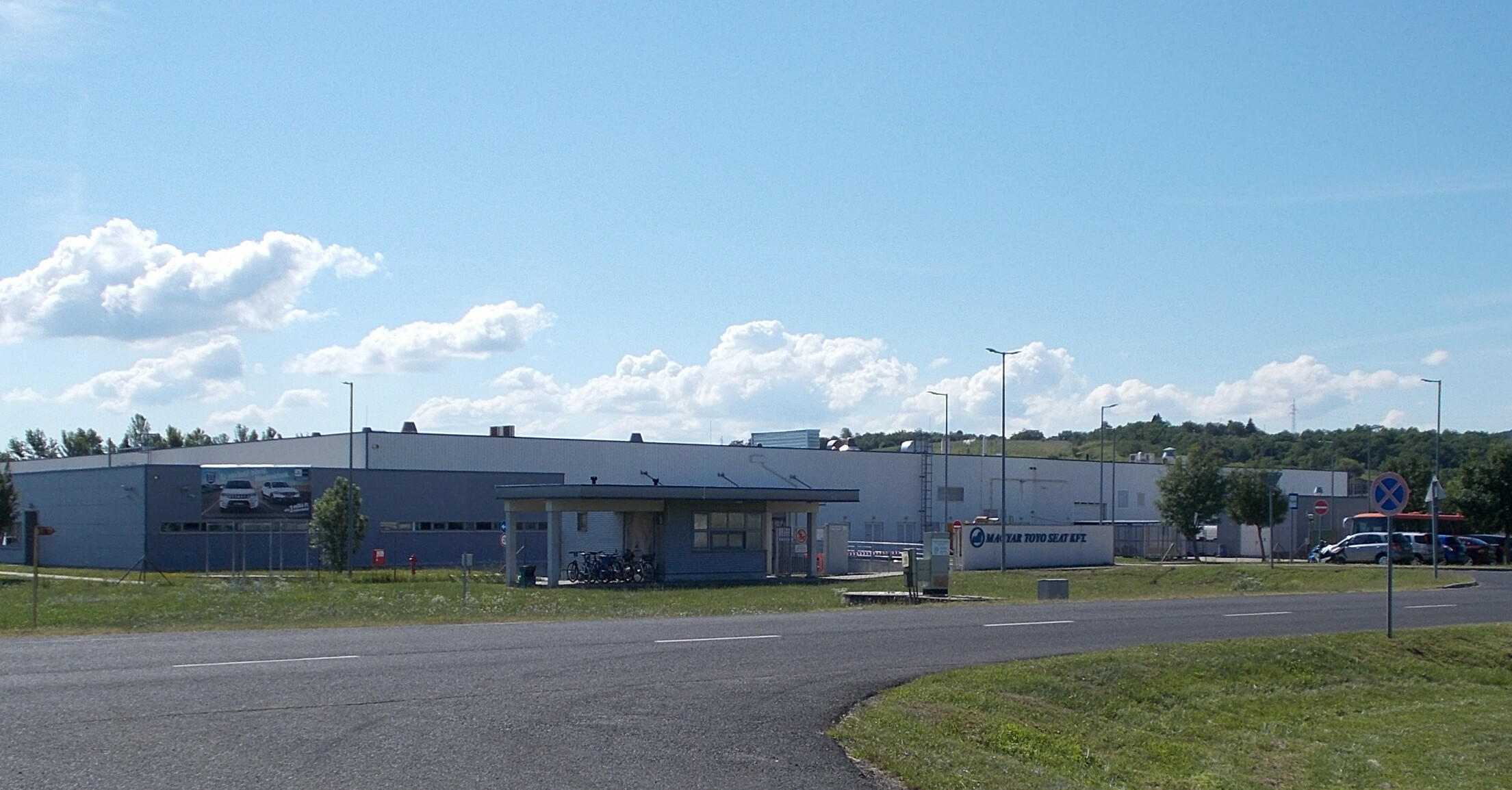
Toyo Seat, branch in Hungary (2020)

Toyo Seat Co., Ltd. is an automotive company based in Japan, founded in May 1947. In January 1988, the company expanded to the United States as Toyo Seat USA Corp. Further sites had been established in Taiwan (China) (1992), Philippines (1998) and Hungary (2002).

Beside soft tops for convertibles and roofmodules, Toyo Seat produces automobile seats, mechanical products, automotive exhaust pipes, door trims, train seats, steel office furniture, health equipment, and other products.

At the end of 2006 Toyo Seat had about 900 employees and a turnover of US$43.2 billion.

One customer of Toyo Seat in Hungary, where about 170 people work, is Suzuki.

In 2019 Toyo Seat US started a joint venture with two more suppliers for the production of seats.

== Production of roofmodules ==
2017 Toyo Seat is under the top five for convertible tops, and end of 2022, too. Toyo Seat produced soft tops for the Mazda MX5 Mark 3 (2005), Honda S2000 Roadster, Nissan Fairlady Z (known in Europe as Nissan 350Z Roadster), Toyota Camry Solara/ Toyota Solara, Toyota MR-S.
