= François Castaing =

French automotive executive (1945–2023)

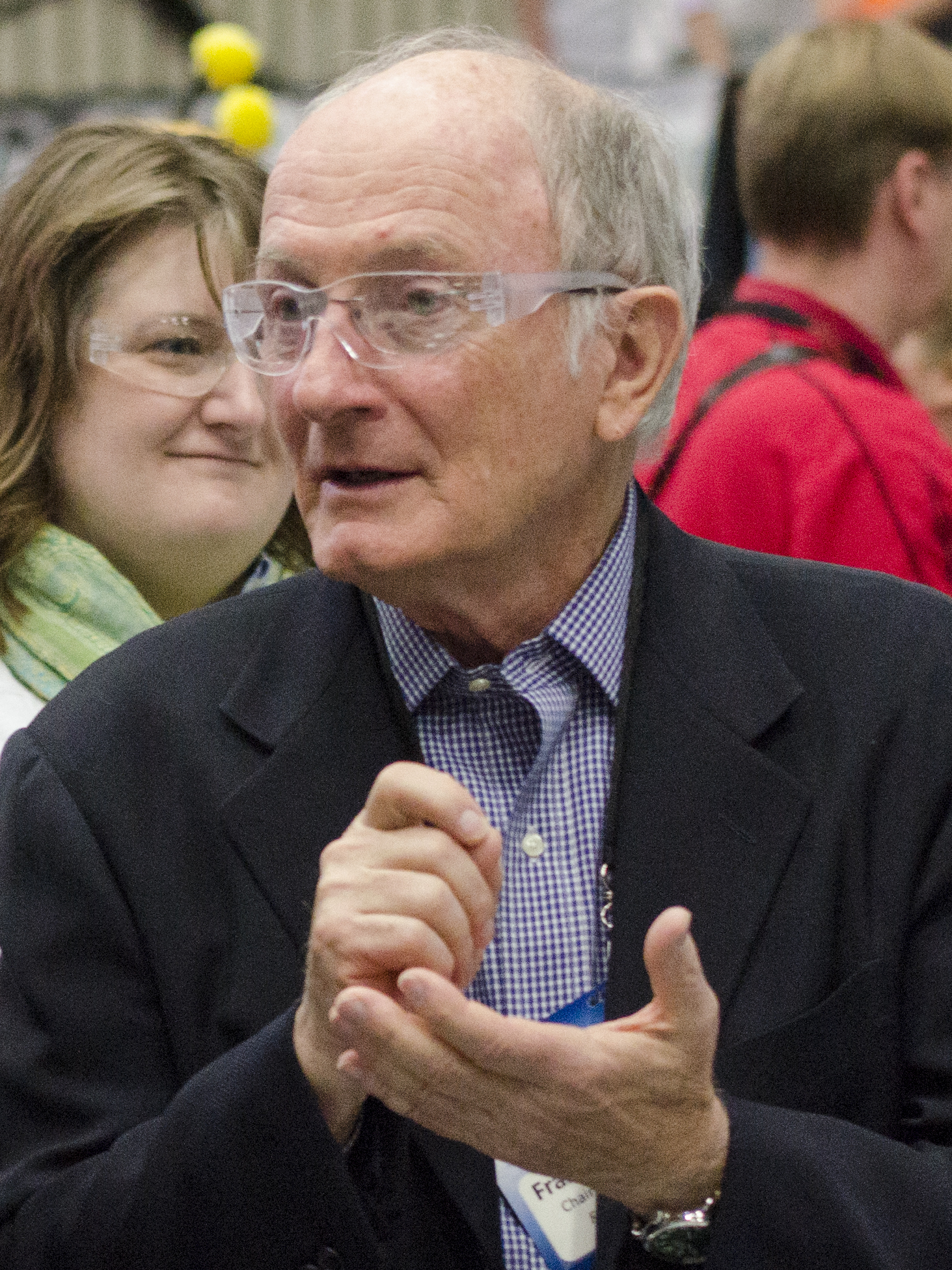
- Castaing in 2016
- Born: François Jean Castaing; 18 March 1945; Marseille, France
- Died: 26 July 2023 (aged 78)
- Education: École Nationale Supérieure d'Arts et Métiers
- Occupation: Automobile industry executive
- Years active: 1968–2000
- Employers: Renault; American Motors Corporation; Chrysler Corporation
- Known for: Product lifecycle management Automobile platform team approach
- Notable work: Jeep Cherokee (XJ); Dodge Intrepid and other LH cars Jeep Grand Cherokee; Dodge Viper
- Awards: Automotive Hall of Fame

François Jean Castaing (French pronunciation: [fʁɑ̃swa ʒɑ̃ kastɛ̃]; 18 March 1945 – 26 July 2023) was a French automotive executive with Renault, American Motors, and Chrysler. He was an engineering graduate from École Nationale Supérieure d'Arts et Métiers in Paris. He worked in Europe for Gordini and Renault before being named vice president for Product Engineering and Development at American Motors Corporation (AMC).

== With Gordini and Renault ==
Castaing started his career in motorsports with Gordini in 1968 working on engines for the 24 Hours of Le Mans. After Renault had taken over Gordini, he advanced to the position of Renault Sport Technical Director. His record of accomplishment with Renault included stints as a member of a racing-engine development team and as director of racing programs. He had joined AMC from Renault, which owned 46% of the company. He and his family moved to Detroit, Michigan, in 1980.

== With AMC and Chrysler ==
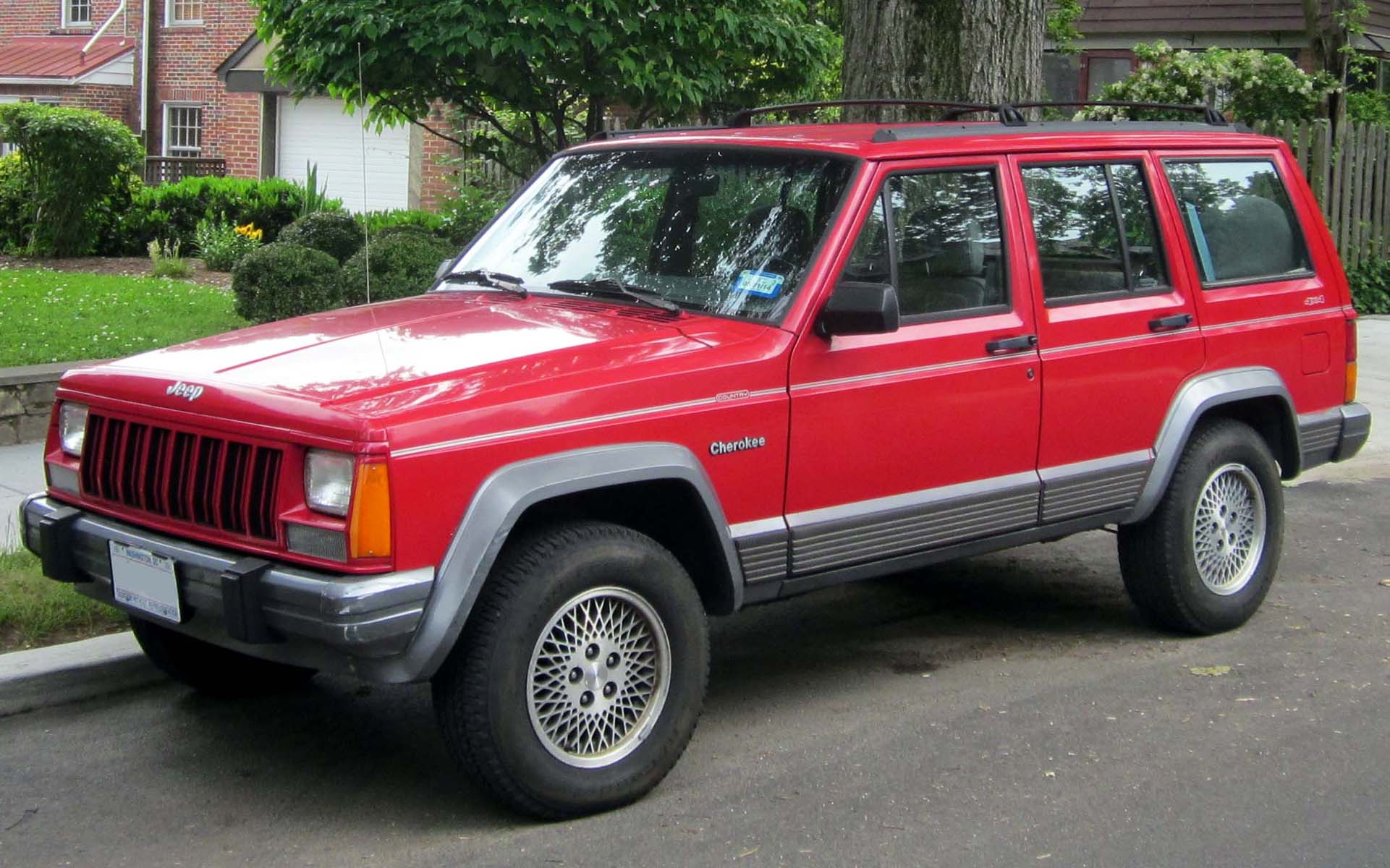
Jeep Cherokee (XJ)

Castaing was responsible for product engineering and development at AMC. He was instrumental in the development of the downsized Jeep Cherokee (XJ), a sport utility vehicle (SUV) that became highly profitable for AMC and thereby helped usher in the modern SUV era. As AMC's vice president for Product Engineering and Development, he also designed a new development approach in which teams of engineers focused on a single type of car platform, working on new models as a system from concept to production. The automaker was looking for a way to speed up its product development process to compete better against its larger competitors in 1985. This differed from the traditional automotive practice of organizing work around departments (such as project planning, design, engineering, manufacturing, and marketing) and components (such as engine, powertrain, and body).

This business process is now known as product lifecycle management (PLM). After introducing its compact Jeep Cherokee (XJ), AMC began development of a new model that later became the Jeep Grand Cherokee (ZJ). The first part in its quest for faster product development was computer-aided design (CAD) software system that makes engineers more productive. The second part in this effort was the new communication system that allowed conflicts to be resolved faster, as well as reducing costly engineering changes because all drawings and documents were in a central database. The product data management was so effective, that after Chrysler purchased AMC, the system was expanded throughout the enterprise connecting everyone involved in designing and building products. While an early adopter of PLM technology, Chrysler was able to become the auto industry's lowest-cost producer, recording development costs that were half of the industry average by the mid-1990s.

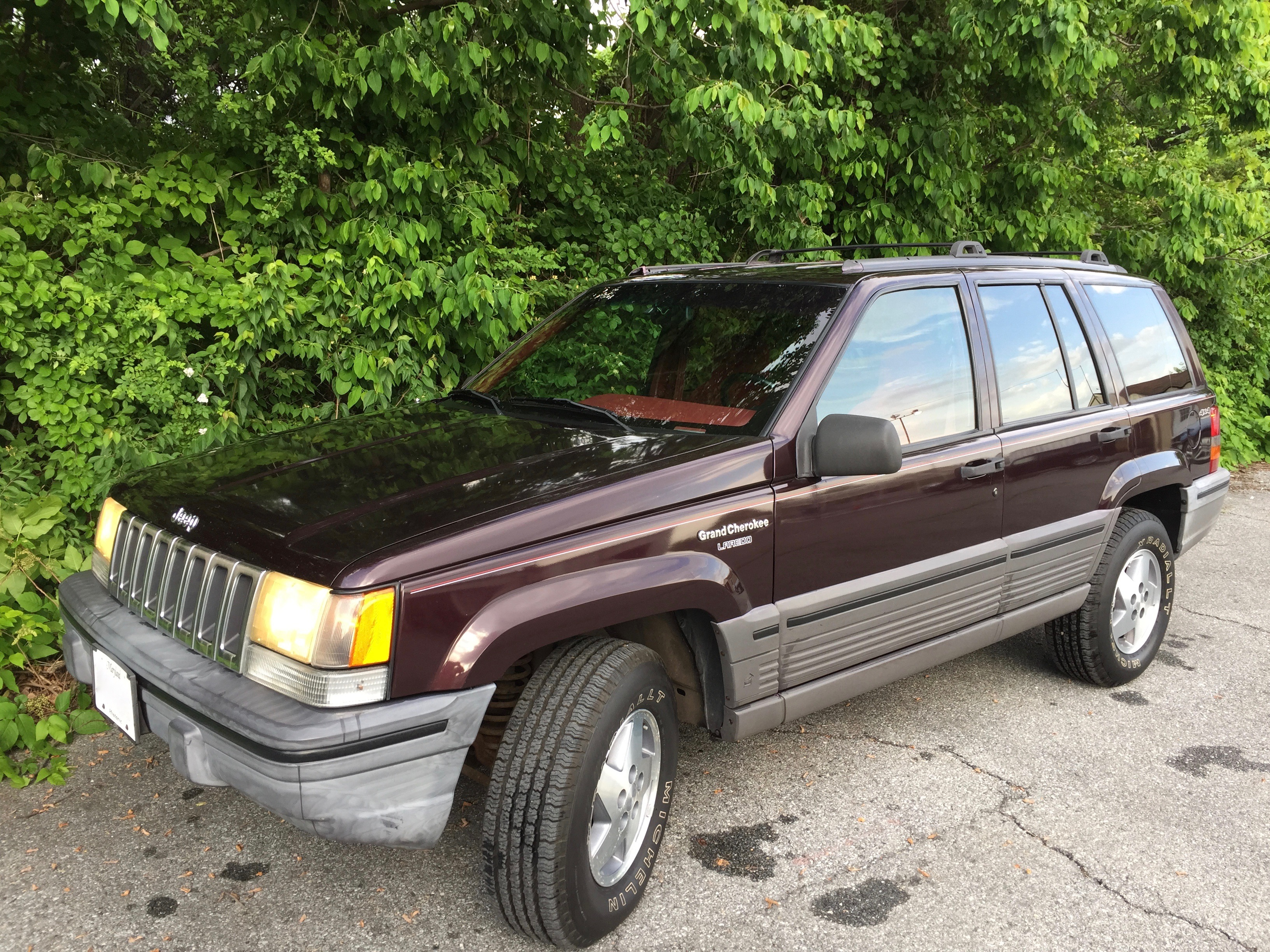
Jeep Grand Cherokee (ZJ) development began at AMC

After AMC's buyout in 1987, Chrysler insiders speculated that AMC would take over the larger firm from within. Part of the reason was that AMC's Jeep Cherokee product line alone soon accounted for more than a third of Chrysler's profits. Several AMC leaders became stars at Chrysler, including product development boss Castaing, who took over Chrysler operations and engineering. He was quickly named Chrysler Motors' new vice president for Vehicle Engineering. The acquiring company was in desperate need to replicate the culture at AMC and Renault, where work was conducted in an atmosphere "of constant change".

Before the purchase of AMC, Chrysler was suffering a five-year product slump following the success of its 1984 minivans. It was mainly making K-car derivatives that looked and drove alike. Chrysler became a producer of smaller cars, thus making it vulnerable to Japanese competitors. Not only was Castaing made Chrysler's point man for fighting the Japanese automakers, but he was also called to engineer a variety of products to fit a growing number of market niches.

Castaing followed the example that was used in AMC's old Amtek technical research and product development center in Detroit. Castaing first suggested the use of these platform teams at Chrysler, it was the automaker's president, Robert Lutz who understood the potential of this change and had the leadership power to make it happen. Castaing realigned Chrysler's 6,000-member engineering structure into teams working on a single platforms. Lutz and Castaing reorganized their departments into AMC-style teams. Castaing also incorporated simultaneous engineering. This team-management approach took shape in the late 1980s. The cross-functional teams for each vehicle were organized across all facets of the company and supplier operations in bringing out new products. "I am a firm believer that teams are the way to improve," said Francois Castaing, vice president for vehicle engineering and a prime mover behind Chrysler's platform-team structure. Bob Lutz described Castaing as a great engineer who was outcome-oriented (versus process-oriented) and passionate with enthusiasm that inspired others. Lutz further reported that he is "exceptionally good constantly doing things that were accepted by the system as being impossible... he loved challenges."

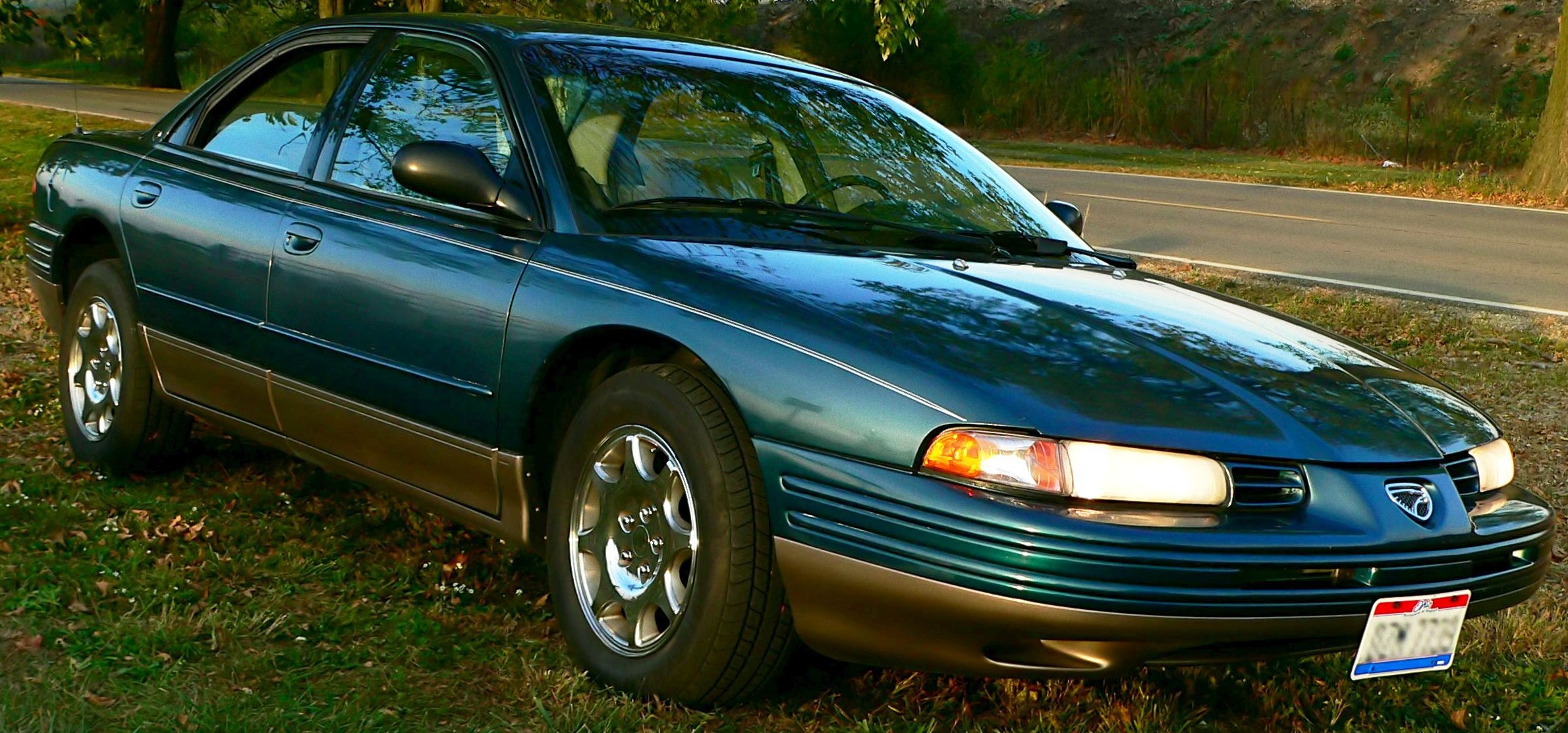
Eagle Vision

At the time of AMC's buyout, Chrysler was designing the replacement for the then-new Dodge Dynasty, a mid-size car. The proposed replacement bore a direct resemblance to the existing Dynasty. However, with the purchase of AMC, a new product design system was instituted, and work began by using AMC's Eagle Premier platform. According to Robert Lutz, the in-house design was scrapped entirely, and the new design, under Castaing's leadership, was selected. The Chrysler LH-cars were the first to use Castaing's platform approach. These new models were produced in a record 39 months, compared to other Chrysler cars that took more than 50 months. The Eagle Vision, Dodge Intrepid, Chrysler Concorde, LHS, and New Yorker were all produced in AMC's state of the art Brampton Assembly plant in Brampton, Ontario, Canada, which was built to make the Eagle Premier.

Castaing is credited with leading the development of new vehicle lines that contributed to Chrysler's growth in the 1990s. He focused on space optimization in minivan design and was praised by Chrysler president Bob Lutz as "the best packager I've ever known." His engineering platform approach drew interest from General Motors and Toyota, and was a factor during Chrysler's eventual merger with Daimler-Benz.

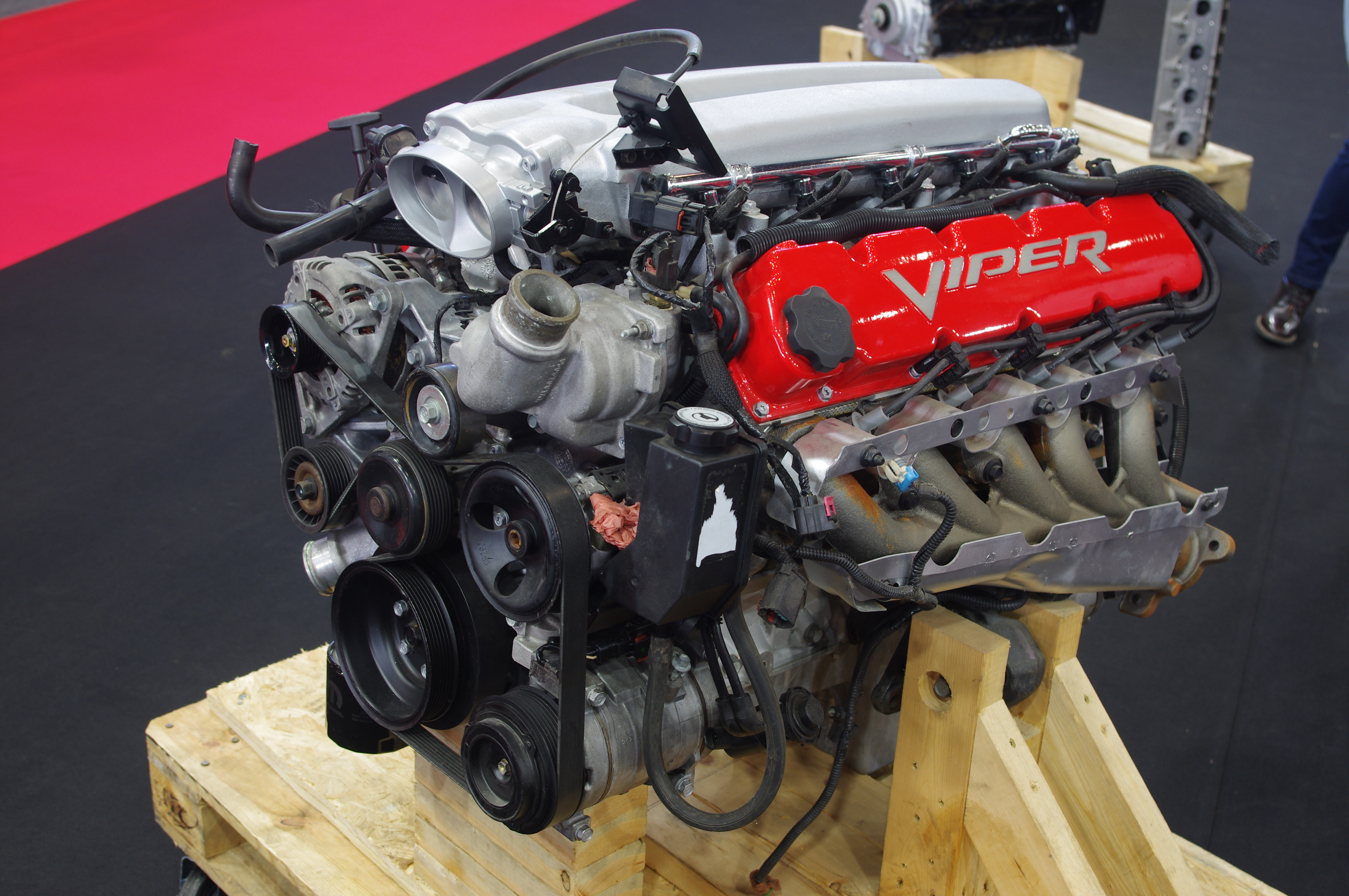
Dodge Viper V10 Engine production began in 1992

In 1993, Castaing founded the United States Council for Automotive Research (USCAR), joining Chrysler with General Motors and Ford. USCAR's goal is to strengthen the technology base of the U.S. auto industry through cooperative research and development. He was also instrumental in establishing the Partnership for a New Generation of Vehicles.

In 1994, Castaing became the head of Chrysler Powertrain Operations. In 1996, he was appointed executive vice president for Chrysler International Operations. After the Daimler-Benz merger with Chrysler in 1998, he served as a technical adviser to Bob Eaton until Eaton's retirement in 2000.

Castaing was among the creators of the sport-utility vehicle trend that propelled the North American automotive industry during the 1990s and has transformed European automobile markets in the early-2000s.

Castaing was also a member of the "Dodge Viper Team", being the Engineering Vice President, and "would prove vital" to the development of the Viper's V10 engine.

== Retirement ==
After leaving DaimlerChrysler, Castaing served on the boards of directors of multiple manufacturing and automotive companies, including Exide, the battery company, Durakon Industries, NextEnergy, Reynard Motorsport, and Valeo. He also served on the board of the Federation of American Scientists. In 2004, TRW Automotive Holdings announced the election of Castaing to the company's board of directors. He also served on the audit committee of Amerigon (now Gentherm Incorporated).

In 1998, Castaing became chairman of the New Detroit Science Center for the education of future generations. Under his leadership, a $30 million capital campaign for the expansion and renovation of the Detroit Science Center was launched, ultimately permitting the center to reopen to the public in 2001 with dramatically expanded exhibition space. Castaing resigned from his post in January 2012, as the center closed due to various financial problems. Castaing has continued to leverage his ties to the automobile industry to promote science and engineering education.

From 1994, Castaing also served on the board of directors of For Inspiration and Recognition of Science and Technology (FIRST). This is the robotics competition for high school students created by inventor and entrepreneur Dean Kamen.

== Death ==
François Castaing died on 26 July 2023, at the age of 78.

== Recognition ==
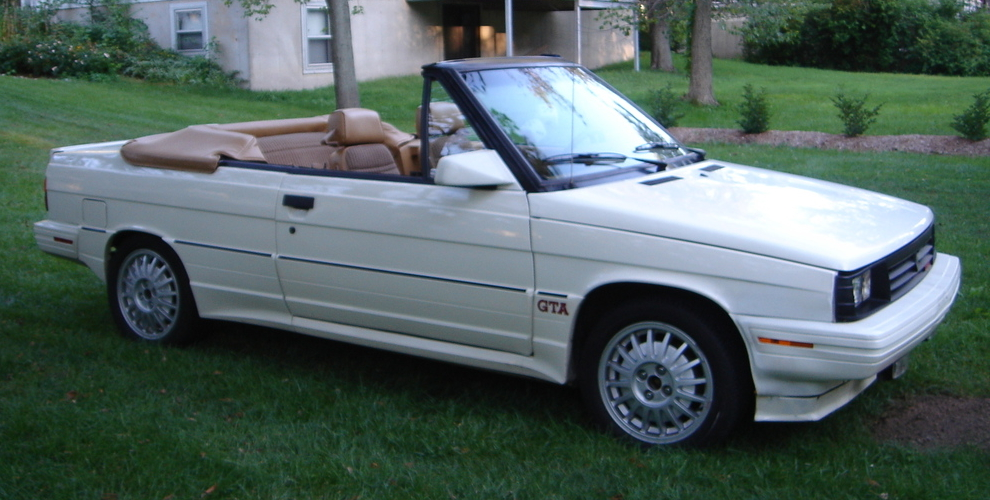
1987 Renault Alliance GTA – US market

Castaing was named "Man of the Year" by the French publication Le Journal de l'Automobile for his exemplary success in the United States. He was noted for developing the Renault-AMC structure, the launching of Renault Alliance and Encore (Renault 9 & 11), for being the father of the Jeep Cherokee (XJ), as well as being one of the craftsmen of the rescue of Chrysler.

Castaing was elected a member of the United States National Academy of Engineering in 1995 for the development of highly reliable, high-performance automobiles and for their successful production through innovative organizational structures. Castaing was also chosen as a fellow of the Society of Automotive Engineers (SAE) that "recognizes and honors long-term members who have made a significant impact on society's mobility technology through leadership, research, and innovation."

Castaing was posthumously inducted into the Automotive Hall of Fame on 12 October 2010 in Dearborn, Michigan.
