= USCAR =

USCAR means:

- United States Council for Automotive Research
- United States Climate Action Report
- United States Civil Administration of the Ryukyu Islands
