= Ford Prodigy =

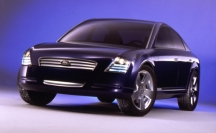

Overview
- Type: Concept car
- Manufacturer: Ford Motor Company
- Production: 2000

Body and chassis
- Body style: 4-door sedan
- Layout: diesel-electric hybrid

The Ford Prodigy is a low emission vehicle 72 mpg-US (3.3 L/100 km; 86 mpg-imp) diesel-hybrid concept car built in 2000 by Ford and aimed at establishing U.S. leadership in the development of extremely fuel-efficient (up to 80 mpg_{‑US} (2.9 L/100 km; 96 mpg_{‑imp})) vehicles while retaining the features that make them marketable and affordable. It was introduced at the North American International Auto Show, as part of the Partnership for a New Generation of Vehicles with the rest of the 'Big Three' automobile manufacturers and the US Government. It was eventually sold at the 2010 RM Sports and Classics of Monterey event. It was in the collection of the Sarasota Classic Car Museum until it closed in 2023.
