= Dodge Intrepid =

Large-sized car model produced by Dodge

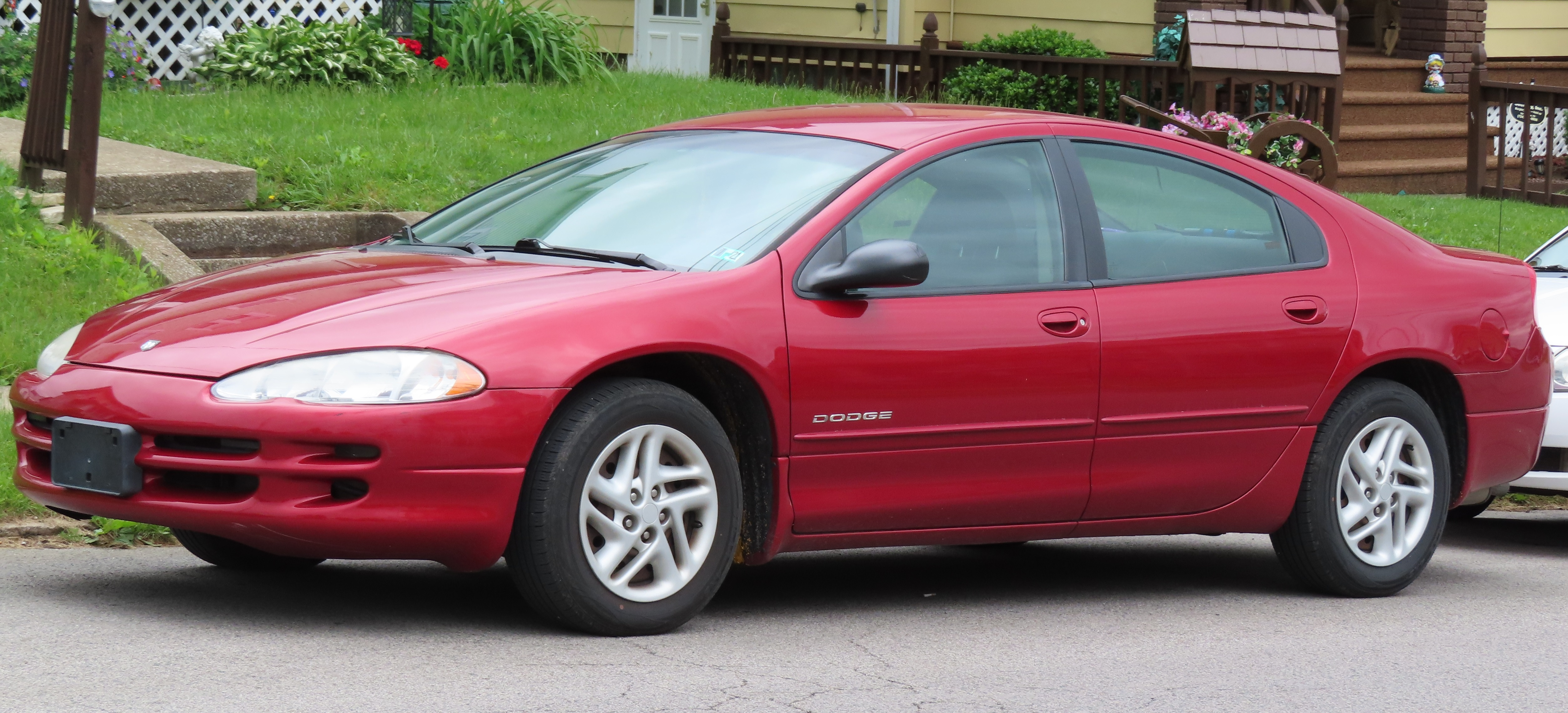

Overview
- Manufacturer: Dodge Division of Chrysler Corporation (1992–1998); DaimlerChrysler (1998–2004)
- Also called: Chrysler Intrepid (Canada)
- Production: 1992–2003
- Model years: 1993–2004
- Assembly: Canada: Brampton, Ontario (Brampton Assembly); United States: Newark, Delaware (Newark Assembly)

Body and chassis
- Class: Full-size car
- Body style: 4-door sedan
- Layout: Longitudinal front-engine, front-wheel drive
- Platform: Chrysler LH platform

Chronology
- Predecessor: Dodge Monaco (United States); Dodge Dynasty
- Successor: Dodge Charger (2006); Chrysler 300 (United States and Canada)

The Dodge Intrepid is a full-sized front-wheel drive four-door sedan that Dodge produced for the 1993 to 2004 model years. It is related to the Chrysler 300M, Chrysler Concorde, Chrysler LHS, Chrysler New Yorker, and Eagle Vision, all of which were built on Chrysler's new "cab forward" LH platform.

The Intrepid was sold in Canada as the Chrysler Intrepid. In the United States, it replaced the Dodge Monaco as Dodge's largest passenger car. With Dodge's introduction to Mexico at that time, it was badged as a Dodge, replacing the Dynasty, which had been sold there under the Chrysler brand.

== Background ==
=== Styling ===
The Intrepid's design dates back to 1986, when designer Kevin Verduyn completed the initial exterior design of a new aerodynamic-concept sedan called Navajo, but the design never passed the clay model stage. It was also at this time that the Chrysler Corporation purchased bankrupt Italian sports car manufacturer Lamborghini. The Navajo's exterior design was reworked and became the Lamborghini Portofino, although Chrysler's design team retained control over the final version of the car. Using the chassis of the Lamborghini Jalpa, the concept car was built by Sergio Coggiola in Turin and shown at the 1987 Frankfurt Auto Show. Lamborghini described the design of the Portofino concept "big potato".

The styling was opposite to the wedge revolution at the time from Lamborghini and characterized by soft curves everywhere. The Portofino was heralded as a design triumph, setting in motion Chrysler's decision to produce a production sedan with the Portofino's revolutionary exterior design, called "cab forward". The wheels were pushed to the corners of the car, creating a much larger passenger cabin than those of its contemporaries.

=== Chassis ===
Design of the chassis began in the late 1980s, after Chrysler had bought American Motors Corporation (AMC) in 1987. During this time, Chrysler began designing a replacement for the then-new Dodge Dynasty, a mid-size car. Initial proposals resembled the Dynasty, but this design approach was scrapped entirely in 1988 by François Castaing, the former AMC vice president of product engineering and development. As Chrysler purchased AMC, Castaing became the new Vice President for Vehicle Engineering for the new company. The acquiring automaker was in desperate need of replicating the AMC and Renault corporate culture where work was conducted in an atmosphere "of constant change". Castaing organized Chrysler's departments into AMC-style cross-functional teams, as well as incorporated the use of simultaneous engineering. Moreover, the new vehicle's design, under Castaing's leadership, began with the Eagle Premier platform.

The Premier's longitudinal engine-mounting layout was inherited, as were the front suspension geometry and parts of the braking system. The chassis itself became a flexible architecture capable of supporting front- or rear-wheel drive (designated "LH" and "LX" respectively). The chassis design was continually refined over the following years, as it underpinned additional Chrysler prototypes: the 1989 Chrysler Millennium and the 1990 Eagle Optima. The transmission was inspired by the Premier's Audi and ZF automatics. Borrowing heavily from Chrysler's A604 (41TE) "Ultradrive" transversely mounted automatic, it became the A606 (also known as 42LE). The initial standard 3.3 L pushrod V6 engine was joined in 1990 by a 3.5 L SOHC engine with four valves per cylinder. For the second-generation Intrepid R/T, the block was recast in aluminum as part of a comprehensive upgrade.

== First generation (1993–1997) ==
First generation
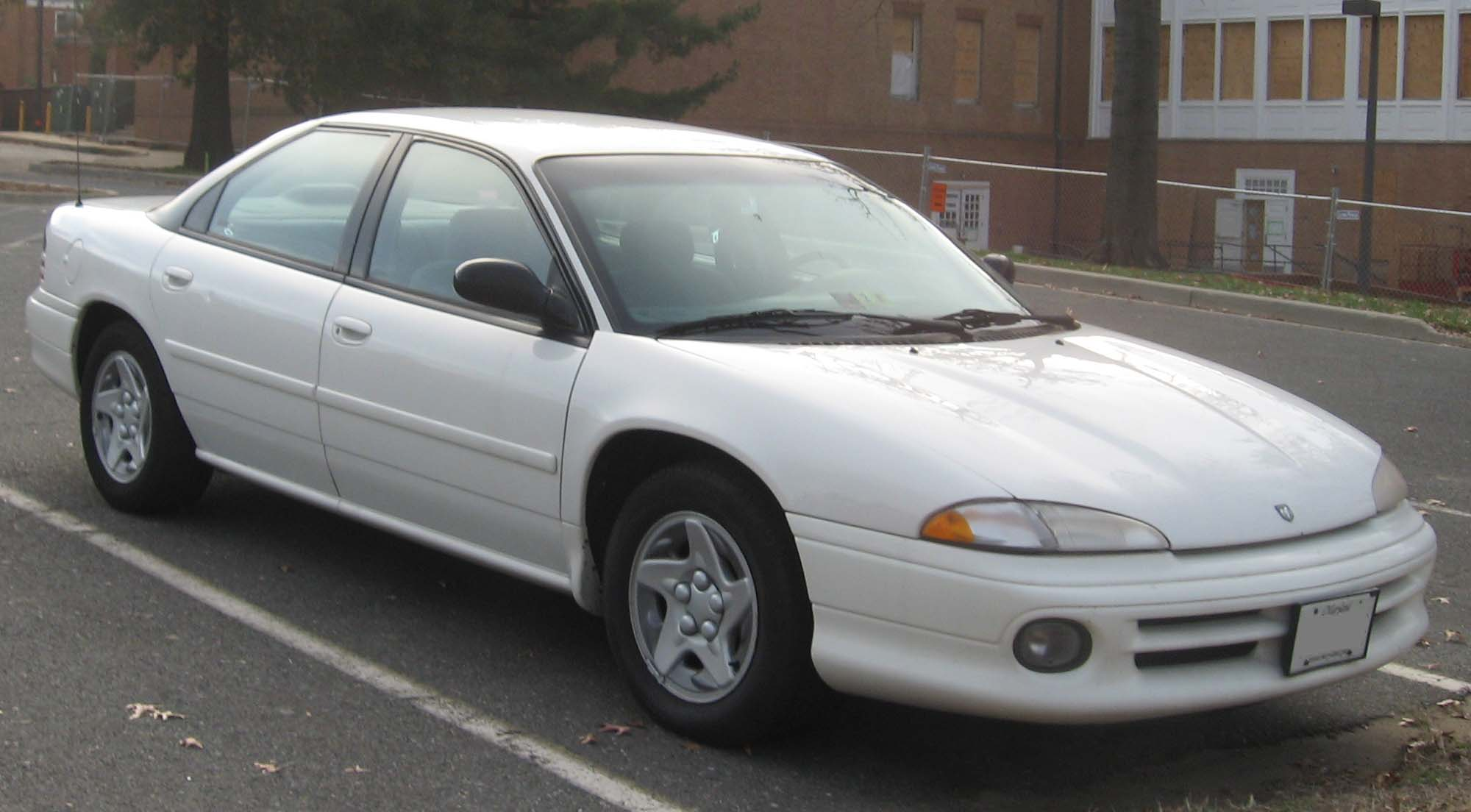

Overview
- Production: June 1992–August 1997
- Assembly: Brampton Assembly, Brampton, Canada; Newark Assembly, Newark, Delaware, U.S.
- Designer: Kevin Verduyn (1988)

Body and chassis
- Related: Chrysler LHS; Chrysler Concorde; Chrysler New Yorker; Eagle Vision

Powertrain
- Engine: 3.3 L EGA V6; 3.5 L EGE V6
- Transmission: 4-speed 42LE automatic

Dimensions
- Wheelbase: 113 in (2,870 mm)
- Length: 1993–94: 201.7 in (5,123 mm); 1995–97: 201.8 in (5,126 mm)
- Width: 74.4 in (1,890 mm)
- Height: 56.3 in (1,430 mm)
- Curb weight: 3,318 lb (1,505 kg)

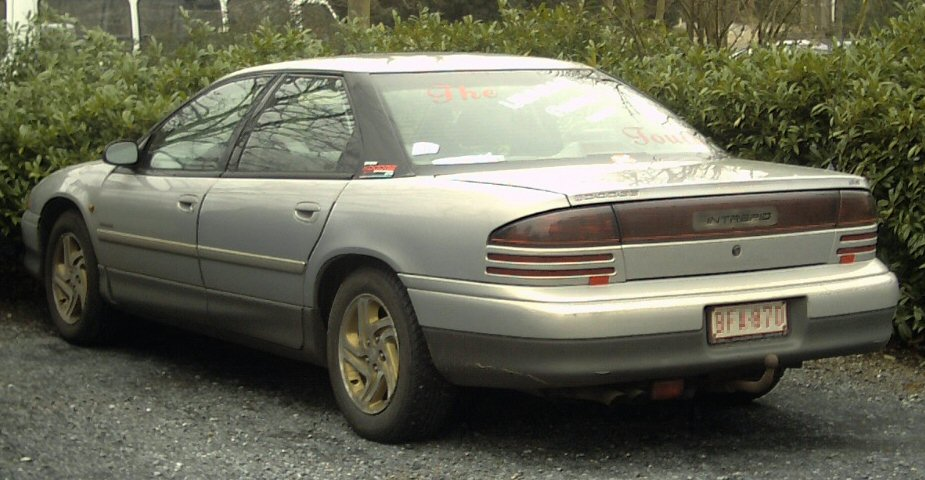
Rear view

The first generation of LH cars debuted at the 1992 North American International Auto Show in Detroit as three 1993 models: the Chrysler Concorde, Dodge Intrepid (badged as a Chrysler in Canada), and the Eagle Vision (also badged as a Chrysler in Europe).

The Intrepid was available in two trim levels: base and the sportier, better-equipped ES, which added four-wheel disc brakes, 16-inch wheels with better tires, and stiffer "touring" suspension damping. All Intrepids received driver and front passenger airbags, a rarity at the time, as well as air conditioning and the four-speed automatic transmission. Anti-lock brakes were optional, as was traction control and the more powerful 3.5 L SOHC engine rated at (214 hp).

The Intrepid's launch marked a new image for the Dodge brand, which began to market itself as "The New Dodge" with a marketing campaign featuring actor Edward Herrmann, who would go on to serve as the brand's spokesperson for the rest of the decade.

Changes were few over the Intrepid's initial five-year production. A new variable-assist power steering rack replaced the original for 1994, allowing for easier parking while maintaining a firmer feel at speed. The touring suspension tuning was also made standard equipment in the base model this year. Anti-lock brakes were made standard in the ES in 1995, and in 1996 a new manual shift function for the automatic transmission, called Autostick, was inherited from the Eagle Vision TSi: the first transmission of its kind available in a mainstream car. In addition, Chrysler updated the Dodge Intrepid for the 1995 model year, adding the previous Dodge Ram logo, which was used from 1994 to 2009. Each exterior treatment uses a hoodline and chrome accented daytime running lights with body colored accents. The Intrepid was often compared with the Chevrolet Lumina and Ford Taurus, and to a lesser extent, the Toyota Camry, Nissan Maxima, and Honda Accord.

Intrepids were built at American Motors' Brampton Assembly facility, originally established to manufacture the Eagle Premier, in Brampton, Ontario, Canada; and at the Chrysler plant at Newark, Delaware.

Production Figures
	Yearly Total
1993	70,046
1994	128,190
1995	150,474
1996	145,167
1997	151,404
Total 1st-generation	645,281

== Second generation (1998–2004) ==
Second generation
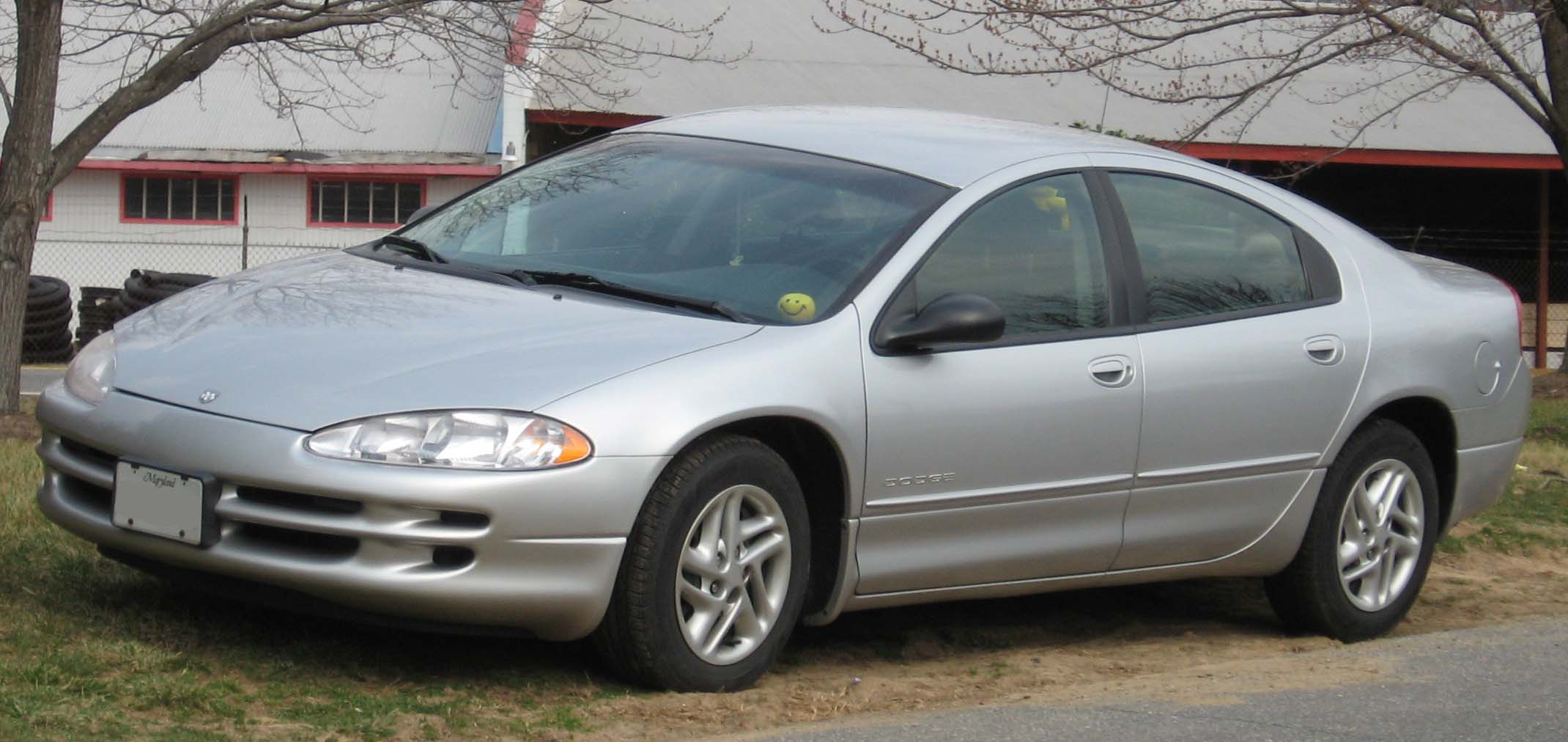

Overview
- Production: September 1997 – August 30, 2003
- Assembly: Brampton Assembly in Brampton, Ontario, Canada
- Designer: Bob Boniface (1993, 1994)

Body and chassis
- Related: Chrysler LHS; Chrysler 300M; Chrysler Concorde

Powertrain
- Engine: 2.7 L EER V6; 3.2 L EGW V6; 3.5 L EGJ V6; 3.5 L EGG V6
- Transmission: 4-speed 42LE automatic

Dimensions
- Wheelbase: 113 in (2,870 mm)
- Length: 203.7 in (5,174 mm)
- Width: 2000–01: 74.6 in (1,895 mm); 1998–99 & 2002–04: 74.7 in (1,897 mm)
- Height: 55.9 in (1,420 mm)
- Curb weight: 3,422 lb (1,552 kg)

The LH cars were redesigned for the 1998 model year, with the Intrepid being designed by Robert Boniface and taking 31 months from design freeze to commencement. The engines were replaced by two new all-aluminum units: a DOHC 2.7 L (2736 cc), 200 hp (149 kW) V6 for base models, and a SOHC 3.2 L (3231 cc), 225 hp (168 kW) V6 for the ES. A new, top-of-the-line R/T model was added in 1999, the centerpiece of which was a redesigned version of the 3.5 L (3518 cc) V6, now producing 242 hp (180 kW) and 234 hp (174 kW) for the ES. At the same time the 3.2 L was reduced to an option in the ES. The Intrepid was completely redesigned for the 1998 model year, arriving in showrooms during late 1997. Body shells were designed to be stronger and stiffer, as well as incorporating double-shear suspension mounts and integrated side impact protection.

- MY1999: Minor changes to interior panels. The Chrysler Sentry Key theft-deterrent system disabled the ignition unless the proper key was used to start the engine.
- MY2000: New variable-assist steering, and an optional four-disc in-dash CD changer.
- MY2002: The 3.2 L engine was discontinued, and new wheel covers became available. The R/T received an extra 2 hp (1 kW) from PCM programming changes to produce 244 hp (182 kW) on 89-octane fuel. This was also the year when DaimlerChrysler began cost-cutting that led to the deletion of various features from the Intrepid. Most notable were the deletion of the illuminated headlight switch, illuminated traction control switch, illuminated lock and window switches, door courtesy lights (replaced with red reflectors), illuminated ashtray receptacle, trunk lid liner, armrest power outlet, door emblems, driver's seat map pocket, and the blacked-out front fascia paint scheme.
- MY2003: No major changes were made except the optional four-disc in-dash CD changer was replaced with the optional six-disc in-dash CD changer. The R/T was discontinued in 2003, but a new SXT model kept the 3.5 L High Output engine with an increase to a 250 hp (186 kW) rating. The SXT moniker was eventually used across the Dodge product line as a trim level. The Intrepid SXT was basically a base model Intrepid SE with the 3.5 H.O. engine taken from the R/T, with some "sportier" features such as a sunroof and spoiler. It was a value trim model actually classified as an ES (SXT), but had less features than the ES did with a more powerful engine.
- MY2004: Popularity of the Intrepid waned over its 12-year lifespan. The cab-forward design, revolutionary in 1993, had become ubiquitous, culminating in the Intrepid's cancellation.

All Intrepids were built at AMC's former assembly plant, originally used to manufacture the Eagle Premier, in Brampton, Ontario, Canada. They were replaced by the new rear wheel drive LX vehicles; the 2005 Dodge Magnum and 2006 Dodge Charger.

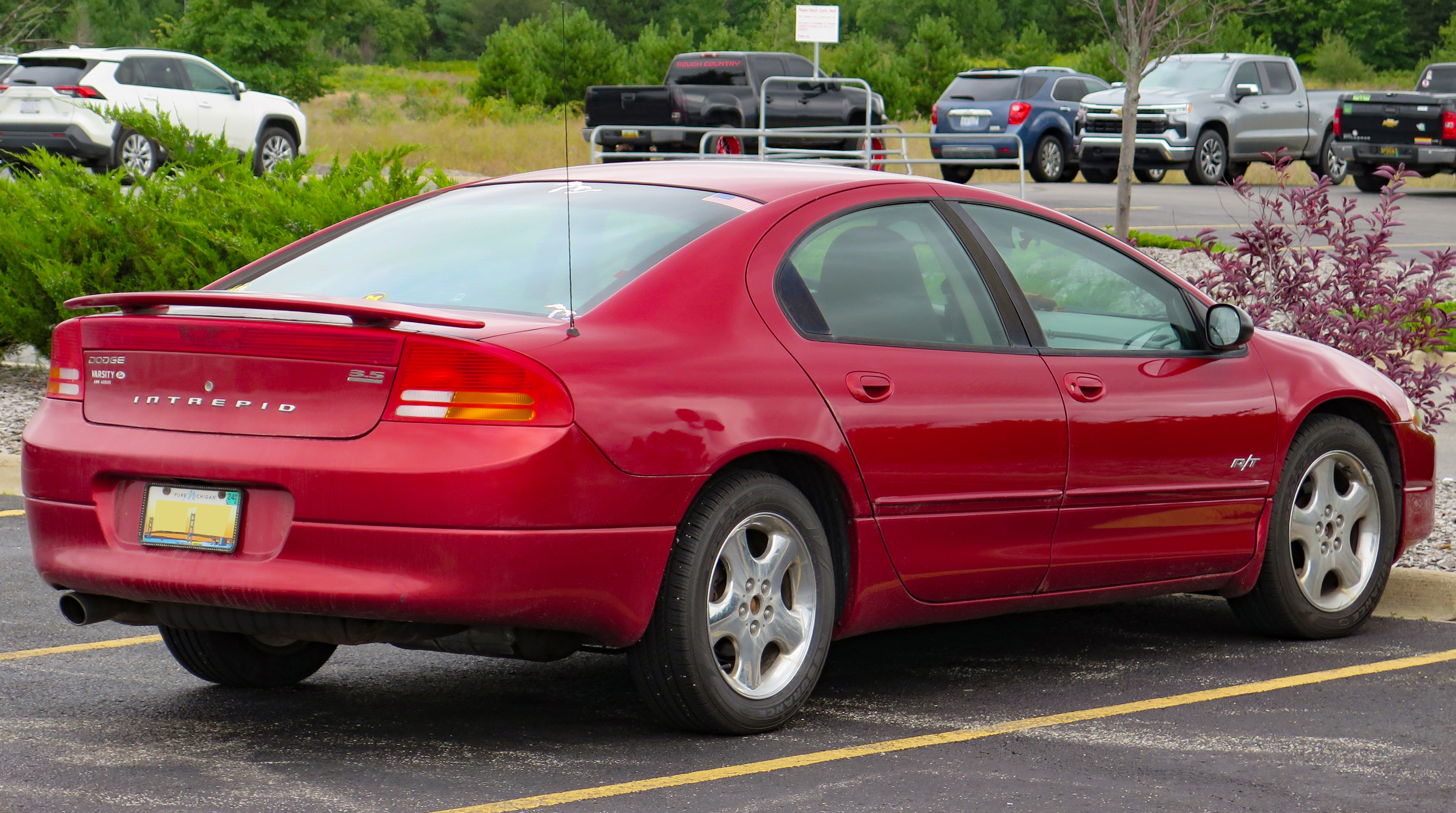
Rear view (2002)

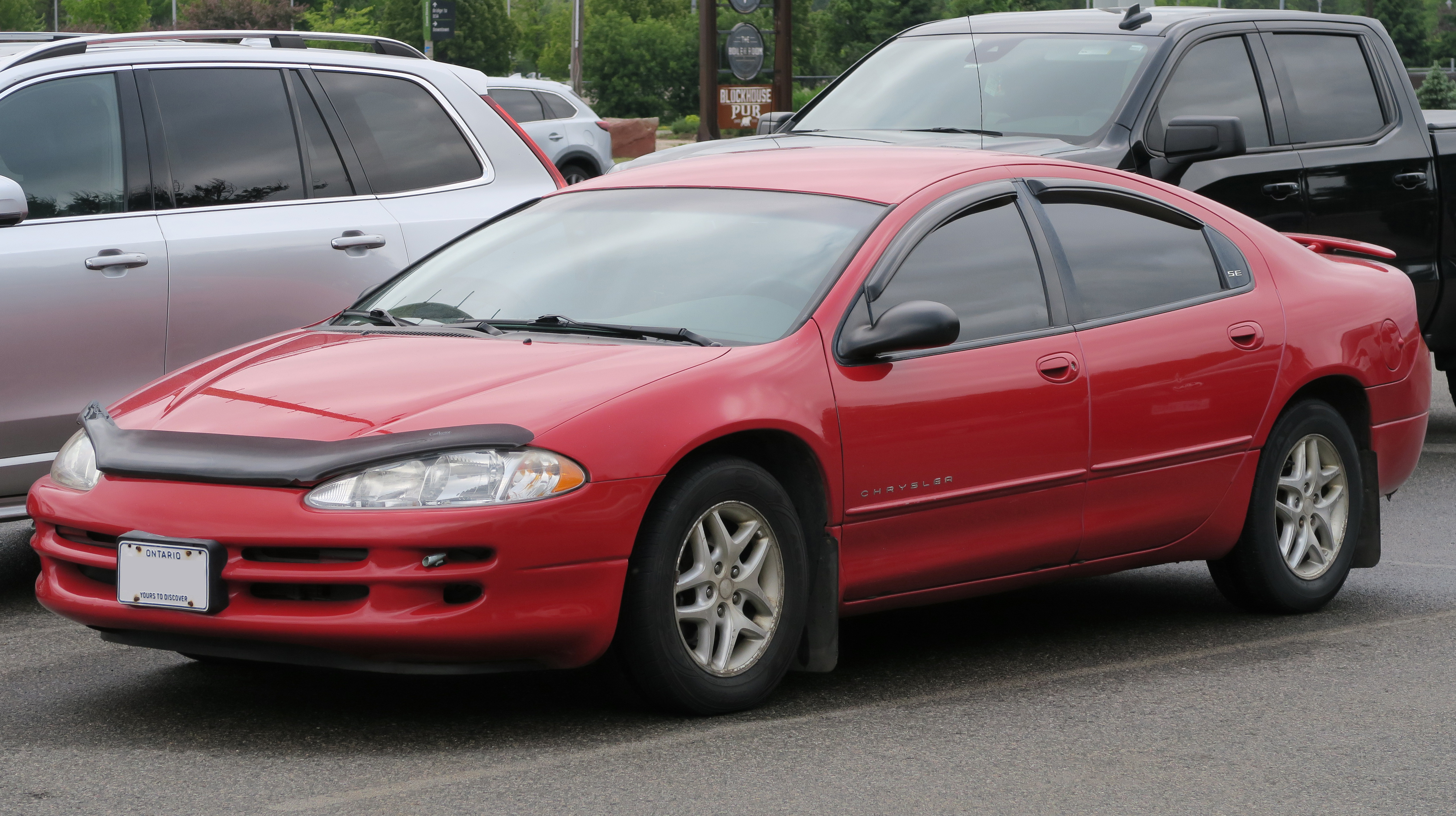
2001 Chrysler Intrepid SE (Canada)

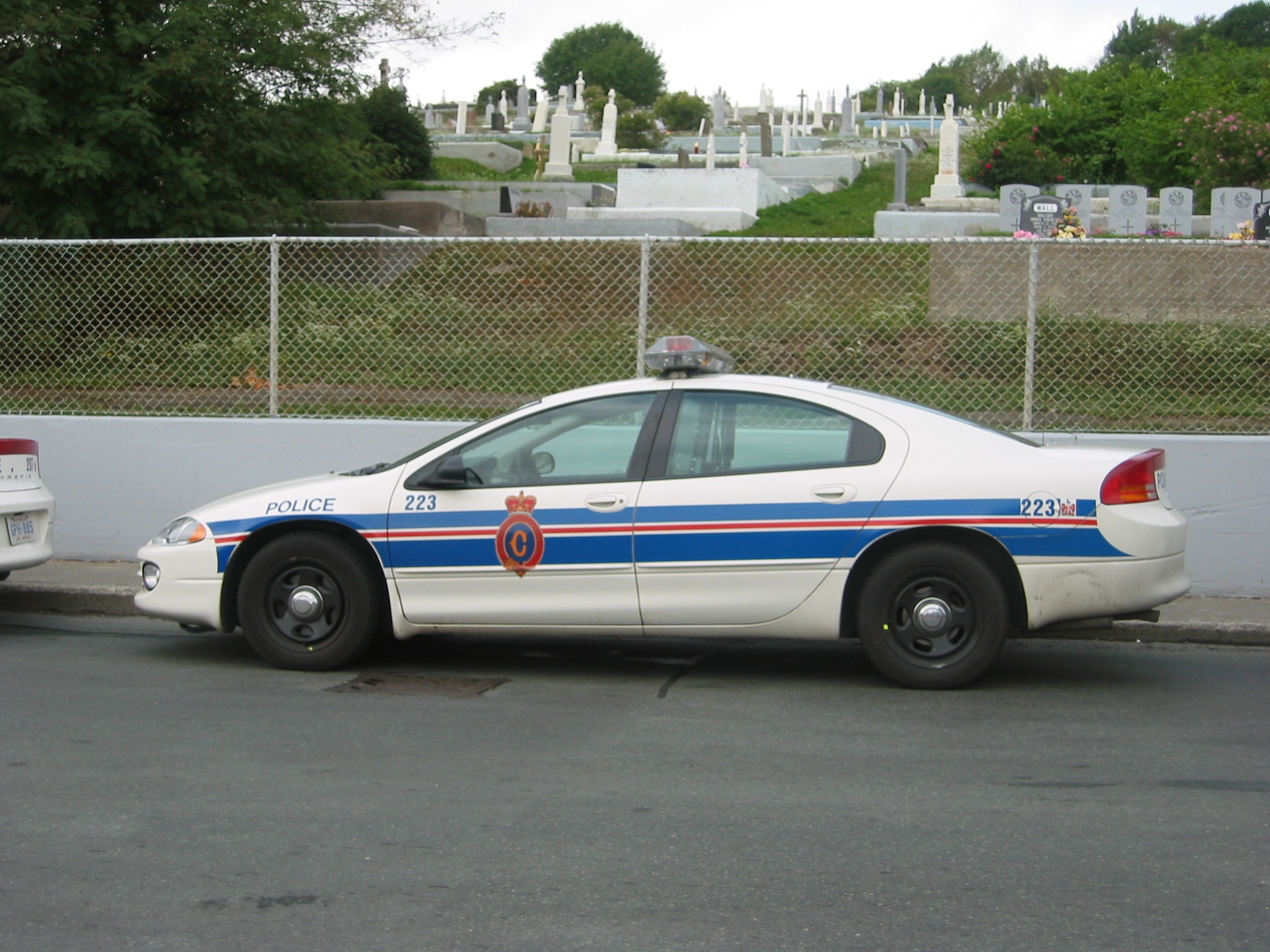
2003 Intrepid police car with the Royal Newfoundland Constabulary

=== Fleet sales ===
The second generation was marketed to the commercial and government markets, particularly the base (1998-2000) and SE (2001-2004) trim levels. An Intrepid Police Package was sold from 2002 to 2004, similar to the earlier rear-wheel drive Chevrolet Caprice or Ford Crown Victoria. These packages had distinctive styling differences (such as small hub caps) and additional wiring to support strobes and flashers in the trunk compartment and in the front by the grille. The 3.5 V6 found in the R/T & SXT was standard in the police package. These packages and some non-police (non-commercial) packages featured plastic front-end intake vents that routed air onto the rotors for additional cooling and stopping power.

=== Engines ===
- 1997–2004 - 2.7 L V6 200 hp (149 kW)
- 1997–2001 - 3.2 L V6 225 hp (168 kW)
- 1999–2004 - 3.5 L V6 234 hp (174 kW)
- 1999–2001 - 3.5 L HO V6 242 hp (180 kW)
- 2001–2003 - 3.5 L HO V6 244 hp (182 kW)
- 2003–2004 - 3.5 L HO V6 250 hp (186 kW)

=== Motorsport ===
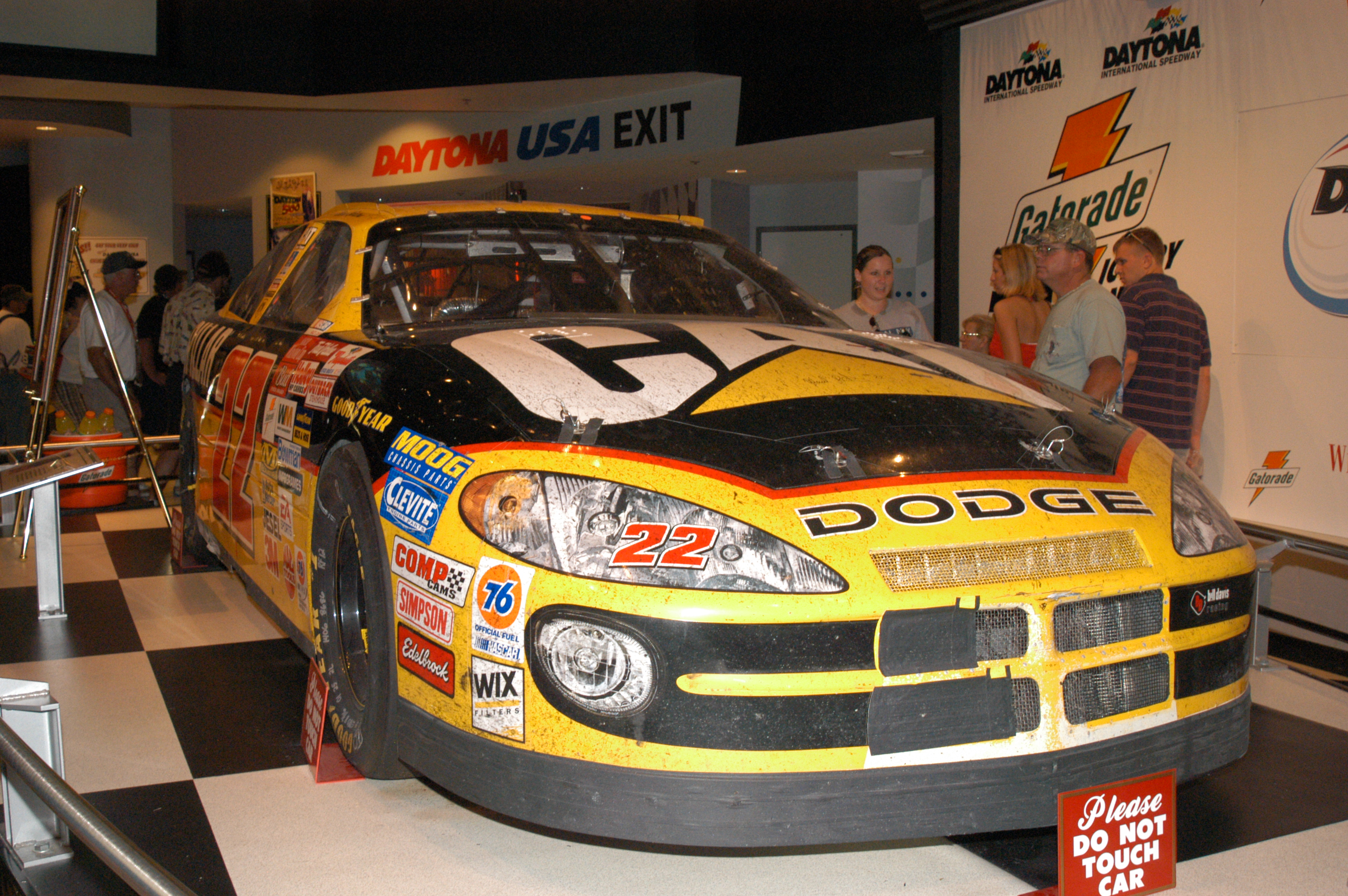
Intrepid in NASCAR in 2002.

In 2001, the Intrepid made its debut on the NASCAR circuit, signifying the return of Dodge to NASCAR competition after a 16-year hiatus. Drivers in the initial Dodge campaign included Bill Elliott, Kasey Kahne, Jason Leffler, Ward Burton, Sterling Marlin, John Andretti, Casey Mears, Jamie McMurray, Buckshot Jones, Kyle Petty, Stacy Compton, Dave Blaney, Jeremy Mayfield, and Casey Atwood. Marlin was the first to win in an Intrepid, giving the Dodge marque its first victory since Neil Bonnett's 1977 win at Ontario. The Intrepid continued in NASCAR until 2005 when Dodge switched to the Charger.

== Hybrid electric concepts ==
In the late 1990s, Chrysler used the Intrepid as a research platform for a hybrid electric vehicle in a diesel-electric configuration. Development was under the U.S. government-backed Partnership for a New Generation of Vehicles (PNGV).

Three variations were built, the Intrepid ESX, ESX II, and ESX III. The first vehicle was built in a series hybrid configuration, while the next two were considered mild hybrids. These were attempted in the time frame of 1997 to 1998.

The PNGV set an ambitious goal for vehicles capable of 80 mpg_{‑US} (3 L/100 km; 96 mpg_{‑imp}), but the first outcome in 1996 achieved an estimated 55 mpg_{‑US} (4 L/100 km; 66 mpg_{‑imp}). The ESX I was based on the existing Intrepid production model and used a exotic materials. It was estimated that the car would cost $80,000, or roughly $60,000 more than a regular Intrepid. Part of this price increase was caused by the use of lead-acid batteries.

The ESX II team set a somewhat more modest goal of 70 mpg_{‑US} (3 L/100 km; 84 mpg_{‑imp}). The vehicle was made much lighter than normal by using an aluminum frame and carbon fiber composite material. This version only cost around $37,000, or about $15,000 more than a standard Intrepid. This version used nickel metal hydride batteries.

The third vehicle, the ESX III, achieved an estimated 72 mpg_{‑US} (3 L/100 km; 86 mpg_{‑imp}). It used lightweight materials, such as injection-molded thermoplastic. The experimental car weighed only 2,250 lb (1,021 kg) and could accelerate from 0 to 60 mph in about 11 seconds. The estimated cost was only about $7,500 more than a standard vehicle, which would give a total somewhere around $30,000. The ESX III used lithium ion batteries.

== Trim levels ==
- Base – 1993–2000
- ES – 1993–2004
- Motorsports Edition - 2001
- SE – 2001–2004
- Sport – 1995–1997
- R/T – 1999–2002
- SXT – 2002–2004
- SST - 2002–2003

== Awards ==
The Intrepid and Concorde were on Car and Driver magazine's Ten Best list for 1993 and 1994. The second-generation Intrepid again made the list for 1998 and 1999. Both generations won Consumer Guide's "Best Buy" award.

== Oil sludge ==
Some second-generation 2.7 L V6 engines have suffered from failures due to oil sludge contamination. In February 2009, five separate class action lawsuits related to the alleged oil sludge defect were consolidated to the District of New Jersey. These problems happen when fine engine oil passages become clogged with sludge, and often result in catastrophic failure of the engine. An unknown number of Intrepid owners have been affected. Fixes include changing to synthetic oil, inspection, and even engine replacement. During the Chrysler bankruptcy proceedings, there was concern among consumer advocate groups that Chrysler's proposed "free and clear" sale of assets to "New Chrysler" would allow the automaker to avoid liability for the oil sludge defect.
