= USABC =

USABC may refer to:

- US-ASEAN Business Council, leading advocacy organization for U.S businesses working in Southeast Asia
- U.S. Advanced Battery Consortium LLC, an industry group operated by Chrysler, Ford, and General Motors as part of the United States Council for Automotive Research
