= Ford Reflex =

Ford Reflex Concept
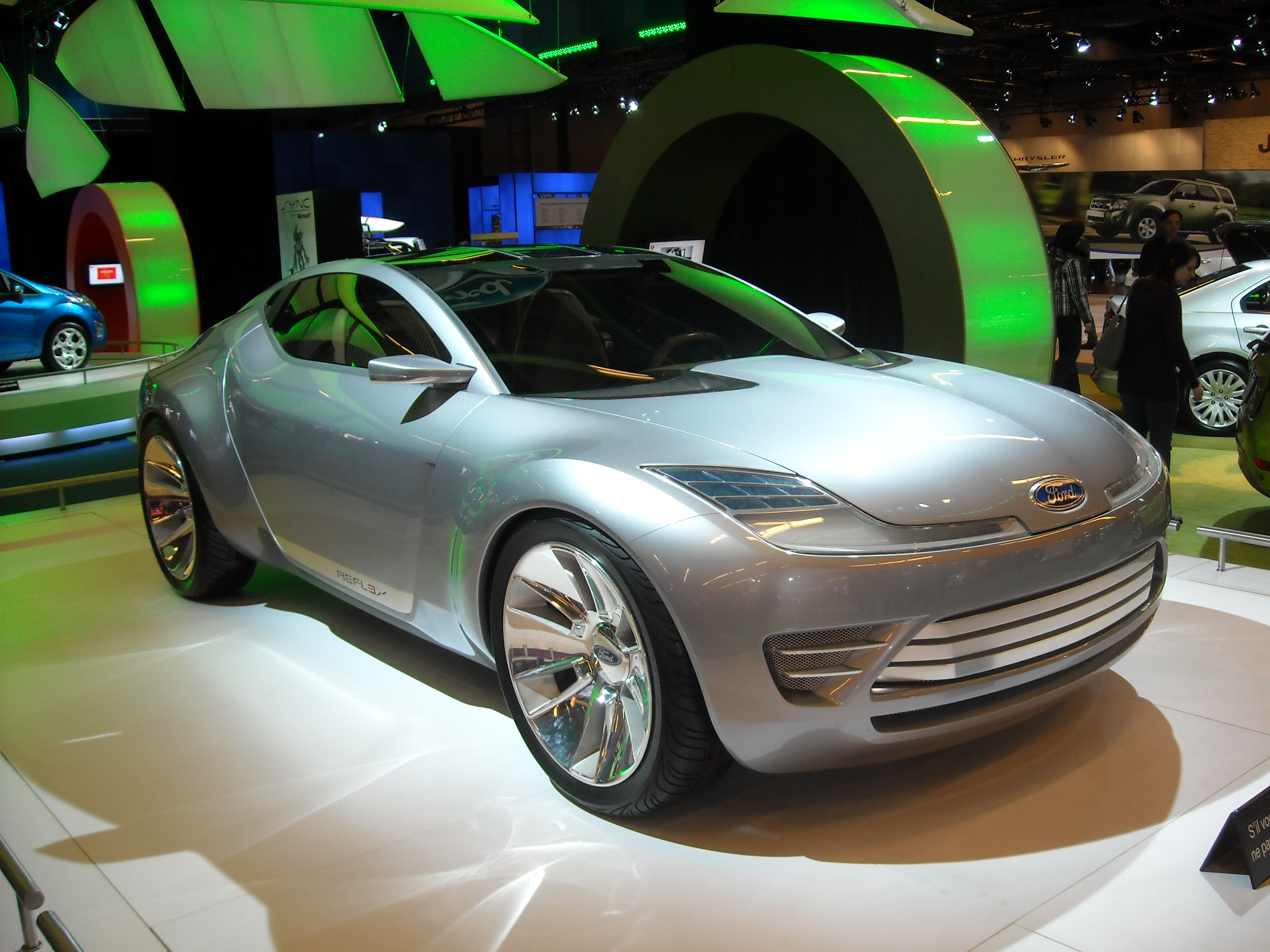

Overview
- Manufacturer: Ford

Body and chassis
- Class: Concept car
- Body style: 2-door coupe

Powertrain
- Engine: Hybrid Electric Diesel 2.0L I4

The Ford Reflex (or REFL3X, as spelled on the vehicle nameplate) was a concept car introduced at the 2006 North American International Auto Show that, according to Ford, "proved small cars could be bold and American". It was a technological showcase that included solar panel-powered headlights, an integrated child seat, a baby cam with a monitor mounted on the dash, inflatable rear safety belts, and an interior quieted by ground rubber taken from Nike athletic shoe outsoles. A production version of the Reflex design has never been announced. It featured an advanced diesel-electric hybrid engine with new-generation lithium ion batteries that could help deliver up to 65 miles per US gallon (3.6 L/100 km; 78 mpg_{‑imp}) of diesel fuel, and could accelerate the vehicle from 0 to 60 mph (97 km/h) in 7 seconds.

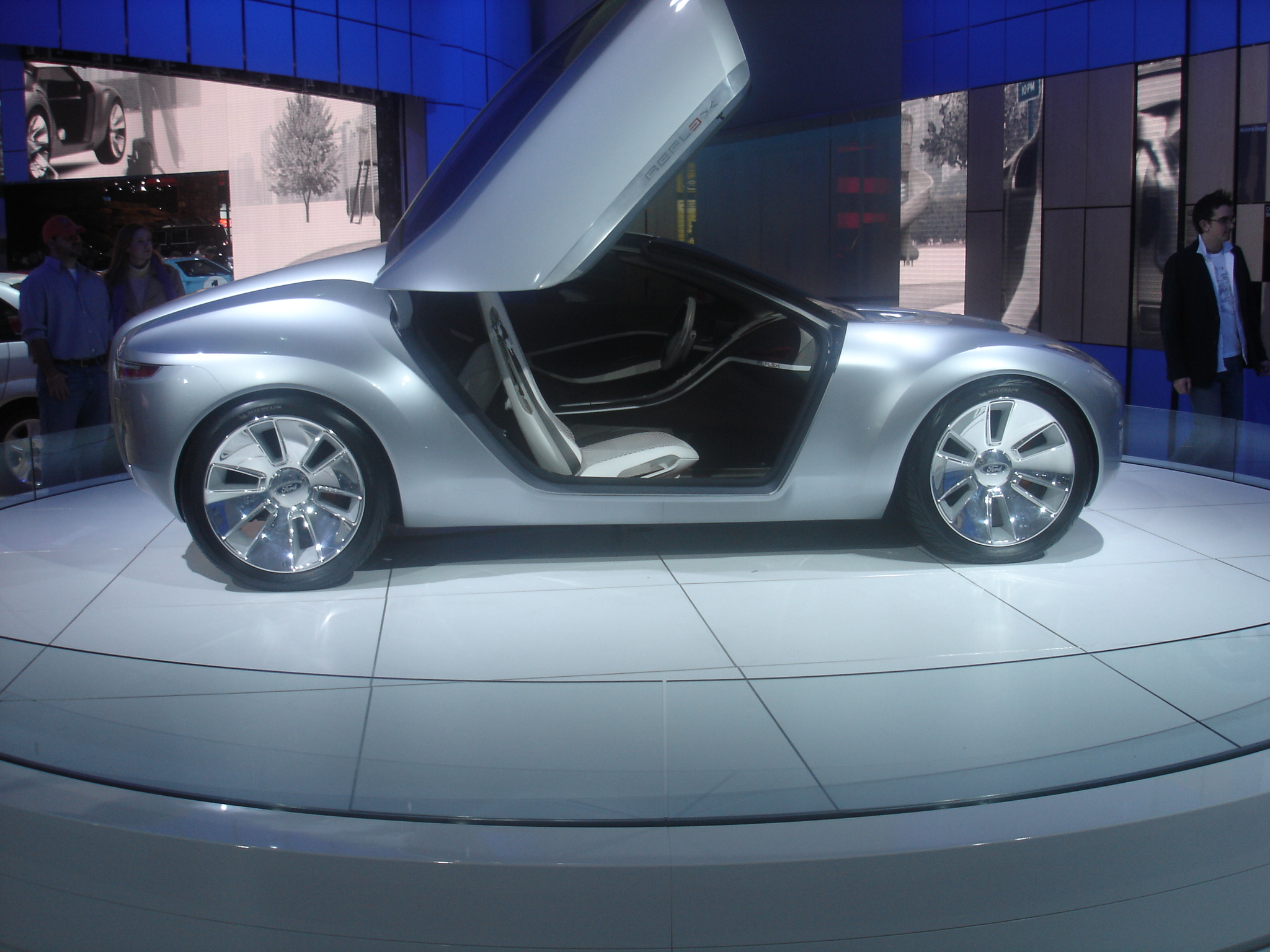
Side view with doors open

The concept featured an electric motor on the rear axle in addition to its hybrid propulsion system on the front axle. The rear motor provided all wheel drive capability, improved driving dynamics, and the fuel economy benefited of a full hybrid vehicle. Reflex's energy was stored in a new-generation lithium-ion battery pack, using the same technology found in cell phones. Ford was the first manufacturer to produce an electric vehicle using this type of battery system when it introduced the electric Ford Ka research vehicle in 2000. Also contributing to Reflex's power and performance were unique headlamps and taillamps that integrated solar panels. The Ford-patented battery-charging lighting system improved fuel economy by using the sun's power to charge the on-board batteries, while capturing and reusing the daylight at night.

The Reflex featured 2+1 seating, with a center-mounted rear "love seat" for 2 children or one adult, that also included a fold-out rear-facing child seat. "Ford Reflex is a small car that doesn't feel small," said Freeman Thomas, director, Ford North American Strategic Design. "It is a gorgeous sporty car that delivers guilt free performance with a hybrid engine. And thanks to its innovative approach to the interior, it has space for growing families."

Reflex was set off with Ford's three-bar grille – made of high-strength anodized extruded aluminum, which was hand polished to a matte finish. The concept's shoulder line flowed upward to the B-pillar and back down into the wheel arch. Reverse butterfly doors aid vehicle ingress and egress.

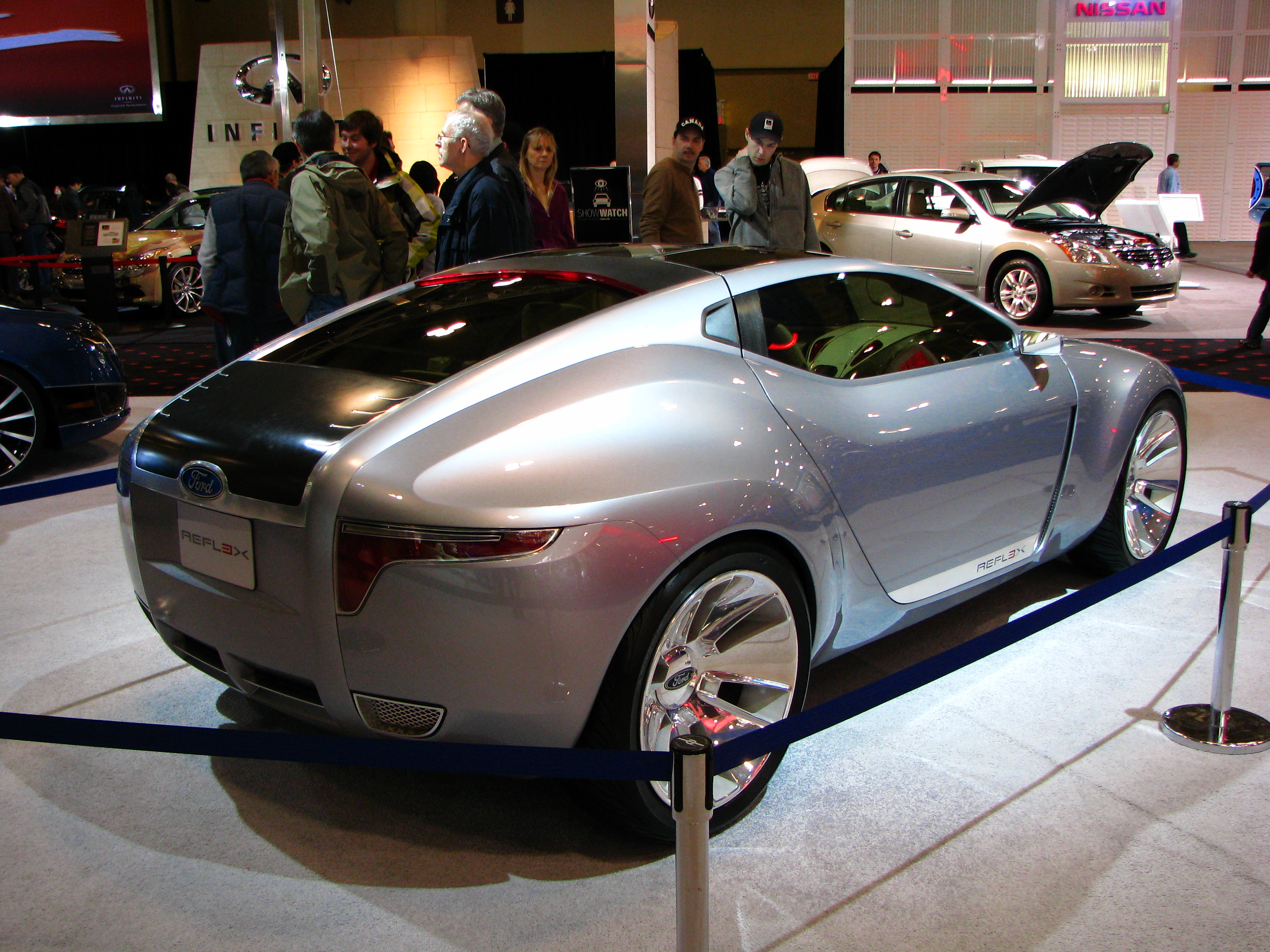
Rear view

The Reflex concept car was similar in size and general configuration as the Mazda Kabura concept, and if they were both ordered into production could share a common platform, with styling and powertrain differences to set the pair apart. For example, while the Kabura concept included a 2.0L 16 valve DOHC piston inline-four engine, a production Kabura could have ended up with a rotary engine, as used in the Mazda RX-8. The Reflex would likely have gotten a more conventional gasoline or diesel (or hybrid) engine.

The car is now on display in the Ford vault in Romulus, Michigan.
