= Diesel–electric powertrain =

Propulsion system for vehicles

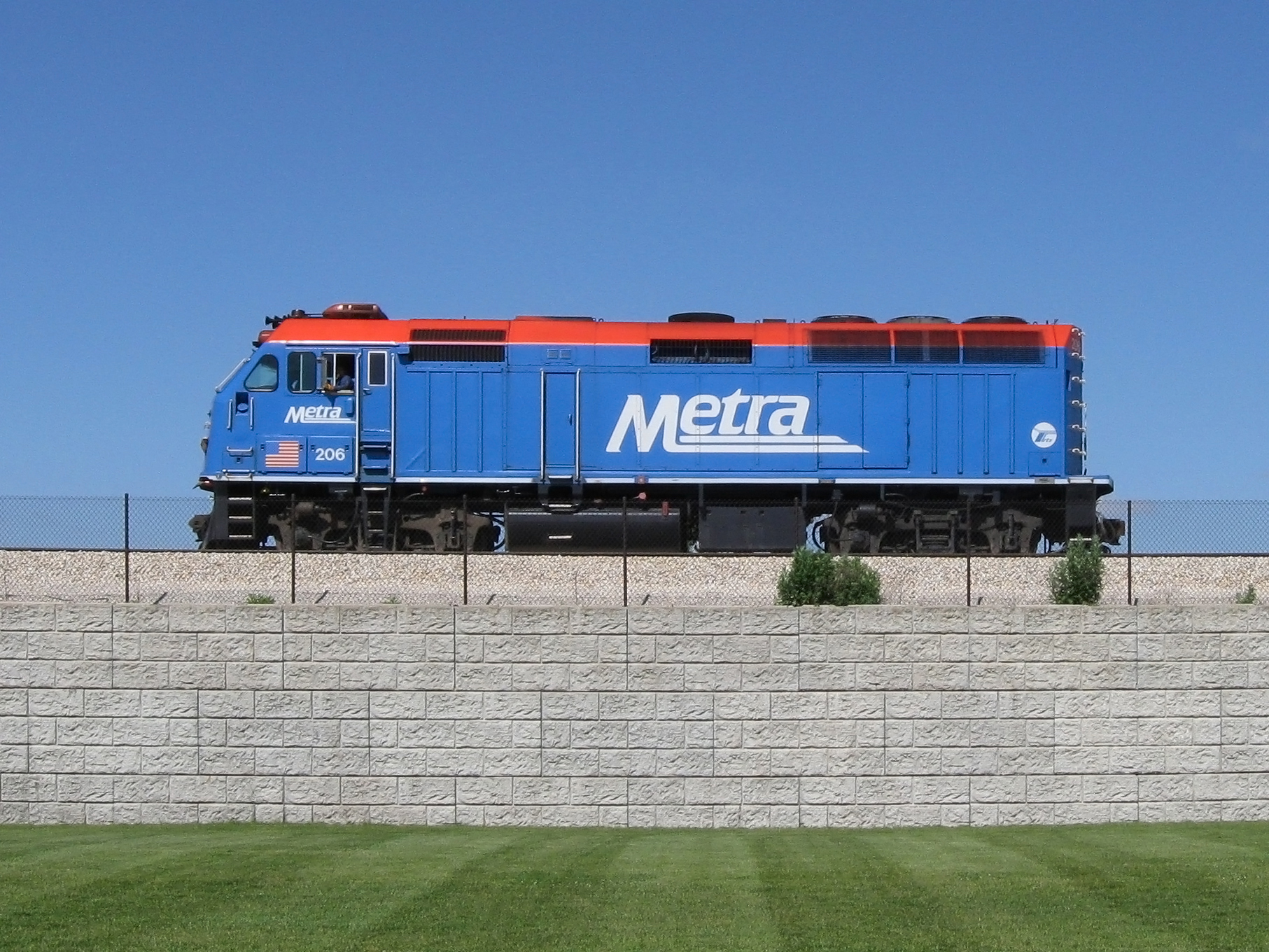
This Metra EMD F40PHM-2 locomotive uses a diesel–electric transmission designed by Electro-Motive Diesel.

A diesel–electric transmission, or diesel–electric powertrain, is a transmission system powered by diesel engines which generate electricity to power electric motors on vehicles in road, rail, and marine transport. Diesel–electric transmission is similar to petrol–electric transmission, which are powered by petrol engines.

Diesel–electric transmission is used on railways by diesel–electric locomotives and diesel–electric multiple units, as electric motors are able to supply full torque from 0 RPM. Diesel–electric systems are also used in marine transport, including submarines, and on some other land vehicles.

== Description ==
A major advantage of diesel–electric transmission is that it avoids the need for a gearbox, by converting the mechanical force of the diesel engine into electrical energy (through an alternator), and using the electrical energy to drive traction motors, which propel the vehicle mechanically. The traction motors may be powered directly or via rechargeable batteries, making the vehicle a type of hybrid electric vehicle. Similar arrangements with other sources of power are petrol–electric transmission (powered by petrol/gasoline engine), and turbine–electric powertrain, used with gas turbines.

== Advantages and disadvantages ==
The gearbox required for a powerful diesel engine directly driving more than one output (e.g., multiple axles) can be very complex and potentially a point of failure; diesel–electric transmission does away with the need for a gearbox. The absence of a gearbox also eliminates the need for gear changes, and avoids uneven acceleration caused by the disengagement of a clutch. With auxiliary batteries the motors can be driven without the engine running constantly, for example in a clean-air zone where use of an internal-combustion engine is restricted.

== Ships ==
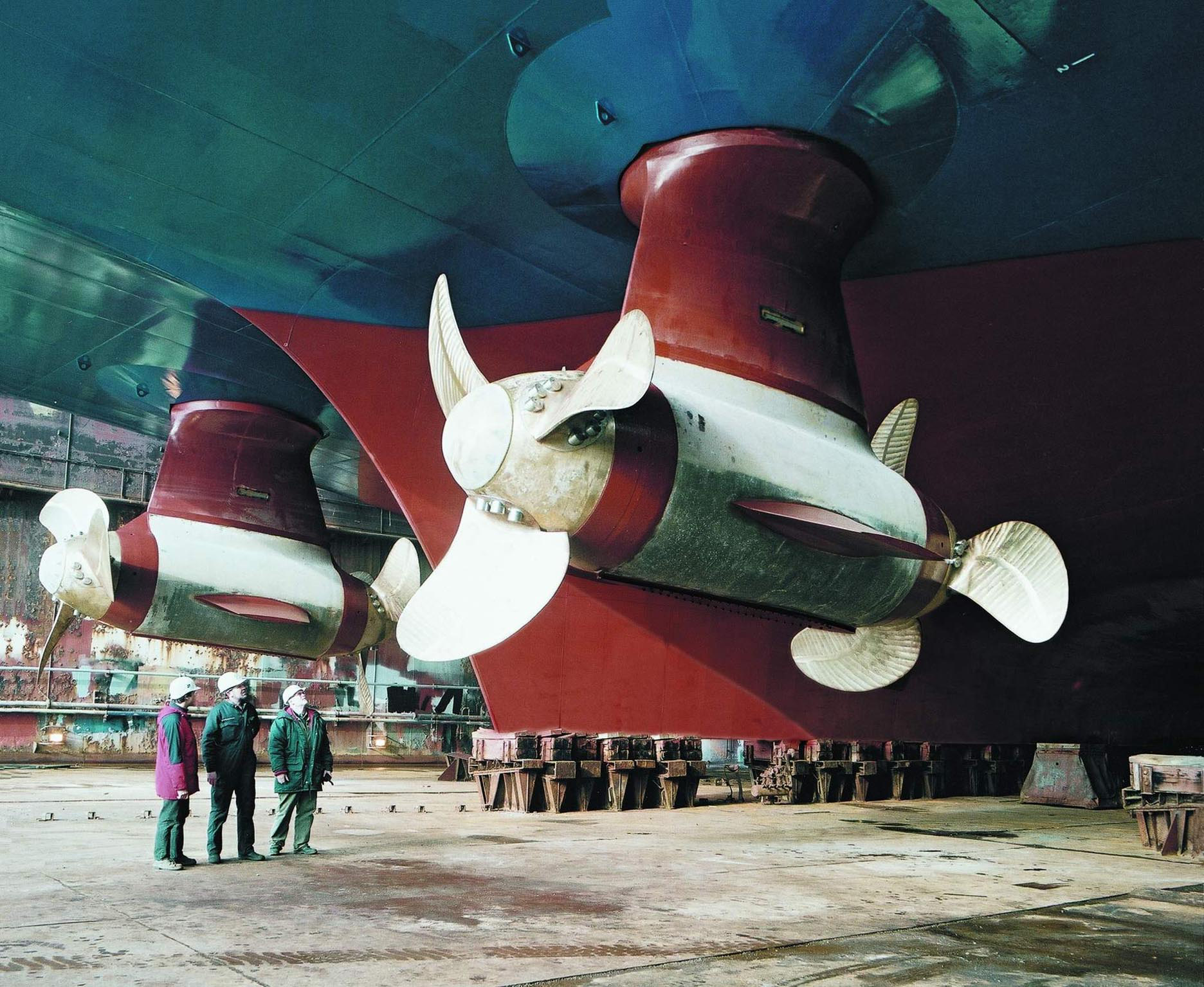
Siemens Schottel azimuth thrusters

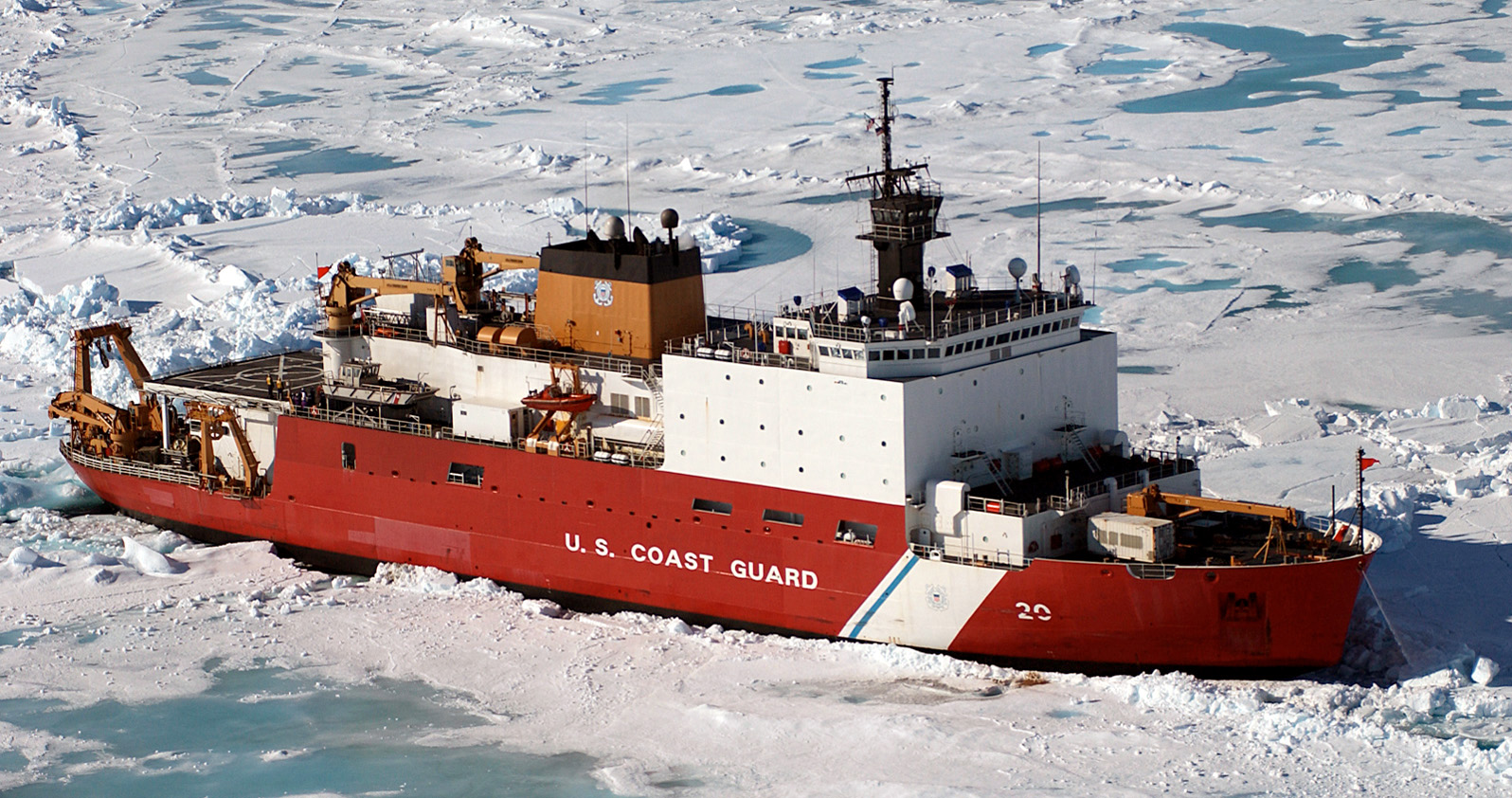
USCGC Healy uses a diesel–electric propulsion system designed by GEC-Alsthom

The first diesel motorship was also the first diesel–electric ship, the Russian tanker Vandal from Branobel, which was launched in 1903. Steam turbine–electric propulsion has been in use since the 1920s (Tennessee-class battleships), using diesel–electric powerplants in surface ships has increased lately. The Finnish coastal defence ships Ilmarinen and Väinämöinen laid down in 1928–1929, were among the first surface ships to use diesel–electric transmission. Later, the technology was used in diesel powered icebreakers.

In World War II, the United States Navy built diesel–electric surface warships. Due to machinery shortages destroyer escorts of the Evarts and Cannon classes were diesel–electric, with half their designed power (The Buckley and Rudderow classes were full-power steam turbine–electric). The Wind-class icebreakers, on the other hand, were designed for diesel–electric propulsion because of its flexibility and resistance to damage.

Some modern diesel–electric ships, including cruise ships and icebreakers, use electric motors in pods called azimuth thrusters underneath to allow for 360° rotation, making the ships far more maneuverable. An example of this is Symphony of the Seas, the largest passenger ship as of 2019.

Gas turbines are also used for electrical power generation and some ships use a combination: Queen Mary 2 has a set of diesel engines in the bottom of the ship plus two gas turbines mounted near the main funnel; all are used for generating electrical power, including those used to drive the propellers. This provides a relatively simple way to use the high-speed, low-torque output of a turbine to drive a low-speed propeller, without the need for excessive reduction gearing.

=== Submarines ===
Most early submarines used a direct mechanical connection between the combustion engine and propeller, switching between diesel engines for surface running and electric motors for submerged propulsion. On the surface, the diesel engine propelled the boat and was also used as a generator to recharge the batteries and supply other electric loads. The engine was disconnected for submerged operation, with batteries powering the electric motor and electrical equipment.

In a true diesel–electric transmission arrangement, by contrast, the propeller or propellers are always driven directly or through reduction gears by one or more electric motors, while one or more diesel generators provide electric energy for charging the batteries and driving the motors. While this solution has some disadvantages compared to using the diesel engine to drive the propeller, the advantages were eventually found to be more important. One of several significant advantages is that it mechanically isolates the noisy engine compartment from the outer pressure hull, protecting the submarine from detection by reducing its acoustic signature when surfaced. Some nuclear submarines also use a similar turbo–electric propulsion system, with propulsion turbo generators driven by reactor plant steam.

Among the pioneering users of true diesel–electric transmission was the Swedish Navy with its first submarine, HMS Hajen (later renamed Ub no 1), launched in 1904 and originally equipped with a semi-diesel engine (a hot-bulb engine primarily meant to be fueled by kerosene), later replaced by a true diesel. From 1909 to 1916, the Swedish Navy launched another seven submarines in three different classes (2nd class, Laxen class, and Braxen class), all using diesel–electric transmission. While Sweden temporarily abandoned diesel–electric transmission as it started to buy submarine designs from abroad in the mid-1910s, the technology was immediately reintroduced when Sweden began to design its own submarines again in the mid-1930s. From that point onwards, diesel–electric transmission has been consistently used for all new classes of Swedish submarines, albeit supplemented by air-independent propulsion (AIP) provided by Stirling engines, beginning with HMS Näcken in 1988.

Another early adopter of diesel–electric transmission was the United States Navy, whose Bureau of Steam Engineering proposed its use in 1928. It was subsequently tried in the S-class submarines S-3, S-6, and S-7, then put into production for the Porpoise class of the 1930s. From that point onwards, it continued to be used on most US conventional submarines.

Apart from the British U-class and some submarines of the Imperial Japanese Navy that used separate diesel generators for low speed running, few navies other than those of Sweden and the US made much use of diesel–electric transmission before 1945. After World War II, by contrast, it gradually became the dominant mode of propulsion for conventional submarines. However, its adoption was not always swift. Notably, the Soviet Navy did not introduce diesel–electric transmission on its conventional submarines until 1980 with its Paltus class.

== Railway locomotives ==
During World War I, there was a strategic need for rail engines without plumes of smoke above them. Diesel technology was not yet sufficiently developed but a few precursor attempts were made, especially for petrol–electric transmissions by the French (Crochat-Collardeau, patent dated 1912 also used for tanks and trucks) and British (Dick, Kerr & Co and British Westinghouse). About 300 of these locomotives, only 96 being standard gauge, were in use at various points in the conflict.

In the 1920s, diesel–electric technology first saw limited use in switcher locomotives (UK: shunter locomotives), locomotives used for moving trains around in railroad yards and assembling and disassembling them. An early company offering "Oil–Electric" locomotives was the American Locomotive Company (ALCO). The ALCO HH series of diesel–electric switcher entered series production in 1931. In the 1930s, the system was adapted for streamliners, the fastest trains of their day. Diesel–electric powerplants became popular because they greatly simplified the way motive power was transmitted to the wheels and because they were both more efficient and had greatly reduced maintenance requirements.

Some diesel locomotives (generally in the low-powered range) and railcars may be fitted with hydraulic, hydrostatic or hydrokinetic transmissions.

Direct-drive transmissions can become very complex. A typical large diesel engine can generate 4,000 horsepower or more, and cannot run at more than about 2,100 rpm; it would need 20 or 30 gears to travel at speeds from slow up to even 180 kilometres per hour (110 mph). A gearbox to handle these gears at that power, and furthermore to drive four or more axles, would be huge, complicated, inefficient, and subject to mechanical failure. Coupling the diesel to a generator eliminates this problem. An alternative is to use a torque converter or fluid coupling to replace the gearbox in a direct drive system.

== Road and other land vehicles ==
=== Buses ===
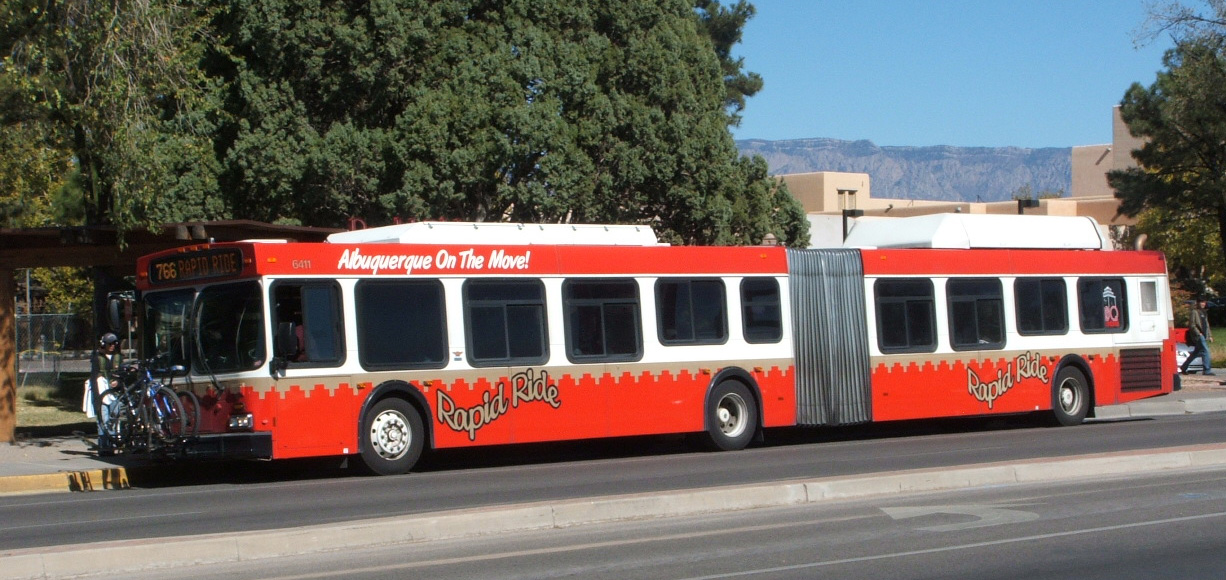
New Flyer Industries DE60LF diesel–electric bus with rooftop batteries

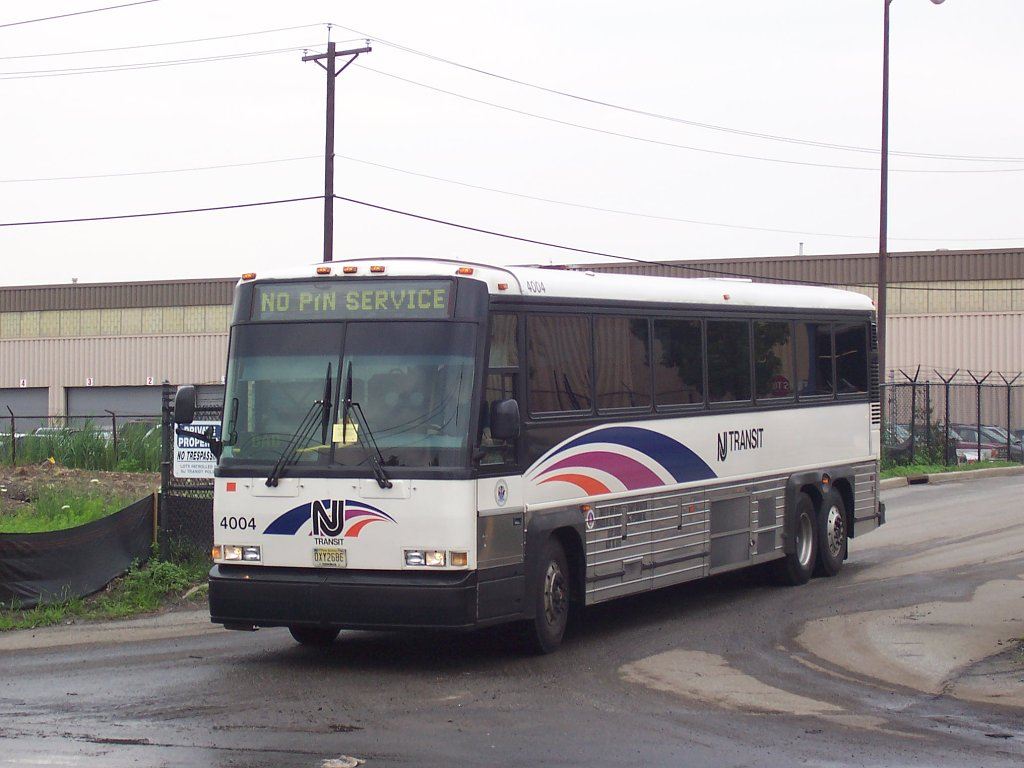
MCI diesel electric prototype bus with batteries under the floor

Diesel–electric powered buses have also been produced, including hybrid systems able to run on and store electrical power in batteries. The two main providers of hybrid systems for diesel–electric transit buses include Allison Transmission and BAE Systems. New Flyer Industries, Gillig Corporation, and North American Bus Industries are major customers for the Allison EP hybrid systems, while Orion Bus Industries and Nova Bus are major customer for the BAE HybriDrive system. Mercedes-Benz makes their own diesel–electric drive system, which is used in their Citaro. The only bus that runs on single diesel–electric transmission is the Mercedes Benz Cito low floor concept bus which was introduced in 1998.

=== Trucks ===
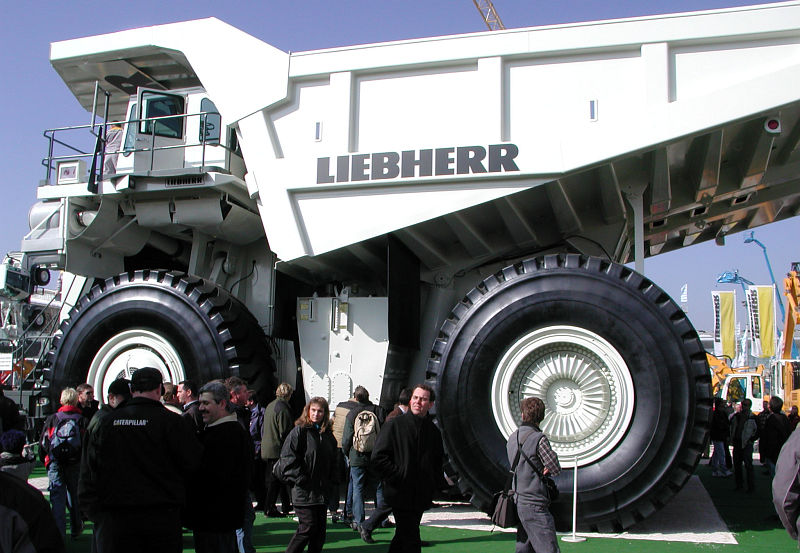
The diesel–electric powered Liebherr T282 dumper

Examples include:

- Large mining machines, such as the Liebherr T 282B dump truck or LeTourneau L-2350 wheel loader.
- NASA's Crawler-Transporters.
- Mitsubishi Fuso Canter Eco Hybrid commercial truck.
- International DuraStar Hybrid diesel–electric truck.
- Dodge is conducting fleet tests of a diesel–electric version of the Dodge Sprinter.
- Peterbilt Supertruck 1 and 2.
- Hyllion Inc. is modifying some semi trucks to run on its 6X4HE Class 8 diesel electric hybrid system.
- Edison Motors is a Canadian company making electric and diesel electric semi trucks and pickup trucks.

=== Concept vehicles ===
In the automobile industry, diesel engines in combination with electric transmissions and battery power are being developed for future vehicle drive systems. Partnership for a New Generation of Vehicles was a cooperative research program between the U.S. government and "The Big Three" automobile manufacturers (DaimlerChrysler, Ford and General Motors) that developed diesel hybrid cars.

- "Third-Millennium Cruiser", an attempt to commercialize a diesel–electric automobile in the early 1980s.
- General Motors Precept
- Ford Prodigy
- Dodge Intrepid ESX
- Ford Reflex is a diesel hybrid concept car.
- Zytek developed a diesel hybrid powertrain.
- Peugeot 307 Hybrid HDi
- Citroën C-Cactus
- Opel Flextreme
- Top Gear Hammerhead Eagle i-Thrust
- Rivian Automotive was developing a diesel–electric engine that should achieve an estimated 90 miles per U.S. gallon (2.61 L/100 km) in the city and over 100 miles per U.S. gallon (2.35 L/100 km) on the highway.

=== Military vehicles ===
Diesel–electric propulsion has been tried on some military vehicles, such as tanks. The German armored vehicles VK 45.01 (P), Elefant, and Panzer VIII Maus of the Second World War were petrol–electric or diesel–electric propelled. The prototype TOG1 and TOG2 super heavy tanks of the Second World War used twin generators driven by V12 diesel engines. More recent prototypes include the SEP modular armoured vehicle and T95e. Future tanks may use diesel–electric drives to improve fuel efficiency while reducing the size, weight and noise of the power plant. Attempts with diesel–electric drives on wheeled military vehicles include the unsuccessful ACEC Cobra, MGV, and XM1219 armed robotic vehicle.

== See also ==
- DC distribution system (ship propulsion)
- Petrol–electric transmission
- Turbine–electric powertrain (aka turbo–electric)
