= American Battery Technology Company =

Battery recycling company

- American Battery Technology Company
- Traded as: Nasdaq: ABAT
- Industry: Renewable energy Lithium-ion battery
- Founded: 2011; 15 years ago
- Headquarters: United States
- Area served: United States
- Website: americanbatterytechnology.com

American Battery Technology Company, formerly American Battery Metals Corporation, is a US-based battery recycling technology startup founded in 2011. It employs a hydrometallurgical process to recycle batteries and a targeted extraction system to extract raw materials from primary resources.

In 2019, the company was selected as winner of BASF’s Battery Recycling Circularity Challenge, allowing for the demonstration of its lithium-ion battery recycling technology as part of the Greentown Labs accelerator program. In 2021, it received a $2 million contract from the United States Advanced Battery Consortium, in collaboration with the U.S. Department of Energy for commercialization of its integrated lithium-ion battery recycling system.

In October 2022, it was selected for a $57 million grant by the Department of Energy to design, construct, commission, and operate a first-of-its-kind commercial-scale facility to demonstrate its process for the manufacturing of battery cathode-grade lithium hydroxide from unconventional Nevada-based lithium-bearing sedimentary resources.

The company's Research Development Center has been located at the Nevada Center for Applied Research at the University of Nevada Reno since 2021.

In late 2025, the company began the cleanup of the remains of the large fire in the 300 MW section of the Moss Landing battery.

== Stock market trading ==
On September 21, 2023, American Battery Technology Company listed on the Nasdaq stock exchange under the ticker $ABAT. Previous to this, it was traded over the counter under the ticker $ABML.

ABML rose to popular awareness as a penny stock in early 2021 alongside other meme stocks such as AMC and Gamestop. Various forums on Reddit, including WallStreetBets, have mentioned and promoted American Battery Technology Company.
