= Dodge Intrepid ESX =

Motor vehicle

The Dodge Intrepid ESX prototype cars are the result of the 1993 response by the Chrysler Corporation to a challenge by U.S. President Bill Clinton to produce a vehicle which was capable of meeting the demands of the modern consumer, while still achieving an unprecedented 80 miles per US gallon (2.9 L/100 km; 96.1 mpg_{‑imp}) overall in fuel economy. The PNGV - Partnership for a New Generation of Vehicles project was aimed at The Big Three American car manufacturers.

== ESX I (1996) ==
The first attempt made by Chrysler at exceeding 80 mpg was designated the Intrepid ESX. The ESX I, although a series hybrid, used what might be considered "conventional technology". Chrysler invested an estimated US$3 million into the project, which used exotic materials in its construction. The ESX was designed by Bob Boniface, who went on the design the 1998 production Dodge Intrepid.

The engine was derived from a series hybrid-drive propulsion system meant to use 40% of gasoline's potential energy while at optimum RPM (the typical car only uses 15% of gasoline's potential energy due to wide ranges of RPMs). The car was powered by a VM Motori 1.8 L three-cylinder turbocharged diesel, whose energy was diverted to a 180 lb (82 kg), 300 V TMF battery developed by Bolder Technologies in Golden, Colorado and two oil-cooled electric wheel motors. The electric motors were also part of the regenerative braking system, where energy normally lost through the disc brakes recharged the batteries.

== ESX II (1998) ==
The second series in the ESX line completed testing in 1998, and made several improvements on its predecessor.

The ESX II was dubbed a "mybrid" (mild hybrid) because its reliance on electrical power was not highly dependent on the battery. This system contained two motors that worked in parallel: a 1.5 L 74 bhp direct-injection diesel and a 20 bhp AC-induction electric motor. Coupled with the powertrains were a 5-speed electronically shifted manual transmission, a nickel-metal hydride battery pack, and controlling equipment which included components from the Patriot hybrid race-car program. The main power came from the diesel engine. The electric motor charged the batteries, added to the acceleration, and powered the reverse gear.

To cut down on cost and weight, Chrysler fit the car with an unpainted thermoplastic body attached to an aluminum frame. The shape had low aerodynamic drag. Inside, trim was constructed of carbon fiber and the seats were constructed from tube frame. The final cost: only $15,000 more than a regular Intrepid, or about $37,000.

== ESX III (2003) ==
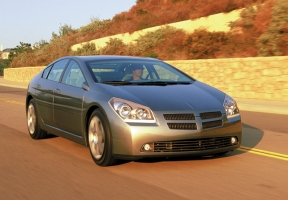
The 72 mpg diesel-hybrid ESX III

The ESX III progress in fuel efficiency and costs stem from several major improvements in technology: The ESX3's mild hybrid electric (or "mybrid") powertrain combines an efficient diesel engine, an electric motor and a lithium-ion battery to achieve an average 72 miles per gallon (3.3 liters/100 km) fuel efficiency (gasoline equivalent). That is two miles per gallon better than the fuel efficiency of its predecessor, the ESX2 in 1998, and close to PNGV's goal of 80 miles per US gallon (2.9 L/100 km; 96.1 mpg_{‑imp}).

An electro-mechanical automatic transmission (EMAT) developed by DaimlerChrysler engineers provides the fuel efficiency of a manual transmission with the convenience of an automatic.

The lightweight body uses injection-molded thermoplastics to achieve significant improvements in weight and cost. The ESX3 weighs in at just 2,250 pounds (1020 kg) while meeting all federal safety standards and providing the roominess and comfort of today's family sedan. The entire vehicle is more than 80 percent recyclable.

A total rethinking of the car's electronic and electrical systems cut several pounds from the weight of electronics while providing driver controls, vehicle monitoring and diagnostic indicators, audio and video systems, and a telemetrics package.

There are no plans to produce any of the ESX series of vehicles; the Intrepid nameplate has been retired, and Dodge has no immediate plans to produce a hybrid sedan.
