= Sarasota Classic Car Museum =

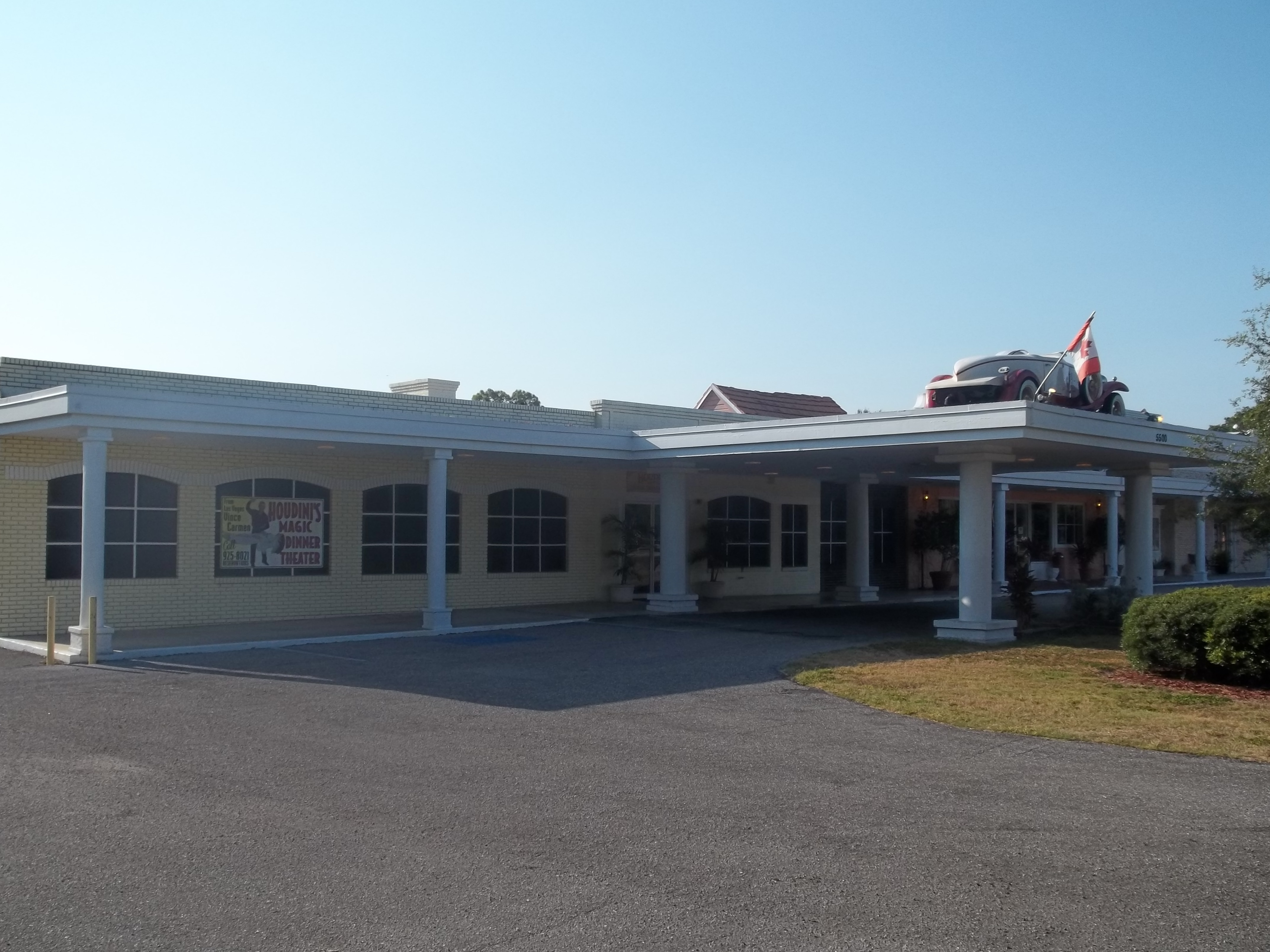
- Front of Sarasota Classic Car Museum

- Location within Florida
- Established: March 1953
- Dissolved: 2023
- Location: Sarasota, Florida
- Coordinates: 27°22′56″N 82°33′21″W
- Type: Automobile museum
- Public transit access: Sarasota County Area Transit
- Website: sarasotacarmuseum.org

The Sarasota Classic Car Museum was located at 5500 North Tamiami Trail, Sarasota, Florida, United States. It housed about 150 vintage cars of all types and motorcycles in a 60,000-square-foot (5,600 m^{2}) facility with constantly rotating collection.

Opened by Herbert and Bob Horn in 1953 as Horns' Cars of Yesterday, it was promoted as the "second oldest continuously operating antique car museum" in the United States. The museum displayed rare cars and ones owned by famous people. It also had an Italian Car Collection which included cars from Alfa Romeo, Ferrari, and Rivolta.

It closed in June 2023 after the land owner, New College of Florida, terminated its lease. The site was turned into the Beruff Family Field of Dreams baseball stadium.
