= Partnership for a New Generation of Vehicles =

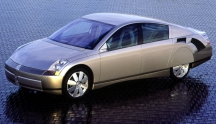
The 80 mpg diesel-hybrid General Motors Precept

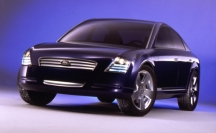
The 72 mpg diesel-hybrid Ford Prodigy

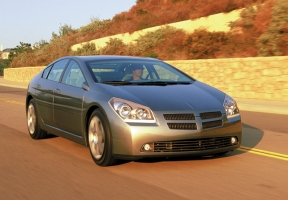
The 72 mpg diesel-hybrid Chrysler ESX-3

The Partnership for a New Generation of Vehicles was a co-operative research program between the US government and the three major domestic auto corporations that was aimed at bringing extremely fuel-efficient (up to 80 mpg_{‑US} (2.9 L/100 km; 96 mpg_{‑imp}) vehicles to market by 2003.

The partnership, formed in 1993, involved eight federal agencies, the national laboratories, universities, and the United States Council for Automotive Research (USCAR), which comprises DaimlerChrysler, Ford Motor Company, and General Motors Corporation.

"Supercar" was the unofficial description for the research-and-development program.

On track to achieving its objectives, the program was canceled by the George W. Bush administration in 2001 at the request of the automakers, with some of its aspects shifted to the much more distant FreedomCAR program.

== Objectives ==
The main purposes of the program were to develop technologies to reduce the impact of cars and light trucks on the environment and to decrease the US dependency on imported petroleum. The program was to make working vehicles achieving up to triple the contemporaryng fuel efficiency as and further minimizing emissions but without sacrificing affordability, performance, or safety. The common term for the vehicles was "supercar" because of the technological advances. The goal of achieving the 80 mpg_{‑US} (2.9 L/100 km; 96 mpg_{‑imp}) target with a family-sized sedan included using new fuel sources, powerplants, aerodynamics, and lightweight materials.

The program was established in 1993 to support the domestic US automakers (GM, Ford, and Chrysler) to develop prototype automobiles which would be safe, clean, and affordable; the target was a car the size of the Ford Taurus with triple its fuel efficiency.

== Results ==
The program "overcame many challenges and has forged a useful and productive partnership of industry and government participants" by "resulting in three concept cars that demonstrate the feasibility of a variety of new automotive technologies" with diesel-electric transmission.

The three domestic automakers (GM, Ford, and Chrysler) developed fully-operational concept cars. They were full-sized five-passenger family cars and achieved at least 72 mpg_{‑US} (3.3 L/100 km; 86 mpg_{‑imp}).

General Motors developed the 80 mpg Precept, Ford designed the 72 mpg Prodigy, and Chrysler built the 72 mpg ESX-3. They featured aerodynamic lightweight aluminum or thermoplastic construction and used a hybrid vehicle drivetrain, pairing 3- or 4-cylinder diesel engines with electric motors drawing from NiMH or lithium ion batteries.

Researchers for the PNGV identified a number of ways to reach 80 mpg, including reducing vehicle weight, increasing engine efficiency, combining gasoline engines and electric motors in hybrid vehicles, implementing regenerative braking, and switching to high-efficiency fuel cell powerplants. Specific new technology breakthroughs achieved under the program included the following:

- Development of carbon foam with extremely high heat conductivity (2000 R&D 100 Award)
- Near frictionless carbon coating, many times slicker than Teflon (1998 R&D 100 Award)
- Oxygen-rich air supplier for clean diesel technology (1999 R&D 100 Award)
- Development of a compact microchannel fuel vaporizer to convert gasoline to hydrogen for fuel cells (1999 R&D 100 Award)
- Development of aftertreatment devices to remove nitrogen oxides from diesel exhaust with efficiencies greater than 90 percent when used with diesel fuel containing 3 ppm of sulfur
- Improvement of the overall efficiency and power-to-weight ratios of power electronics to within 25 percent of targets while reducing the cost by 86 percent to $10/kW since 1995
- Reduction in cost of lightweight aluminum, magnesium, and glass-fiber-reinforced polymer components to less than 50% of the cost of steel
- Reduction in the cost of fuel cells from $10,000/kW in 1994 to $300/kW in 2000
- Substantial weight reduction to within 5-10% of the vehicle weight reduction goal

== Criticisms ==
Ralph Nader called the program "an effort to coordinate the transfer of property rights for federally funded research and development to the automotive industry."

The program was also criticized by some groups for a focus on diesel solutions; the fuel is seen by some as having inherently high air pollutant emissions.

Elizabeth Kolbert, a staff writer at The New Yorker, described that renewable energy is the main problem: "If someone, somewhere, comes up with a source of power that is safe, inexpensive, and for all intents and purposes inexhaustible, then we, the Chinese, the Indians, and everyone else on the planet can keep on truckin'. Barring that, the car of the future may turn out to be no car at all."
