= United States Council for Automotive Research =

US automakers' research consortium.

United States Council for Automotive Research LLC (USCAR) is an umbrella organization for collaborative research that comprises Ford Motor Company, General Motors and Stellantis. Its goal is to further strengthen the technology base of the U.S. auto industry through cooperative research and development. It has Electrical Wiring Component Applications Partnership, United States Automotive Materials Partnership, and United States Advanced Battery Consortium (USABC) as part of its consortia. USABC pursues research and development of advanced energy systems for electric and hybrid electric vehicles to achieve significantly increased range and performance.

In November 2021, the US Advanced Battery Consortium in collaboration with the US Department of Energy awarded a $2 million grant to American Battery Technology Company, BASF, and Magnis Energy Technologies's C4V.

USCAR participates in the U.S. DRIVE Partnership with the U.S. Department of Energy, five energy companies, and two major utilities. Its mission is to develop and advance a sustainable transportation future. This includes the high-risk research needed to: enable a full range of affordable cars, light trucks and the fueling infrastructure to support them; reduce the dependence of the nation's personal transportation system on imported oil; minimize harmful vehicle emissions, without sacrificing freedom of mobility and freedom of vehicle choice; and enable a long-term transition to a hydrogen economy.

== See also ==
- FreedomCAR
- List of electric vehicle battery manufacturers
- Partnership for a New Generation of Vehicles
