= Chrysler 300 =

Full-size car

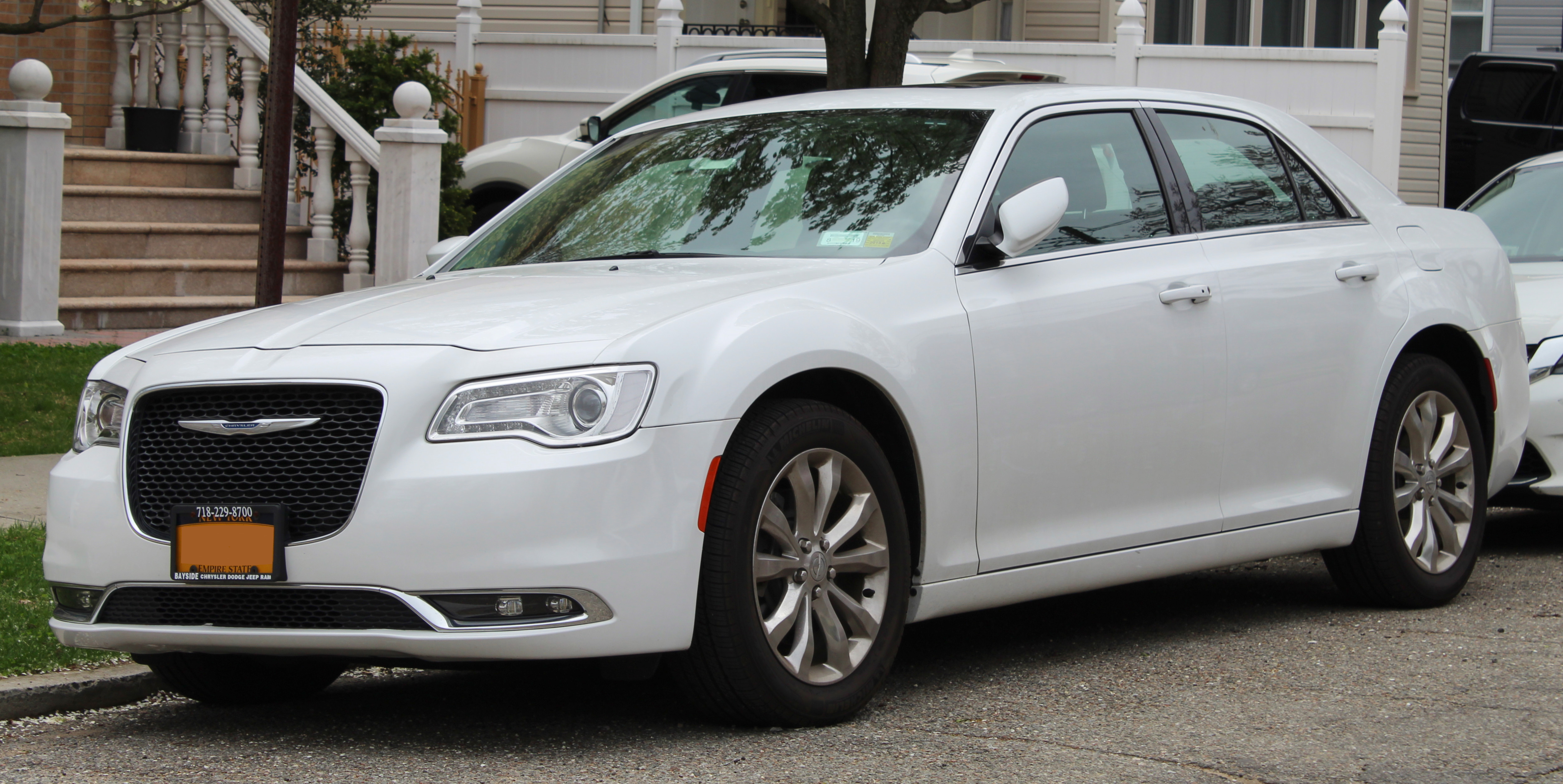

Overview
- Manufacturer: Chrysler (Note: DaimlerChrysler (2004–2007); Chrysler LLC (2007–2009); Chrysler Group LLC (2009–2014); FCA US LLC (2014–2021); Stellantis North America (2021–2023))
- Also called: Lancia Thema (Europe; 2011–2014)
- Production: February 1, 2004– December 2023
- Model years: 2005–2023

Body and chassis
- Class: Full-size car (E)
- Layout: Front engine, rear-wheel drive / all-wheel drive

Chronology
- Predecessor: For Chrysler 300: Chrysler 300 letter series Chrysler 300 non-letter series Chrysler 300M; Chrysler Concorde; Chrysler Intrepid (Canada); For Lancia Thema: Lancia Thesis (Europe)

The Chrysler 300 is a full-size car produced by Chrysler under Stellantis North America and its predecessors. The first generation (model years 2005–2010) was available as a four-door sedan and station wagon, and the second generation (model years 2011–2023) was available solely as a sedan.

The second-generation 300 was marketed as the Chrysler 300C in the United Kingdom and Ireland and as the Lancia Thema in the remainder of Europe.

== Background ==
The Chrysler 300 continues a tradition of full-sized, front-engine, rear-wheel drive, V8-powered luxury sedans the company has offered, starting in the 1940s with the Chrysler Saratoga and Chrysler New Yorker, followed by the Chrysler Windsor, Chrysler Newport, and the Chrysler Cordoba, with the last rear wheel drive sedan, the Chrysler Fifth Avenue that ended production in 1989.

When the company began operations in 1925, the Chrysler Six was entered as a roadster in the 1925 24 Hours of Le Mans where it finished the race. In 1926, the Chrysler Imperial started the luxury and performance products tradition. Starting in 1955, the Imperial became a separate luxury brand and offered the Imperial Newport along with the Imperial Crown. The original Chrysler FirePower Hemi engine powered the Cunningham C-5R, a special racecar, and finished the 1952 Le Mans, 1953 Le Mans, and 1954 Le Mans endurance races, as well as the 1953 12 Hours of Sebring.

== First generation (2005) ==
First generation
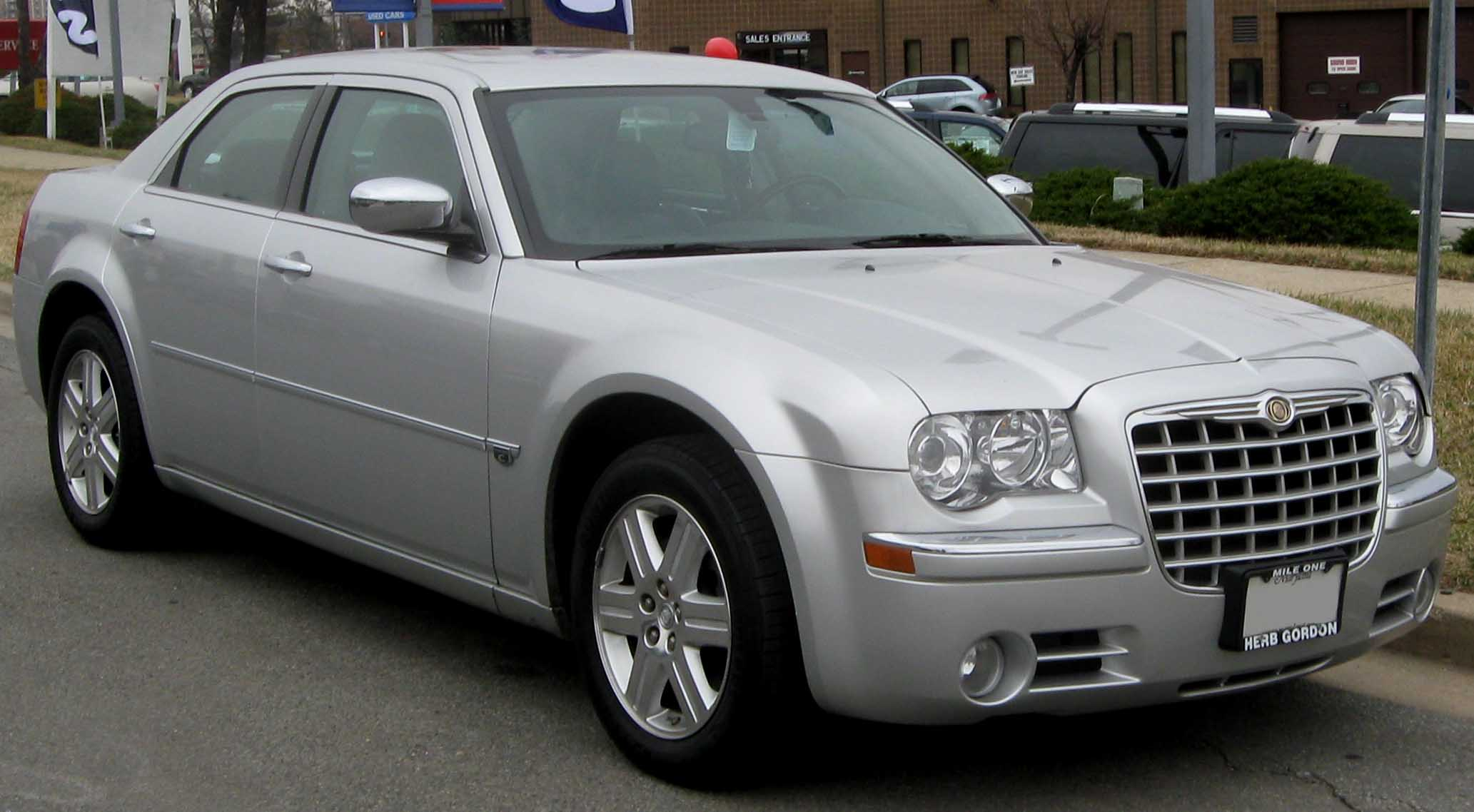
- Chrysler 300C

Overview
- Also called: Chrysler 300C
- Production: January 28, 2004–2010
- Model years: 2005–2010
- Assembly: Canada: Brampton, Ontario (Brampton Assembly); Austria: Graz (Magna Steyr: 2005–2010); China: Beijing (Beijing Benz: 2006–2009)
- Designer: Ralph Gilles (2000); Freeman Thomas (2000); Tom Gale (2000)

Body and chassis
- Body style: 4-door notchback sedan 5-door station wagon (not in North America)
- Platform: Chrysler LX platform
- Related: Dodge Charger; Dodge Challenger; Dodge Magnum; Mercedes-Benz E-Class (W211)

Powertrain
- Engine: 2.7 L EER V6; 3.5 L EGG V6; 5.7 L EZB Hemi V8; 6.1 L ESF Hemi V8; 3.0 L Mercedes-Benz OM642 CRD turbo-diesel V6
- Transmission: 4-speed Ultradrive 42RLE automatic 5-speed Mercedes-Benz W5A580 automatic

Dimensions
- Wheelbase: 120.0 in (3,048 mm); 126.0 in (3,200 mm) (Executive Series)
- Length: 197.8 in (5,024 mm)
- Width: 74.1 in (1,882 mm)
- Height: 58.4 in (1,483 mm); SRT8: 57.9 in (1,471 mm)
- Curb weight: 3,721–4,046 lb (1,688–1,835 kg)

The 300 debuted as a concept at the 2003 New York International Auto Show with styling by Ralph Gilles, and production started in January 2004 for the 2005 model year. The 300 was designed as a modern interpretation of the 1955 Chrysler C-300 (and the letter series Chryslers that followed), featuring a large grille, long hood and low roofline that was prominent on those vehicles. The styling retained many elements of the 1998 Chrysler Chronos concept car, such as chrome interior accents and tortoiseshell finishing on the steering wheel and shifter knob. It was the last Chrysler vehicle designed under Tom Gale upon his retirement from DaimlerChrysler in December 2000. It shares a nameplate with the 1957 300C letter series two-door hardtop and convertible.

The 300 is based on the rear-wheel drive Chrysler LX platform with Chrysler executives confirming that Chrysler engineers were sent to Germany to study the upcoming W211 Mercedes-Benz E-Class, and as such, structural elements of the car's foundation such as the toe board, safety cage architecture, as well as the load-path philosophy ending up being derived from the design(s) utilized by then-partner, Mercedes-Benz. Shared and or derived components from Mercedes-Benz included: the 3.0L OM642 turbo-diesel V6 used in overseas markets, the rear suspension cradle and 5-link independent rear suspension design derived from the W211 E-Class, a double-wishbone front suspension design with short-and-long arm front suspension geometry derived from the W220 S-Class. The five-speed NAG1 W5A580 transmission, rear differential, driveshaft, ESP & ABS systems, steering system, the CAN Bus electrical architecture, and cabin electronics, including other electronic and engine modules, were derived from Mercedes-Benz components. Further, switchgear such as the cruise control and turn signal combination stalk, seat controls, seat frames, HVAC system(s), and the wiring harness were utilized from Mercedes-Benz components. Later model years also feature a Mercedes-Benz-derived laser key ignition system instead of the traditional metal key. The AWD models also benefited from using Mercedes-Benz's 4MATIC system, including transfer case components.

=== Model range ===
==== Base ====
The basic 300 includes 17-inch wheels, wheel covers, four-wheel disc brakes, a single disc CD player, an auxiliary input jack, a power driver seat, and a four-speed (42RLE) automatic transmission. It uses a 2,736 cc (2.736 L; 167.0 cu in) EER V6 rated at 190 hp (142 kW). In Canada, it came standard with the Touring model's 3,518 cc (3.5 L; 214.7 cu in) V6 engine. The vehicle comes with standard rear-wheel drive and available all-wheel drive. The basic 300 model was renamed to LX for 2008 and remains the code name for the platform.

==== Touring ====
The Touring model uses a 3,518 cc (3.5 L; 214.7 cu in) V6, producing 250 hp (186 kW) and 250 lb⋅ft (339 N⋅m) of torque, either a four- or five-speed transmission depending on the year and drive configuration, and comes with 17-inch aluminum wheels, AM/FM radio with CD player and auxiliary audio jack, Electronic Stability Program (ESP), remote keyless entry, leather-trimmed seats, and Sirius Satellite Radio. This model was renamed Touring Plus for the 2009 and 2010 model years.

==== Limited ====
The Limited model included the Touring model's 3.5 L V6 engine, generating 250 hp (186 kW) and 250 lb⋅ft (339 N⋅m) and either a four- or five-speed transmission depending on the year and drive configuration. Additional features included 17 or 18-inch chrome-clad aluminum road wheels (depending on year), and anti-roll bars, chrome-ringed gauges from the 300C, Chrysler's EVIC system that was standard on V8 models, dual-zone automatic climate control, available navigation, automatic headlights, hands-free calling, Boston Acoustics audio system, parking sensors, and in later years, the same fascia as that of the 300C.

==== 300C ====
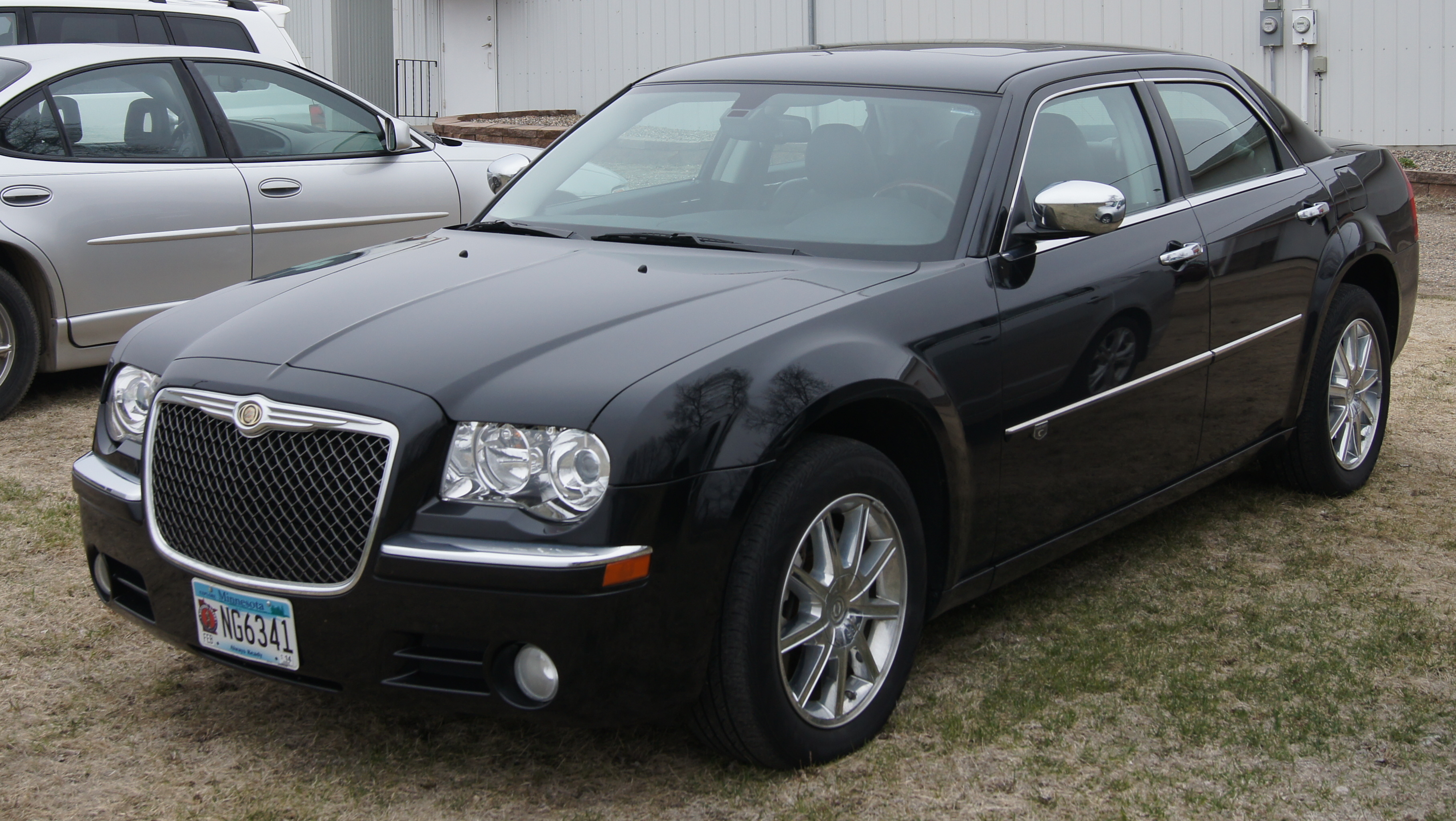
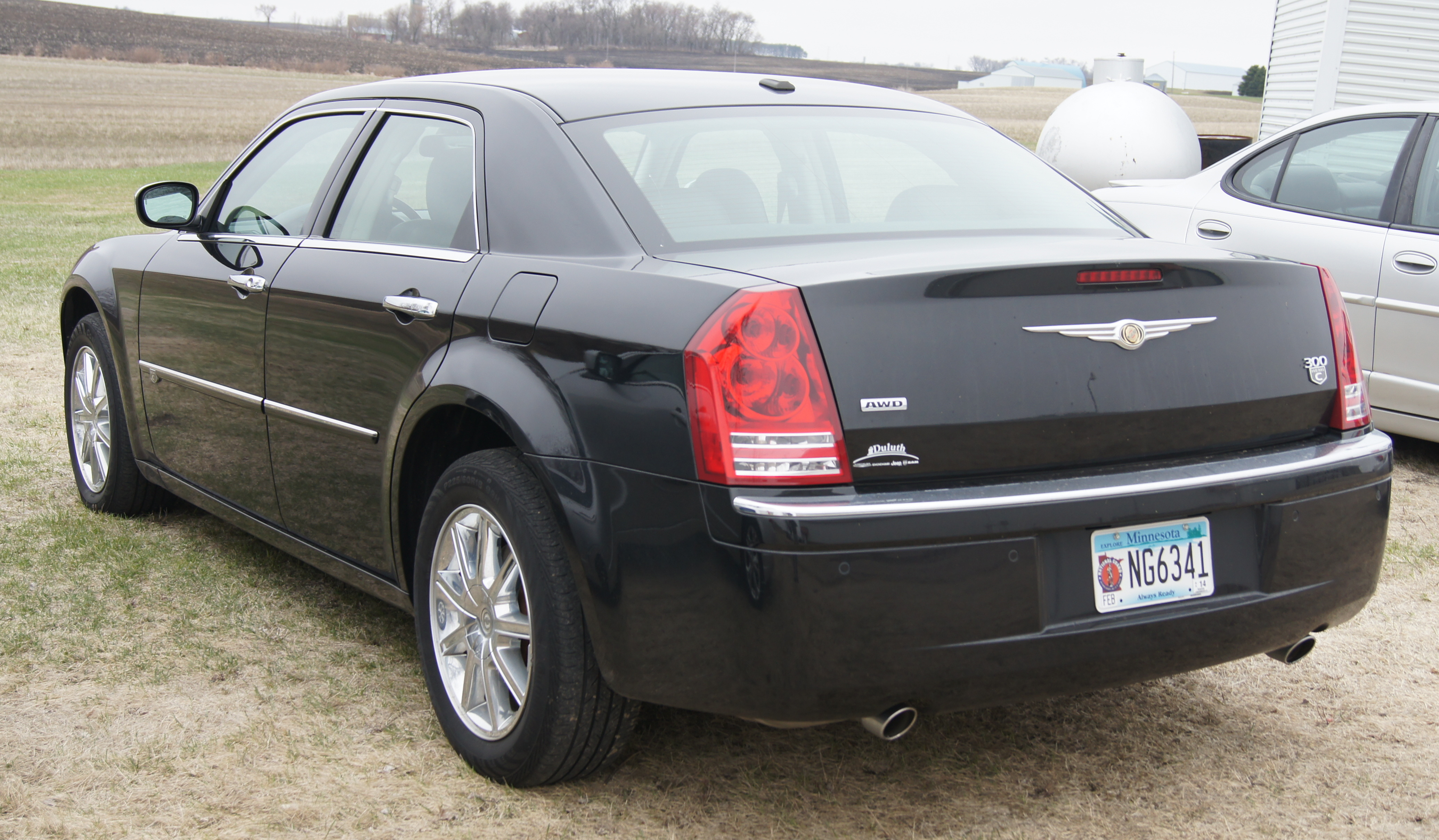

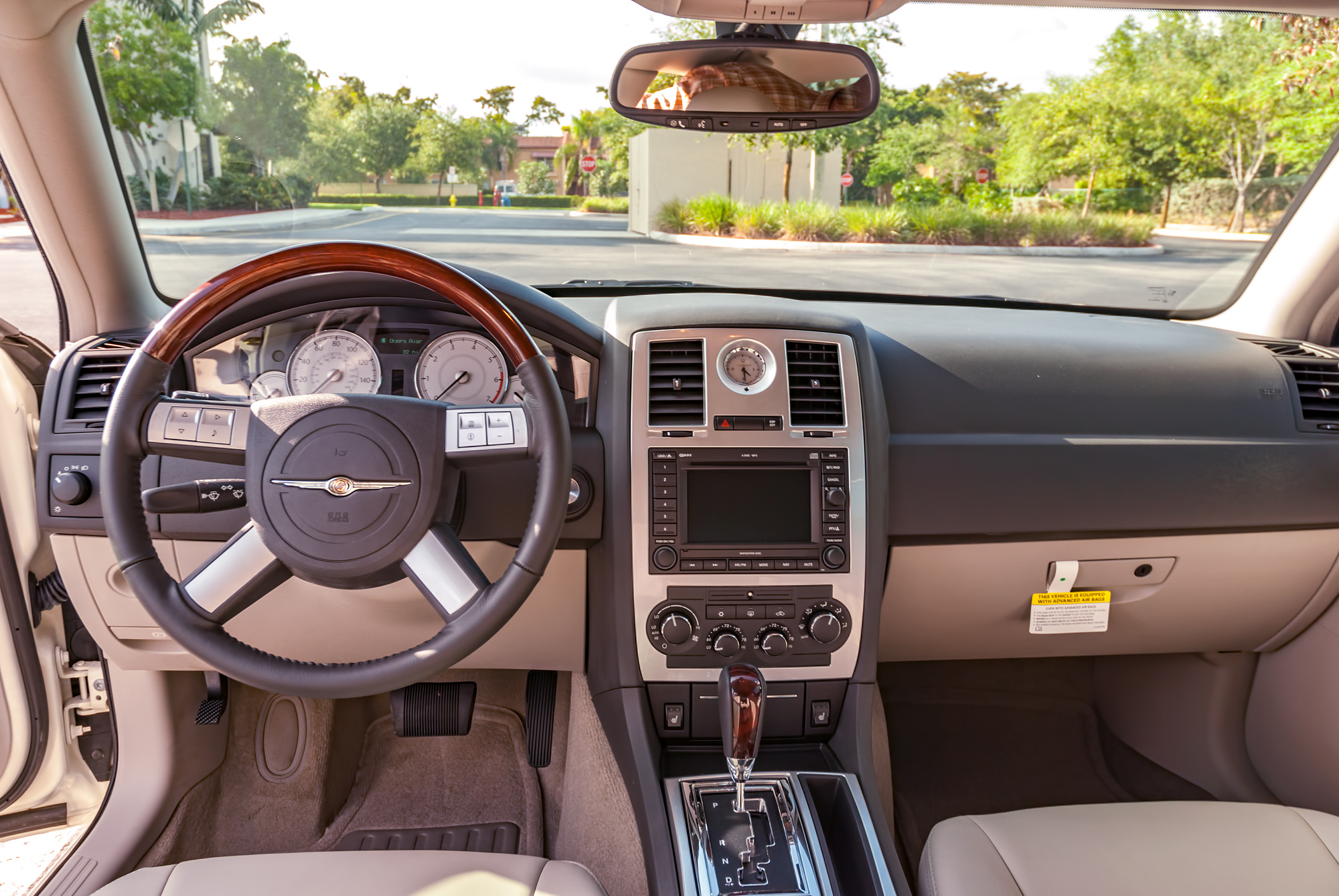
Chrysler 300C

The top-of-the-line 300C version uses a 5.7 L (345 cu in) Hemi V8. Using the Multi-Displacement System (MDS), this engine can run on four cylinders when less power is needed to reduce total fuel consumption. The USEPA-rated fuel consumption of the 300C is: 15 miles per US gallon (16 L/100 km; 18 mpg_{‑imp}) city, and 23 miles per US gallon (10 L/100 km; 28 mpg_{‑imp}) highway. When all eight cylinders are needed, the 300C can produce 340 hp (254 kW) and 390 lb⋅ft (529 N⋅m) of torque. It uses a five-speed automatic transmission and comes standard with 18-inch chrome-clad alloy wheels, Chrysler's MyGIG Infotainment System in 2008, as well as Sirius Satellite Radio and Backseat Television in 2008.

The Hemi cylinder heads necessitate a double rocker arm shaft configuration with a cam-in-block, overhead valve (OHV) pushrod design. There are two spark plugs per cylinder to promote efficient fuel/air mixture burn and reduce emissions. For 2009 and 2010, power output was increased to 360 hp (268 kW; 365 PS).

==== SRT8 ====
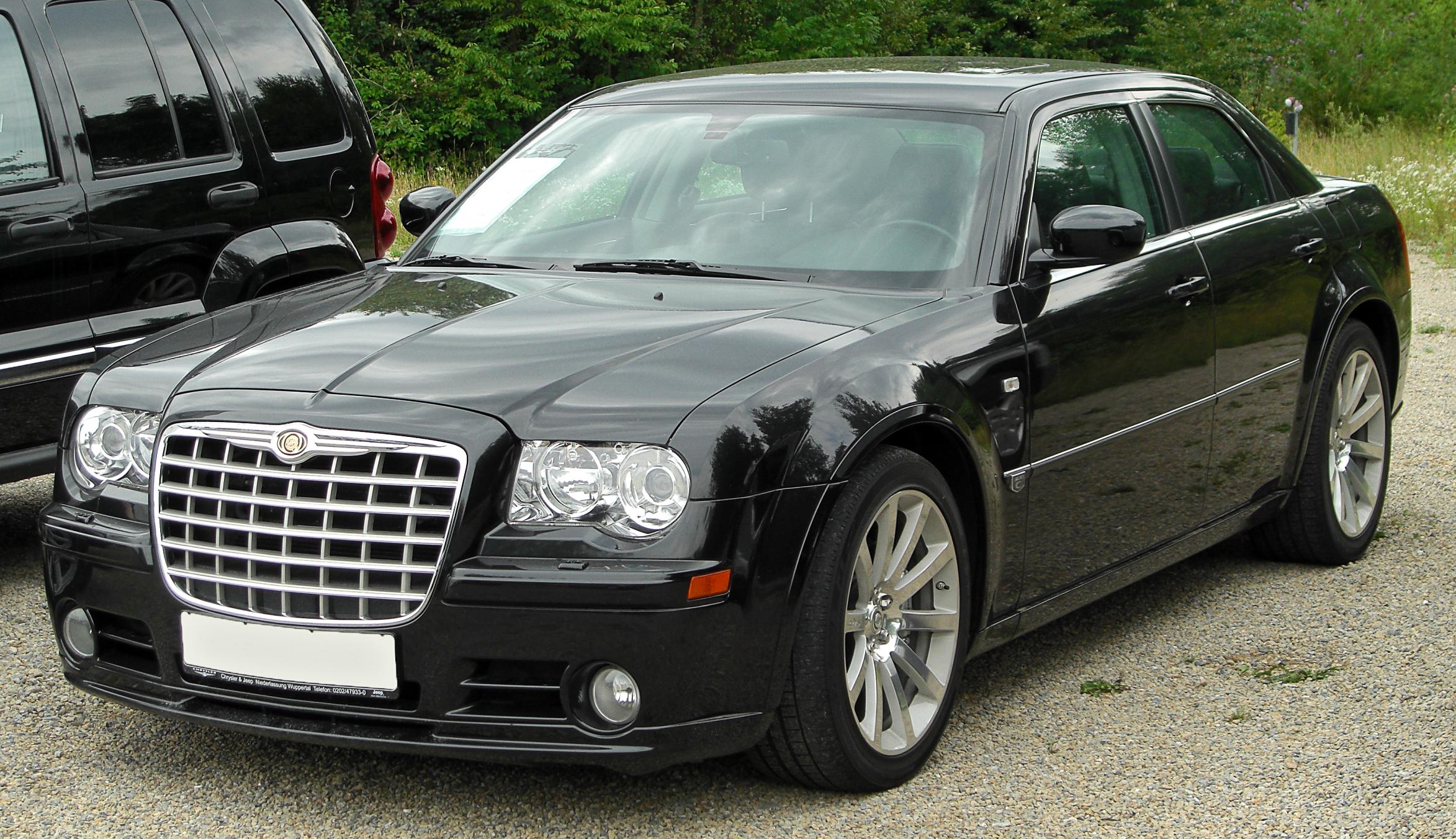
Chrysler 300C SRT8

The SRT8 model was equipped with a 6.1 L Hemi engine producing 425 hp (317 kW; 431 PS) at 6,200 rpm and 420 lb⋅ft (569 N⋅m) of torque at 4,800 rpm. The SRT8 can accelerate from 0–60 mph (97 km/h) in 4.9 seconds.

==== SRT Design ====
In 2006, Chrysler began producing a package group for the 300C model called "SRT Design”, which combined the 5.7L Hemi V8 engine with all the refinements and sports setup of the SRT 8. However, outside of North America, the SRT Design was only offered with the 3.0L V6 CRD engine. In North America, the last models of these to release were in 2009. Production kept going globally until the second generation in 2011. This model was predominantly used in the European market.

=== Other variants ===
==== Station wagon ====
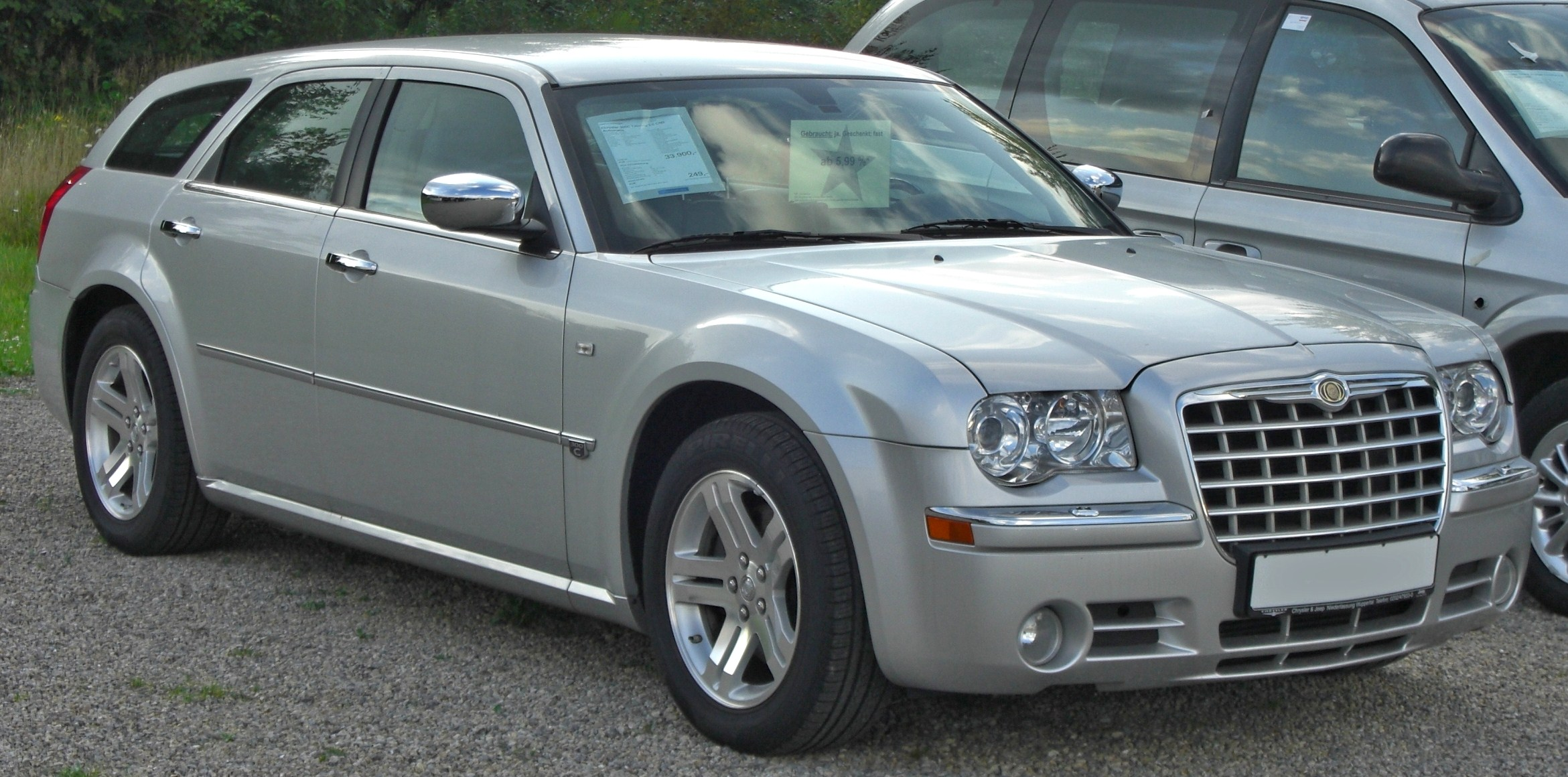
Chrysler 300C Touring 3.0 CRD

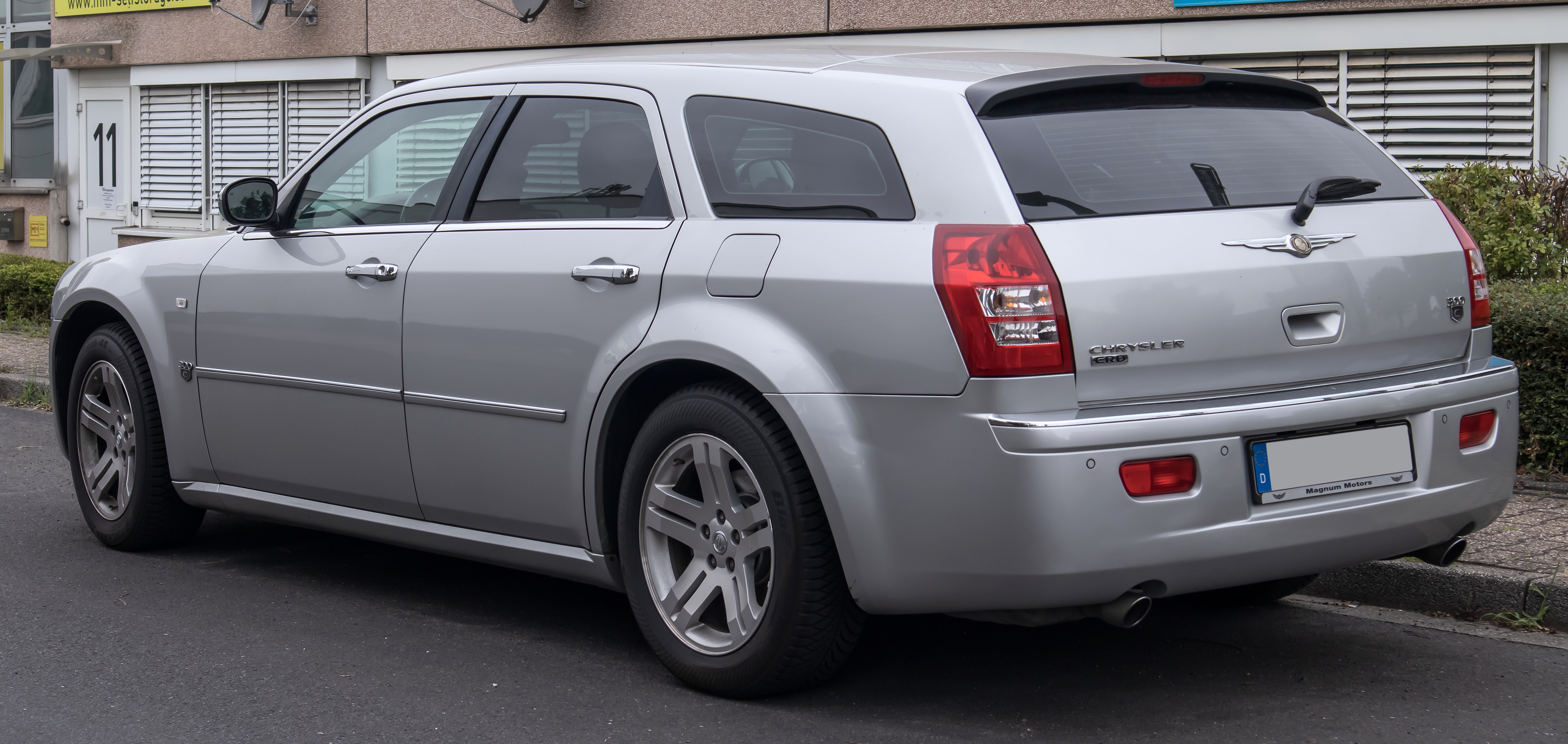
Chrysler 300C Touring 3.0 CRD

Chrysler marketed the 300C in Europe, Australia, South America, the Middle East, and Japan as both a four-door notchback sedan and a five-door station wagon. The five-door station wagon was marketed as the 300C Touring (not to be confused with the North American notchback sedan's "Touring" trim level), which shared its sheet metal aft of the C-pillar and wheel designs with the Dodge Magnum.

The base Chrysler 300 was not marketed in Europe. All cars came with the 300C body style/interior and either V6 diesel or V8 gasoline engines. The economical V6 diesel, sourced from Mercedes-Benz, was optional in Europe. Like the Magnum, an SRT8 variant of the 300C Touring with the 6.1 L Hemi engine was offered in Australia and Europe. All 300C Touring models, along with European 300C sedans and right-hand drive models, were assembled by Magna Steyr in Graz, Austria, beginning in June 2005. Steyr insisted on upgrading suspension components to suit European tastes. Dodge Charger/Magnum wheels with Chrysler center caps were used instead of the distinct wheels used on Canada-assembled models. The five-door station wagon body style was discontinued after the first generation.

==== Diesel (2006–2011) ====
In Europe and Australia, the 300C was available with a Mercedes-Benz 3.0 L diesel V6 engine (internal code OM642) rated 218 PS (160 kW; 215 hp) at 3800 rpm and 376 lb⋅ft (510 N⋅m) of torque at 1600 rpm. Fuel economy for the 300C diesel is rated at 26.2 mpg_{‑US} (9.0 L/100 km; 31.5 mpg_{‑imp}) city, 42.8 mpg_{‑US} (5.50 L/100 km; 51.4 mpg_{‑imp}) highway, and 34.9 mpg_{‑US} (6.74 L/100 km; 41.9 mpg_{‑imp}) on the combined cycle. It can accelerate from 0–60 mph (97 km/h) in 7.9 seconds while the top speed remains the same as the gasoline V6 (140 mph (225 km/h)).

The 2008 UK models included the 300C SRT Design model in sedan or Touring body, which included SRT 20-inch alloy wheels and wheel arch spats, chrome mesh grille, MyGIG satellite navigation, SRT8 steering wheel, SRT8 leather sports seats, and carbon fiber interior details.

==== ASC Helios 300 ====
ASC created a convertible version of the Chrysler 300C, dubbed the ASC Helios 300, and unveiled it at the North American International Auto Show in early 2005. Despite rumors, Chrysler confirmed that the vehicle would not be produced.

==== Executive Series 300 ====
The Walter P. Chrysler Executive Series 300 was an extended wheelbase version shown at the 2006 New York Auto Show. It added 6 inches (152 mm) to the rear passenger compartment. The wheelbase was 126 in (3,200 mm) for this edition.

==== Signature Executive Series 300 ====
The Walter P. Chrysler Signature Executive Series 300 was a package offered from the factory for the touring V6 model after 2008. It shared many features with the executive series, omitting the extra 6 inches and the rear DVD player in the passenger compartment. The Signature Touring included special badging, 18-inch chrome-clad aluminum wheels, 6.5-inch MyGIG REN 430(N) touchscreen DVD player with optional uConnect+navigation, Boston Acoustic six-speaker sound system, heated leather-trimmed seats, heated and powered mirrors, eight-way power seats, power-adjustable pedals, and sunroof. It was offered for an additional CA$2,240 in Canada.

==== Heritage Edition 300C ====
The Chrysler 300C Heritage Edition debuted in 2006 and was a performance-oriented trim that used the 5.7 Hemi and had styling cues from the Chrysler 300 "letter series" of the 1950s and the 1960s.

==== Beijing Auto T8 ====
The Beijing Auto T8 was a Chinese limousine version of the Chrysler 300. Beijing Auto produced two prototypes. The T8 got a new Cadillac-style nose and a new rear end; however, the rest of the design remained unchanged from the standard Chrysler 300. The only changes to the interior were a revised steering wheel with an updated logo. Beijing Auto did not have the right to continue to use the platform(s) or engine(s) necessary to produce the vehicle, and the T8's development and production prospects ended in 2009.

=== Reception and legacy ===
The Chrysler 300's driving characteristics were generally well-received. The ride of the car was described as "steady, comfortable, and a study in control." Reviewers said the car drove "a lot like a Benz" due to the heavy use of German engineering and involvement of Mercedes-Benz in the development process during Chrysler and Daimler's partnership. The car was also described as "impressively stable at high speed" by journalists at speeds even in excess of 150+ MPH on German autobahns, on par with other German sedans of the era. Again, such attributes could be attributed to the car's German underpinnings. However, a real weakness in the car's driving experience was "numb steering," which many journalists claimed made the car feel "capable, but disconnected."

In the UK, the BBC's Top Gear team described the 300C as "something different with a bit of kitsch gangster cool." They praised the spacious and well-equipped interior, even calling it a "re-shelled German car with an American body," and the low price while criticizing the quality of certain materials, numb steering, and low engine torque of the V6 models. The first generation model was popular with British buyers who regarded it as the "poor man's Bentley."

In the US, the 300C enjoyed a wave of popularity in the mid-2000s, aided by celebrity owners (including then-US President Barack Obama,) and appearances in music videos. In 2004, rapper Snoop Dogg famously called then-Chrysler CEO, Dieter Zetsche, asking for his own 300C; he later appeared in a commercial for the car alongside Lee Iacocca. The 300C was ranked No. 12 in a Complex.com article, "The 25 Most Iconic Hip-Hop Cars", due to its popularity in many hip-hop music videos following its introduction. Chrysler 300 designer Ralph Gilles reflected on the vehicle's success in 2008, saying that the "300 turned out to be a bit of an icon for Chrysler."

=== Awards ===
The 300C was the 2005 Motor Trend Car of the Year. It was on Car and Driver's Ten Best list for both 2005 and 2006. Automobile Magazine named it Automobile of the Year.

It also won the North American Car of the Year award. It was voted Canadian Car of the Year by automobile journalists as the Best New Luxury Car.

Receiving numerous other recognitions during its debut year, it was promoted as being one of the most awarded new cars ever. The 300C was also included in the finalists for 2005 World Car of the Year, but final points total put it in fifth place equal to the BMW 1 Series.

== Second generation (LD; 2011) ==
Second generation (LD)
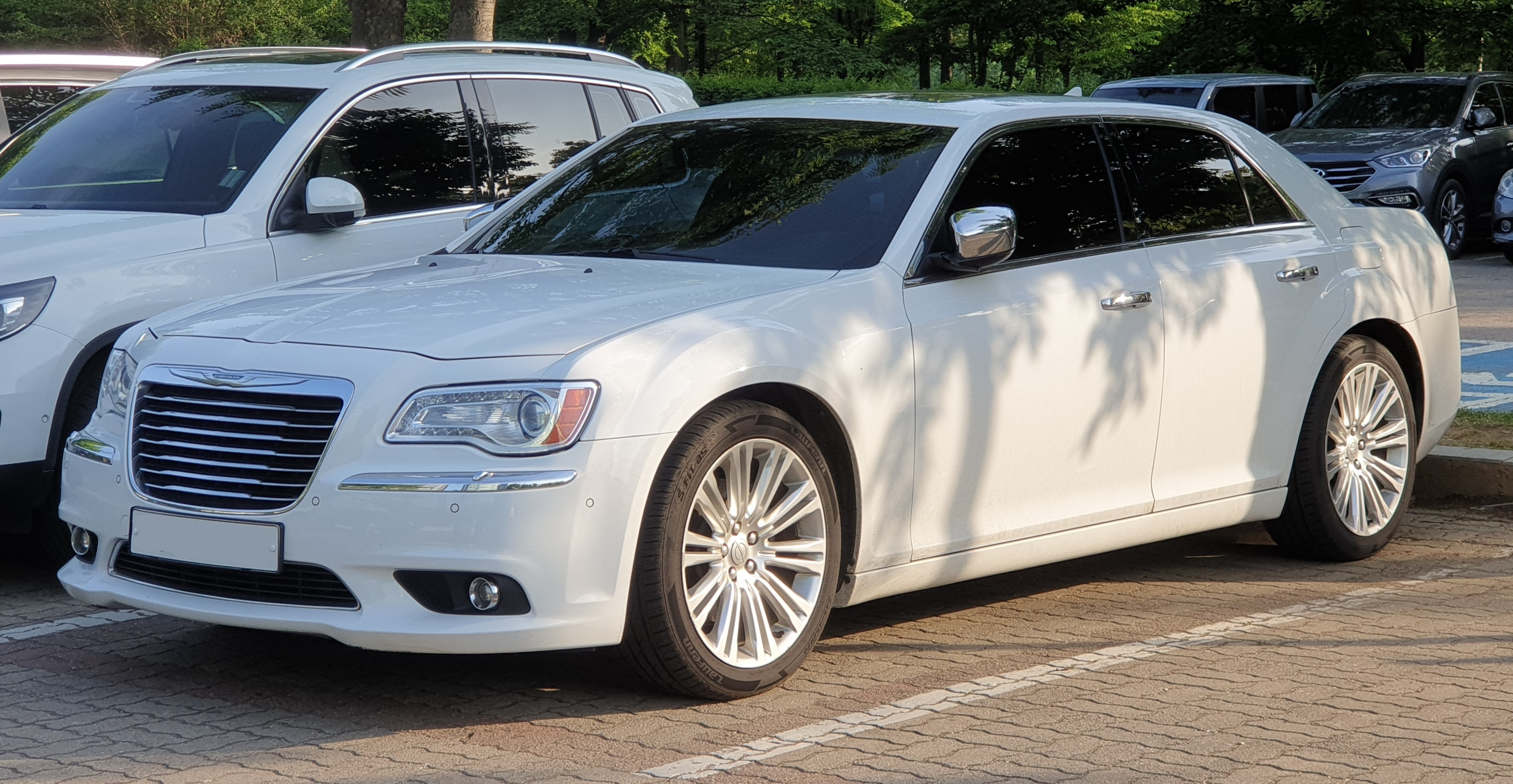
- Pre-facelift

Overview
- Also called: Lancia Thema (Europe; 2011–2014); Chrysler 300C
- Production: December 2010–December 9, 2023
- Model years: 2011–2023
- Assembly: Canada: Brampton, Ontario (Brampton Assembly)
- Designer: Lou Gasevski

Body and chassis
- Body style: 4-door notchback sedan
- Platform: Chrysler LD platform
- Related: Dodge Charger; Dodge Challenger; Mercedes-Benz E-Class (W211)

Powertrain
- Engine: 3.0 L Pentastar V6 (China); 3.6 L Pentastar V6; 5.7 L Hemi V8; 6.4 L Hemi V8; 3.0 L VM Motori A630 CRD turbodiesel V6
- Transmission: 5-speed Mercedes-Benz 5G-Tronic automatic 8-speed ZF 8HP45 automatic 8-speed ZF 8HP70 automatic

Dimensions
- Wheelbase: 120.2 in (3,053 mm)
- Length: 198.6 in (5,044 mm)
- Width: 75.1 in (1,908 mm)
- Height: 58.4 in (1,483 mm)

A redesigned 300 was introduced in 2011 as a four-door sedan. However, the core platform of the car, now called the 'LD' while updated, was still closely related to the original 'LX' platform. While the suspension was revised, the front suspension is still derived from the design of the W220 Mercedes-Benz S-Class and the 5-link rear design from the W211 E-Class. Production ended on December 8, 2023.

=== Exterior design ===
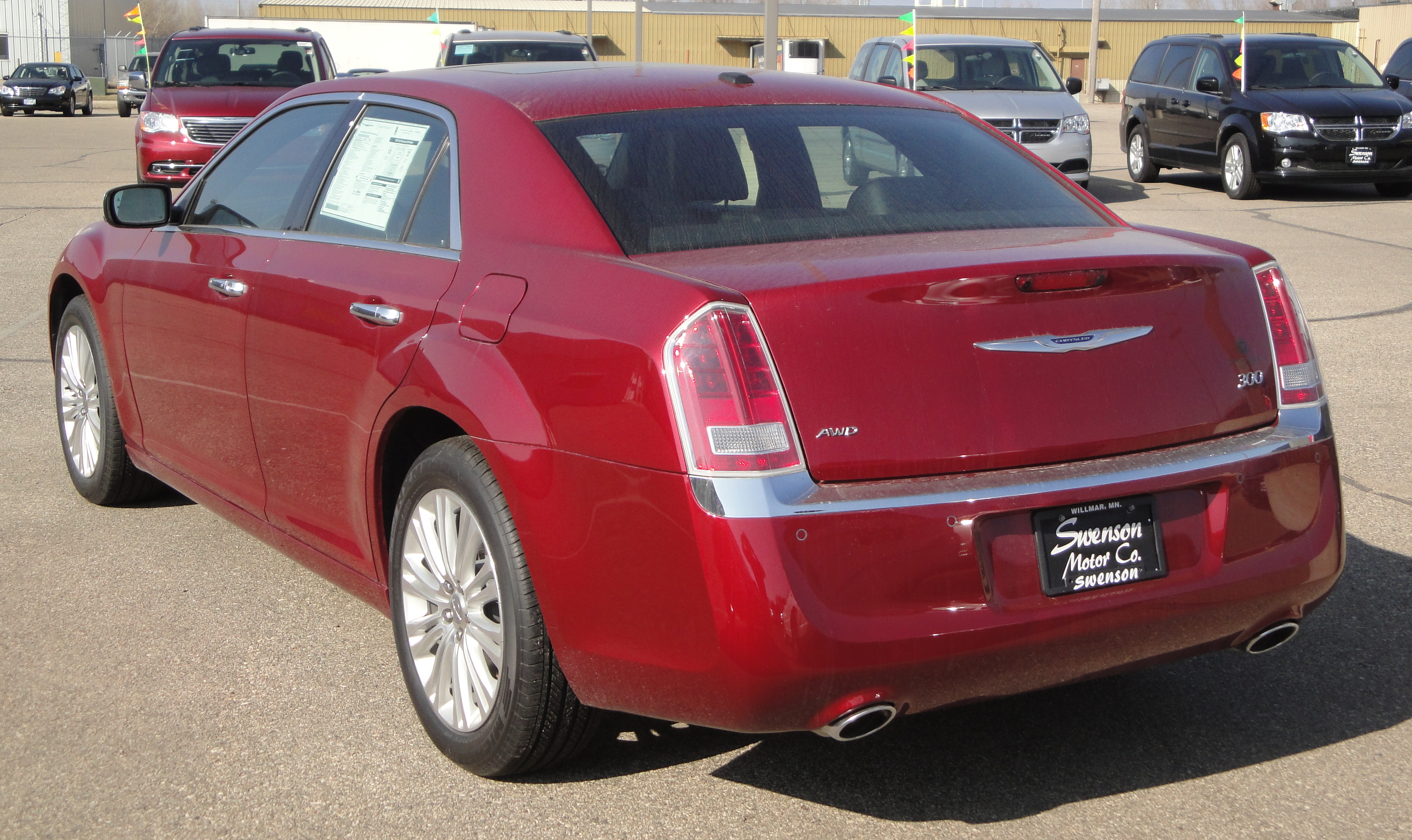
Chrysler 300 Limited (US; pre-facelift)

Exterior changes included revised sheet metal, thinner roof pillars, a more raked windshield, bi-xenon HID projector headlights, LED daytime running strips within the headlights, new taillights with LEDs and a horizontally slotted front grille with an updated version of the Chrysler winged brand emblem. Options included a dual-pane panoramic sunroof and 20-inch polished aluminum wheels.

=== Variants ===
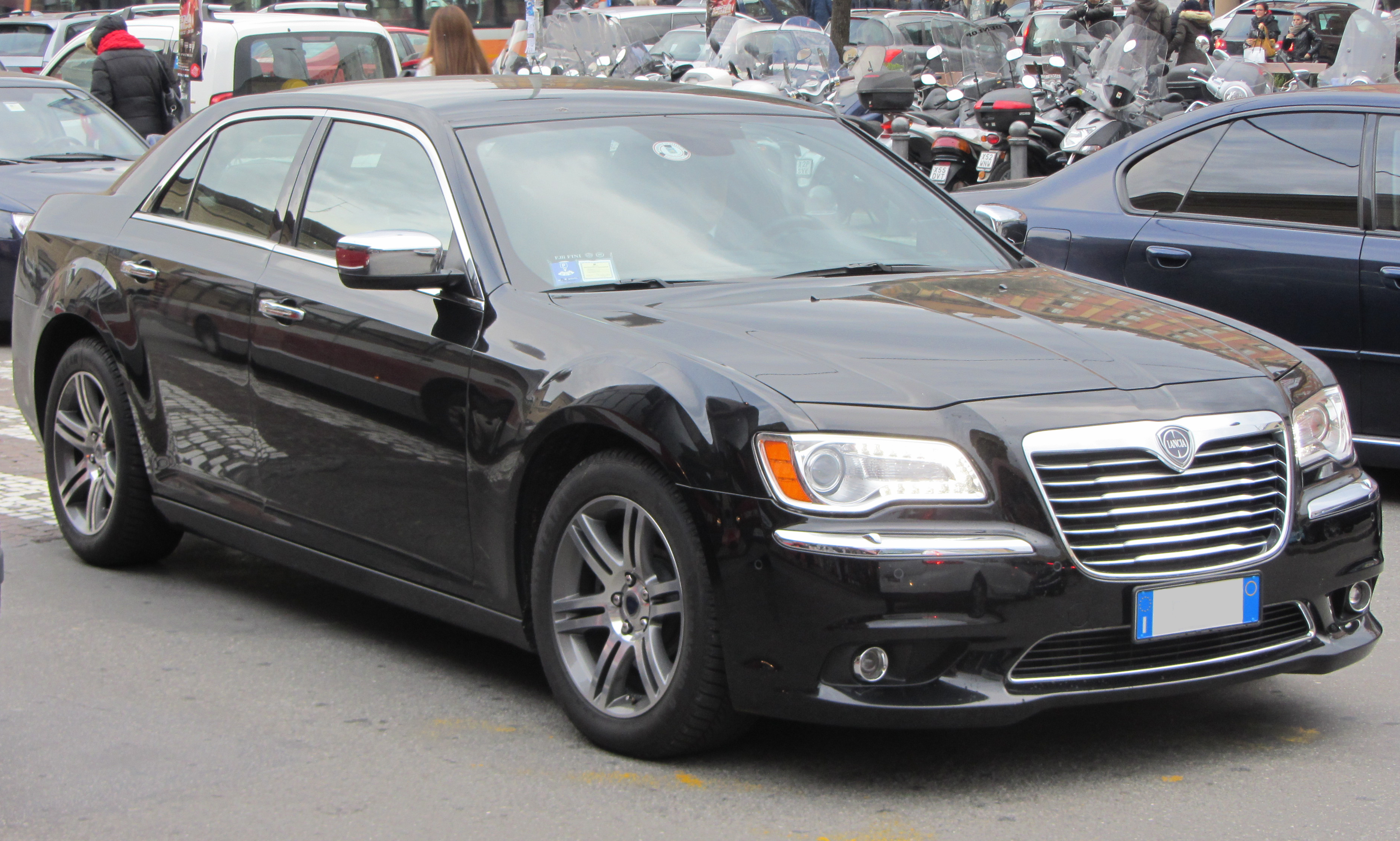
Lancia Thema

The 2011 model was offered in Touring, Limited, 300C, and 300C AWD trim levels. Touring and Limited trims included the Pentastar V6, while the 300C line offered a standard 5.7 L Hemi.

A new 300C Executive Series luxury trim level was introduced alongside a new 300S trim at the 2011 New York International Auto Show. The sport-themed 300S featured black treatment for the grille and headlamps, 20-inch polished-face aluminum wheels with black painted pockets, 10-speaker Beats by Dr. Dre sound system, and steering wheel mounted paddle shifters. The Executive/Luxury Series was also sold in Europe, rebranded as the Lancia Thema from 2011 until 2014.

For the 2021 model year, the 300C and Limited trim levels were dropped, leaving the Touring, Touring L, and 300S, which included the previous year's Red S Appearance Package as standard.

==== SRT ====
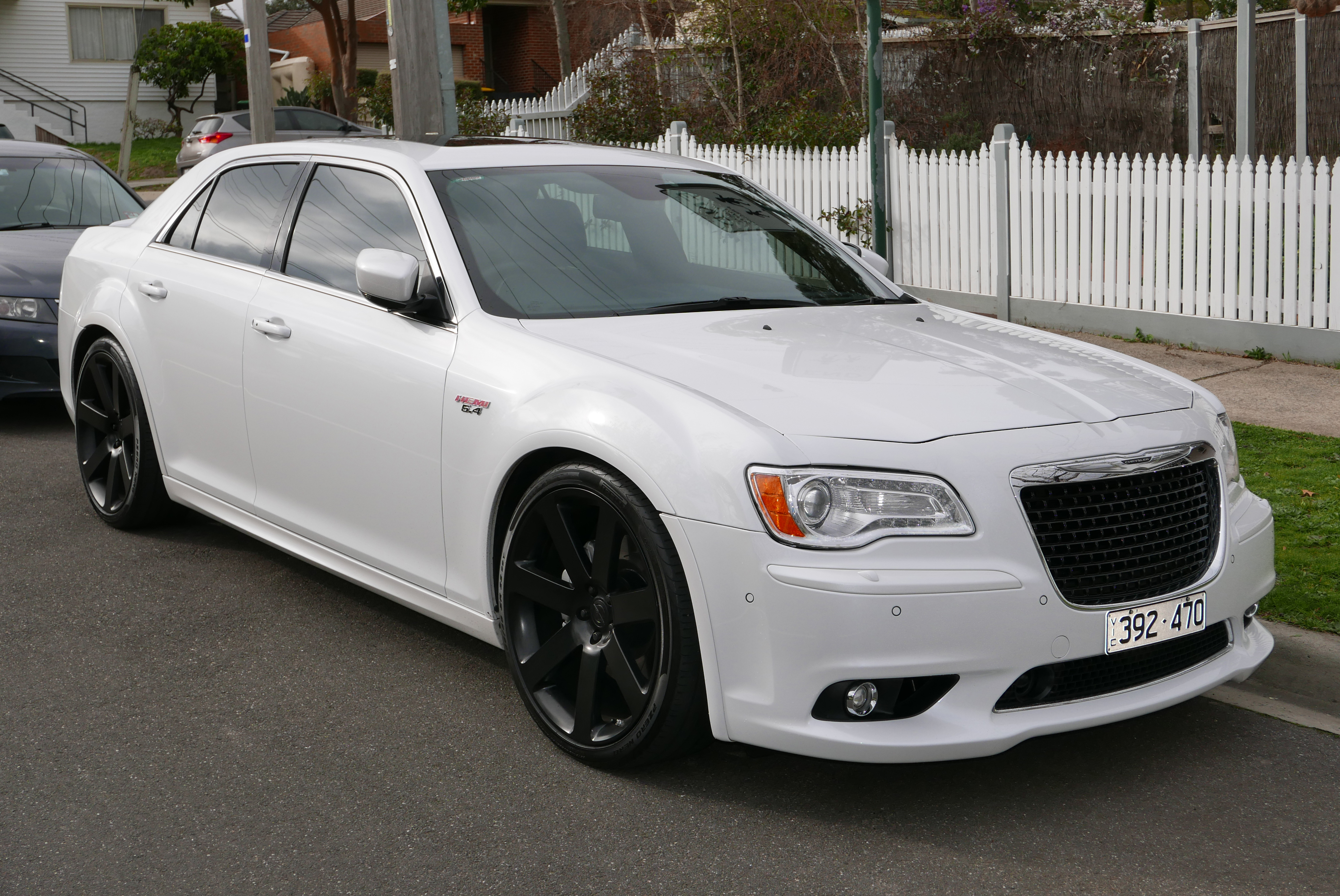
Chrysler 300 SRT8 (Australia)

An SRT version was unveiled at the 2011 New York International Auto Show, featuring the 6.4 L 392 Hemi V8 engine.

The 6.4 L 392 Hemi engine is also used in other Chrysler Group SRT vehicles such as the Dodge Charger and Challenger. With 470 hp (350 kW), the new 300 SRT can go from 0 to 60 mph (97 km/h) in the low 4-second range.

In addition to the increase in power, the SRT receives specific exterior trim including a lower front fascia, large exhaust tips, body-color instead of chrome trim, and 20-inch (508 mm) aluminum wheels. The car also gets a lowered, sportier suspension setup and a large Brembo brake package.

The 300 SRT (or SRT8) was discontinued for the 2015 model year in the United States, but continued to be sold in Australia, New Zealand and the Middle East. In Australia, the 300 SRT Core (a base level trim offered in the Australian and New Zealand markets) was utilised by the New South Wales Police Force as a significant part of their Traffic and Highway Patrol fleet. These have since been withdrawn from service. The 300 SRT was sold in left and right-hand drive abroad. After a decade of falling sales in Australia, production of right-hand-drive versions ended in 2021.

=== Powertrain ===
The predecessors' 2.7 and 3.5 L engines were replaced with Chrysler's new 3.6 L Pentastar V6 engine producing 292 hp (218 kW) and 260 lb⋅ft (353 N⋅m) of torque. The 5.7 L Hemi V8 engine remained available with 363 hp (271 kW). A 3.0 L VM Motori V6 turbodiesel is also available in Europe and Australia.

Beginning with the 2012 model year, all V6 models were equipped with the 8-speed 845RE Chrysler TorqueFlite automatic transmission, licensed from ZF Friedrichshafen.

Chrysler
Model	Engine	Displacement	Power at rpm	Torque at rpm	Years
Touring	3.6 V6 Pentastar	3,604 cc (219.9 cu in)	296 PS (218 kW; 292 hp) at 6,350 rpm	352 N⋅m (260 lbf⋅ft) at 4,800 rpm	2011–2023
Limited	3.6 V6 Pentastar	3,604 cc (219.9 cu in)	296 PS (218 kW; 292 hp) at 6,350 rpm	352 N⋅m (260 lbf⋅ft) at 4,800 rpm	2011–2023
300S	3.6 V6 Pentastar	3,604 cc (219.9 cu in)	304 PS (224 kW; 300 hp)	358 N⋅m (264 lbf⋅ft) at 4,800 rpm	2011–2023
300C and 300S (2012)	5.7 V8 Hemi	5,654 cc (345.0 cu in)	368 PS (271 kW; 363 hp) at 5,150 rpm	534 N⋅m (394 lb⋅ft) at 4,250 rpm	2011–2023
300 SRT8	6.4L 392 Hemi V8 engine	6,430 cc (392 cu in)	477 PS (351 kW; 470 hp) at 6,000 rpm	637 N⋅m (470 lb⋅ft) at 4,300 rpm	2012–2014
300C (2023)	6.4L 392 Hemi V8 engine	6,430 cc (392 cu in)	492 PS (362 kW; 485 hp) at 6,100 rpm	644 N⋅m (475 lb⋅ft) at 4,100 rpm	2023 (Limited 2,200 Units)
Lancia/Chrysler UK
Gasoline	3.6 V6 Pentastar	3,604 cc (219.9 cu in)	286 PS (210 kW; 282 hp) at 6,350 rpm	340 N⋅m (251 lbf⋅ft) at 4,650 rpm	2011–2014
Diesel	3.0 V6 VM Motori A630	2,987 cc (182.3 cu in)	190 PS (140 kW; 187 hp) at 4,000 rpm	440 N⋅m (325 lbf⋅ft) at 1,600–2,800 rpm	2011–2014
Diesel	3.0 V6 VM Motori A630	2,987 cc (182.3 cu in)	239 PS (176 kW; 236 hp) at 4,000 rpm	550 N⋅m (406 lbf⋅ft) at 1,800–2,800 rpm	2011–2014

- Source for Lancia

=== Interior changes ===
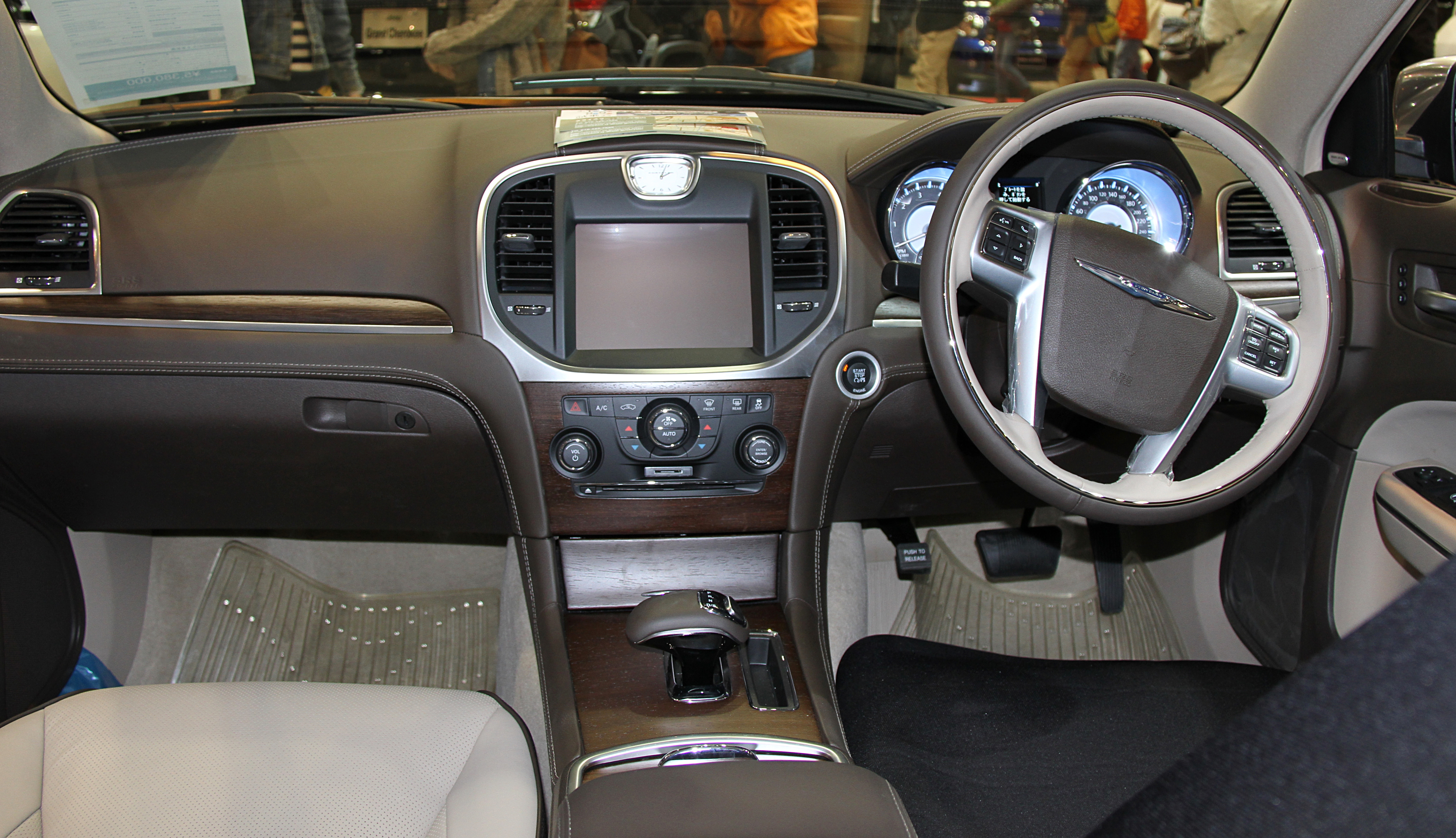
Interior (pre-facelift)

Interior changes included a revised instrument panel with localized "soft-touch" materials, 8.4-inch Uconnect Touch, a new steering wheel and center console, and standard leather seating on all trim levels. Both seat-mounted and curtain-side airbags were standard.

=== 2015 facelift ===
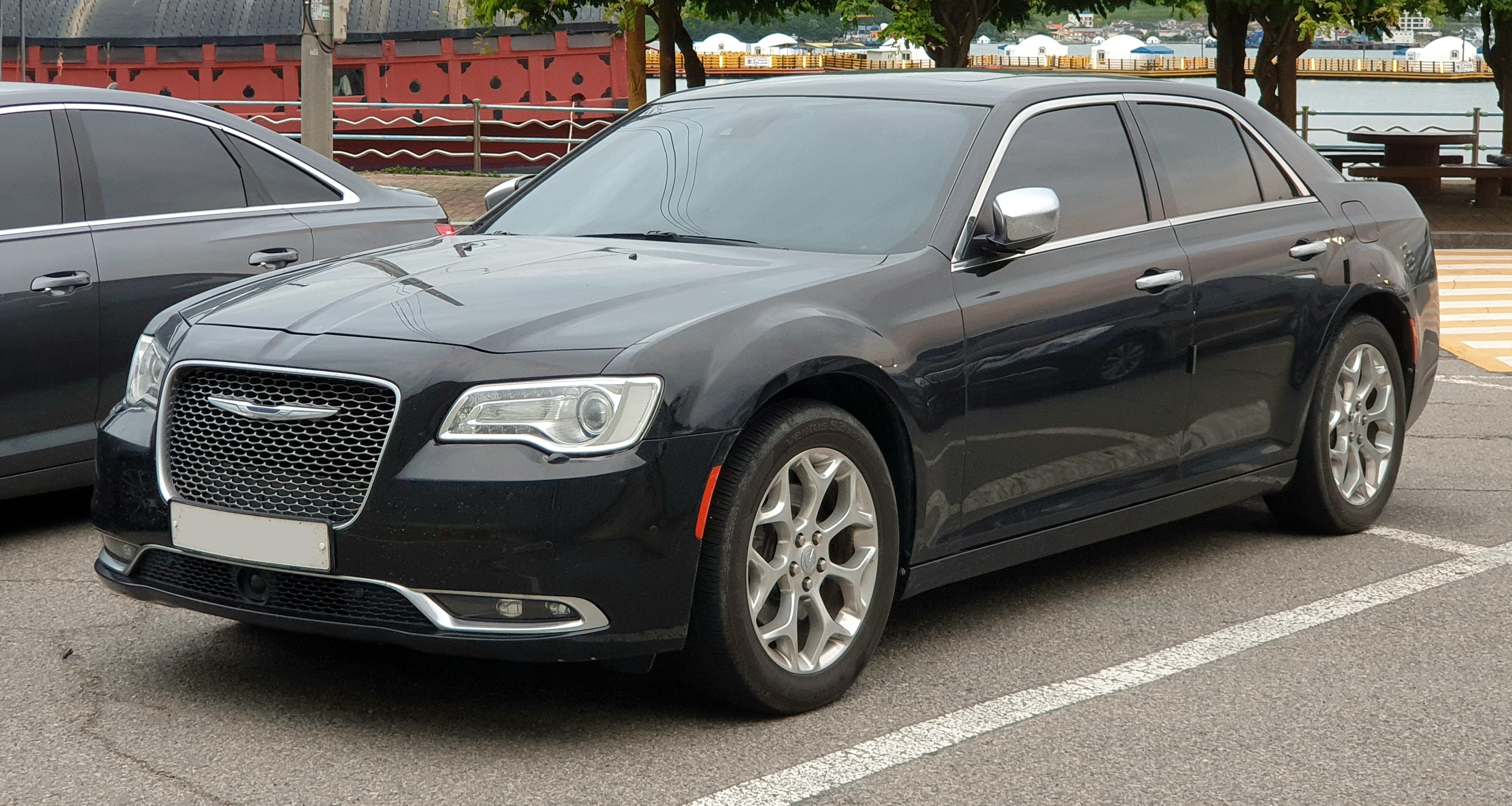

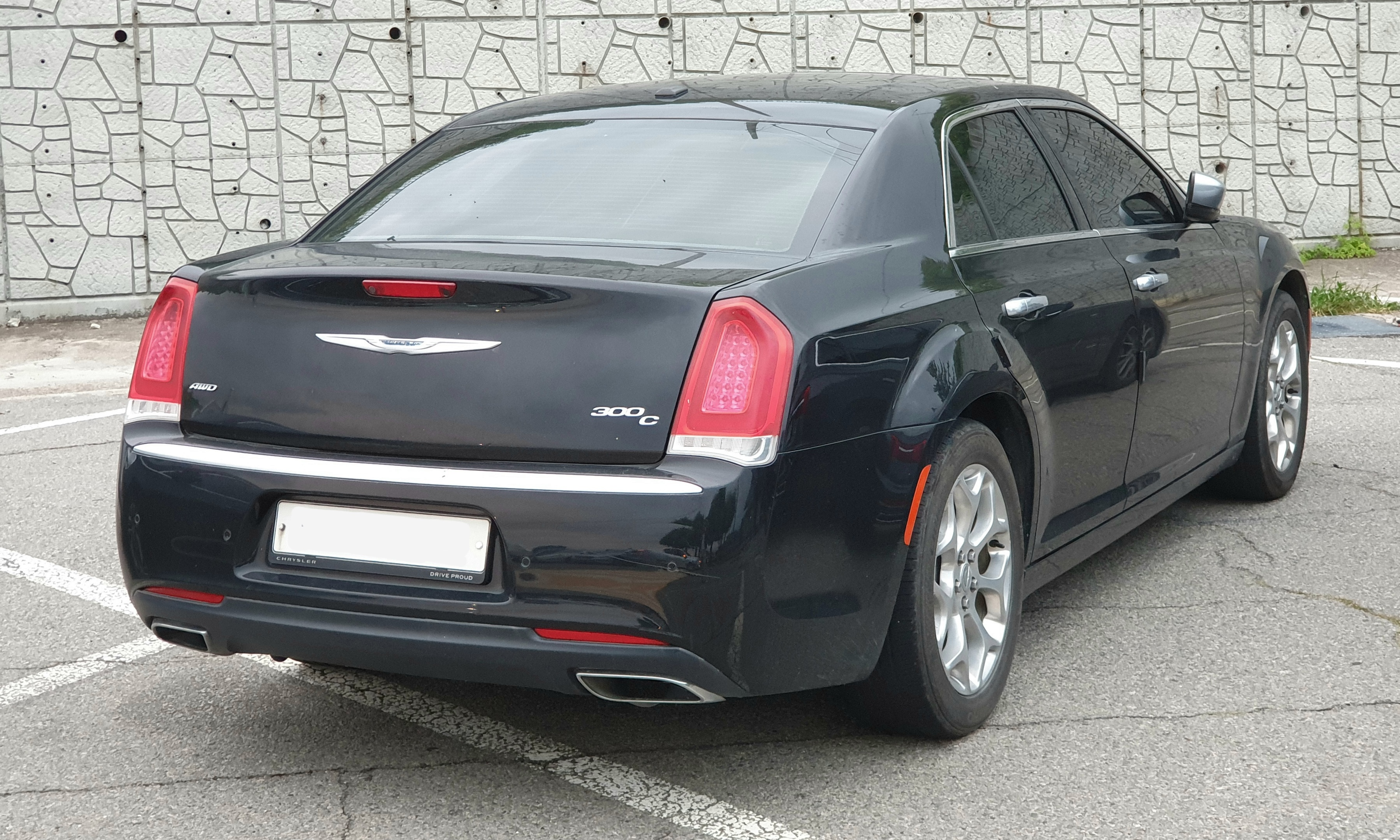
Chrysler 300C (facelift)

In late 2014, a facelift version of the 300 was introduced. This introduced new features such as:

- Full speed range Adaptive Cruise Control with Stop
- Full-Speed Forward Collision Warning (FCW) with Active Braking
- Lane Departure Warning with Lane Keep Assist
- Updated Uconnect Systems with Bluetooth and Voice Command
- 7-inch electronic instrument cluster
- TorqueFlite eight-speed automatic transmission
- Restyled front and rear fascias
- New 3-spoke steering wheel design
- New black and silver mesh chrome grille

=== Marketing ===
As part of the 2011 Chrysler 300 advertising campaign, three TV commercials were produced. "Homecoming" featured Detroit Lions defensive lineman Ndamukong Suh driving through his rainy hometown of Portland, Oregon, in his new 2011 Chrysler 300, retracing his humble beginnings. "Attitude" featured John Varvatos seeking inspiration at a record store in Brooklyn taking a record under his arm and into his Chrysler 300. "Good Things" featured Dr. Dre driving through the streets of Los Angeles in a Beats by Dre equipped 2012 Chrysler 300.

The "See It Through"' TV commercial featured the Chrysler 300 and notable Detroit locals, including former Detroit Lion Ndamukong Suh and a poem written in 1917 by Edgar Guest titled "See It Through."

=== 300S Turbine ===
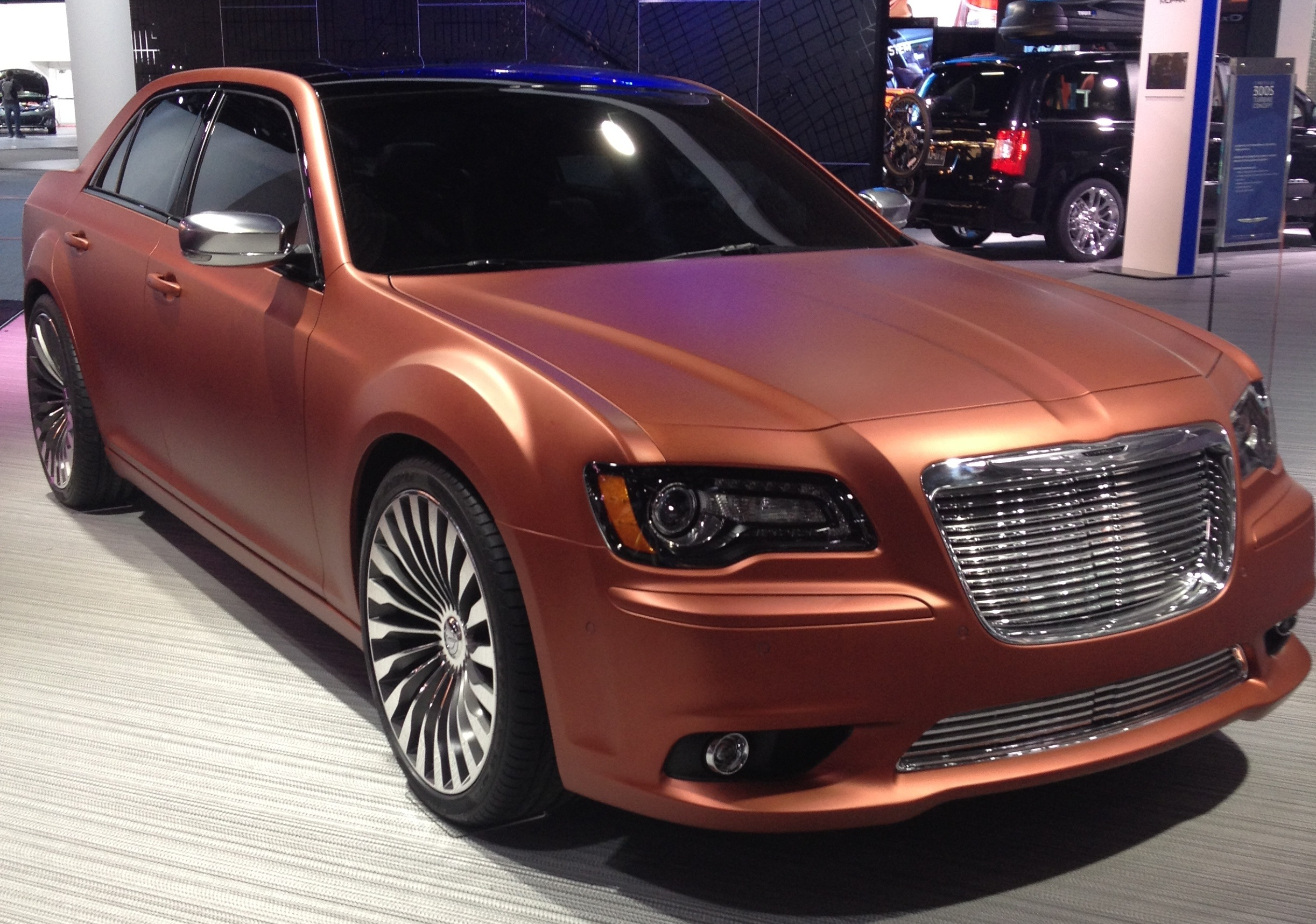

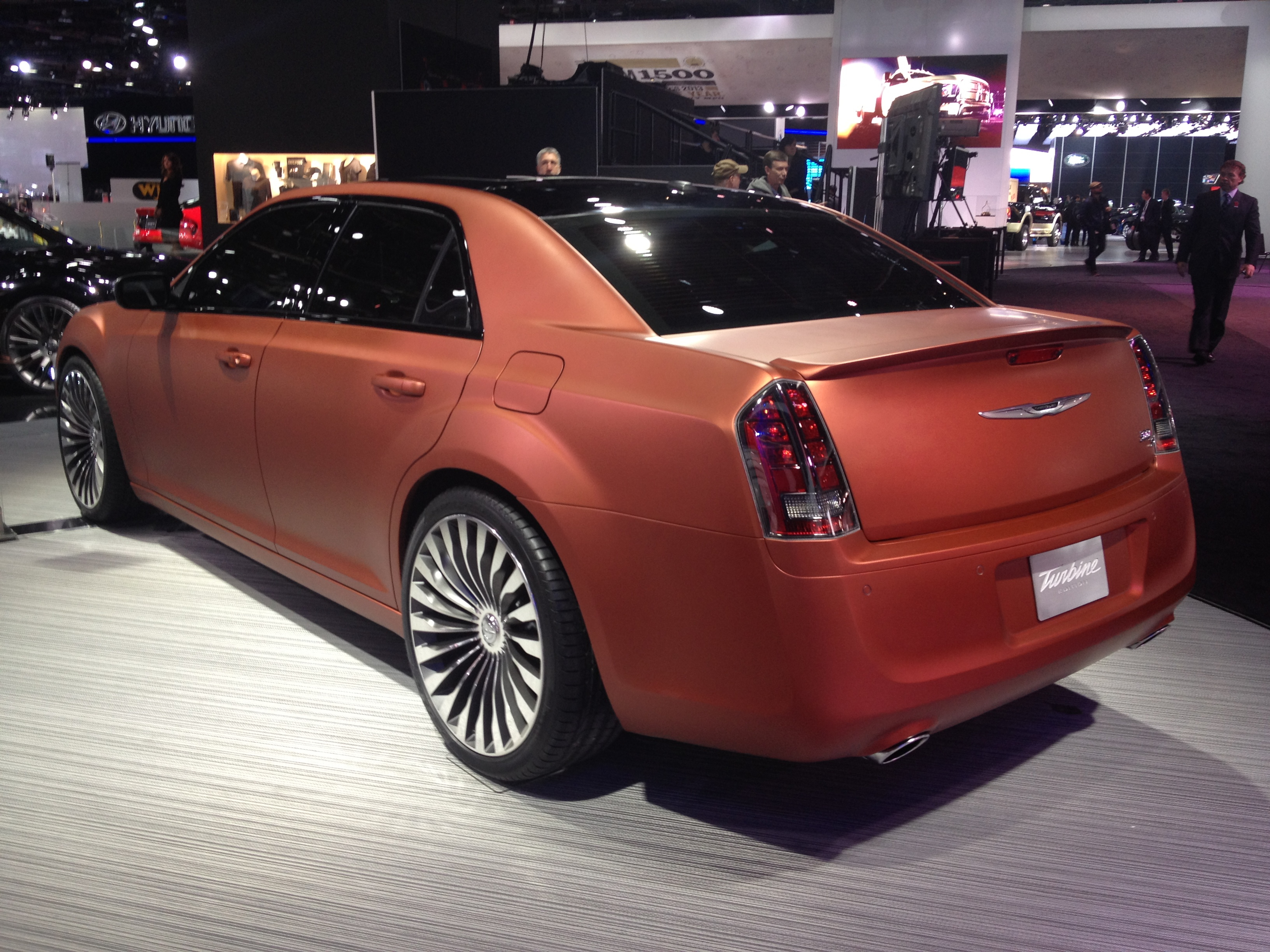
The 300S Turbine at its presentation in Detroit in 2013

At the Detroit Motor Show in 2013, Chrysler presented a 300S paying homage to the 1964 Chrysler Turbine. It was finished in two-tone bronze and black, with an over-chrome grille and a 22-inch wheel design reminiscent of the turbine motif.

=== Recall ===
In March 2024, Stellantis issued a voluntary recall on Dodge Charger and Chrysler 300 cars, between model years 2018 to 2021. The recall affected more than 284,000 cars. The recall related to the side curtain airbag inflators, where some of the modules could rupture and send Shrapnel pieces into the vehicle, injuring the occupants.

=== Discontinuation ===
In 2022, Stellantis confirmed that the Chrysler 300 sedan would be discontinued after the 2023 model year due to poor sales and due to the company's plans to focus its future on electric vehicles rather than fossil fuel-powered vehicles. At the time, Stellantis reportedly had plans to replace the 300 with a Chrysler-badged all-electric vehicle. Then-Chrysler CEO Chris Feuell has hinted at a successor inspired by the Halcyon concept.

Production ended December 8, 2023, with the final vehicle being a Velvet Red 300C.

=== Safety ===
==== Euro NCAP ====
The Lancia version was safety tested by Euro NCAP in autumn 2011 with the following results:

Euro NCAP test results* Lancia Thema (2011)
Test	Points	%
Overall:	5 /5 stars	
Adult occupant:	29.7	83%
Child occupant:	37.7	77%
Pedestrian:	21.3	59%
Safety assist:	5	71%

==== IIHS ====
The 2022 Chrysler 300 was tested by the Insurance Institute for Highway Safety (IIHS):

IIHS 2022 Chrysler 300 scores:
Small overlap front (Driver):	Marginal	
Moderate overlap front	Good	
Side (original test)	Good	
Roof strength	Good	
Head restraints & seats	Good	
Headlights	Poor	
Front crash prevention (Vehicle-to-Vehicle)	Superior	optional
Child seat anchors (LATCH) ease of use	Acceptable	

== Sales ==
Calendar year	United States	Canada	Europe (Note: Europe: 2020 EU 27 + UK + Switzerland + Norway + Iceland)	Mexico	Australia	Europe as Lancia Thema (Note: Europe: 2020 EU 27 + UK + Switzerland + Norway + Iceland)
2004	112,930	10,048	2,460			
2005	144,068	14,654	5,520	1,001	363	
2006	143,647	13,316	14,186	1,024	1,864	
2007	120,636	10,021	13,463	660	1,645	
2008	62,352	7,443	7,244	412	1,087	
2009	38,606	5,234	3,428	200	822	
2010	37,116	4,180	3,507	218	874	
2011	36,285	3,045	504	308	360	699
2012	70,747	5,760	292	293	1,206	1,729
2013	57,724	5,375	221	157	2,508	2,236
2014	53,382	4,117	88	116	1,580	392
2015	53,109	4,443	10	139	880	28
2016	53,241	3,662	6	87	460	19
2017	51,237	4,332	8	77	257	
2018	46,593	3,512	6	39	250	
2019	29,213	1,949		5	292	
2020	16,653	447		5	218	
2021	16,662	795				
2022	14,087	2,306				
2023	13,169	1,522				
2024	5,295	265				

== See also ==
- Chrysler 300 letter series
- Chrysler 300 non-letter series
