= Chrysler Chronos =

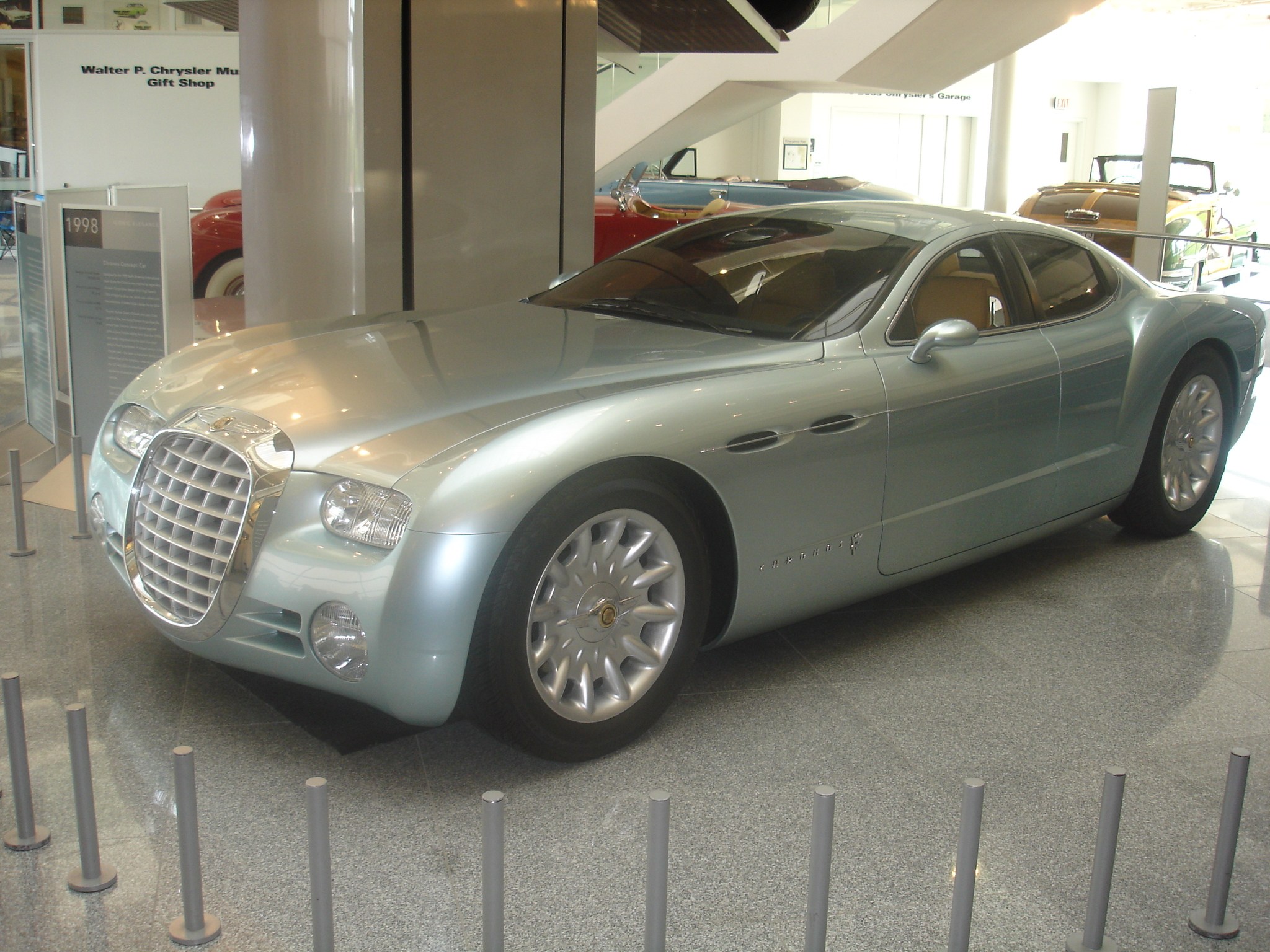

Overview
- Manufacturer: Chrysler
- Production: 1998

Body and chassis
- Class: Concept car
- Body style: 4-door notchback sedan
- Layout: FR layout
- Platform: Chrysler LX platform

Powertrain
- Engine: 6.0 L (366 ci) OHC V10
- Transmission: 4-speed automatic

Dimensions
- Wheelbase: 130.9 in (3327 mm)
- Length: 205.4 in (5217 mm)
- Width: 76.5 in (1942 mm)
- Height: 52.7 in (1338 mm)
- Curb weight: 4209 lb (1909 kg)

The Chrysler Chronos is a concept car created by Chrysler in 1998. The Chronos has a similarity in design to the 1953 Chrysler D'Elegance concept car as well as a similarity to the production model Chrysler 300C.

== Overview ==
The design of the concept has some similarity to the classic 1950s Virgil Exner-era cars. It features an aluminium wheels (when rotating the logo aligns evenly, idea later appeared on the Phantom), a huge wheelbase and RWD layout.

The Chronos is equipped with a naturally aspirated 6.0L (366 ci) OHC V10 engine (built from three 4.7L V8's) with around 350 horsepower (58.3 bhp/Liter).

== Gallery ==
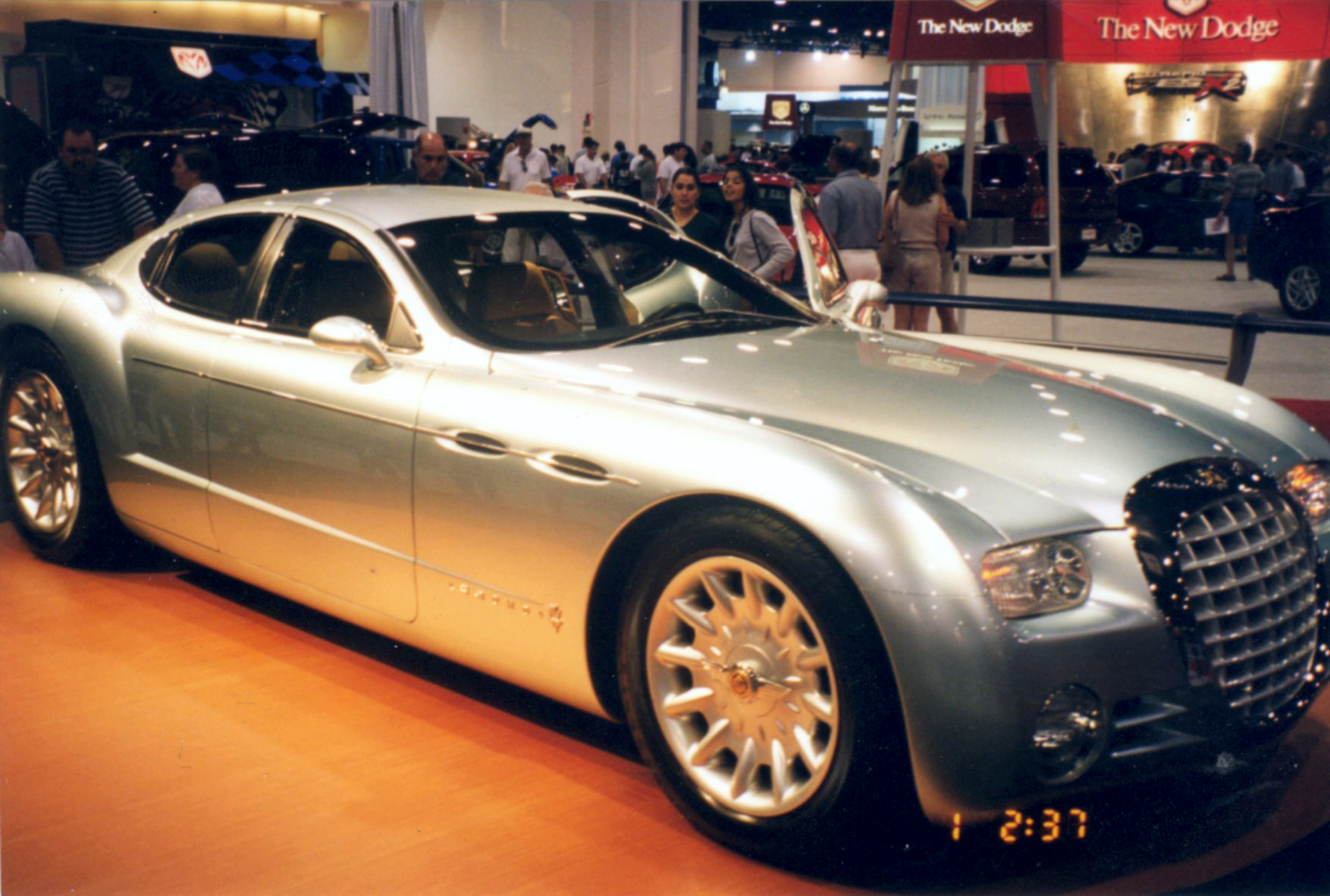
Chrysler Chronos at the 1998 Miami International Auto Show

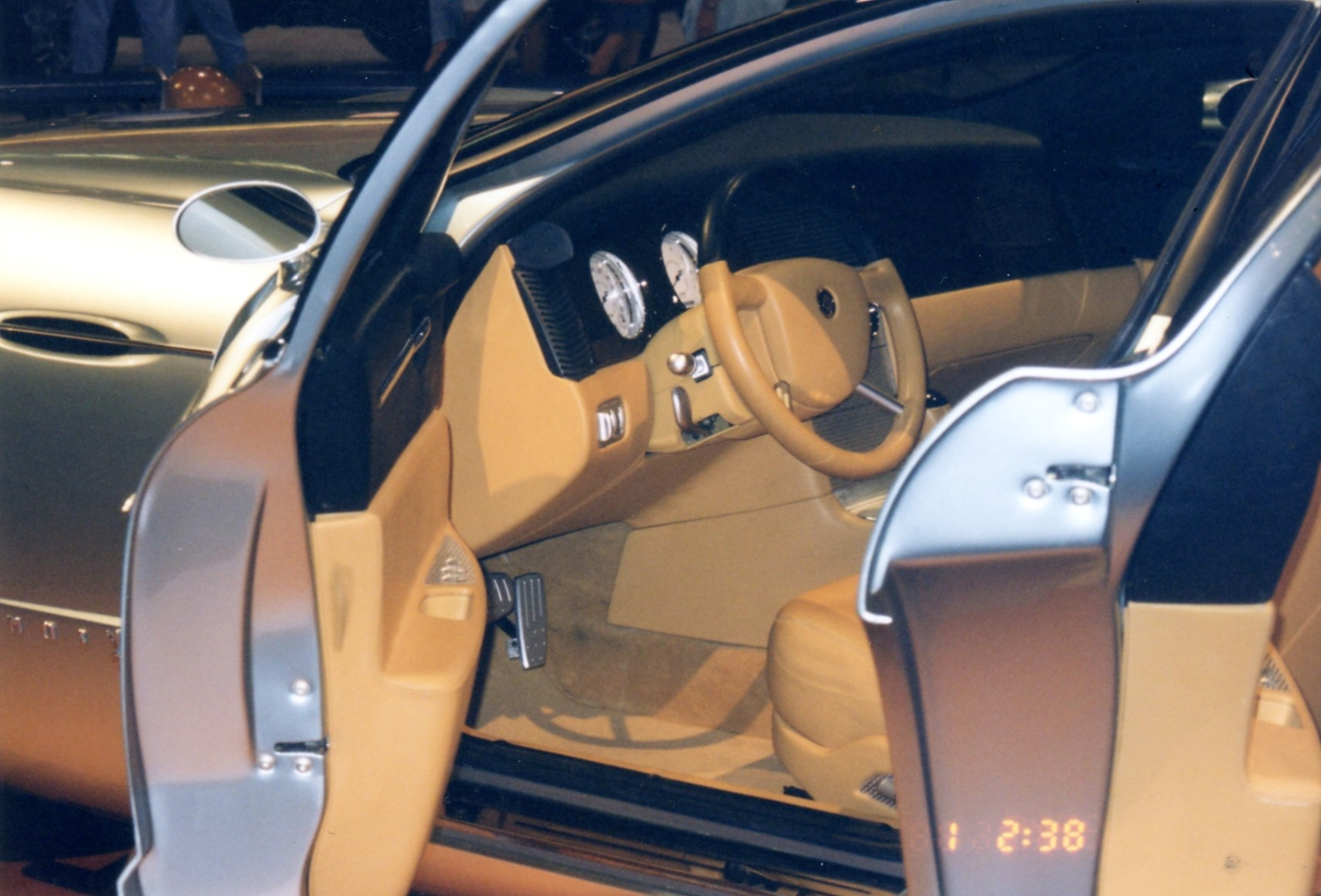
Interior view
