= Chrysler Halcyon =

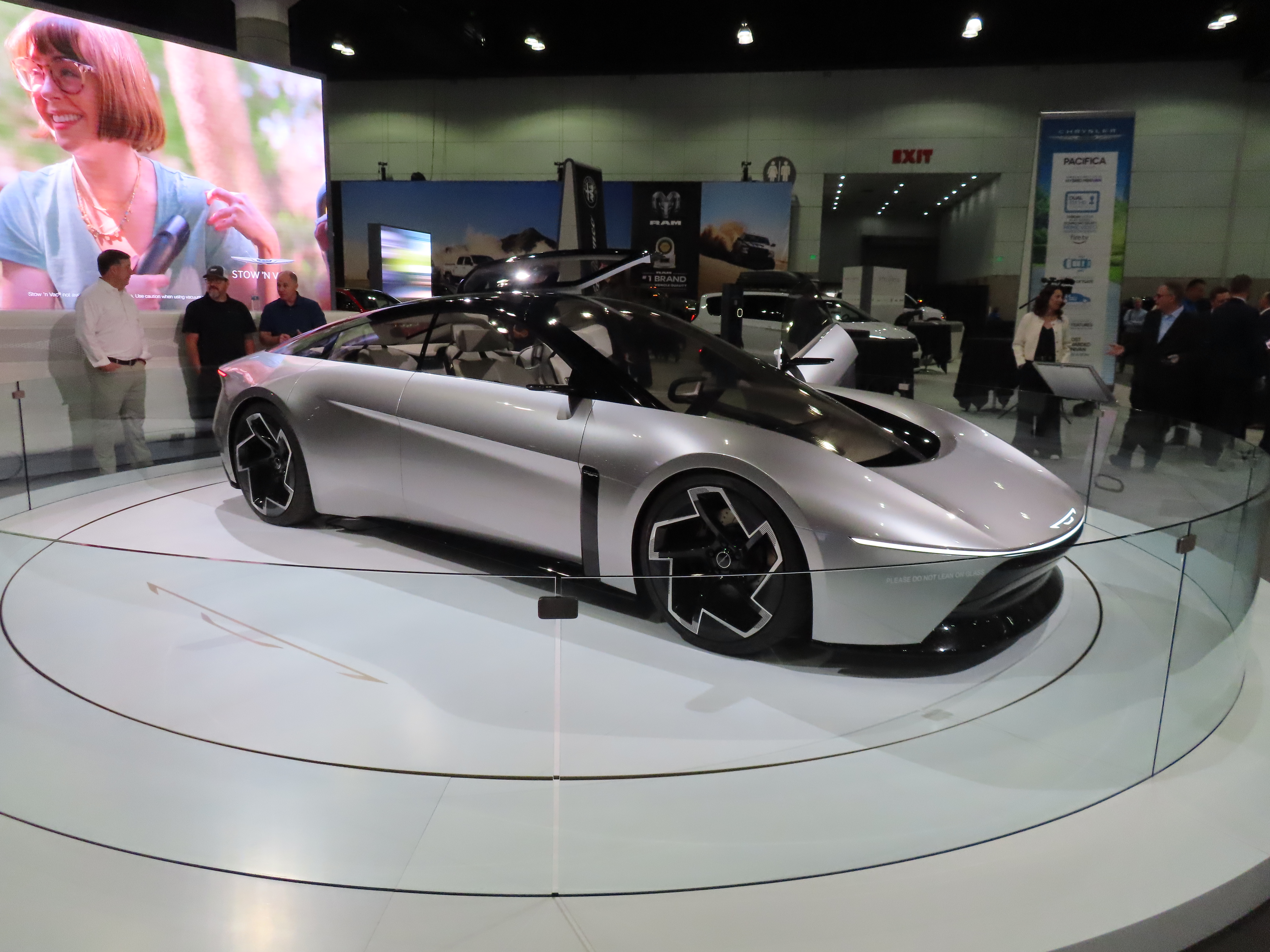
- Chrysler Halcyon Concept.

Overview
- Type: Sedan
- Manufacturer: Chrysler (Stellantis North America)
- Production: 2028 (planned)
- Designer: Jasmine Brown

Body and chassis
- Class: Sports sedan
- Body style: 4 regular doors and 2 butterfly doors.

Powertrain
- Battery: Lithium-sulfur batteries
- Electric range: 500 miles
- Plug-in charging: Dynamic wireless road charging

The Chrysler Halcyon is a concept electric sports sedan developed by the automobile manufacturer Chrysler, which was announced on February 13, 2024, with availability in 2028.

== Specifications ==
The vehicle is powered by an 800-volt lithium-sulfur battery. According to the references, it is estimated that the battery leaves 60% lower carbon footprint in manufacturing than most of other batteries.

The exterior and interior shapes are marked by sharp angles and large sweeping contours. The yoke steering wheel and other vehicle controls integrate with an augmented-reality display appearing on the extra large windshield. A vertical 15.6-inch display screen can serve as a traditional dashboard or be stowed out of view. The vehicle is equipped with an updated version of "Stow N' Go", Chrysler's fold down seat technology that was first introduced in their Town & Country minivans. The four door vehicle includes rear doors that open in the opposite direction of the front seat doors, this allows the front and back doors to meet each other directly eliminating the need for a support between them that would ordinarily serve as a jamb. There are also two butterfly-hinged canopy doors which primarily serve as overhead window, these bridge the front and back doors and fold upward to further facilitate entry of the vehicle.

Chrysler is promoting "Active Aero Technology" as part of the vehicles architecture, a form of active Drag reduction system.

Chrysler announced the vehicles are to be made mostly from recycled items, listing the LED illuminated Chrysler wing logo, the steering wheel, front seat inserts, and door sills are to be made from recycled music CDs. Chrysler's CEO, Christine Feuell, is quoted saying: "All of the design elements being very modern and sleek and aerodynamic, with the use of sustainable materials, with the tune of [Sic] 95% of the interior is sustainable."

== Technology ==
Chrysler is claiming the vehicle is designed to "deliver unlimited range" when used on roadways equipped with "Dynamic Wireless Power Transfer Capability" which is described as a form of Wireless power transfer infrastructure installed beneath roadways which they are claiming is in development.

The vehicle is advertised as capable of full self driving (SAE level 5) using "STLA AutoDrive Level 4 Autonomy" although as of early 2024, no automated driving system from any manufacturer has achieved full SAE level 5 autonomy.
