= Chrysler Fifth Avenue =

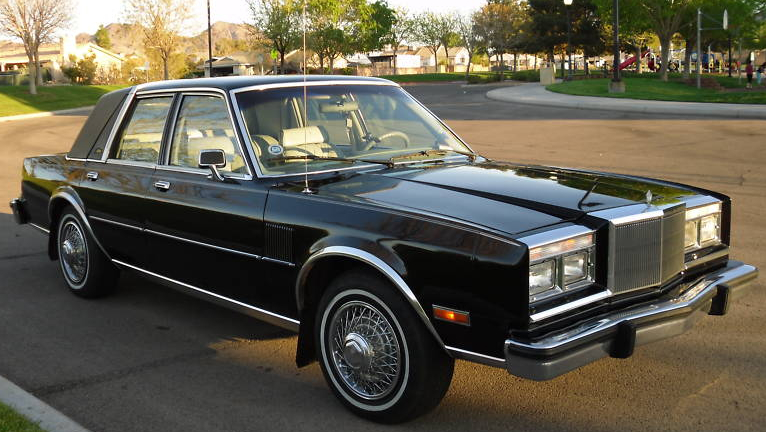
- 1984 Chrysler Fifth Avenue

Overview
- Manufacturer: Chrysler
- Model years: 1982–1993 (as stand-alone model)

Body and chassis
- Class: Full-size (1979–1981); Intermediate (1982–1989); Full-size (1990–1993)
- Body style: 4-door sedan

Chronology
- Predecessor: Chrysler New Yorker Brougham (R-body version); Chrysler LeBaron (M-body version)
- Successor: Chrysler Imperial (for M-body); Chrysler New Yorker/LHS (for Y-body)

Chrysler Fifth Avenue is a nameplate that was used by Chrysler on several of its larger sedans from 1979 to 1993. Serving in reference to the namesake prominent Manhattan street (two blocks west of the Chrysler Building), the nameplate was reserved for the highest-trim Chrysler vehicles (below only the Imperial). Initially offered as an option package and as a limited-edition vehicle, the Fifth Avenue eventually became a stand-alone model line, competing against the Lincoln Town Car and the Cadillac Fleetwood.

As a free-standing model line, the Chrysler Fifth Avenue was produced for two generations. From 1982 to 1989 (under several name changes), it was the Chrysler counterpart of the Dodge Diplomat, making it the final rear-wheel drive Chrysler sedan produced in the 20th century. From 1990 to 1993, the Fifth Avenue was a long-wheelbase version of the Chrysler New Yorker, sharing its body with the Chrysler Imperial.

After 1993, Chrysler retired the Fifth Avenue nameplate, replacing it with the LH platform Chrysler New Yorker and the Chrysler LHS.

== First generation (R platform; 1979-1981) ==
Series TP
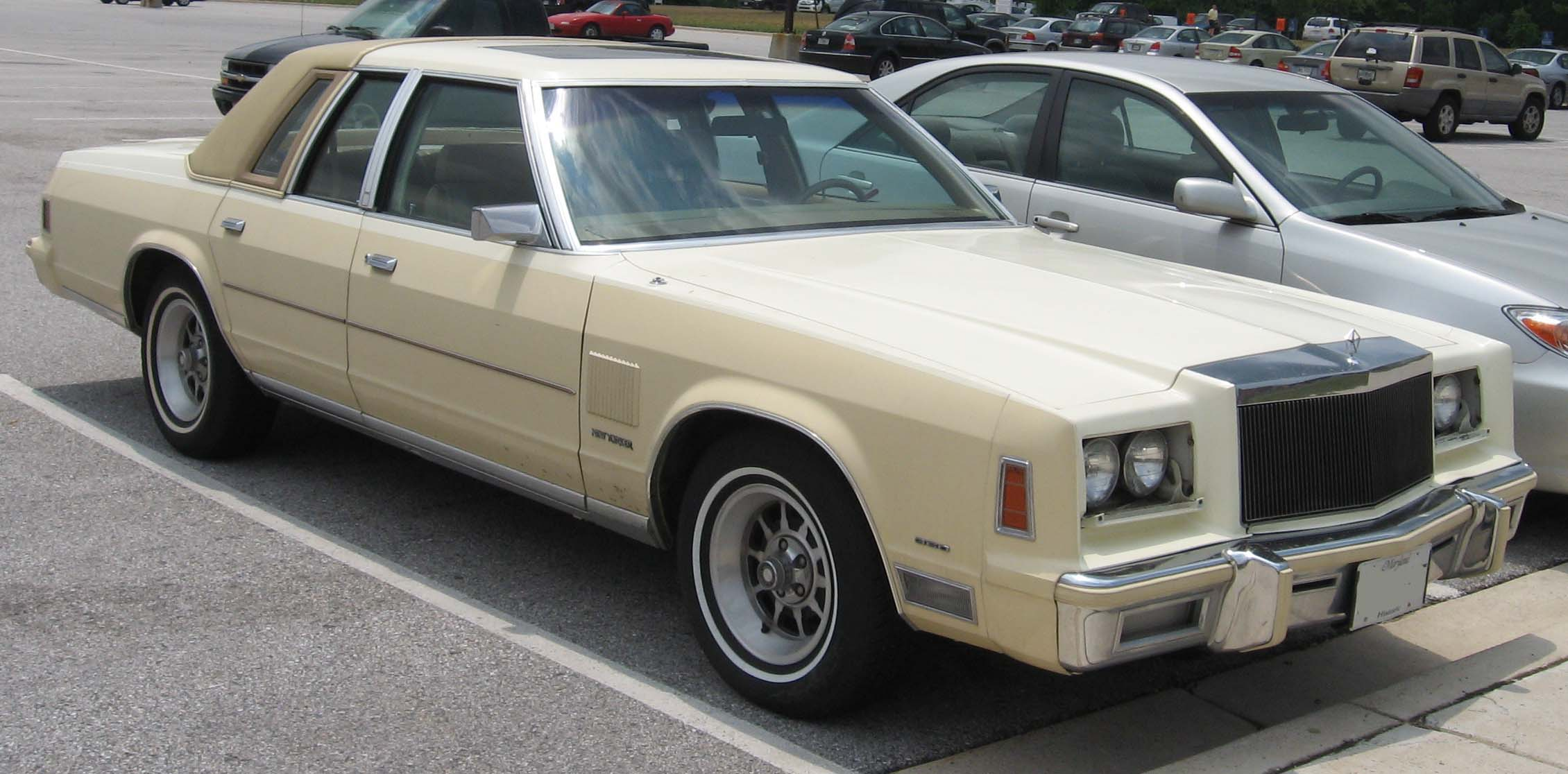
- 1979 Chrysler New Yorker Fifth Avenue

Overview
- Model years: 1979–1981
- Assembly: Lynch Road Assembly, Detroit, Michigan, United States

Body and chassis
- Body style: 4-door sedan
- Layout: FR layout
- Platform: R-body
- Chassis: body-on-frame
- Related: Chrysler New Yorker; Chrysler Newport; Dodge St. Regis; Plymouth Gran Fury

Powertrain
- Engine: 318 cu in (5.2 L) LA V8; 360 cu in (5.9 L) LA V8
- Transmission: 3-speed A727 automatic; 3-speed A904 automatic

Dimensions
- Wheelbase: 118.5 in (3,010 mm)
- Length: 221.5 in (5,626 mm)
- Width: 77.1 in (1,958 mm)
- Height: 54.5 in (1,384 mm)
- Curb weight: 3,810 lb (1,730 kg)

The Fifth Avenue name was first used in 1979, on an upmarket trim-level of the R‑body Chrysler New Yorker sedan. This generation of Chrysler, although already smaller than its maximum size of the previous 1978 Series CS, remained V8-powered and rear wheel drive. The R-body rode on a 118.5-inch (3,010 mm) wheelbase, which was similar to the downsized Cadillac and Lincoln competitors.

For 1979, ordering the New Yorker Fifth Avenue Edition package got the buyer a car finished in only two-tone "Designer's Cream-on-Beige" exterior paint, with matching Champagne leather interior and lighter-toned "driftwood" woodgrain dash appliques and a unique "Pentastar" hood ornament. There was a standard landau vinyl roof, and somewhat unusual fixed quarter windows which were integrated with the rear doors, while the body style was a "pillared hardtop", leaving the doors without metal frames around the windows. Added to the upper door frame surrounding the fixed quarter windows was a courtesy light above a leather door handle while an entry footlight was installed in the lower portion of the door.

The package was so thoroughly color-keyed that even the bumper rub strips were beige. The R-body Fifth Avenues ran for three years, although additional Fifth Avenue colors were added for 1980 and 1981. The concealed headlights were a styling feature that carried over from the discontinued Imperial LeBaron and the Chrysler New Yorker Brougham that briefly replaced the marque. The listed retail price of the New Yorker was $8,631 ($33,726 in 2025 dollars) and the Fifth Avenue trim package added $1,500 extra ($5,861 in 2025 dollars). The front suspension continued to offer Chryslers signature, but antiquated, longitudinal front torsion bars, called Torsion-Aire, and anti-sway bar with a solid rear limited-slip differential connected to leaf springs which was introduced on the 1957 Series C-76.

To add to its exclusivity, Chrysler offered "Convenience and Appearance Options". The list offered Open Road Handling Package, Two-Tone Paint, interior lighting, air conditioning with an upgraded climate control feature, rear window defroster, cruise control, power adjustable front seat, power windows, power electric door locks, power trunk release, luxury appearance steering wheel with an extra cost leather wrapped feature, digital clock, locking gas cap, lighting and mirrors, halogen headlamps, cornering lamps, electric adjustable outside sideview mirrors, several AM/FM radio or separate stereo radio choices to include CB radio and 8-track cassette player, power electric extendable antenna, various vinyl side moldings and bumper guards, undercoating, color keyed seat belts, wheel covers, and aluminum wheels, all at extra cost.

For 1980 a second exterior color was offered called "Black Walnut" metallic, a simulated alligator grained padded landau vinyl roof in matching Black Walnut with gold accent body side stripes while the interior color remained only as Champagne leather interior.

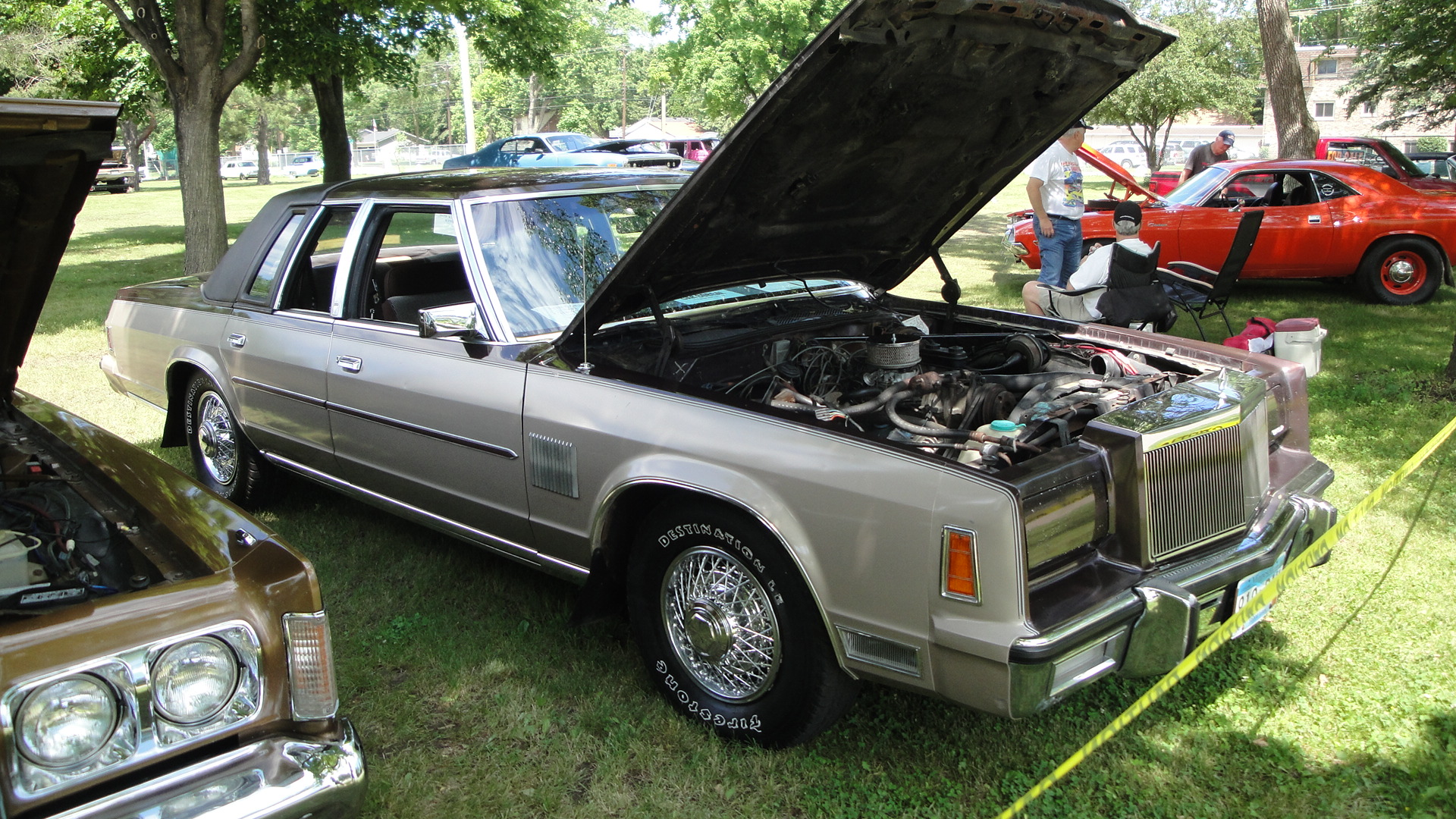
1981 Chrysler New Yorker Fifth Avenue

The 1981 Fifth Avenues added two new exterior colors, while the Fifth Avenue trim package was now $2,092 ($8,175 in 2025 dollars) to the $10,459 retail price ($40,869 in 2025 dollars). The new colors offered "Mahogany Starmist" and "Heather Mist" exterior paint with gold pinstriping with a matching Mahogany Landau roof with the Mahogany interior offering Heather cloth or leather, or "Nightwatch Blue" with "Heather Mist", the same color treatment on the Landau roof, with Dark Blue interior pieces instead of Mahogany. Corduroy cloth upholstery was available in Heather or Cashmere, while the leather added Dark Blue and Mahogany to the Heather and Cashmere color choices with matching dashboard, door panels and carpeting. No coupe was offered and instead Chrysler reintroduced the Imperial nameplate as a coupe only, and the Fifth Avenue shared an appearance with the Series YS Imperial coupe.

The underlying technology, consisting of engine, transmission chassis, suspension and drivetrain was shared with all full-sized R-body vehicles sold as Dodge and Plymouth products, while the exclusivity of the Chrysler name added sound insulation, color selections and more sound system choices. Overall production of the R-body New Yorkers was low (less than 75,000 from 1979 through 1981) and Fifth Avenue production was approximately 25% of them. 14 were stretched into limousines and several were provided for use during the 1980 Winter Olympics in Lake Placid, NY. The others were loaned to Hollywood movie studios. During this time the Early 1980s recession in the United States began to take effect and impact sales.

North American luxury sedans began to experience competition from imported European manufacturers, like the Mercedes-Benz S-Class, BMW 7 Series, and the Jaguar XJ which offered standard equipment like fuel injection and responsive engine performance as well as higher prestige and more modern design. Meanwhile, the Japanese marques introduced the Toyota Cressida and the Nissan Maxima, offering luxurious appearance, high levels of formerly optional equipment as standard, and fuel efficiency as well as markedly better reliability at a modest price.

== ASC LeBaron Fifth Avenue (1980) ==
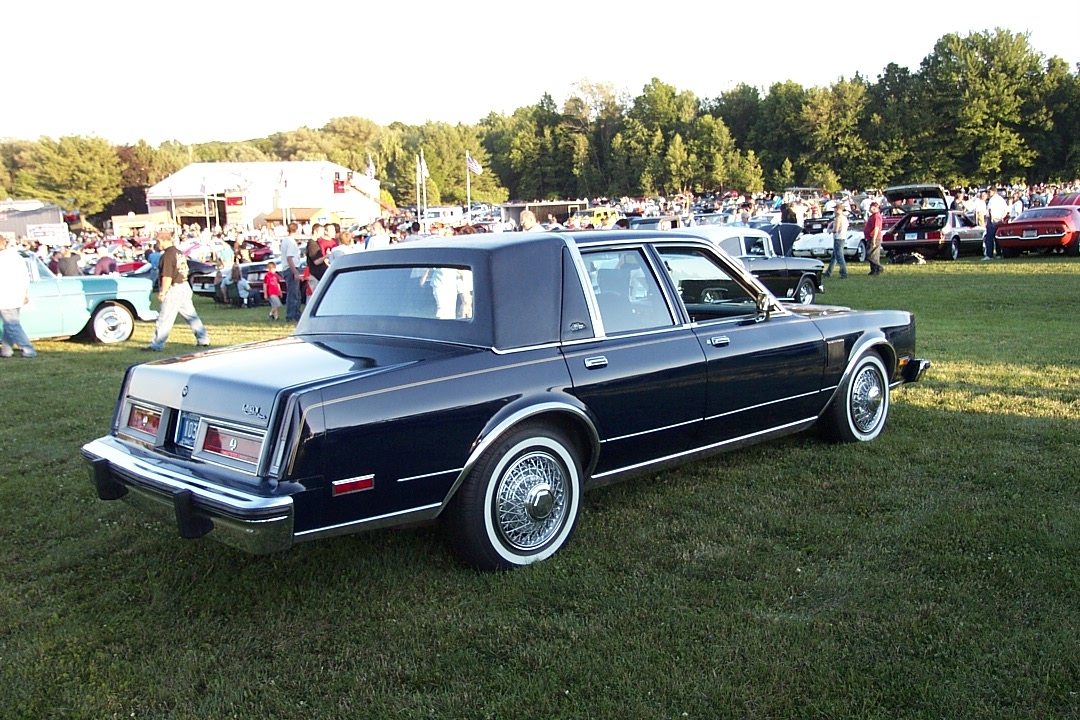
1980 M-body Chrysler LeBaron Fifth Avenue

For 1980 only, a Fifth Avenue package was created by ASC (American Sunroof Corporation) for the Chrysler LeBaron, which shared its Chrysler M platform with the Dodge Diplomat. This rare option package, produced on 654 LeBarons for the year, included many of the exterior features found on the New Yorker Fifth Avenue on a shorter wheelbase.

== Second generation (M platform; 1982-1989) ==
Series MBF
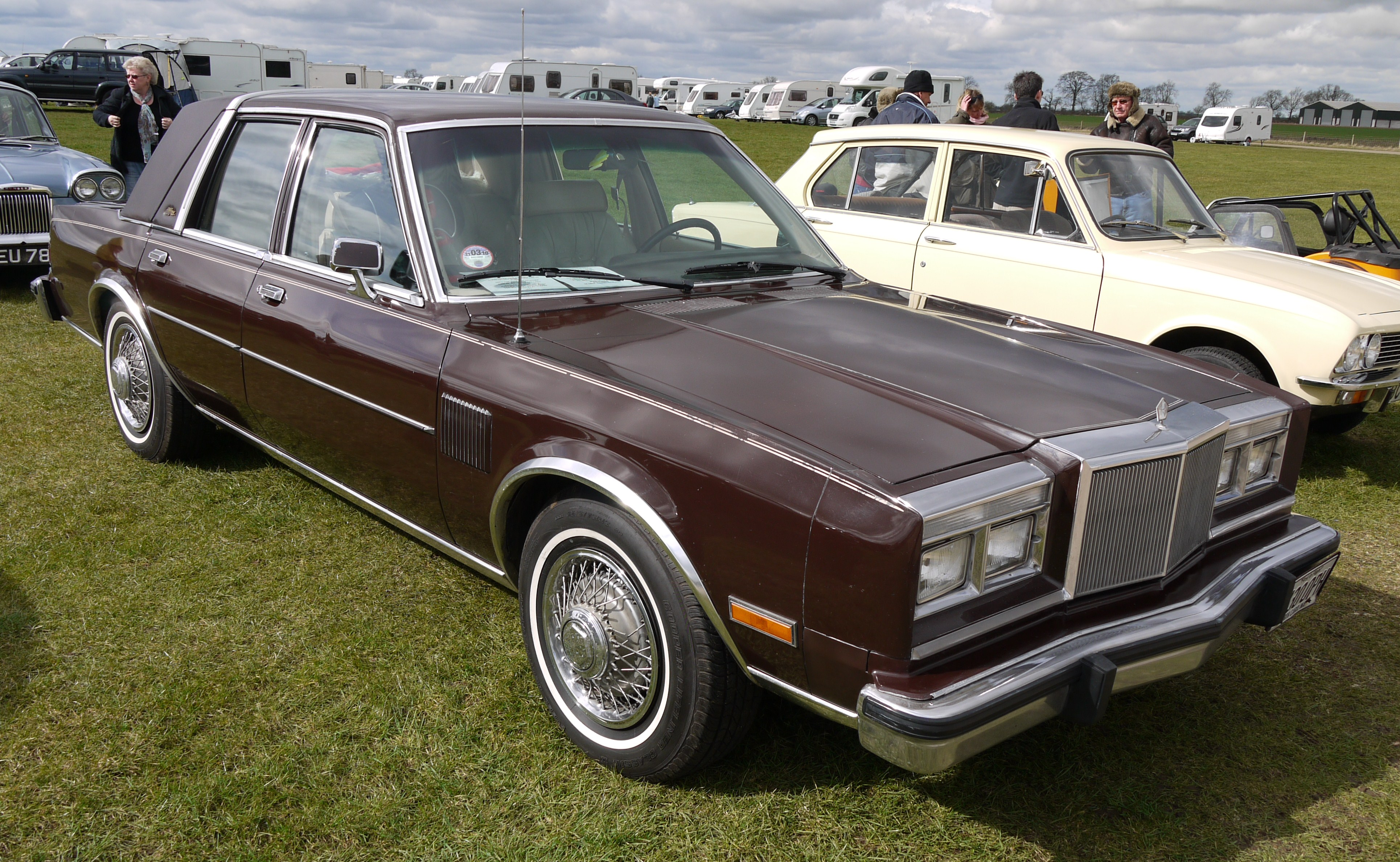
- Chrysler New Yorker Fifth Avenue (M-body)

Overview
- Production: 1982–1989
- Assembly: Windsor Assembly (1982–1983); Saint Louis Assembly (1984–1986); Kenosha Assembly (Mid 1987–December 1988)

Body and chassis
- Layout: FR layout
- Platform: M-body
- Related: Chrysler New Yorker; Dodge Diplomat; Plymouth Gran Fury (American Market Model); Plymouth Caravelle (Canadian Market Model)

Powertrain
- Engine: 225 cu in (3.7 L) Slant I6; 318 cu in (5.2 L) LA V8
- Transmission: 3-speed A727 automatic 3-speed A904 automatic

Dimensions
- Wheelbase: 112.7 in (2,863 mm)
- Length: 206.7 in (5,250 mm)
- Width: 72.4 in (1,839 mm)
- Height: 55.1 in (1,400 mm)
- Curb weight: 3,655 lb (1,658 kg)

Chronology
- Predecessor: Chrysler Newport; Chrysler New Yorker Brougham; Chrysler LeBaron (1977-1981)
- Successor: Chrysler Imperial (1990-1993)

For the 1982 model year, the R-body line was discontinued and the New Yorker nameplate transferred to the smaller M-body line. Up to this point, the Chrysler M-body entry had been sold as LeBaron, but that name was moved to a new K-car based FWD line. Following the nameplate swap, the M-body line was consolidated and simplified. 360 V8 engines were gone, as were coupes and station wagons (the K-car LeBaron's coupe and wagon replaced them).

The Fifth Avenue option was still available as a $1,244 package ($4,150 in 2025 dollars) to the listed retail price of $10,851 ($36,201 in 2025 dollars). It was adapted from the earlier LeBaron's package, with a distinctive vinyl roof, electro-luminescent opera lamps, and a rear fascia adapted from the Dodge Diplomat, albeit modified. Interiors featured button-tufted, pillow-soft seats covered in either "Kimberley velvet" or "Corinthian leather", choices that would continue unchanged throughout the car's run. In addition, the carpet was thicker than that offered in the base New Yorker, Diplomat and Gran Fury/Caravelle Salon, and the interior had more chrome trim. The Fifth Avenue option also included illuminated entry, AM/FM stereo with a rear amplifier, power door locks, power 6-way driver's seat, power antenna, remote trunk release, dual side mirrors, full undercoating, passenger vanity mirror, tape stripes, locking wire wheel covers, as well as a standard 5.2-litre (318 cu in), V8 engine.

The colors offered were expanded from the previous generations' exclusivity, offering Goldenrod Crystal Coat, Nightwatch Blue, Charcoal Gray metallic, Formal Black, Morocco Red, Sterling Silver Crystal, Mahogany metallic, and Pearl White.

1982 was the last year for the optional AM/FM 8-track stereo, and AM/FM stereo with integrated CB. The exterior of a Fifth Avenue Edition New Yorker can be identified from a regular New Yorker by the following: opera lights, hood stripes, and Fifth Avenue Edition badges on the rear door window filler panels—New Yorkers bore "New Yorker" badges.

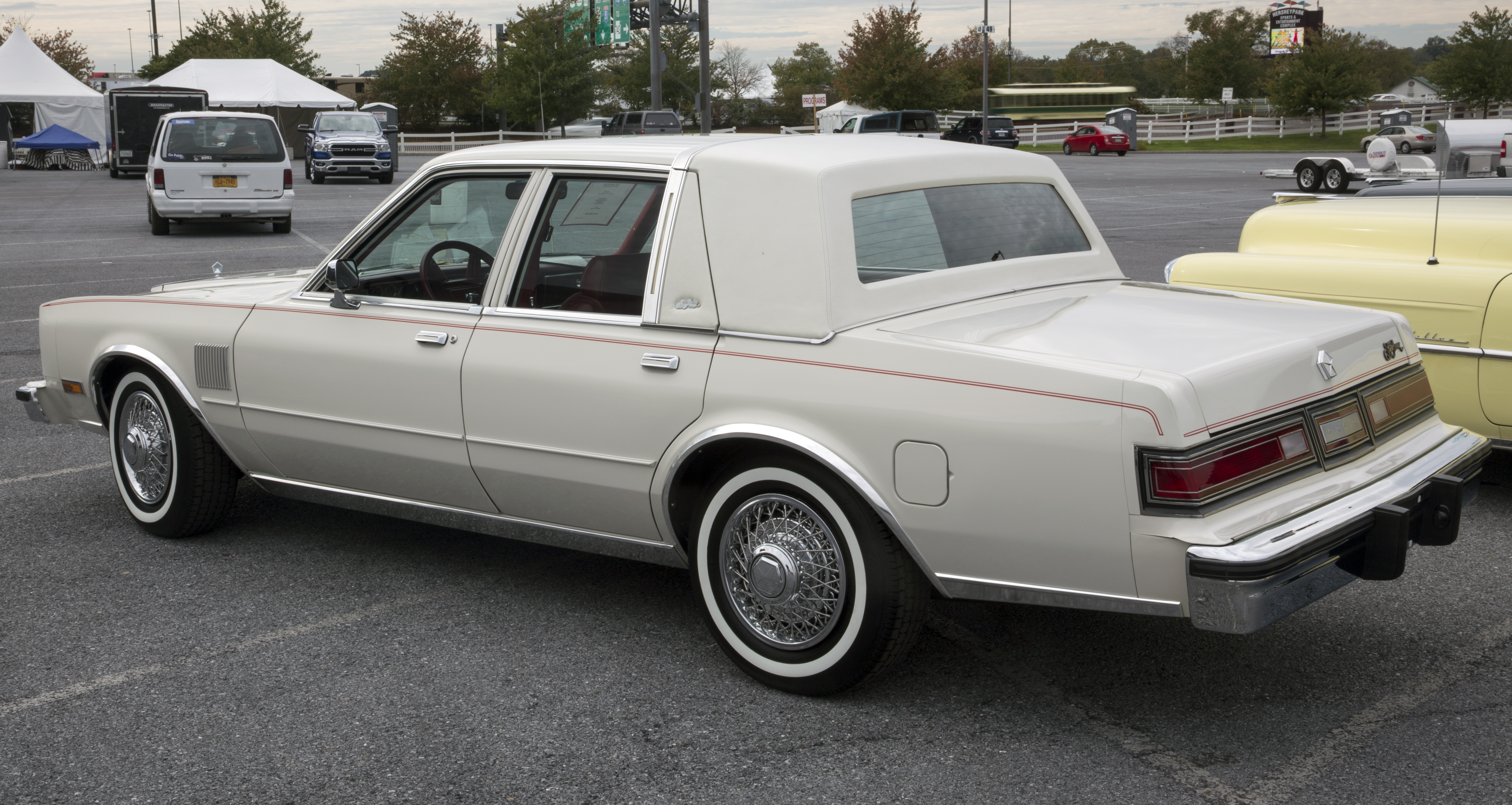
1985 Chrysler Fifth Avenue, rear view

In another confusing name swap, the New Yorker name was now used for another new extended K-car line in 1983, the E-body New Yorker. The larger M-body car was now called New Yorker Fifth Avenue to distinguish it from the E-body. 1983 was the last year M-bodies were made in Canada and the last year for the optional "Chronometer" glovebox-mounted clock, the 225 Slant-six six-cylinder engine, and all analog tuned radios and chrome-trimmed pedals.

For 1984, the car was simply called Fifth Avenue, setting the name that would continue for six successful years. The Fifth Avenue (and its Dodge and Plymouth siblings) would prove to be the last V8-powered, rear wheel drive Chrysler vehicles until the Chrysler 300 was revived in that configuration for 2005.

All Fifth Avenues from 1984 to 1989 were powered by a 318 cu in (5.2 L) V8 engine, mated to Chrysler's well-known Torqueflite three-speed automatic transmission. Front suspension featured transverse torsion bars with anti-sway bars. As this was the largest Chrysler model available, sales took off, especially during 1985–1986, when over 100,000 were made each year.

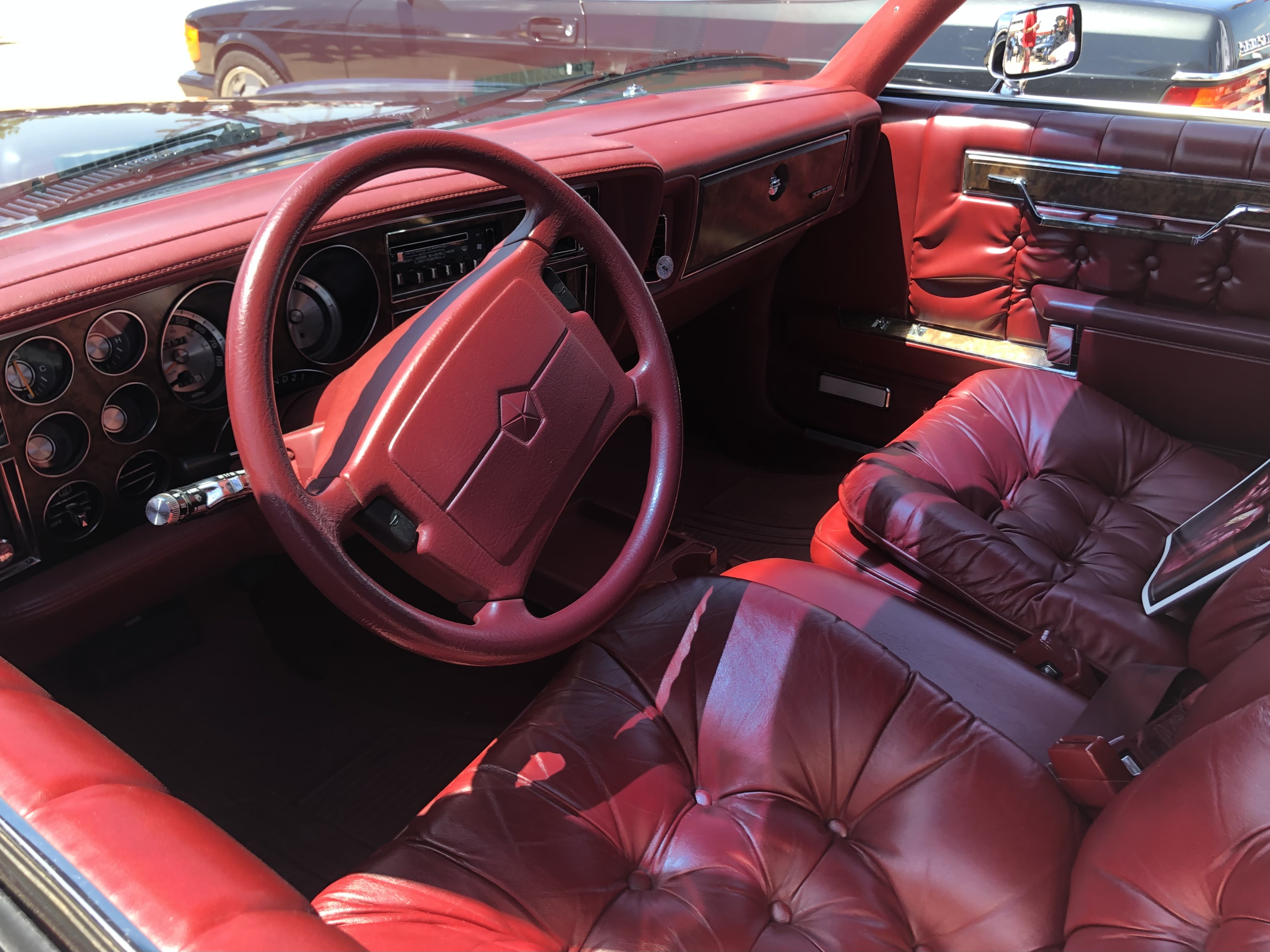
M-Body Fifth Avenue "Corinthian Leather" interior

Starting with the 1984 models, Fifth Avenue production was moved from Windsor, Ontario to St. Louis, Missouri. Beginning in mid-1987 through mid 1989 model year, they were manufactured at the American Motors plant in Kenosha, Wisconsin which had been purchased by Chrysler in 1987.

The Fifth Avenue also far outsold its Dodge Diplomat and Plymouth Gran Fury siblings, with a much greater proportion of sales going to private customers, despite its higher price tag. Production peaked at 118,000 cars for 1986 and the Fifth Avenue stood out in a by-now K-car dominated lineup as Chrysler's lone concession to traditional RWD American sedans.

Some of the changes to the M-body Fifth Avenue through the years included:

- 1984 - New Yorker badge replaced by Fifth Avenue badge on trunklid; "Fifth Avenue Edition" badge continues on the rear doors, a new steering wheel was added. The regular Pentastar was replaced by a crystal one and was now used on the hood ornament and steering wheel (this would continue through 1989). Wiper arms were now black (instead of silver). Engine blocks were also now painted black (previous ones were painted light blue) Optional 10-spoke alloy "Road Wheels" were replaced with new optional "Snowflake" alloy wheels. New upholstery, and new exterior colors (most in base/clear) appeared.
- 1985 - New black gearshift knob introduced (1982 to 1984 models have chromed knobs). Turn signal lever is now also black (1984 and below models were interior color keyed) with the exception of models with two-tone paint. A revised 5.2 L V8 now had a roller camshaft, swirl-port heads, and a carburetor changed from a two-barrel Carter to a two-barrel Holley. This increased horsepower from 130 to 140 and torque was also increased to 265 lb-ft (from 230). California models now also came with the Holley 6280 2bbl carb.
- 1986 - New-style ignition key and center high-mounted stop lamp (the latter a federal mandate) introduced. Models with two-tone paint had lower roof lines.
- 1987 - New steering wheel; final year for optional alloy wheels, two-tone paint, and rear stereo amplifier were offered. Also the last year for 17-ounce deep-pile carpeting and the last year the radio, headlight switch and climate control panels were silver.
- 1988 - Vinyl roof restyled; lower edge of sail panel covering extended below chrome window sill moldings. "Fifth Avenue Edition" badge replaced by a crystal Pentastar surrounded by a gold wreath which in 1990 would reappear on the Imperial. Driver's side seat now had a manual recliner (previous models had 6-way power adjusters, but no recliner). Front headrests were more cushioned. The piping around the seats was now stitched material rather than the plastic in previous years. New radios. Door panels are restyled and new power mirrors are standard. Passenger side dash vents were now interior color-keyed (instead of black with chrome trim). A new overhead console with map lamps, compass/temperature display and sunglasses storage became available. A driver SRS with padded knee bolster affixed below the instrument panel became optional in May.
- 1989 - Final year of production. Driver's side airbag is standard. At the time the Fifth Avenue (as well as its M body twins) was one of the only cars that offered an airbag with a tilt steering wheel. Many optional features were made standard.

During the years 1982 to 1988, approximately 60 of these cars were stretched into limousines by various coach companies.

=== Production Figures/Base Prices ===
Production figures for Fifth Avenue were as follows:

1982 - 50,509
1983 - 83,501
1984 - 79,441
1985 - 109,971
1986 - 104,744
1987 - 70,579
1988 - 43,486
1989 - 26,883

Total: 569,114

== Third generation (Y platform; 1990-1993) ==
Series Y
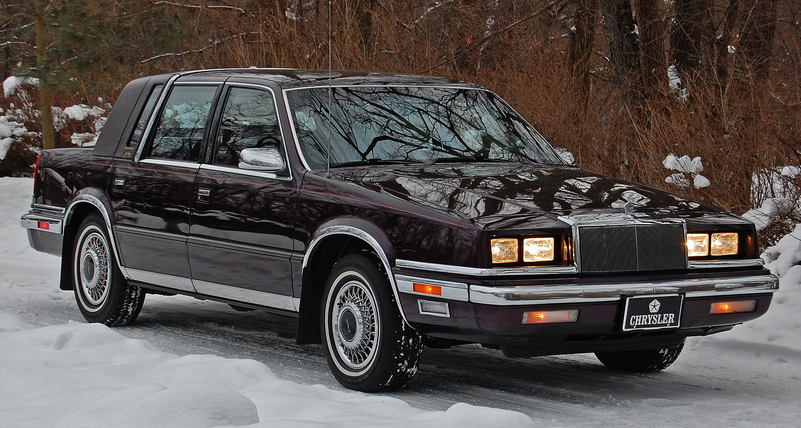
- 1991 Chrysler New Yorker Fifth Avenue (concealed headlamps shown)

Overview
- Production: 1989–1993
- Model years: 1990–1993
- Assembly: Belvidere Assembly Plant (Belvidere, Illinois)

Body and chassis
- Layout: FF layout
- Platform: Chrysler Y platform
- Related: Chrysler Imperial; Chrysler New Yorker Landau

Powertrain
- Engine: 3.3 L EGA V6; 3.8 L EGH V6
- Transmission: 4-speed A604 automatic

Dimensions
- Wheelbase: 109.6 in (2,784 mm)
- Length: 198.6 in (5,044 mm) (1990–91); 201.3 in (5,113 mm) (1992–93)
- Width: 68.9 in (1,750 mm)
- Height: 55.1 in (1,400 mm)
- Curb weight: 3,363 lb (1,525 kg)

Chronology
- Successor: Chrysler New Yorker (LH); Chrysler LHS

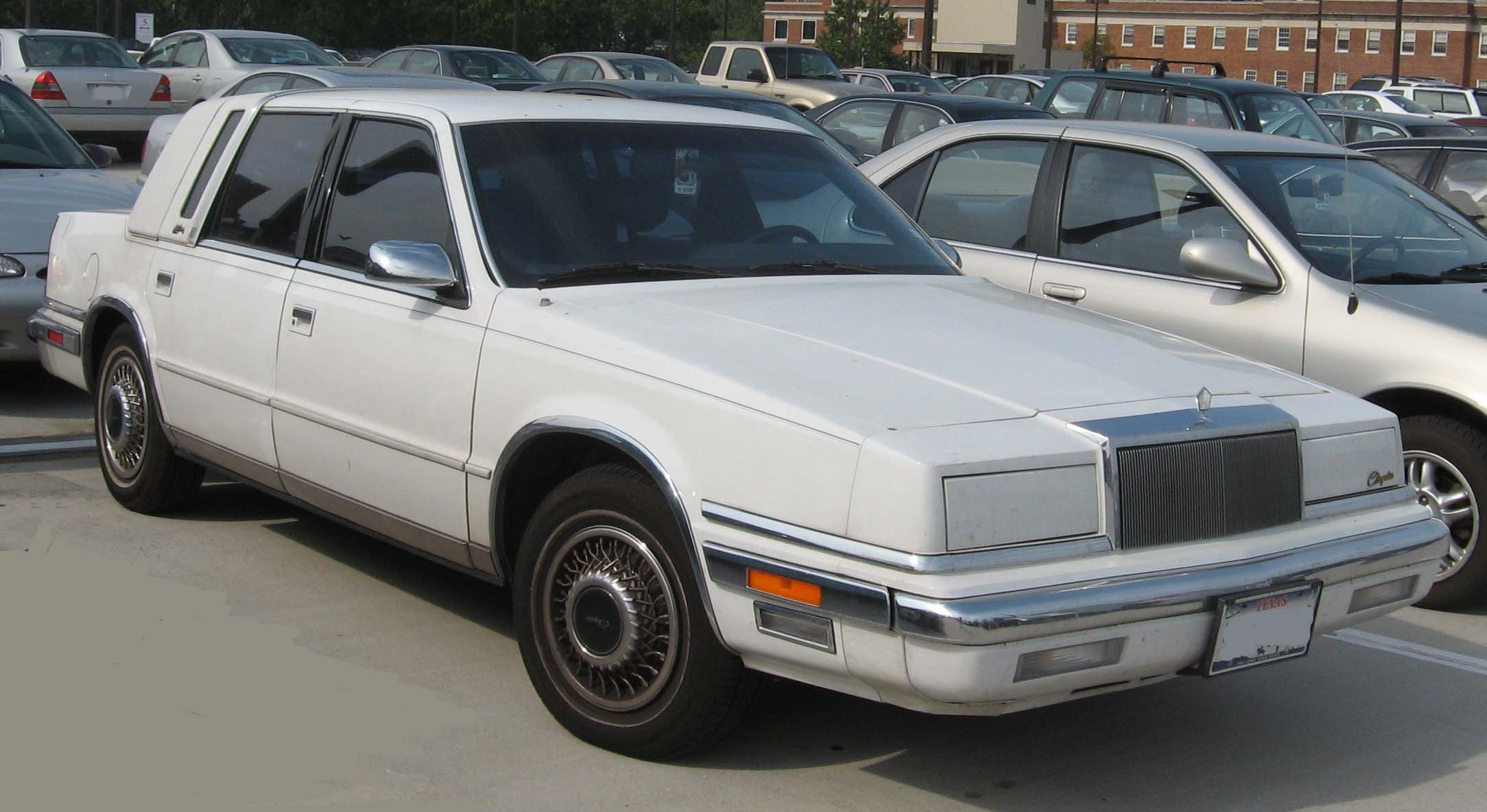
1990-1991 Chrysler New Yorker Fifth Avenue

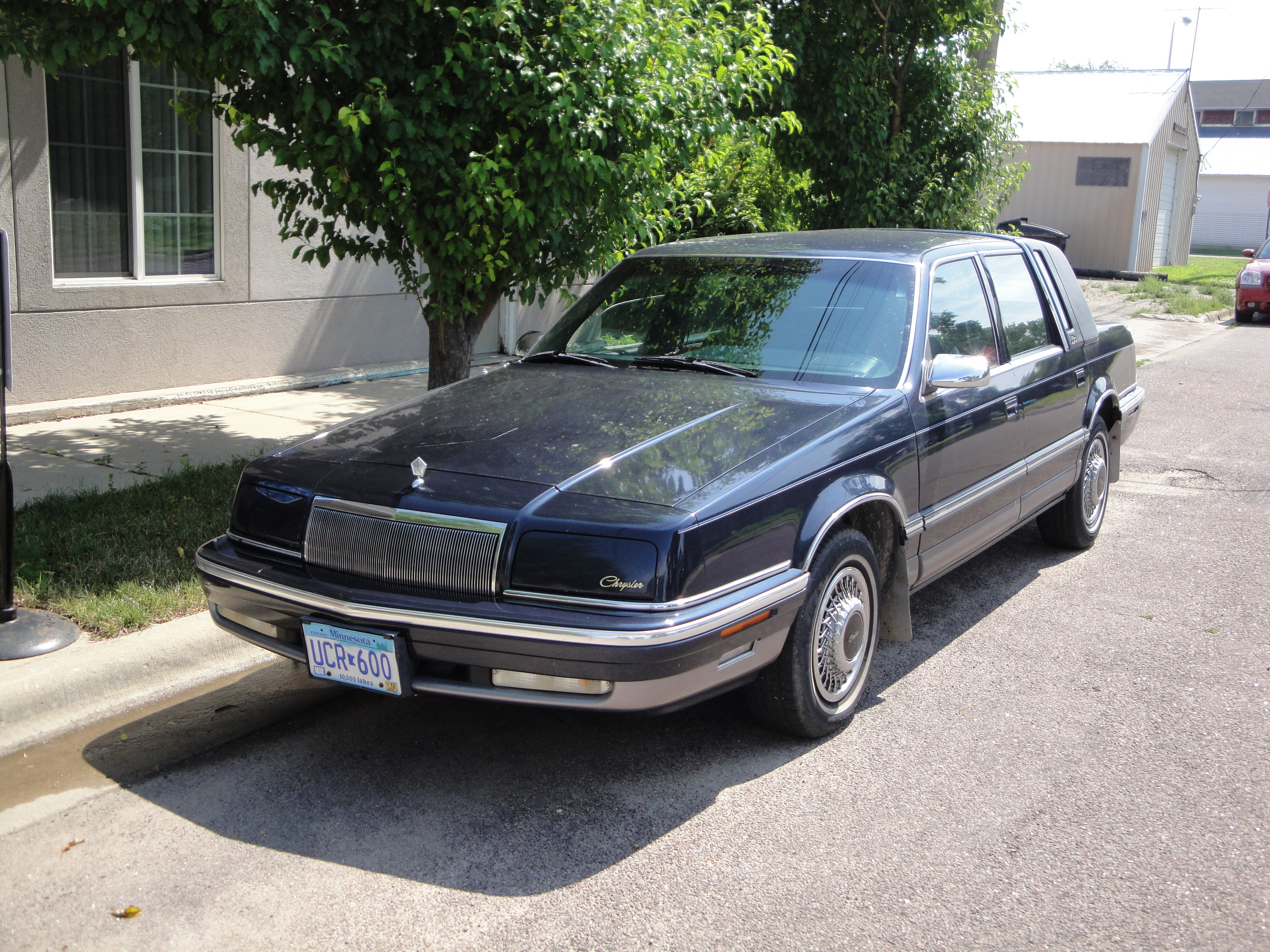
1993 Chrysler New Yorker Fifth Avenue

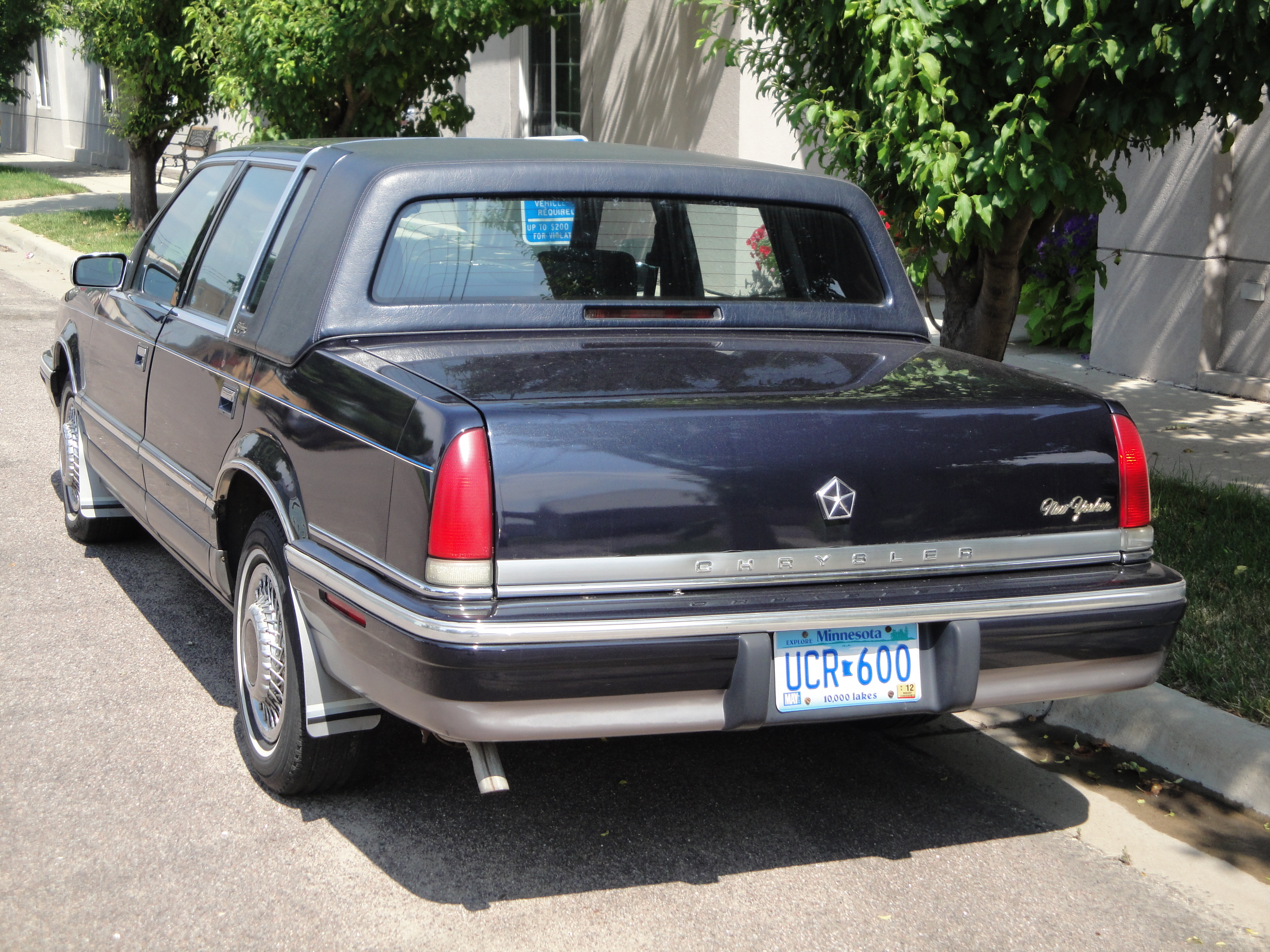
1993 Chrysler New Yorker Fifth Avenue, rear view

For 1990, Chrysler released a third generation of the Fifth Avenue. Again taking on the New Yorker name, the Fifth Avenue now shared its Y platform chassis with the Chrysler Imperial (also released for 1990). The first version of the model line to adopt front-wheel drive, the Fifth Avenue/Imperial were long-wheelbase versions of the C platform Dodge Dynasty and Chrysler New Yorker (introduced for 1988), with a five-inch wheelbase extension to the rear passenger compartment.

Sharing its front and rear bodywork with the smaller New Yorker, the Fifth Avenue was fitted with a standard rear vinyl roof; along with its vertical taillamps (shared with the New Yorker), the Fifth Avenue was distinguished from the Imperial primarily in its vinyl roof covering the C-pillars rearward (as opposed to aft of the B-pillars). To visually shorten the appearance of the longer rear bodywork, the vinyl roof extended onto the rear doors (giving the appearance of a fixed rear quarter window). Though nearly 8 inches shorter than its 1989 namesake (and nearly a foot narrower than several American competitors), the change to front-wheel drive and the longer wheelbase over the C platform chassis brought enough of an increase in interior volume for the 1990 Fifth Avenue to officially be classified as a full-size car (along with its Imperial counterpart, becoming the first full-size Chryslers since 1981).

The Fifth Avenue was further distinguished from the Imperial by the design of its interior; to adopt a more traditional appearance, the Fifth Avenue shared its dashboard and door panels with the New Yorker Landau. The button-tufted seats made their return with the choice of either velour or leather upholstery; the former "Corinthian leather" was replaced by that of the Mark Cross Company (which included an emblem on the seats and on the brushed aluminum band wrapping the roof).

For its 1990 launch, the Fifth Avenue was fitted a 3.3L V6 engine (also standard with the Imperial), paired with the 4-speed Ultradrive automatic transmission. For 1991, a 3.8L V6 became offered as an option; though producing the same 147 hp output as the smaller V6, the 3.8L engine offered additional torque.

=== 1992 update ===
For 1992, Chrysler restyled the body of all New Yorkers, with (slightly) more aerodynamic styling, rounding off the fender lines, grille, and bumpers, and redesigning the taillamps (concealed headlamps remained). The interior saw several functional changes, as floor storage console was added to the dashboard, along with a redesign of the overhead console (still home to the optional trip computer). Serving as a replacement for the previous dashboard-mounted single-disc design, the Fifth Avenue became available with an optional trunk-mounted 6-disc compact disc changer.

1993 saw few changes to the Fifth Avenue, as Chrysler had introduced the LH platform Chrysler Concorde as the successor to the New Yorker Salon, shifting away from traditional designs for luxury-brand sedans. Sharing only its chassis underpinnings with the 1981 K platform, the Y platform Fifth Avenue and Imperial marked the zenith of both its design and its growth (becoming longer in exterior length than the Chrysler minivans).

Following the 1993 model year, Chrysler retired the Y platform and both the Fifth Avenue and Imperial nameplates. For 1994, Chrysler introduced two additional LH platform sedans, both exclusive to the Chrysler division. Slotted above the Chrysler Concorde, Chrysler released the Chrysler New Yorker and Chrysler LHS. Though sharing the same wheelbase as the Concorde and the Dodge Intrepid/Eagle Vision, the New Yorker/LHS were styled with a more upright rear roofline (though far sleeker than the Imperial), creating additional rear seat room. While nearly identical in appearance with the LHS, the LH platform New Yorker took on a similar role as the 1990-1993 Fifth Avenue, featuring a chrome-trimmed grille (though minimally elsewhere), and a front bench seat; the LHS was styled with a body-color grille, five-passenger seating with a console-mounted shifter, and standard alloy wheels (optional on the New Yorker). For 1996, the New Yorker nameplate was retired after 56 years, with the car integrated into the LHS line.
