= Plymouth Satellite =

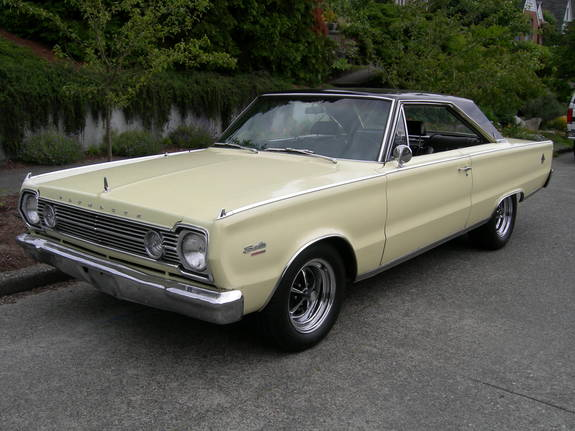
- 1966 Plymouth Satellite 2-door hardtop

Overview
- Manufacturer: Plymouth (Chrysler)
- Production: 1964–1974
- Model years: 1965–1974
- Assembly: United States: Highland Park, Michigan (Lynch Road Assembly); United States: Fenton, Missouri (Saint Louis Assembly)

Body and chassis
- Class: Mid-size
- Layout: FR layout
- Platform: B-body

Chronology
- Predecessor: Plymouth Belvedere
- Successor: Plymouth Fury (seventh generation)

The Plymouth Satellite is a mid-size automobile introduced in the 1965 model year as the top trim model in Plymouth's "B" platform Belvedere line. Available initially in two-door hardtop and convertible models, the Satellite remained the top-of-the-line model until the 1967 model year. A station wagon version was added and a higher "Sport" trim introduced.

The Fury name was moved to Plymouth's mid-size models for 1975, at which time the Satellite name was discontinued.

== First generation (1965–1967) ==
First generation
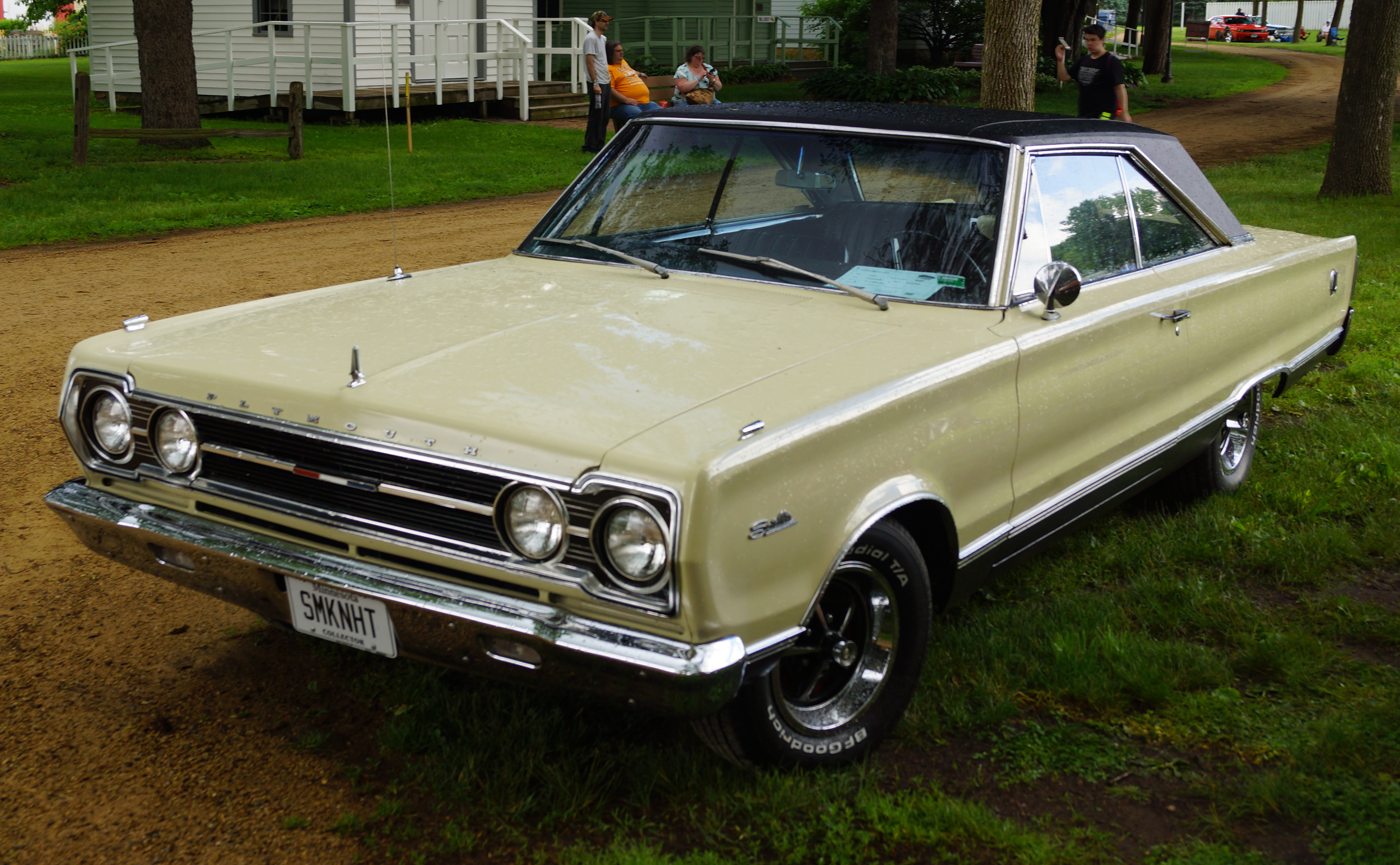
- 1967 Plymouth Satellite 2-door hardtop

Overview
- Production: 1964–1967
- Model years: 1965–1967

Body and chassis
- Body style: 2-door convertible; 2-door hardtop
- Related: Dodge Charger; Dodge Coronet; Plymouth Belvedere; Plymouth GTX (1967 only)

Powertrain
- Engine: 273 cu in (4.5 L) V8; 361 cu in (5.9 L) V8; 318 cu in (5.2 L) LA V8; 383 cu in (6.3 L) Commando V8; 426 cu in (7.0 L) Commando V8 (1965 only); 426 cu in (7.0 L) Super Commando V8 (1965 only); 426 cu in (7.0 L) Hemi V8 (introduced 1966); 440 cu in (7.2 L) Magnum V8 (introduced 1967)
- Transmission: 3-speed manual; 4-speed manual; 3-speed automatic

When the new Chrysler B Body platform was introduced in 1962 the Plymouth Belvedere name was moved from the full sized line to Plymouth's "new" mid-size line. Starting in 1965 the model line was split into the Belvedere I, Belvedere II, and the Belvedere Satellite which became the top trim model in the series, above the Belvedere I and II. It was available in two-door hardtop or convertible versions. Bucket seats and a center console were standard equipment, as well as a V8 engine. For 1965, the standard engine was the 273 cu in (4.5 L) with optional 318 cu in (5.2 L), 361 cu in (5.9 L), as well as 383 cu in (6.3 L) and 426 cu in (7.0 L) "Commando" engines. This 426 had the wedge combustion chamber design and is not the 426 "Hemi" that was offered in 1966. The front end featured single headlights on each side, and a grille divided into four thin rectangles laid horizontally.

The 1965 Satellite two-door hardtop total production was 23,341 units. It weighed 3,220 lb (1,460 kg) with a base price of $2,612 ($26,685 in 2025 dollars). Convertible production was 1,860 units. It weighed 3,325 lb (1,508 kg) and was priced at $2,827 in standard trim ($28,882 in 2025 dollars).

The 1966 redesigned Satellite was available with a "Street Hemi" engine with two 4-barrel carburetors and 10.25:1 compression. This engine was rated at 425 hp (317 kW) at 5,000 rpm and 490 lb⋅ft (664 N⋅m) of torque at 4,000 rpm. The other V8 engine options for 1966 remained the 180 hp (130 kW) 273, the 318 at 230 hp (170 kW), as well as the 265 hp (198 kW) Commando 361 and Commando 383 at 325 hp (242 kW), down from its 330 hp (246 kW) rating in 1965.

The 1967 Satellite was a carryover from 1966, but there were several trim changes. A new grille featured dual side-by-side headlights, a change in the rear trunk finish panel and taillights included multiple horizontal ribs. New horizontal aluminum trim at the lower body crease with lower silver paint gave all 1967 Satellites essentially a two-tone paint scheme. For 1966 and 1967, the interior vinyl seats and door panels were treated to a unique 'Western Scroll' design which mimicked tooled leather in appearance. This was the 'premium' interior shared with the GTX in 1967. For 1966 and 1967 the Satellite was again offered only in 2-door hardtop and convertible body styles and was powered by V8 engines. The 361 was discontinued for the 1967 models, but a 2-barrel 383 producing 270 hp (200 kW) was optional, as well as 4-barrel version rated at 325 hp (242 kW).

Production figures for 1966 were 35,399 hardtops and 2,759 convertibles.

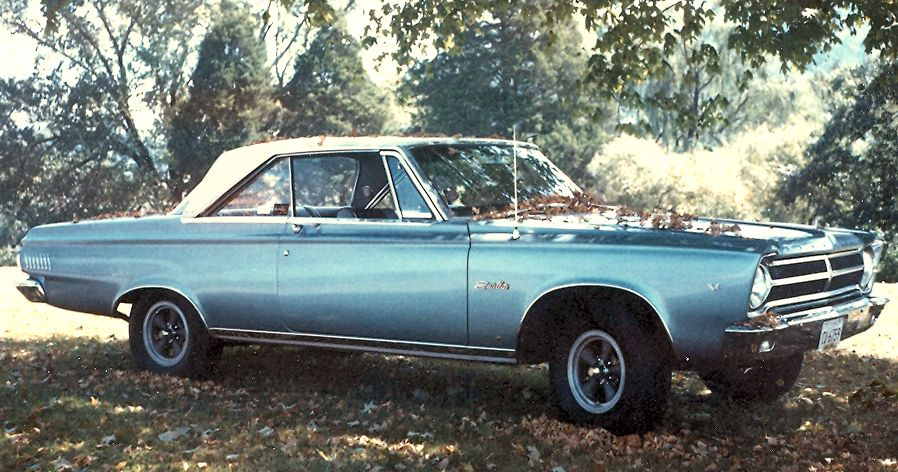
1965 Plymouth Satellite

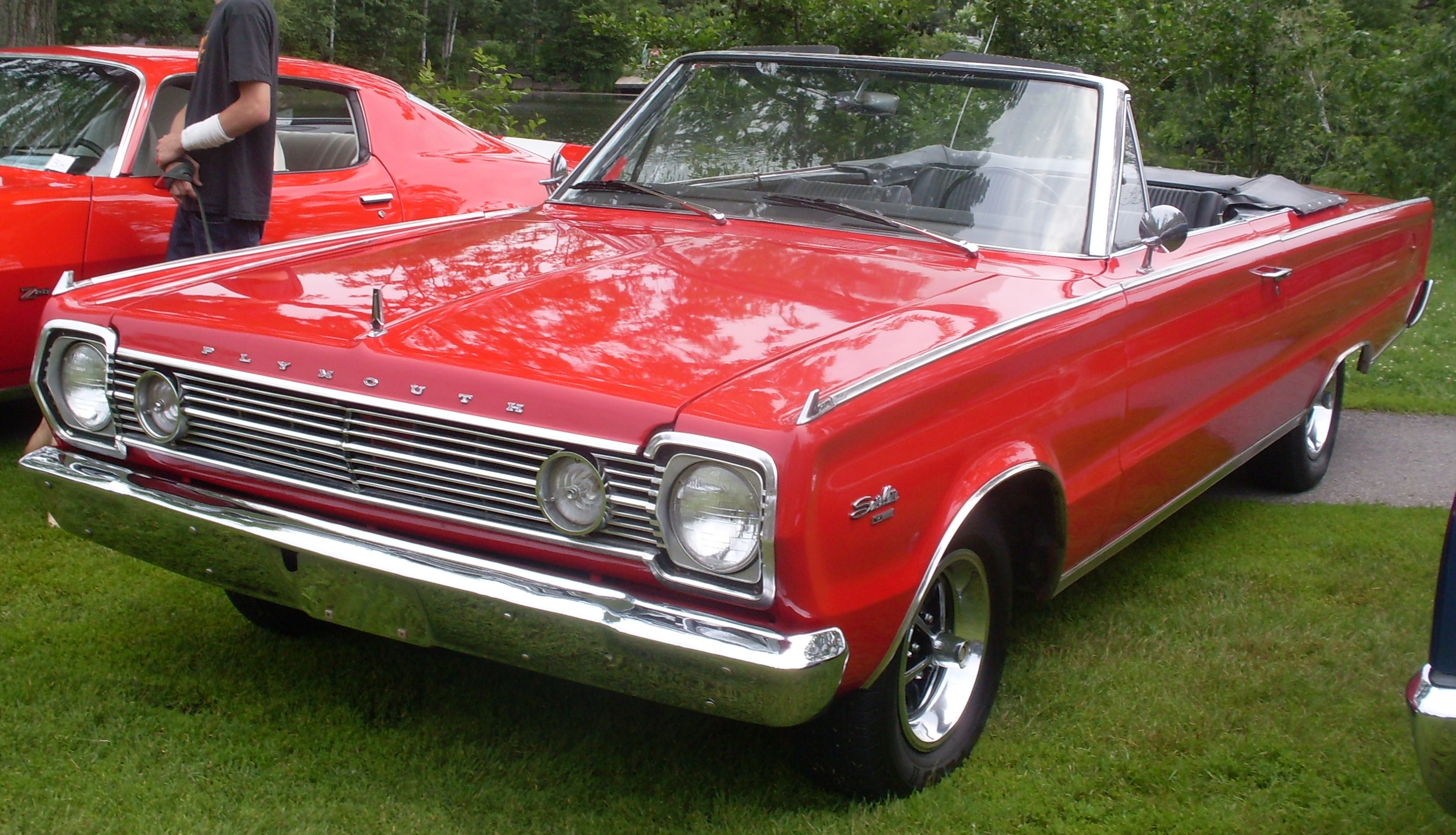
1966 Plymouth Satellite Convertible

== Second generation (1968–1970) ==
Second generation
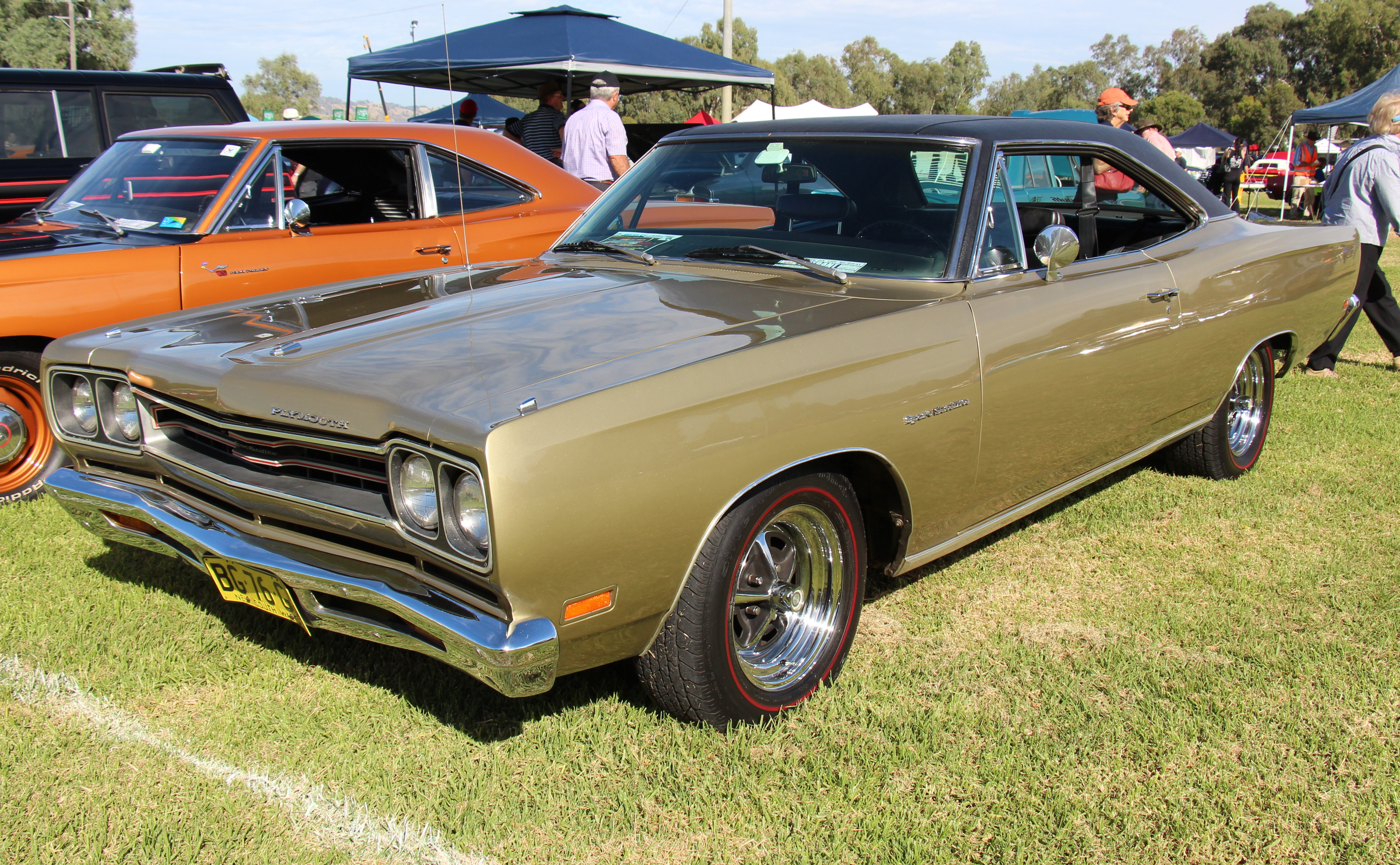
- 1969 Plymouth Satellite hardtop

Overview
- Production: 1967–1970
- Model years: 1968–1970

Body and chassis
- Body style: 2-door convertible; 2-door hardtop; 4-door sedan; 4-door station wagon
- Related: Dodge Charger; Dodge Coronet; Plymouth Belvedere; Plymouth Road Runner; Plymouth GTX

Powertrain
- Engine: 273 cu in (4.5 L) V8; 361 cu in (5.9 L) V8; 318 cu in (5.2 L) V8; 383 cu in (6.3 L) V8; 426 cu in (7.0 L) V8; 440 cu in (7.2 L) V8
- Transmission: 3-speed manual; 4-speed manual; 3-speed automatic

A restyled and higher trimmed Sport Satellite model with a standard 318 V8 was introduced in 1968, sitting above the regular Satellites. The Sport Satellite received the same blacked-out grille with horizontal blades as used on the Road Runner whereas the regular Satellite shared its grille with Belvederes. A 4-door sedan and station wagon were offered on the Satellite line for the first time. There were no Sport Satellite sedans in 1968, but a Satellite Sport Wagon was available. These had Sport Satellite trim and simulated woodgrain body side trim. A Sport Satellite four-door sedan was added to the lineup in 1969, and the wagons became a part of the regular Sport Satellite line.

The 1968 model year was also the introduction of the Plymouth Road Runner that shared the same body as the Satellite and Belvedere models.

The 1968 body continued through 1970, with new grilles in 1969 and a minor front and rear restyling for 1970, which was the last year for the Belvedere name.

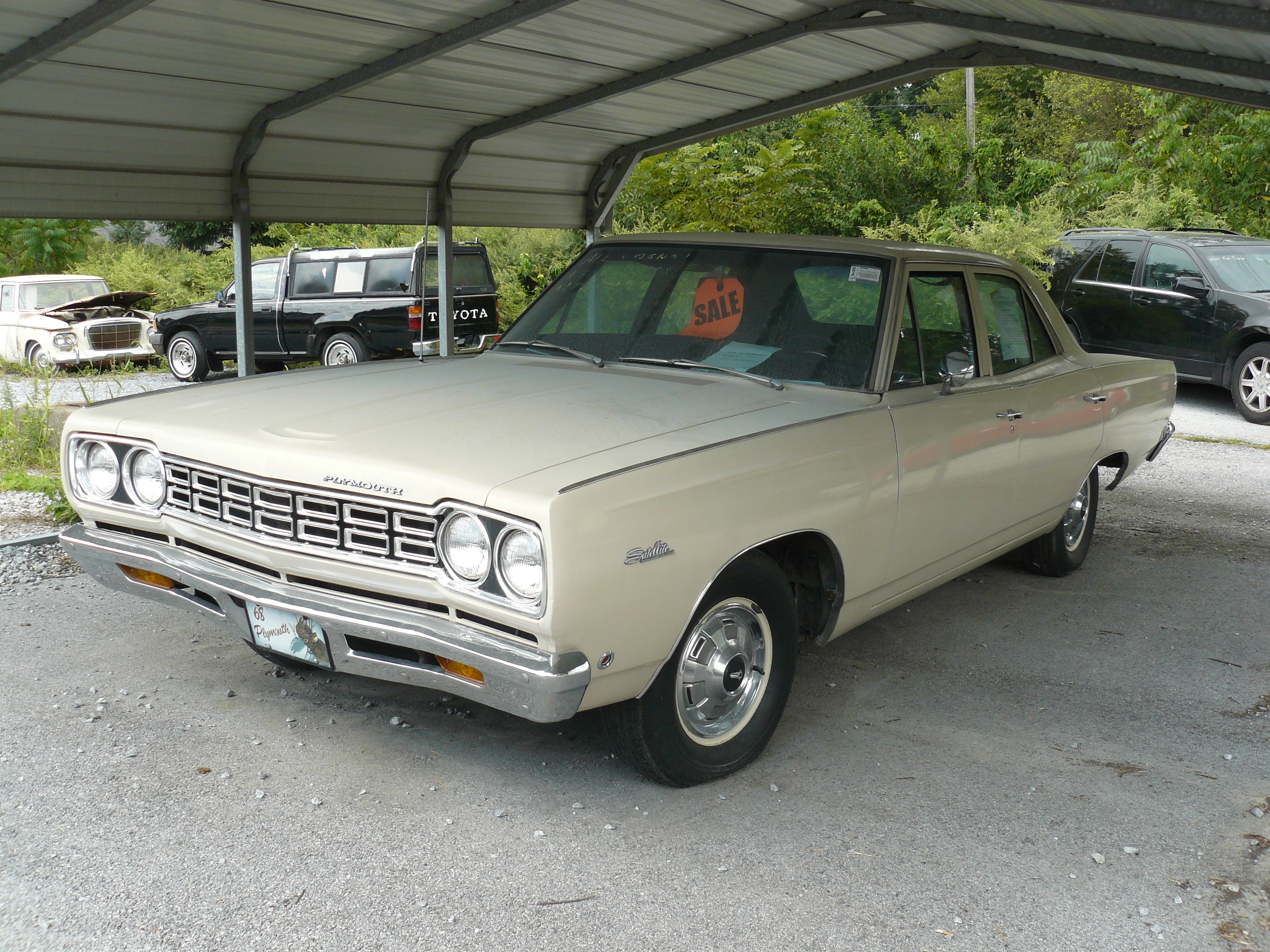
1968 Plymouth Satellite 4-door sedan

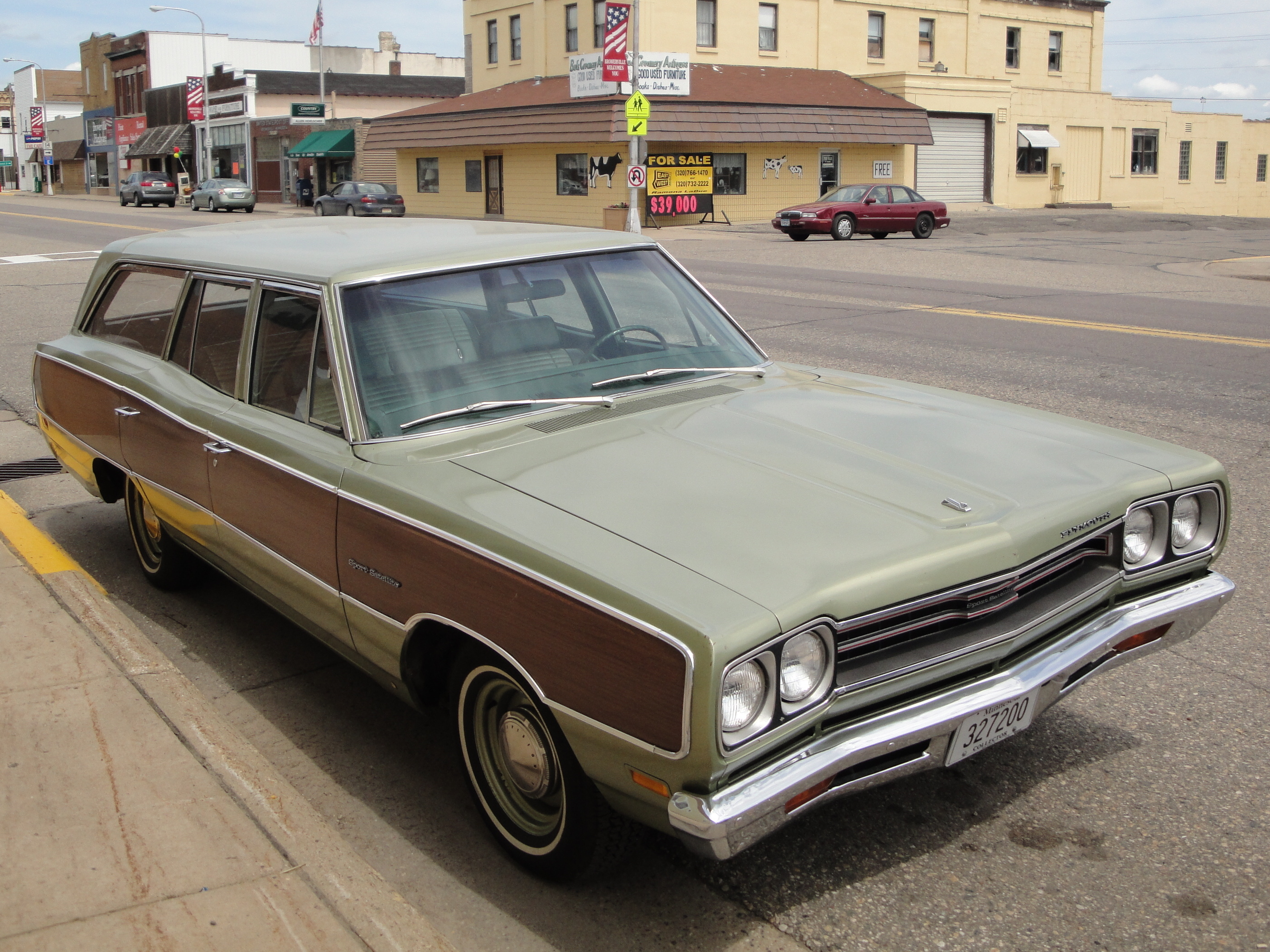
1969 Plymouth Sport Satellite Wagon

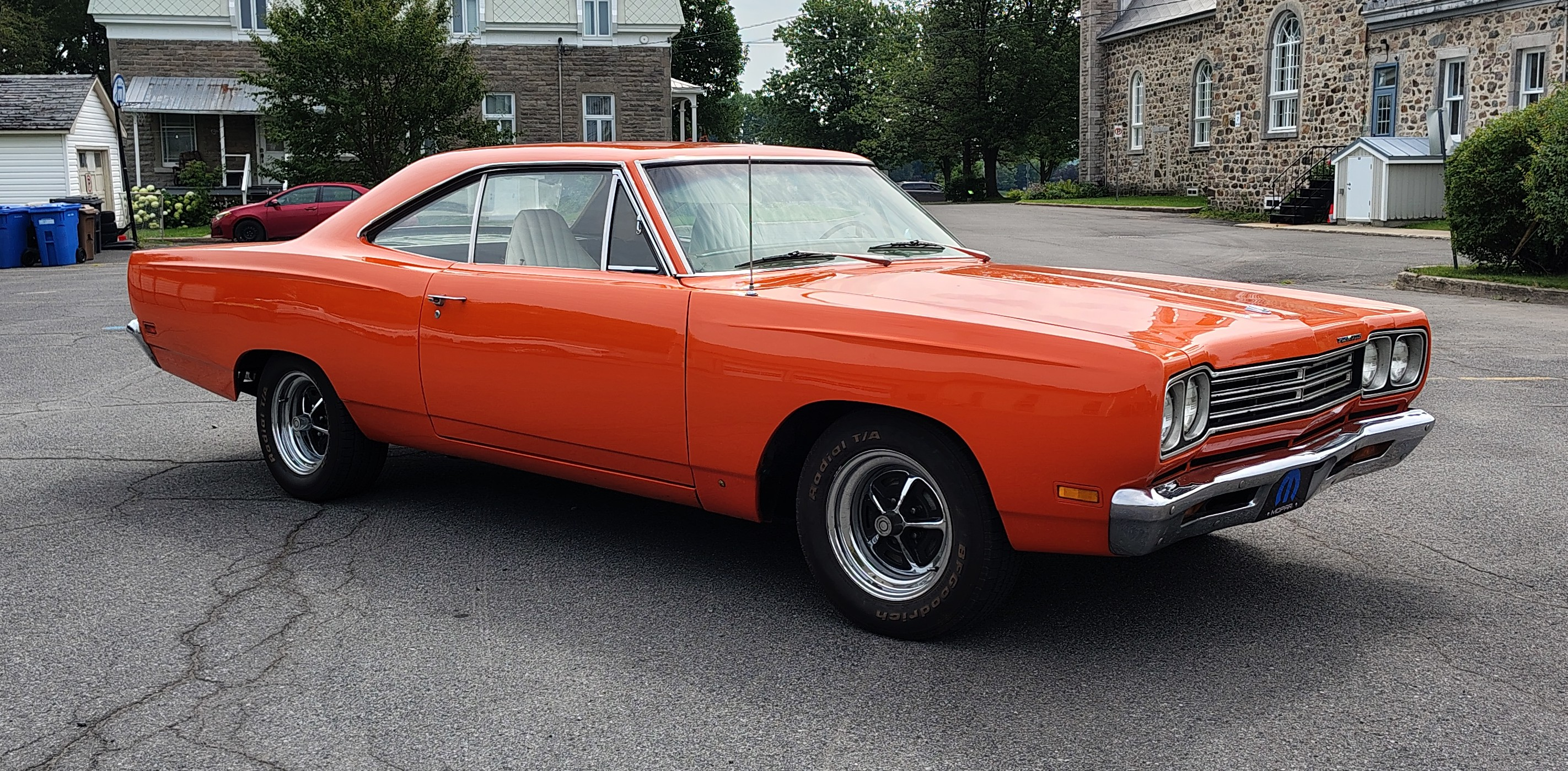
1969 Plymouth Satellite hardtop

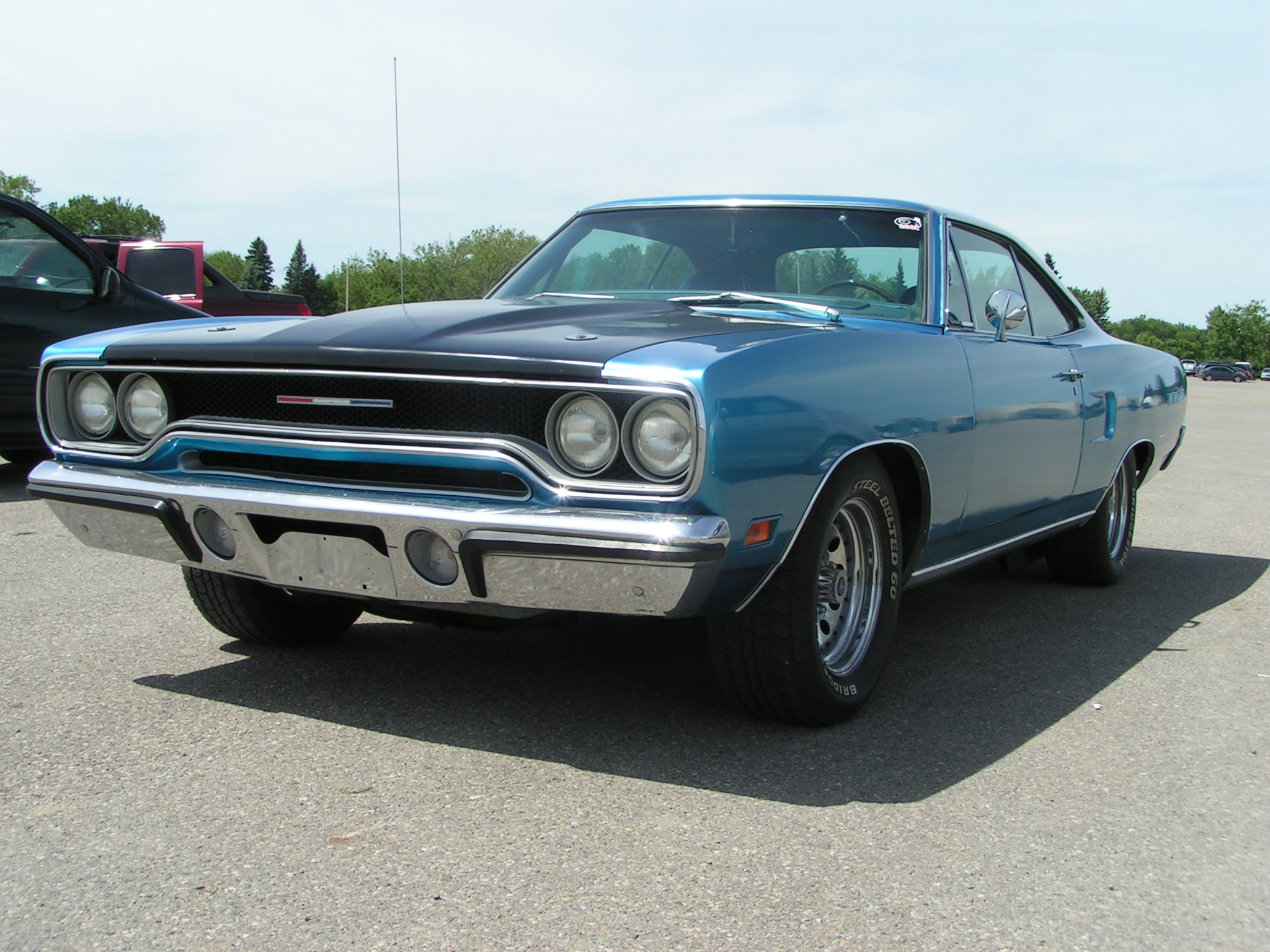
1970 Plymouth Sport Satellite

== Third generation (1971–1974) ==
Third generation
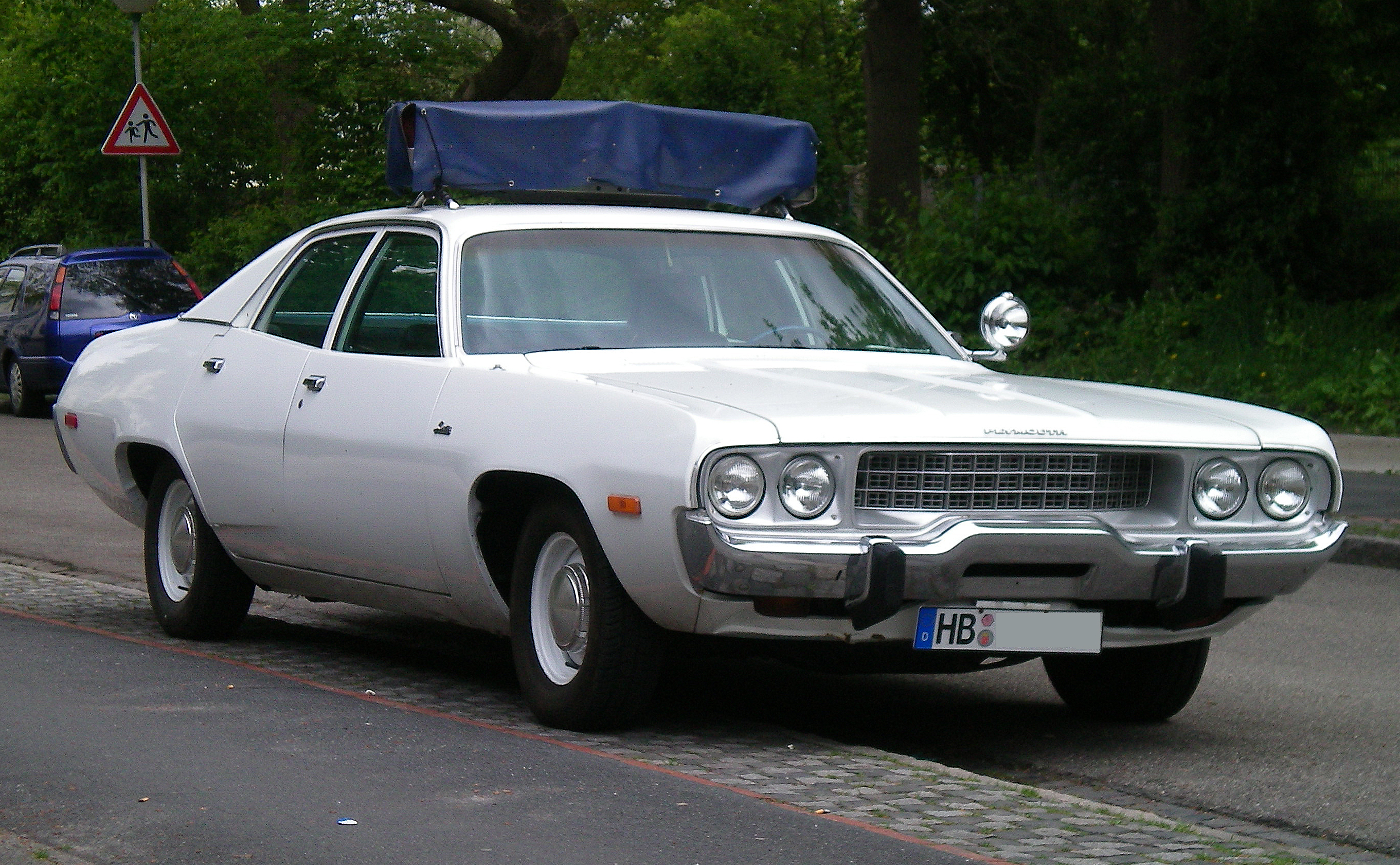
- 1973 Plymouth Satellite

Overview
- Production: 1970–1974
- Model years: 1971–1974

Body and chassis
- Body style: 2-door coupe; 2-door hardtop; 4-door sedan; 4-door station wagon
- Related: Dodge Charger; Dodge Coronet; Plymouth Roadrunner

Powertrain
- Engine: 225 cu in (3.7 L) Slant 6; 273 cu in (4.5 L) V8; 318 cu in (5.2 L) V8; 340 cu in (5.6 L) V8; 360 cu in (5.9 L) V8; 383 cu in (6.3 L) V8; 440 cu in (7.2 L) V8; 426 cu in (7.0 L) V8; (1971 only)
- Transmission: 3-speed manual; 4-speed manual; 3-speed automatic

A new design was introduced for the 1971 model year. The Satellite adopted new "fuselage" styling - in line with the facelifts on the larger Chrysler C-Body models - on the two-door, four-door, and wagon models. Unlike previous years, 4-door sedans and 2-door coupes did not share sheet metal and each carried unique styling. Sedans were available in base, Custom, and Brougham trim, while two-doors were available in 5 trim levels. All VIN numbers started with the letter R for Satellite followed by the letter for the trim ordered RL(LOW)code was the base model for the Satellite, RM (Medium) Satellite Roadrunner, RH (High) Satellite Sebring, RP (Premium) Satellite Sebring Plus and top-of-the-line RS (Special) Satellite GTX. Two-door models had a loop-type front bumper, 2-door coupes had a wheelbase of 115 inches, while 4-door sedans, as well as station wagons, had a wheelbase of 117 inches.

For the 1973 model year, the two-door models received a more conventional front-end design, with squared-up sheet metal and rear side windows. Safety requirements for the 1974 model year included 5 mph (8.0 km/h) bumpers for the sedans and wagons. The Satellite name was dropped after 1974, after which Plymouth's intermediate offerings on the B-body chassis acquired the Plymouth Fury name. The Satellite Sebring, named for the Sebring International Raceway in Sebring, Florida, was replaced by the Chrysler Cordoba (a car which was originally intended to be called Plymouth Sebring) and shared an all-new body with the Dodge Charger. The Sebring name would be revived by Chrysler on an unrelated model in 1995.

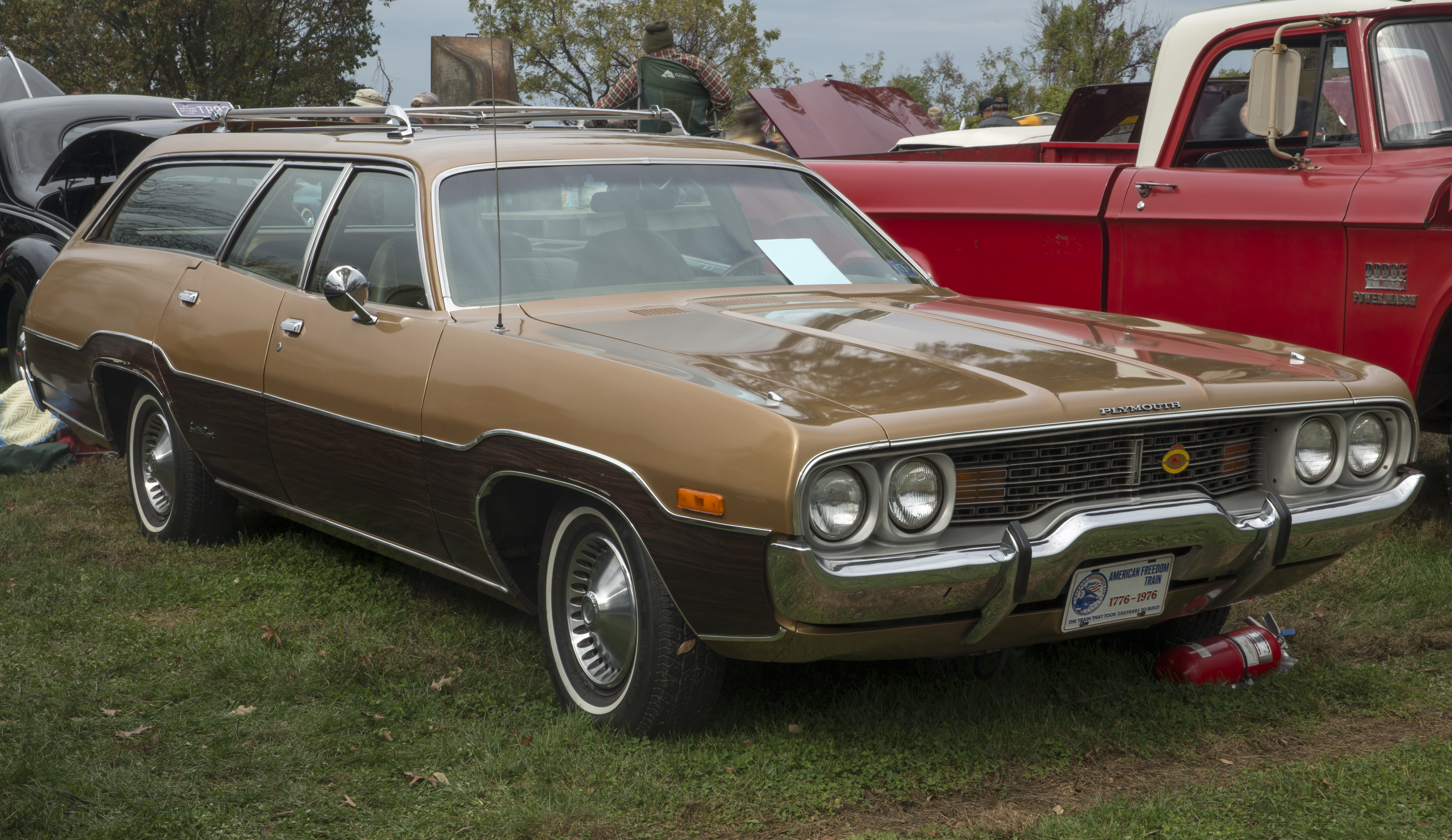
1972 Satellite Regent station wagon

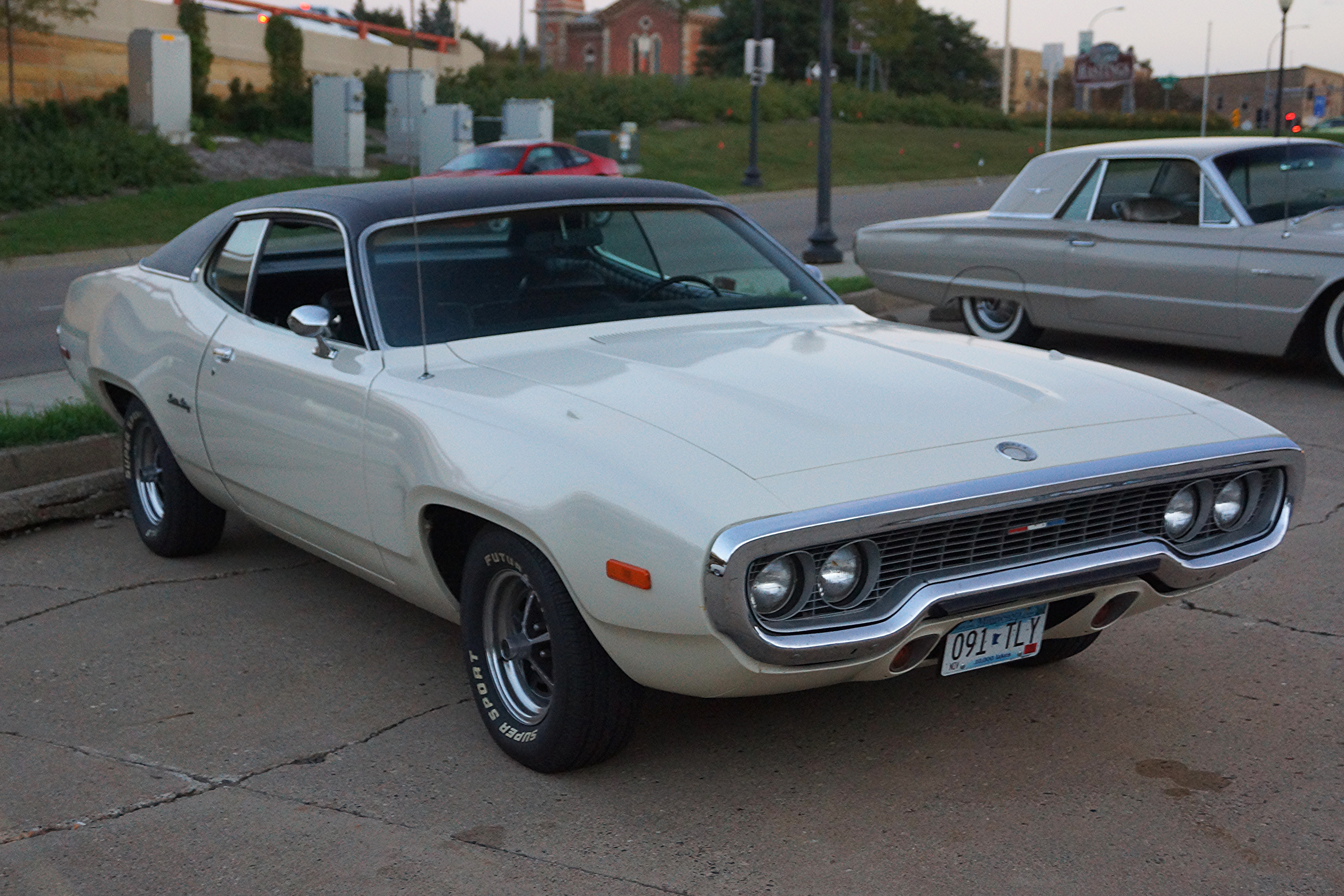
1972 Plymouth Satellite Sebring

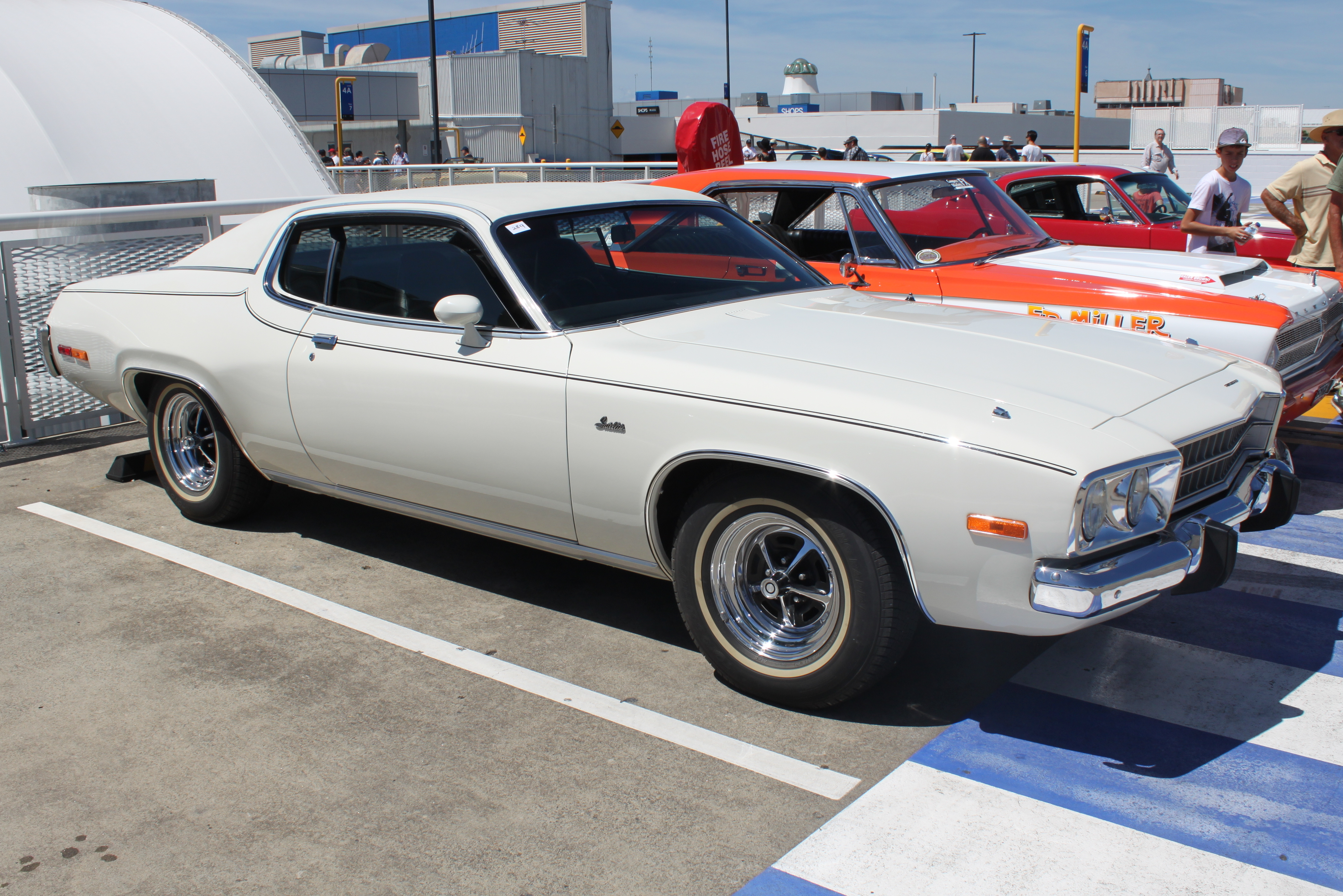
1973 Plymouth Satellite Sebring

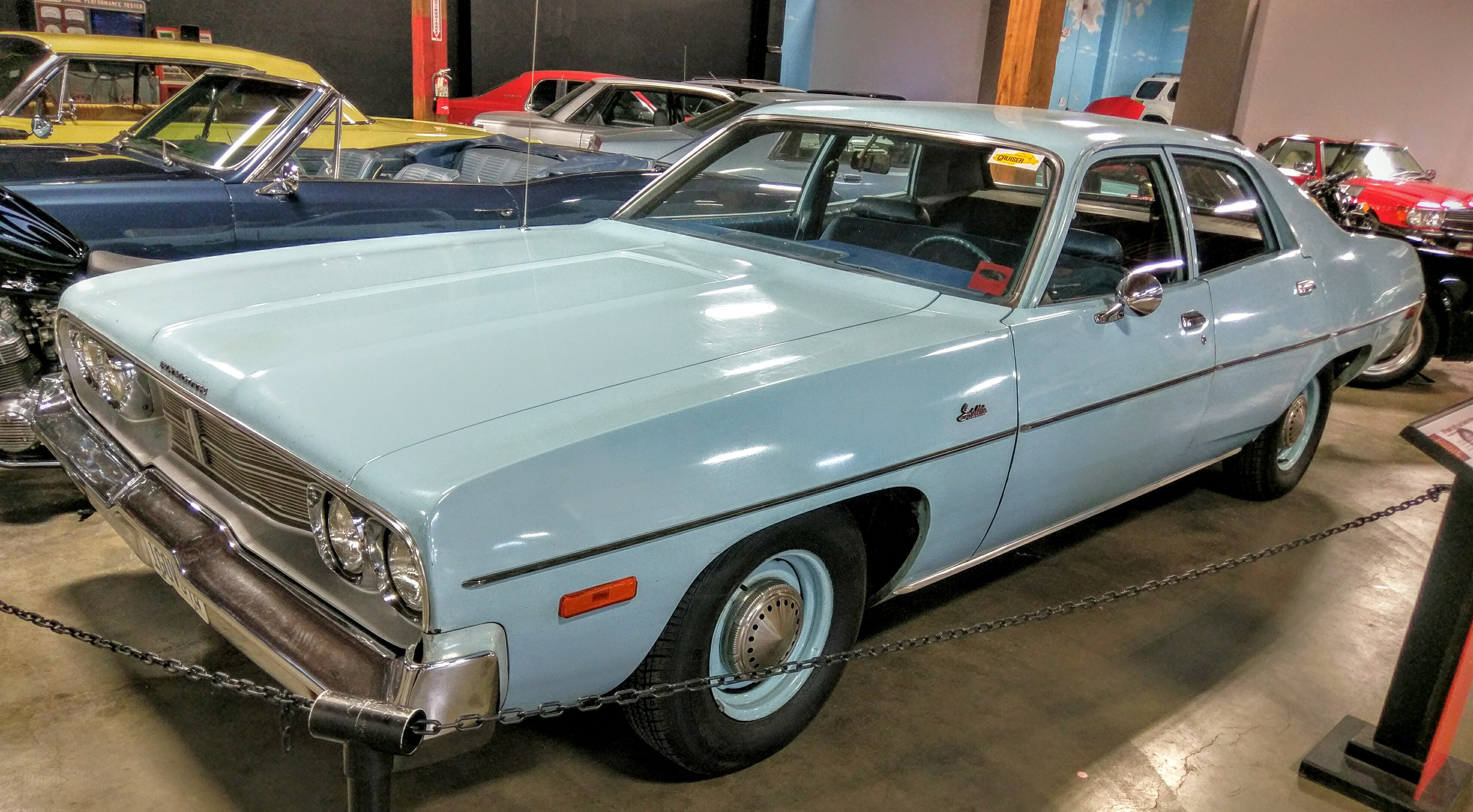
1974 Plymouth Satellite sedan
