= Dodge St. Regis =

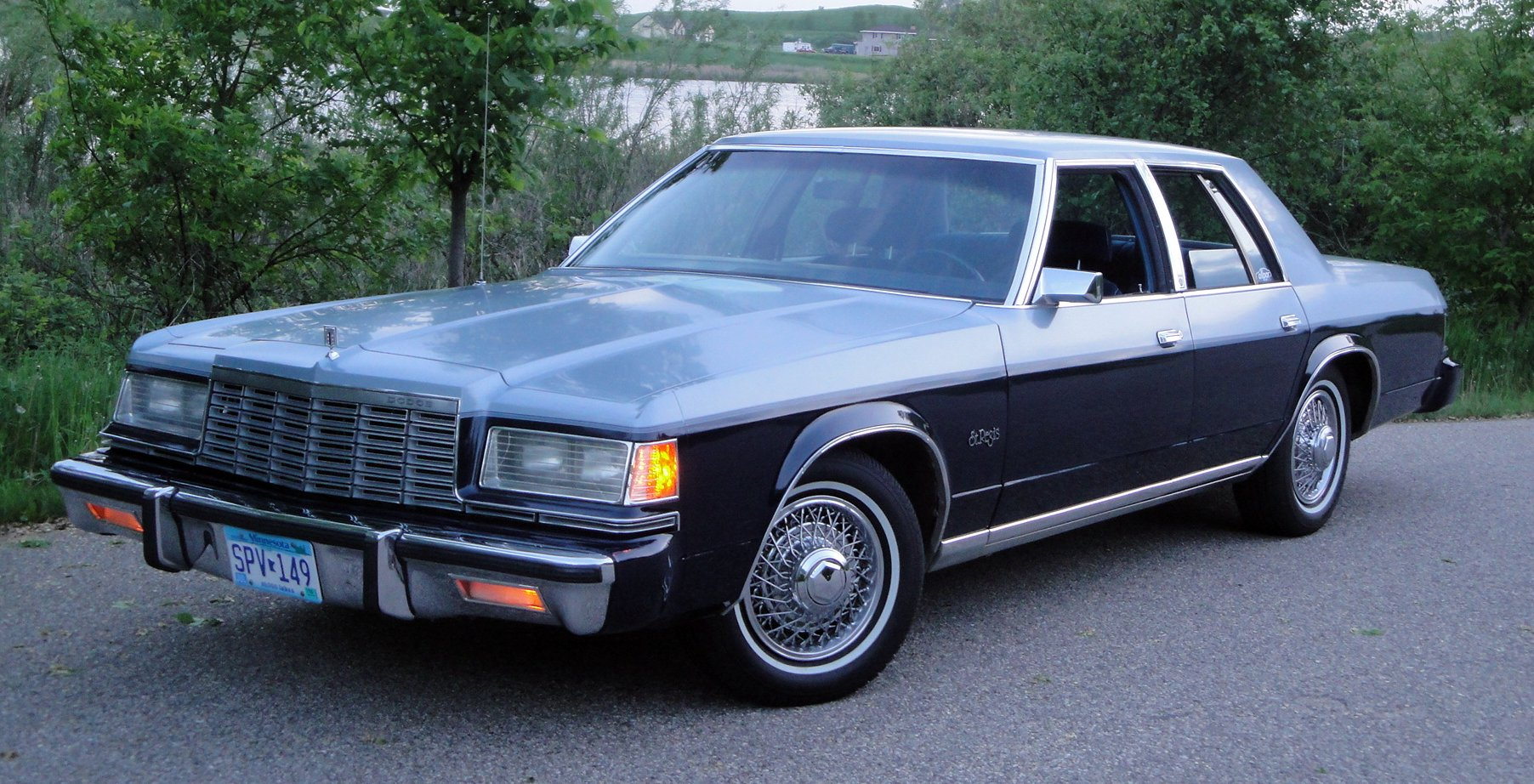
- 1980 St. Regis

Overview
- Manufacturer: Dodge (Chrysler)
- Production: 1978–1981
- Model years: 1979–1981
- Assembly: United States: Detroit, Michigan (Lynch Road Assembly)

Body and chassis
- Class: Full-size
- Body style: 4-door notchback sedan
- Layout: FR layout
- Platform: R-body
- Related: Chrysler Newport; Chrysler New Yorker; Plymouth Gran Fury

Powertrain
- Engine: 225 cu in (3.7 L) Slant 6 I6; 318 cu in (5.2 L) LA V8; 360 cu in (5.9 L) LA V8
- Transmission: 3-speed A727 automatic 3-speed A904 automatic

Dimensions
- Wheelbase: 118.5 in (3,009.9 mm)
- Length: 220.2 in (5,593.1 mm)
- Width: 77.1 in (1,958.3 mm)
- Height: 54.5 in (1,384.3 mm)
- Curb weight: 3,810 lb (1,730 kg)

Chronology
- Predecessor: Dodge Monaco
- Successor: Dodge Monaco (fifth generation)

The Dodge St. Regis is a full-size automobile which was manufactured by the Chrysler Corporation from 1978 to 1981 and marketed by Dodge from the 1979 to 1981 model years. Replacing the Monaco, the St. Regis was the largest Dodge sedan, positioned above the mid-size Diplomat and Aspen. In contrast to both the Monaco and the Diplomat, the St. Regis was offered solely as a four-door sedan. With a production run of three model years over a single generation, the St. Regis is one of the shortest-lived Dodge nameplates.

Deriving its name from a 1950s Chrysler trim package, the St. Regis was the first example of downsizing of the full-size Dodge sedan line. For 1982, the model line was discontinued, with the Dodge Diplomat serving as the largest Dodge; the next full-size Dodge sedan was the 1990 Dodge Monaco (derived from the Eagle Premier, itself a version of the Renault 25). Dodge would not market a rear-wheel drive sedan until the 2006 Dodge Charger.

The Dodge St. Regis was assembled alongside the Chrysler Newport, Chrysler New Yorker, and Plymouth Gran Fury by Chrysler at Lynch Road Assembly (Detroit, Michigan), becoming the final production vehicles produced at the facility. In total, 64,502 examples were produced.

== Design overview ==
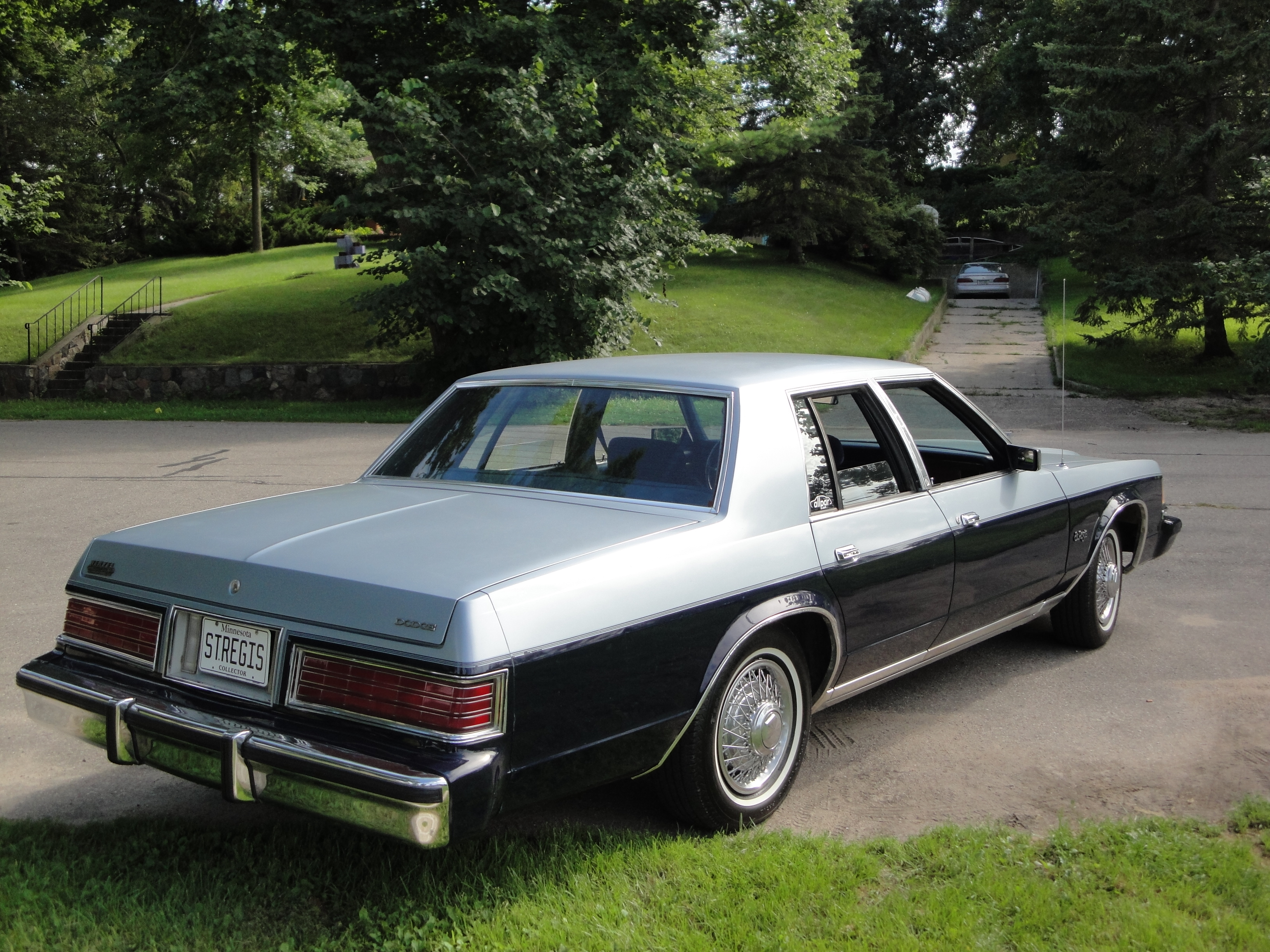
1980 Dodge St.Regis

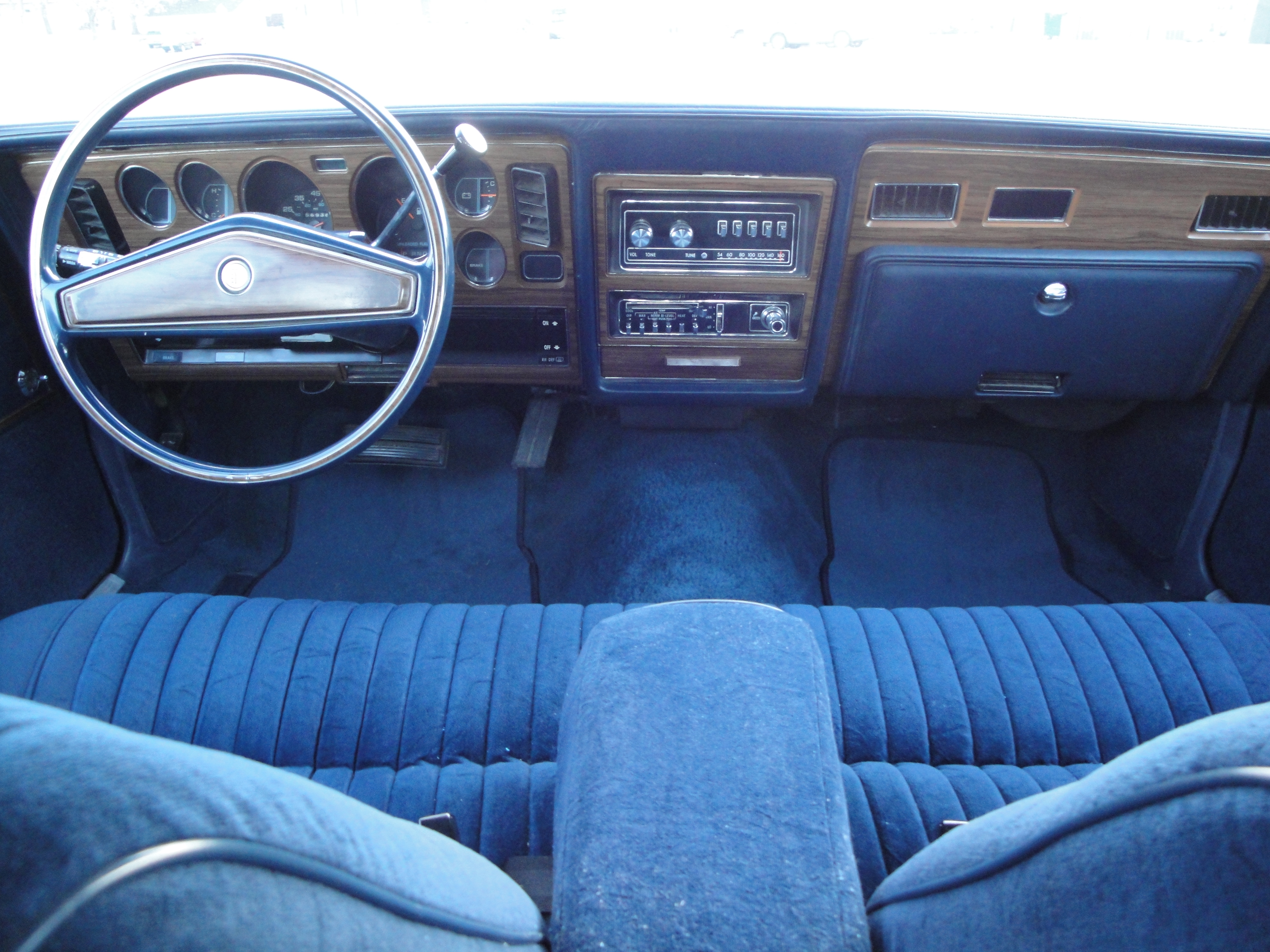
Interior

The Dodge St. Regis was based on the rear wheel drive Chrysler R-body platform. As Chrysler needed to expedite a downsized replacement for the 1974–1977 C-body to market (in response to the 1973 oil crisis), the R-body was developed from existing underpinnings at minimal costs. In place of redesigning the full-size C-body, Chrysler developed the R-body as an update of the intermediate B-body (last released in 1971, dating to 1962). Used by a wide variety of Chrysler model lines, the B-body architecture underpinned model lines ranging from the Dodge Coronet and Plymouth Belvedere to the Dodge Charger and Chrysler Cordoba.

Compared to its 1977 Dodge Royal Monaco predecessor, the Dodge St. Regis shed 5.5 inches in length, 2.7 inches in width, 3 inches in wheelbase, and nearly 900 pounds of curb weight (dependent on powertrain). The 225 Slant-6 inline-6 was now the standard engine with optional 318 and 360 V8s; a three-speed automatic was paired to all three engines. In deference to fuel economy standards, the 400 and 440 big-block V8s were deleted from the engine lineup. The front suspension continued to feature Chrysler's longitudinal front torsion bars, called Torsion-Aire, with an anti-sway bar, and a solid rear axle connected to leaf springs.

The "St. Regis" name first saw use as an uplevel trim package on the 1956 New Yorker hardtop coupe and again on the 1974–78 Chrysler New Yorker Brougham coupe.

Offered only as a four-door notchback sedan, the St. Regis was styled with frameless door glass (the rear quarter glass was fixed). To further distinguish the model line from its Plymouth Gran Fury, Chrysler Newport, and Chrysler New Yorker counterparts, the front fascia was styled with transparent retractable headlamp covers (introduced on the 1978 Dodge Magnum).

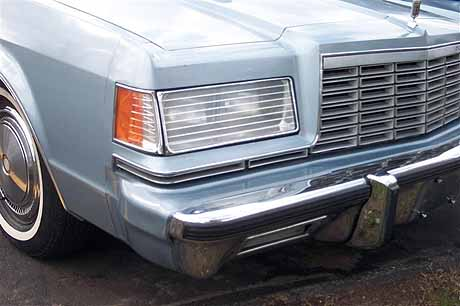
lights off

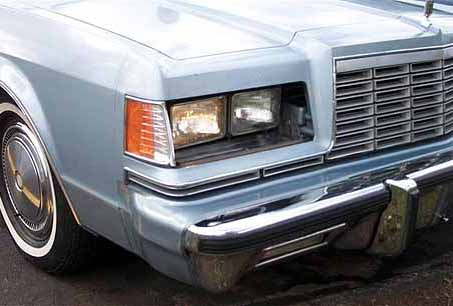
lights on

== Market timing ==
The Chrysler R-body cars (like their 1974–78 predecessors) arrived at precisely the wrong time, as a second gasoline crisis hit the U.S. in 1979. In contrast to the clean-sheet Ford and GM designs, the dire financial situation of Chrysler relegated the company to retool an existing chassis.

While shifting to an intermediate chassis allowed the St. Regis a smaller exterior footprint over the 1974-1977 Monaco, it remained far larger than its Ford LTD and Chevrolet Caprice competitors (at 220.2 inches long, an inch shorter than a Cadillac Fleetwood Brougham).

Coinciding with the 1979 fuel crisis, high interest rates and the uncertain future of the company forced Chrysler into a high proportion of fleet sales for its full-size sedans. Despite being an introductory model, nearly 30% of St. Regis production was dedicated for police/law enforcement use. For 1979, Chrysler withdrew Plymouth entirely from the full-size segment (making the Volare the largest Plymouth that year); for 1980, a R-body Gran Fury was reinstated, nearly exclusively for fleet sales.

== Discontinuation ==
The Chrysler R platform was dropped during the middle of the 1981 model year, with the Dodge St. Regis ending its product run; to reduce model overlap, Chrysler ended sales of the Newport. For 1982, Dodge began marketing the Diplomat as its largest four-door sedan; nearly 16 inches shorter than the St. Regis, the mid-size Diplomat was the final rear-wheel drive sedan marketed by Dodge during the 1980s.

For 1990, the Dodge brand re-entered the full-size segment with the fifth-generation Dodge Monaco. A rebranded version of the Eagle Premier (adapted from the Renault 25), the 1990 Monaco was the first version produced with front-wheel drive, slotted above the Dodge Dynasty in size. For 1993, Dodge introduced its first Chrysler-developed full-size sedan with front-wheel drive, the Dodge Intrepid. While closer in exterior size to the Diplomat, the Intrepid nearly matches the St. Regis in interior room.

== Production ==
Production
Year	Units
1979	34,434
1980	17,068
1981	13,000
Total Production = 64,502

== Engine comparison ==
Performance comparison	78 Fury	78 Monaco	79 St. Regis	80 St. Regis	81 St. Regis	81 St. Regis
Engine (cid)	440	400	360	360	318	225
HP, SAE	255 bhp	190 bhp	195 bhp	185 bhp	165 bhp	85 bhp
Axle ratio	2.71:1	3.21:1	3.21:1	2.94:1	2.94:1	2:94:1
Weight (lbs)	4,413	4,369	4,530	4,100	4,086	3,990
Wheelbase (in)	117.4	117.4	118.5	118.5	118.5	118.5
Road course lap time	91.1	93.6	91.65	91.8	93.93	NA
0–60 mph	NA	NA	10.1	11.3	12.76	19.79
0–100 mph	24.8	34.4	30.2	36.7	45.72	DNF
Top Speed, mph	133	117	122.9	122.7	114.7	90.6
Braking, ft/sec2	23.3	22.6	21.4	23.5	23.67	22.95
1/4 mi. time	NA	NA	NA	18.4	19.63	22.27
1/4 mi speed	NA	NA	NA	77.5	74.50	70.42
Fuel, EPA city	10	13	12	11	15.5	19

== Use in law enforcement ==
Following its introduction, the Dodge St. Regis saw heavy use as a police car in the United States. Outside of California, a 195-hp 360 V8 engine was available as part of the A38 Police Package; the option package was popular by law enforcement of the time. In California, the St. Regis was fitted with a 190 hp (140 kW) four-bbl 360 V8. For 1980, the 360 was replaced by a 155 hp (116 kW) 318 V8 4-bbl with California emissions to comply with state emissions regulations; specification sheets provided by Dodge for these cars omitted references to low rates of acceleration and top speed.

The California Highway Patrol (CHP) was a major purchaser of the St. Regis, taking delivery of 900 for $7,091 (equivalent to $27,708 in 2025) each with 318 V8 powertrains. The changed powertrain proved unpopular with the CHP, as the top speed of the St. Regis was reduced to 85 mph (137 km/h), or 65 mph (105 km/h) while ascending a hill. Nicknamed 'dog cars' by officers, the CHP approved efforts to remove the St. Regis from their fleet at a meeting of California's Little Hoover Commission in October 1980, selling 86, some of which had yet to enter service, by the end of the year for the same price they were purchased, and replacing them with Chevrolets.

== Television and collectors ==
Coinciding with its usage in law enforcement, the St. Regis appeared on multiple 1980s police-based television series, including Sledge Hammer!, The A-Team , "CHiPs", and T.J. Hooker.

While the St. Regis is of little collector value today (alongside Chrysler/Plymouth R-body counterparts), the mechanical commonality of the R platform with earlier Chrysler vehicles leads collectors to search for scrapped examples for its front disc brakes to upgrade earlier cars (such as the Dodge Dart and Plymouth Barracuda). With the low number built (in comparison to its Ford and Chevrolet competitors) and the high percentage destroyed in film and TV work or retired after police use, very few examples survive today.

== Sources ==
- Sanow, Edwin J (1994). Dodge, Plymouth & Chrysler Police Cars 1956–1978. Osceola, WI: Motorbooks International Publishers and Wholesalers. ISBN 978-0-87938-958-1.
