= Chrysler R platform =

Chrysler R Platform
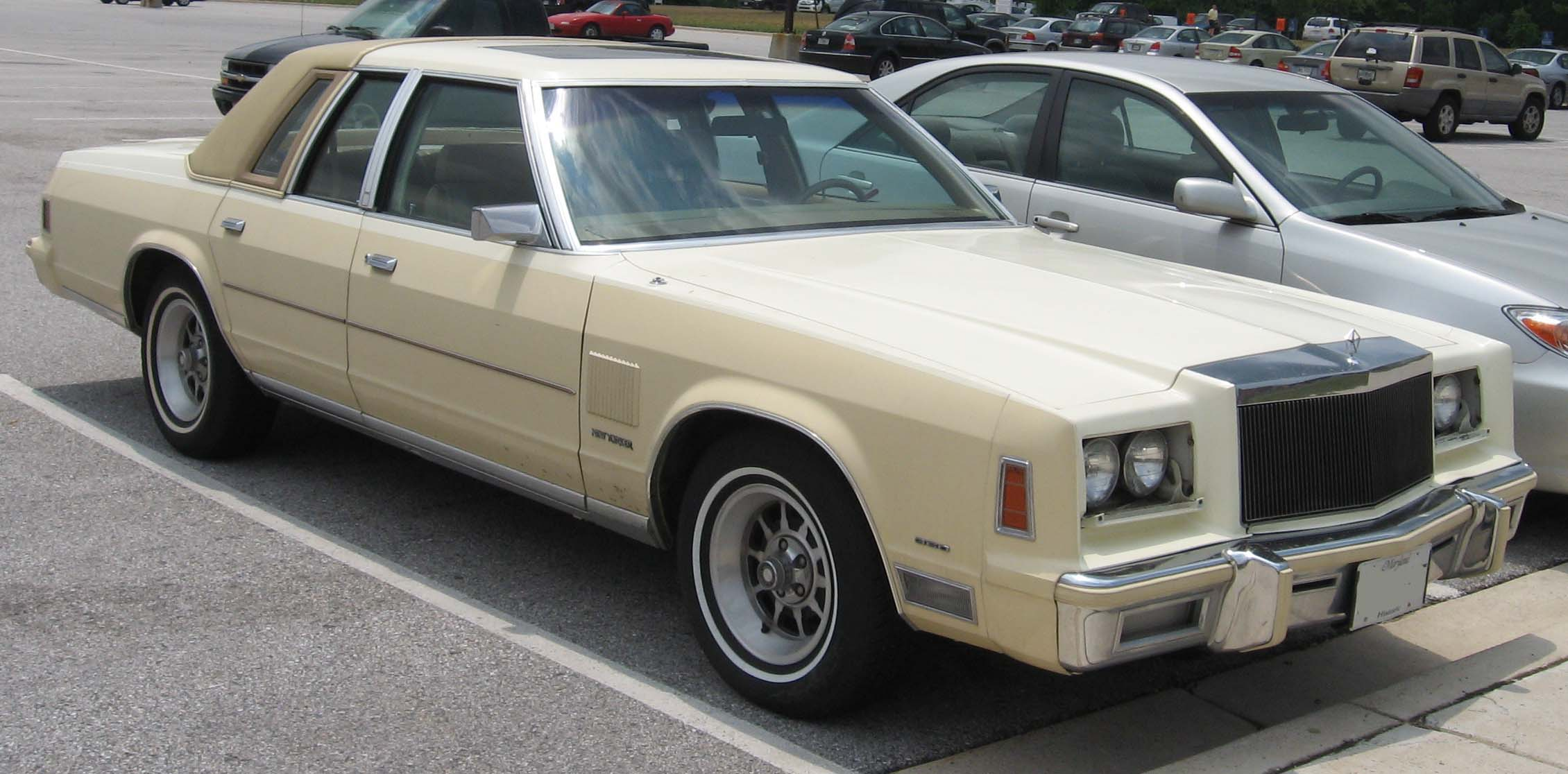

Overview
- Manufacturer: Chrysler Corporation
- Production: 1978–1981

Body and chassis
- Class: Full-size
- Layout: FR layout
- Body style: 4-door sedan

Powertrain
- Engines: 3.7 L (225 cu in) Slant 6 I6; 5.2 L (318 cu in) LA V8; 5.9 L (360 cu in) LA V8
- Transmissions: 3-speed A727 automatic 3-speed A904 automatic

Dimensions
- Wheelbase: 118.5 in (3,010 mm)

Chronology
- Predecessor: C-body
- Successor: M-body

The Chrysler R platform was introduced for the 1979 model year. The first example of downsizing of the full-size Chrysler sedan line, the R-body is an evolution of the B-body intermediate chassis. Competing against the downsized General Motors B-body chassis and the all-new Ford Panther chassis, the R-body is the longest-wheelbase of the three. In contrast to Ford and GM, Chrysler only marketed the R-body as a four-door sedan.

Produced for only three years, the production run of the R-body chassis was far shorter than its competitors (GM B-body, 19 years; Ford Panther; 32 years). For 1981, Chrysler ended sales of the R-body chassis that April, marketing the M-body chassis for its largest sedans from that point forward.

== Background ==
As the middle of the 1970s approached, Chrysler was facing an increasingly worrisome organizational and financial situation due to a combination of internal and external factors. The company offered reskinned, somewhat shorter full-sized C-body models for 1974, but despite trimming 3.5 inches from the full-size Plymouth and 8 inches from the full-size Dodge, these were still very much full-sized cars and sold poorly in the wake of the 1973 OPEC oil embargo. Unable to fix the mounting difficulties beyond unsuccessful sales incentives, chairman Lynn A. Townsend took early retirement and left the reins to John Ricardo. By 1976, Chrysler had exhausted its cash reserves and had to pay for all operating costs with purely sales revenue. Ricardo attempted to seek a bailout from the Federal government to the tune of $7.5 billion, but President Jimmy Carter immediately turned him down.

Then in September 1976, GM released new, radically downsized standard cars which were nearly 10 inches (250 mm) shorter and lighter by almost 700 pounds. The Chevrolet Caprice won Motor Trend Magazine's Car Of The Year Award and quickly became the best-selling car in America. Lacking the resources for a similar undertaking (GM had spent $600 million on the project), Chrysler was forced to respond in a more modest way.

The full-sized C-body Dodge and Plymouth lines were dropped for 1978, in part because they were finding few customers outside the fleet market (the C-body Chryslers lasted one more year). At this point, the mid-sized B-body Monaco and Fury were left as Chrysler's largest cars, but an outdated design that could not compete with GM and also by that point were more popular with police departments than private buyers.

During this time, the R-body project commenced which consisted of an entirely new body shell, plus all new interiors, to which existing powertrain and drivetrain components were added. There was considerable dispute over the cars' final appearance. GM had not only made its downsized big cars smaller, but styled them to look less ponderous. However, in the end, it was decided to retain a heavier "big car" look on the R-bodies with blocky, imposing lines. A variety of engineering measures were employed to reduce weight, improve reliability, and modernize components. Big-block engines had already vanished, which left the 225-cid Slant Six, 318 cid V8, and 360 cid V8 (unavailable after 1979 in California, and all markets after March 1980. These were mated to the 3-speed Torqueflite automatic transmission. This done, Chrysler retired the B-body Dodge Monaco and Plymouth Fury along with the C-body Chrysler Newport and New Yorker at the close of the 1978 model year.

However, the company was still facing a dire financial situation (which wasn't helped in any of its parts by the R-body sales disaster) and it was obvious that new blood was needed, especially as President Carter had written off Chrysler's management as incompetent and made it clear that no federal bailout would happen so long as the status quo were maintained. Thus, Lee Iacocca was hired as company president in July 1978 three months after his expulsion from Ford. John Ricardo held onto his position as chairman for another year, but his presence merely stood in the way of the hoped-for federal bailout, thus he summarily resigned in early 1979 with Iacocca assuming his position. By the summer of 1980 Chrysler Corporation through ardent negotiations with Congress secured a $1.5 billion loan guarantee, which allowed the company to put into production the K-Car line and intensify development of the Minivan line of vehicles.

== Models ==
Model Name	Model Years	Body Styles	Notes
Chrysler Newport	1979-1981	4-door sedan	Base-trim model served as replacement for Plymouth Fury
Chrysler New Yorker	1979-1981	4-door sedan	1979 model year introduced Fifth Avenue trim line
Dodge St. Regis	1979-1981	4-door sedan	All-new nameplate, replaced Dodge Monaco Sold mostly for fleet use after 1979
Plymouth Gran Fury	1980-1981	4-door sedan	Introduced due to demand by fleet customers. Plymouth Gran Fury was, in essence, a Newport with slightly different external trim.

Billed as "pillared hardtops", all R-body vehicles were available as four-door sedans only. No coupe, convertible, or station wagon was offered; Chrysler could not afford to develop these additional body styles. All R-body models were built at Plymouth's Lynch Road Plant in Detroit.

The R-bodies ended up being three inches (76 mm) longer than the B-body Dodge Monaco and Plymouth Fury. Initial sales started off strong, and proceeded that way for most of the 1979 model year, with just over 121,000 produced and sold. However, in the spring of 1979, the Iranian Revolution was in full swing. Gas prices rose sharply, and the US economy plunged into a deep recession that would last for the next three years. Sales of the R-bodies sank abruptly for the 1980 and 1981 model years, and never recovered. The line was initially planned to be dropped after the 1980 model year, but strong protest from the fleet community (especially police departments) gave the R-body line a short reprieve for 1981.

Initially, there was no Plymouth version of the R-body as company production manager Eugene Cafiero decided to pull the plug on all Plymouths larger than the Volare. This decision angered police fleet managers, who wanted a full-size Plymouth. In '79, substituting for the Fury was a stripped Chrysler Newport offered for the police market, which ended up proving quite popular with law enforcement agencies. Chrysler bowed to pressure and brought back an R-body Plymouth Gran Fury for the 1980 model year, which served alongside the smaller (but better performing) F-body Volare, which itself was discontinued in 1980, as was the 360 V8 engine in all cars.

The R-bodies proved relatively popular with police departments in '79, the big Plymouth actually sold more than the St Regis or New Yorker/Newport in 1980 and '81. Reliability was fair, but that wasn't saying much, since the B-body Dodges and Plymouths suffered an alarming drop in quality control starting in 1976. On the other hand, big-block engines were gone and the 195 nhp 360 4bbl V8 was now the top optional power plant for Chrysler's police pursuit package. The E58 code police spec 360 V8; equipped with a Carter Thermoquad carburetor, dual exhausts, and a mild camshaft, could propel the cars to 120 mph in 1979, which was respectable if somewhat less than 1978 440 V8-equipped B-bodies which had been able to attain speeds over 130 mph.

In 1980, the E58 Police 360 gained the new Electronic Fuel Control (feedback fuel system), in addition to Electronic Spark Advance. Both modules were contained inside what was formerly known as the Spark Control Computer, attached to the side of the air cleaner. Horsepower was down a bit for 1980, at 185 nhp, but—with the new police rear gear ratio set at 2.94—top speed increased to 125 mph in Michigan State Police testing. Unfortunately, a nearly-bankrupt Chrysler Corporation decided to outsource 360 V8 production to Saltillo, Mexico (where all Magnum 318/360 and 3G Hemi V8s were later made). In March 1980, Windsor Engine discontinued 360 production, and the engine was no longer offered in any Chrysler passenger vehicle, including fleet models.

In April 1981, Chrysler discontinued automobile production at the Plymouth Lynch Road facility, and R-body assembly came to an end. By that time, the M-body cars had long since replaced them in police fleets. The M-body was a little smaller, and had a rather unusual transverse torsion bar suspension, but they were lighter, nearly as quick and fast, better-built, and were less expensive.

== Sales ==
Sales for 1979-1981, by model
	New Yorker	Newport	St Regis	Gran Fury	Gran Fury Salon
1979	54,640	60,904	34,434	not available	not available
1980	13,513	9,002	17,068	12,576	2,024
1981	5,431	5,002	13,000	15,073	not available
MSRP (w/V8 engine)	$8,631 ($33,726 in 2025 dollars)	$6,328 ($24,727 in 2025 dollars)	$6,455 ($25,223 in 2025 dollars)	$6,513 ($25,450 in 2025 dollars)	$6,944 ($27,134 in 2025 dollars)
