= Lynch Road Assembly =

Chrysler assembly plant

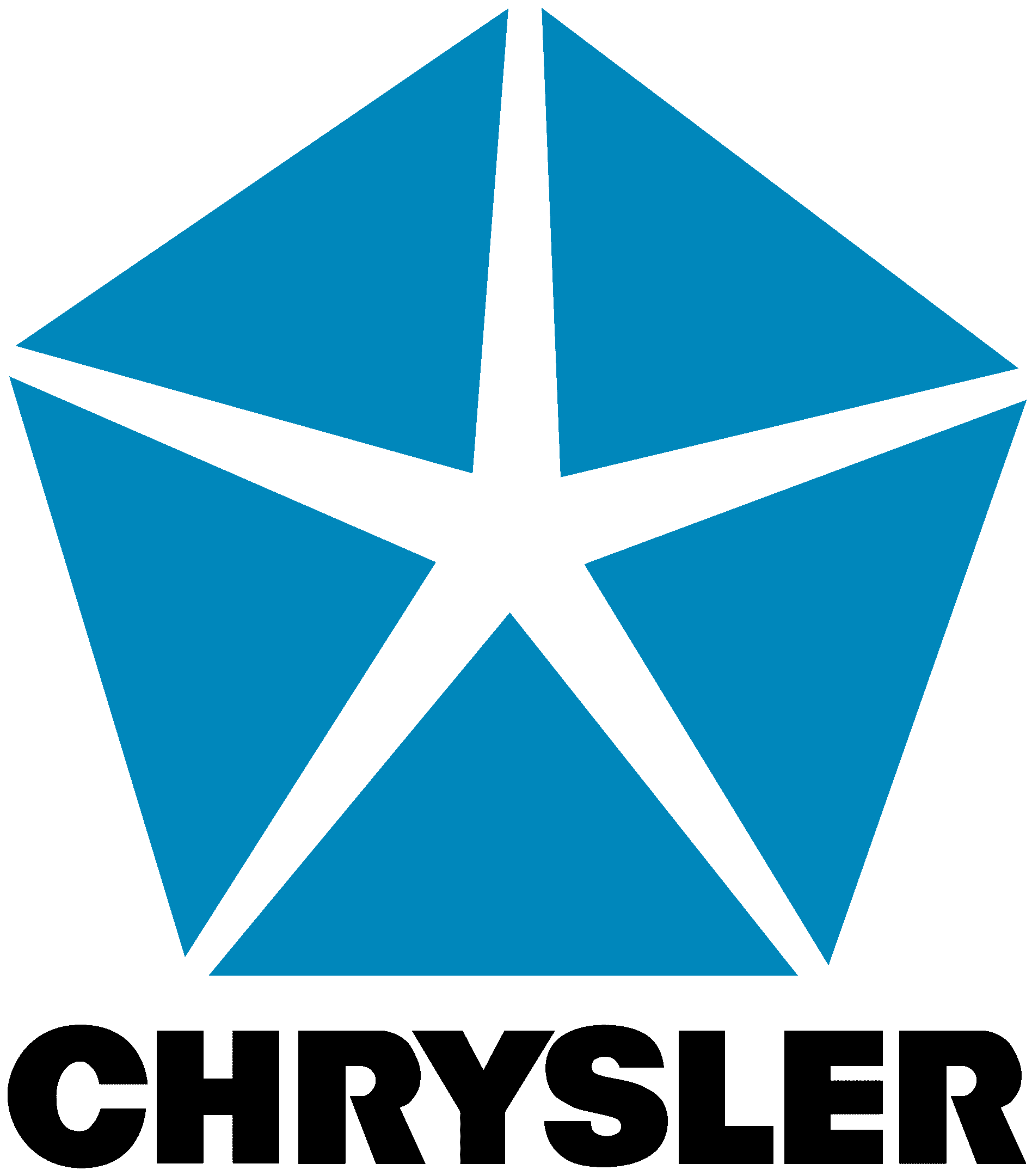
- Operated: 1928–1981
- Location: 6334 Lynch Road; Detroit
- Coordinates: 42.4032°N 83.0365°W
- Industry: Automotive
- Products: Automobiles
- Owner: Chrysler
- Defunct: 1981; 45 years ago

Lynch Road Assembly was a Chrysler assembly plant located in Detroit, Michigan near Coleman A. Young International Airport. It is now the location of warehouse operations for Greater Development, a diversified real estate holdings company based in South Eastern Michigan.

Lynch Road was opened for DeSoto and Plymouth production in 1928 at 6334 Lynch Rd and was approximately two miles north of the Dodge Main factory, and was built in only three months where two crews of workmen started at the opposite ends towards the center, and two crews worked from the center outwards.

During World War II the plant first manufactured tank transmissions and truck parts, but in mid-1943 it was converted to produce uranium enrichment diffusers for K-25 plant.

When Chrysler began having financial problems during the 1970s, the decision was made to close the factory along with the Hamtramck Dodge Factory and production ended in April 1981, where the Newark Assembly in Delaware continued operations. DeSotos were also manufactured at Wyoming Road Assembly in Detroit after the factory was purchased from GM after LaSalles were cancelled. When the Chrysler B platform was introduced in 1962, production switched to Dodge and Plymouth products that used this platform in 1964.

== Automobiles ==
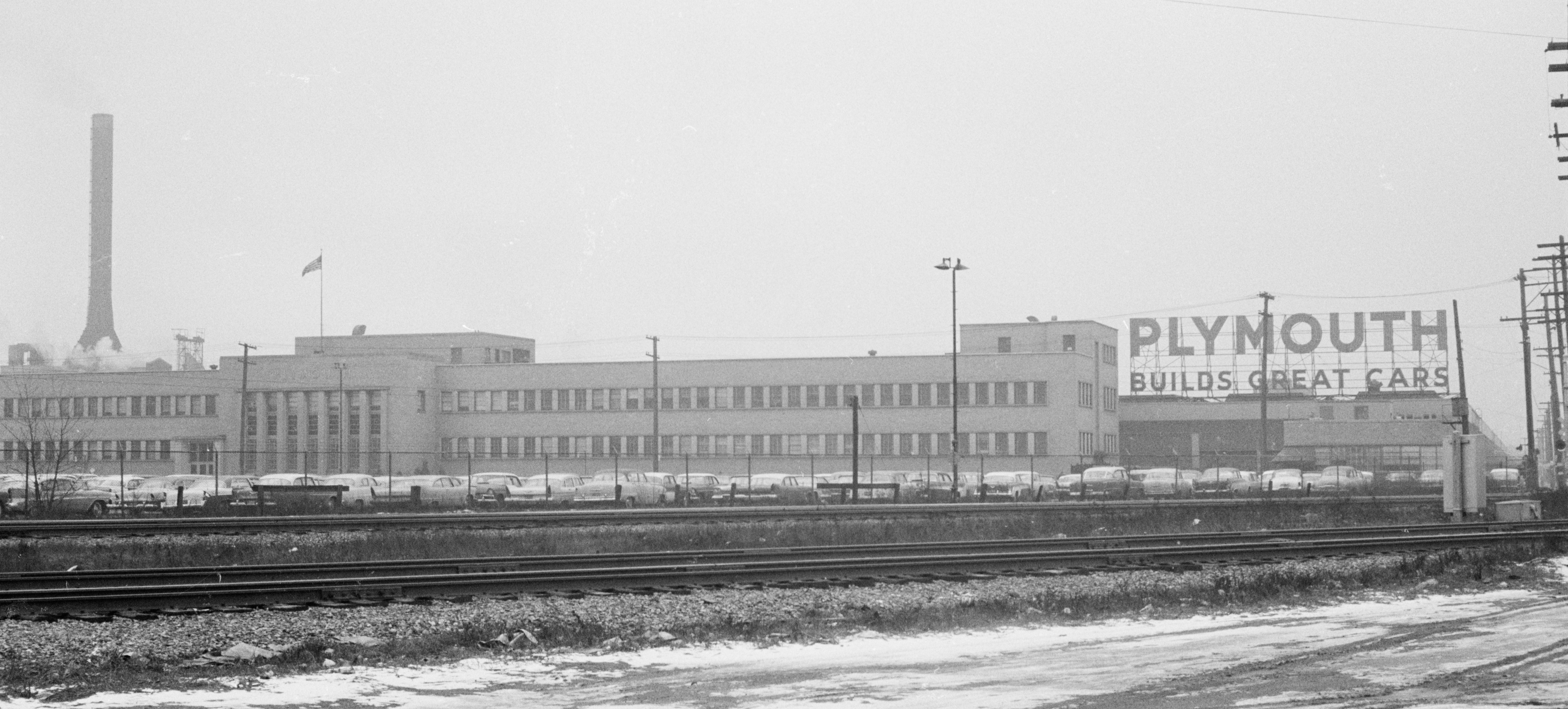
Exterior view of the Lynch Road Assembly in 1958

Chrysler Corporation automobile divisions that were assembled here were:

- Plymouth 1929–1964, 1979–1980
- DeSoto 1929–1933
- Fargo Truck 1929–1930

Automobiles models assembled here include:

- Plymouth Belvedere 1964–1978
- Plymouth Satellite 1964–1974
- Dodge Coronet 1964–1978
- Dodge Charger 1965–1966
- Dodge Charger 1971–1974
- Chrysler R-series full-size sedans (Newport/New Yorker/Fifth Avenue/St. Regis/Gran Fury), 1979-1981

== See also ==
- List of Chrysler factories
