= Dodge Dynasty =

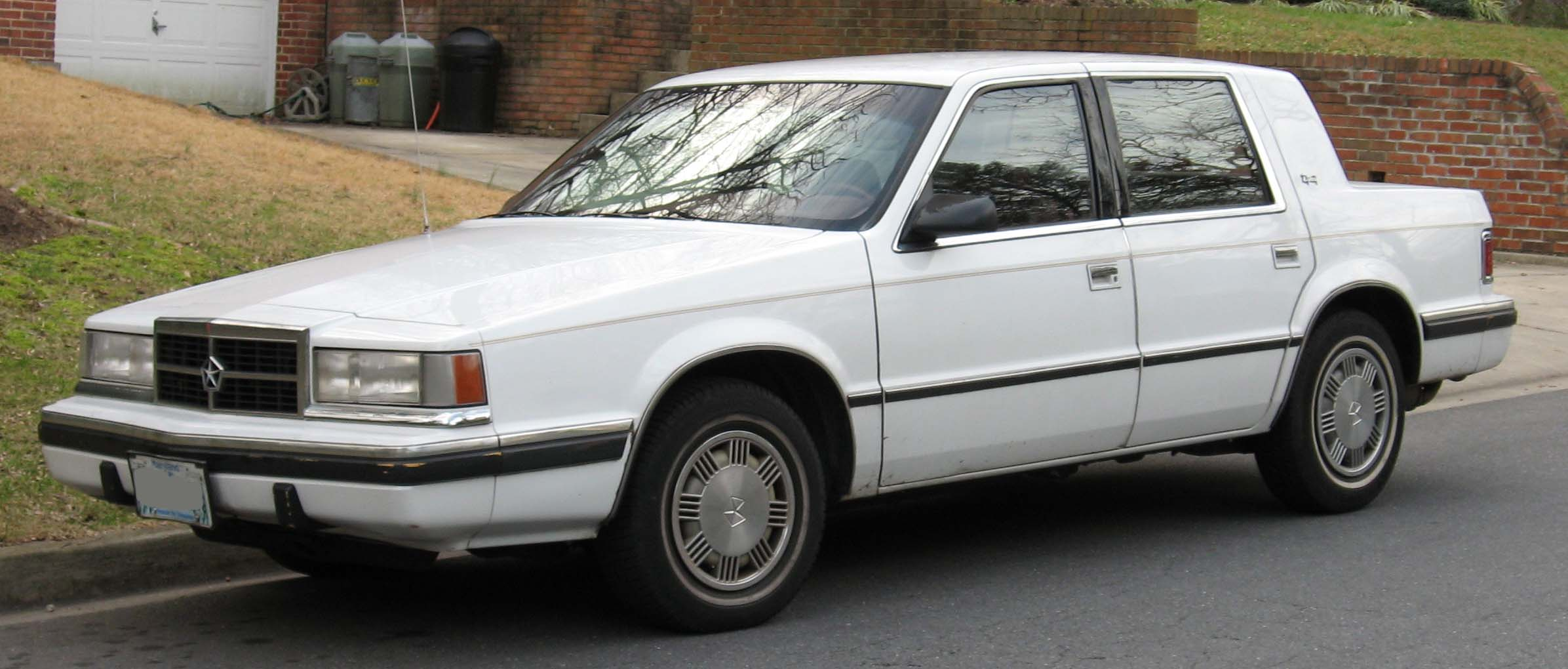

Overview
- Manufacturer: Chrysler Corporation
- Also called: Chrysler Dynasty (Canada and Mexico)
- Production: 1987–1993
- Model years: 1988–1993
- Assembly: United States: Belvidere, Illinois (Belvidere Assembly Plant)

Body and chassis
- Class: Midsize car
- Body style: 4-door sedan
- Layout: Transverse front-engine, front-wheel drive
- Platform: C-body
- Related: Chrysler New Yorker

Powertrain
- Engine: 2.5 L K I4; 3.0 L Mitsubishi 6G72 V6; 3.3 L EGA V6
- Transmission: 3-speed A413 automatic; 3-speed A670 automatic; 4-speed A604 automatic

Dimensions
- Wheelbase: 1988–1990: 104.3 in (2,649 mm); 1991–1993: 104.5 in (2,654 mm)
- Length: 192.0 in (4,877 mm)
- Width: 1988–1990: 68.5 in (1,740 mm); 1991–1993: 68.9 in (1,750 mm)
- Height: 1988–1990: 53.5 in (1,359 mm); 1991–1993: 53.6 in (1,361 mm)
- Curb weight: 2,998 lb (1,360 kg)

Chronology
- Predecessor: Dodge 600
- Successor: Dodge Intrepid; Dodge Stratus

The Dodge Dynasty is a mid-size four-door sedan that was marketed by Dodge from the 1988 to 1993 model years. Serving as the direct successor of the Dodge 600 sedan and the Dodge Diplomat, the Dynasty was slotted between the Dodge Spirit and Dodge Monaco in the Dodge sedan line.

One of the largest Chrysler K-car variants, the Dynasty used the front-wheel drive Chrysler C/AC platform, sharing its body with the 1988–1993 Chrysler New Yorker. The platform served as the basis for the Chrysler Y platform (the longest-wheelbase sedan variant of the K-car), the basis of the Chrysler New Yorker Fifth Avenue and Chrysler Imperial.

Chrysler assembled the Dodge Dynasty at its Belvidere Assembly Plant facility (Belvidere, Illinois) alongside the Chrysler New Yorker, New Yorker Fifth Avenue, and Imperial. The final vehicle was produced on May 28, 1993. For the 1993 model year, Dodge introduced the Dodge Intrepid as its largest sedan, replacing the Dynasty and the Monaco with a single model line.

== Background ==
Following the introduction of the Ford Taurus and Mercury Sable for 1986, Chrysler commenced development of a Dodge mid-size sedan that would not only replace the Dodge 600, but serving as a successor of the Dodge Diplomat. While intended to rival the Taurus in overall function (including size), Chrysler sought to appeal to buyers interested in traditional model design and were alienated by the Taurus/Sable. In a major risk, the Dynasty was developed for older buyers than the Taurus or the GM W-body lines.

Though the body of the Dynasty shared little more than the Chrysler Pentastar badging with its 600 predecessor, its platform was again K car-derived; to reduce engineering costs, the new chassis retained the same width as both the 600 and the Aries. Though nearly a foot narrower than the Chevrolet Caprice and Ford LTD Crown Victoria, the Dynasty was designated as a full-size car on the basis of its interior volume.

To assemble the model line, Chrysler launched a $367 million retooling of the Belvidere Assembly facility in 1987, shifting production of the Dodge Omni and Plymouth Horizon to Kenosha, Wisconsin.

=== Nameplate origin ===
The Dodge Dynasty nameplate is derived from the long-running Chrysler tradition of using model names associated with prestige, wealth, and royalty. At the time of its launch, the Dynasty nameplate was also the namesake of a 1980s primetime soap opera (which was associated with the wealthy family of an oil tycoon). In terms of its prestige association, the Dynasty name came in line with the Diplomat and Monaco alongside its Chrysler New Yorker counterpart.

== Model overview ==
1988 Dodge Dynasty (standard trim)

=== Chassis ===
The Dodge Dynasty uses the front-wheel drive Chrysler C platform (AC from 1989) on a 104.3 inch wheelbase. In a first for American cars, the front MacPherson struts were designed with variable compression rates (firming up spring rates as the wheel moves to the top of its suspension travel); the rear suspension was a coil-sprung rear axle with semi-trailing arms. Fitted with standard front disc/rear drum brakes, the model was available with optional anti-lock brakes (ABS), which used four-wheel disc brakes.

==== Powertrain details ====
The Dodge Dynasty was offered with three engines during its production, including a standard 2.5 L inline-4 (offered only with base-trim vehicles). Shared with Chrysler minivans, a Mitsubishi 3.0 L V6 was an option; a 3.3 L V6 was introduced for 1990 as a second engine option.

For 1988, both the 2.5 L and 3.0 L engines were paired with a 3-speed automatic transmission (TorqueFlite A413). For 1989, the V6 was paired with a standard 4-speed automatic (Ultradrive A604), which was fitted to the 3.3 L V6 (introduced for 1990).

Dodge Dynasty powertrain details
Engine name	Production	Configuration	Output (SAE net)		Transmission	Notes
Engine name	Production	Configuration	Horsepower	Torque	Transmission	Notes
Chrysler K I4	1988–1993	2.5 L (153 cu in) SOHC I4	100 hp (75 kW) @ 4800 RPM	135 lb⋅ft (183 N⋅m) @ 2800 RPM	Chrysler A413 3-speed automatic	Standard engine for base-trim Dynasty Not offered in Mexico
Mitsubishi 6G72 V6	1988–1993	3.0 L (181 cu in) SOHC V6	141 hp (105 kW) @ 5000 RPM	171 lb⋅ft (232 N⋅m) @ 2800 RPM	Chrysler A670 3-speed automatic Chrysler A604 4-speed automatic	Standard engine for Dynasty LE; optional on base-trim Dynasty Ultradrive 4-speed automatic used from 1989–1993
Chrysler EGA V6	1990–1993	3.3 L (201 cu in) OHV V6	147 hp (110 kW) @ 4800 RPM	183 lb⋅ft (248 N⋅m) @ 3600 RPM	Chrysler A604 4-speed automatic	Optional on Dynasty LE 1990–1993; paired only with Ultradrive 4-speed automatic

In 1992, Chrysler fitted several prototypes with its 3.8 L V6 engine in its development of a police-car variant of the Dynasty. Shared with the Fifth Avenue and Imperial, the 162 hp engine powered the Dynasty to compete well against V8-powered Fords and Chevrolets. The project was not pursued further, as Chrysler was concentrating on the release of the Dodge Intrepid.

=== Body ===
Sharing much of its body with the Chrysler New Yorker, the Dodge Dynasty was distinguished by its straight-edged styling and a nearly-vertical rear window. Though sold exclusively as a four-door sedan, the Dynasty derived its roofline design from the two-door Dodge Aries. Contrasting with the New Yorker, the Dynasty was fitted with composite headlamps, a crosshair-style grille with a Pentastar (in place of a hood ornament), and full-width taillamps (giving the Dynasty a higher-sill trunk opening than the New Yorker). Though far different in appearance from the Ford Taurus, the Dynasty adopted several of its aerodynamic upgrades, including doors wrapping into the roofline, flush-mounted window glass, and clear-lens composite headlamps.

At 99 cubic feet, the interior of the Dynasty matched the M-body sedans in volume (only 1 cubic foot less than the Taurus); at 17 cubic feet, the Dynasty used a larger trunk than the Diplomat. Differing from the New Yorker primarily in trim fitment, the Dynasty was fitted exclusively with a 6-passenger interior; higher-trim versions were fitted with a 50/50 split bench. The Electronic Voice Alert system was discontinued, with Chrysler replacing the audio-supported design with a dashboard-mounted message center. The model line shared a number of interior components with other Chrysler lines, including its radio, switchgear, and steering column; the analog instrument cluster was shared with the base-trim New Yorker.

=== Trim ===
Through its production, the model line was offered as the standard-trim Dynasty and the upgraded Dynasty LE; in following with Dodge Diplomat rather than the Spirit and 600, no ES trim was offered. For 1992, the Dynasty LE trim was expanded by a Brougham option (adding the partial vinyl roof of the New Yorker Landau). The standard trim offered power windows, door locks, and sideview mirrors as an option (along with air conditioning); the interior was fitted with a full-width bench seat. Internally distinguished by its 50/50 split bench seat, the Dynasty LE standardized power equipment (with speed-sensitive automatic door locks introduced for the model line), along with offering multiple features from the New Yorker, such as optional power front seats, sunroof, and upgraded radio.

== Model history ==
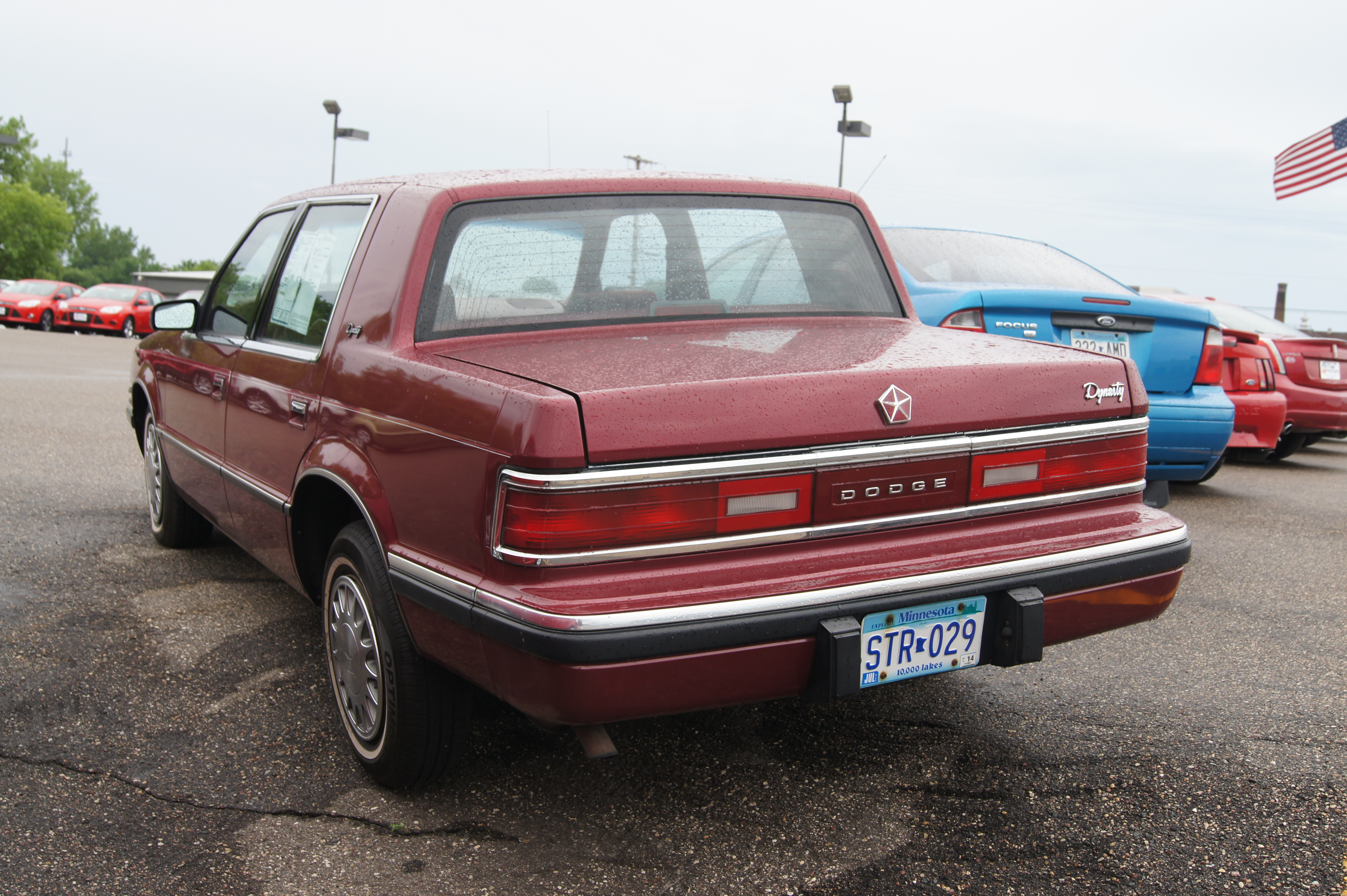
Top row: 1991 Dodge Dynasty LE
Bottom row: 1993 Dodge Dynasty LE

=== 1988-1991 ===
For 1988, the Dynasty was slotted between the 600 (in its final model year) and the Diplomat; the model shared the C platform with the Chrysler New Yorker and New Yorker Landau. In contrast with both of its predecessors, the Dynasty had no Plymouth divisional counterpart. For 1989, the 3.0 L V6 engine adopted the 4-speed Ultradrive transaxle. In a minor revision, the fixed headrests were deleted from the rear seat of the Dynasty LE.

For 1990, the Dynasty became slotted below the Monaco in size. Coinciding with several safety upgrades, the interior underwent a minor revision. In compliance with federal regulation updates, the rear seats were fitted with 3-point outboard seatbelts; LE-trim vehicles saw the introduction of optional leather-upholstered seats. The dashboard was restyled, featuring a rounder-edged surround to the instrument panel; the steering wheel was redesigned as a driver-side airbag became standard. The Dynasty LE gained the 3.3 L V6 as an option (paired with Ultradrive). In a slight change, the cornering lamps were deleted from the standard-trim Dynasty.

For 1991, keyless entry was introduced as an option, paired with an onboard security system.

=== 1992-1993 ===
In contrast with the New Yorker, Fifth Avenue, and Imperial, the Dynasty was not restyled for 1992, maintaining its exterior design from 1988; cornering lamps were dropped from the Dynasty LE. 1993 was largely carryover, with the Dynasty adding a stainless-steel exhaust system; the dashboard was refitted with a tamper-proof odometer.

== Production ==
Dodge Dynasty Production Figures	Yearly Total
1988	55,550
1989	115,623
1990	94,683
1991	112,438
1992	85,238
1993	58,402
Total	521,934

== Chrysler New Yorker Salon (1990-1993) ==
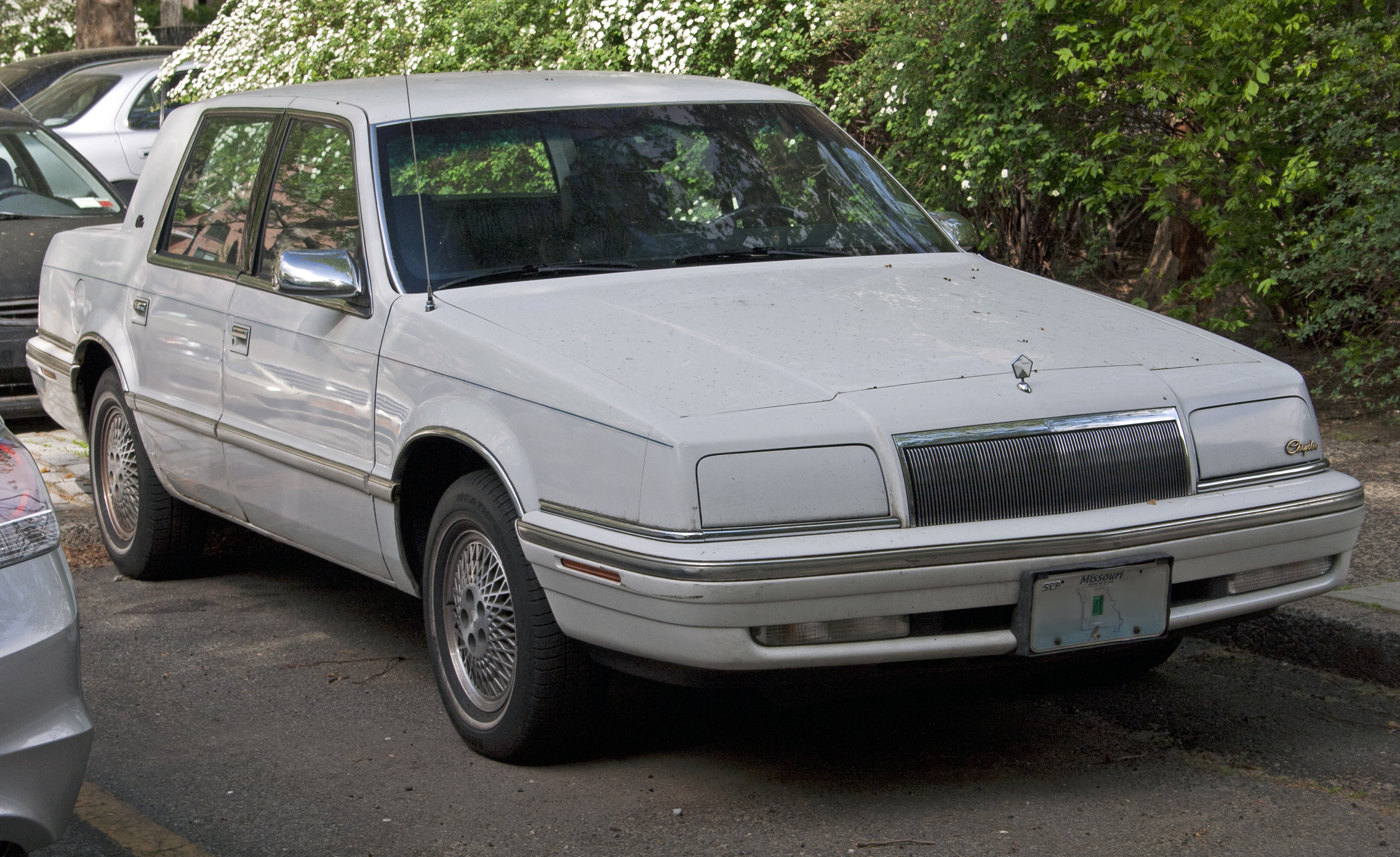
1992–1993 Chrysler New Yorker Salon (second facelift)

For 1990, Chrysler introduced a divisional counterpart of the Dynasty, replacing the standard-trim New Yorker with the New Yorker Salon. Taking its name from the highest trim of the Plymouth Gran Fury, the Salon was equipped and trimmed similar to the Dodge Dynasty LE. The body was styled nearly identically to the Chrysler Dynasty (though retaining the body-color door moldings of the New Yorker Landau), including its exposed headlamps and lack of hood ornament.

The model underwent several revisions as Chrysler sought to distinguish it from its Dodge counterpart. For 1991, the Salon replaced the Landau as the AC platform New Yorker and adopted its front and rear fascia designs. For 1992, the Salon adopted the facelift of the New Yorker Fifth Avenue (including its revised front fascia and rounded taillamps). For 1993, the Salon was refitted with the interior of the previous Landau, sharing only its roofline with the Dynasty.

== Outside the United States ==
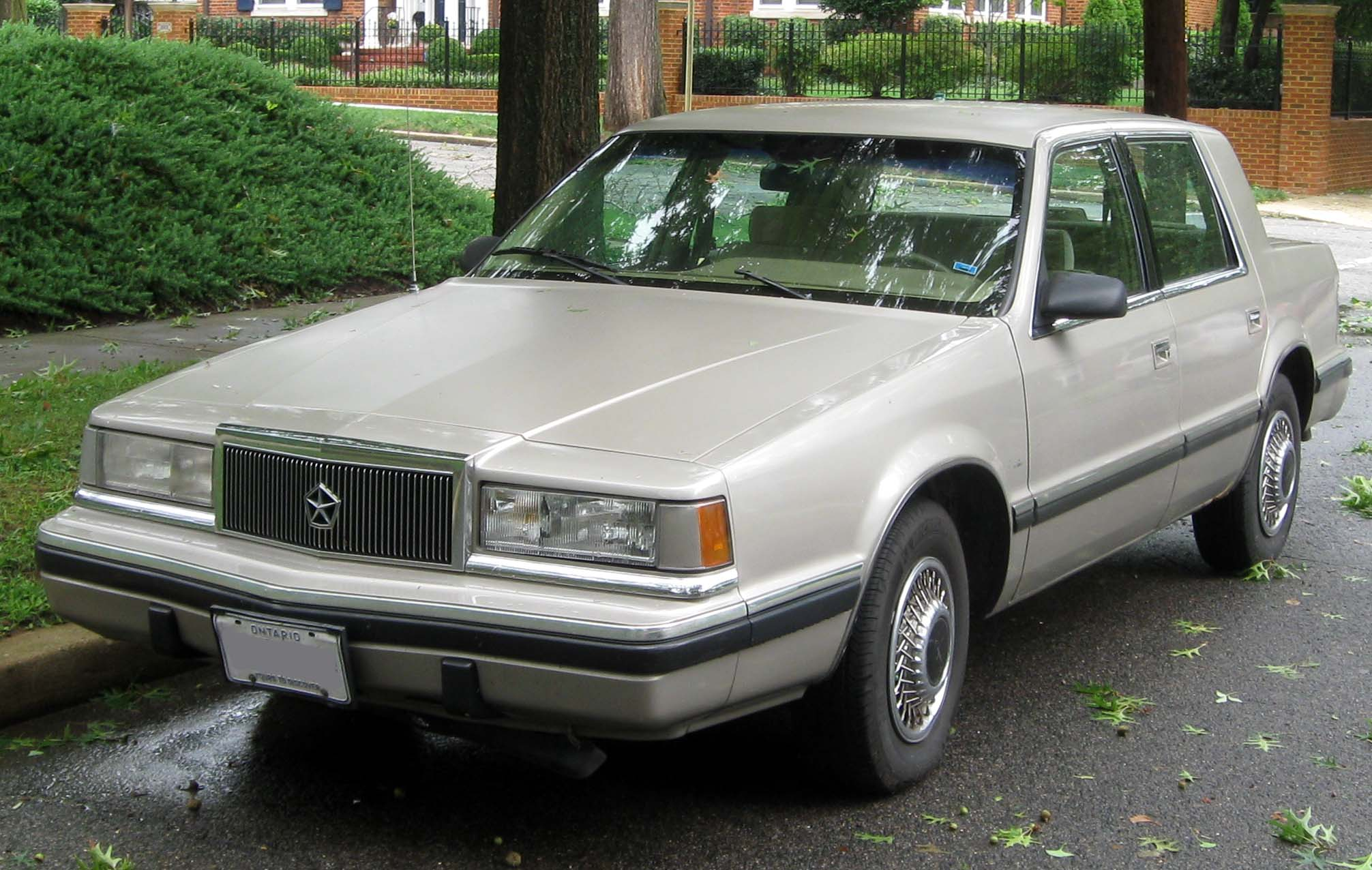
Chrysler Dynasty (Canada)

=== Canada ===
In Canada, the Dynasty was marketed as a Chrysler because Dodge replaced the 600 with the Spirit in Canada. As Chrysler Canada did not market the Dodge Monaco, the Chrysler Dynasty was its largest sedan, serving as the replacement for both the Diplomat and Caravelle Salon. In Canada, the Chrysler Dynasty was fitted with a waterfall-style grille, moving the Pentastar emblem from the hood ornament to the grille. In the United States, the Chrysler Dynasty served as the basis for the 1990 Chrysler New Yorker Salon.

=== Mexico ===
In Mexico, Chrysler de Mexico had shifted Dodge towards a truck-only lineup at the end of the 1980s. Serving as the largest car sold by Chrysler, the Mexican Chrysler Dynasty replaced the Chrysler LeBaron GTS (the M platform was dropped after 1982 in Mexico). In contrast with Canada and the United States, Chrysler de Mexico sold the Dynasty exclusively with V6 engines.
