= Chrysler C platform =

Type of automobile platform produced by Chrysler

Chrysler's C platform was the basis for rear wheel drive full-size cars from 1965 to 1978. Although often misclassified, 1964 and earlier full-size Chrysler products, and 1966 and earlier Imperials are not C-bodies.

== History ==
C-bodies were built between 1965 and 1978. They had wheelbases ranging from 119 to 124 inches, they were generally loaded with features, and all C-Body cars used a torsion bar front suspension design.

In 1969, Chrysler redesigned the C-Body platform to incorporate its new "Fuselage" styling that brought the upper and lower sections of body into one uniformly shaped design, in turn changing the look of all the models. This new C-Body design saw Chrysler ditching the last stylistic remnants of the early-to-mid 1960s in favor of a more contemporary silhouette. These emphasized luxury over performance.

However, due to economic turmoil and an auto industry reeling from a one-two punch of federal regulation and skyrocketing gas prices, Chrysler's sales dipped and production ended in 1978.

== Wheelbases ==
- 119 in
  - 1965–1968 Plymouths (except wagons)

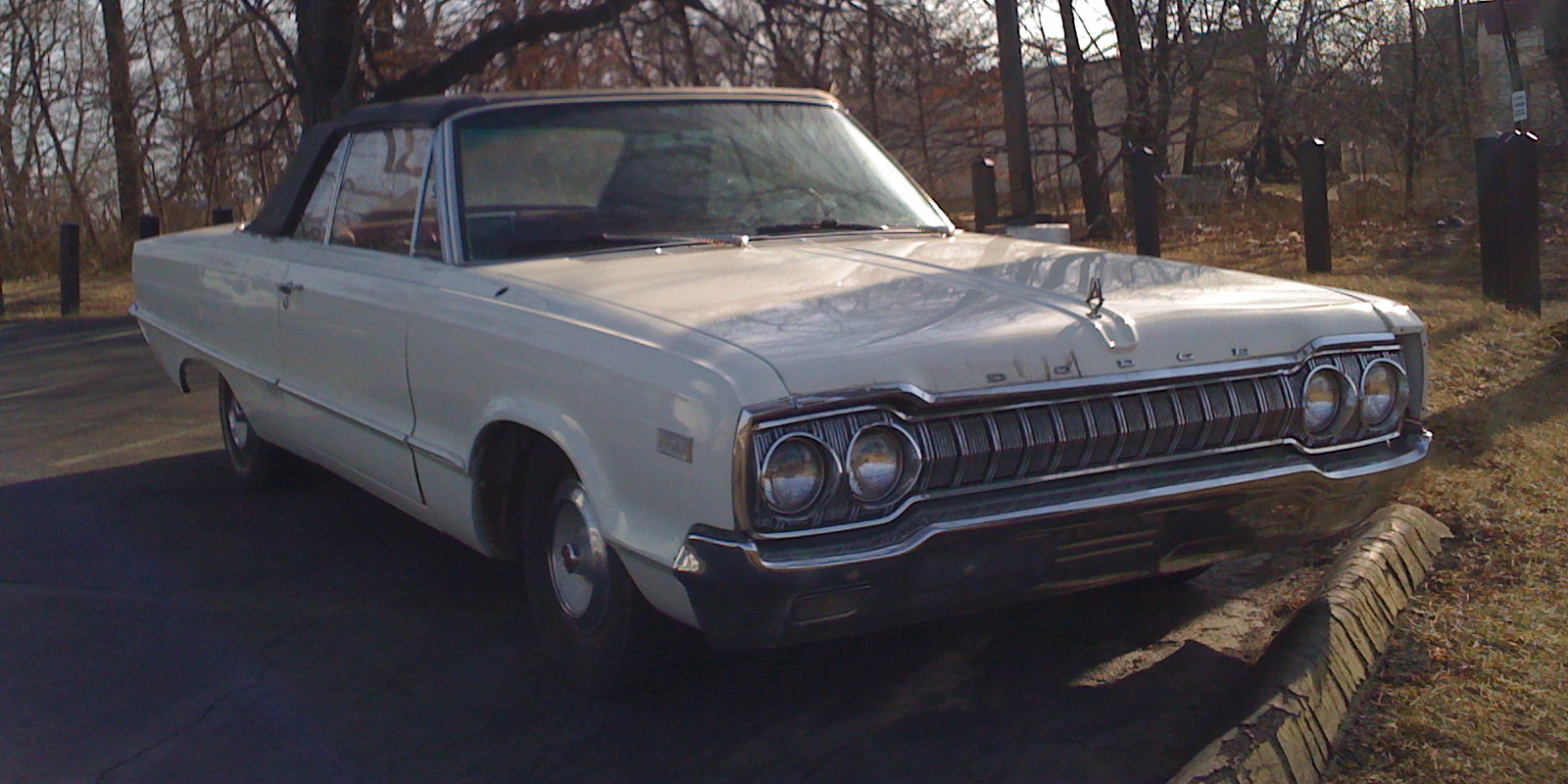
1965 C-Body Polara

- 121 in
  - 1965–1966 Plymouth wagons
  - 1965–1966 Dodge Monaco sedan
  - 1965–1966 Dodge Polara sedan
  - 1965–1966 Chrysler wagons
- 121.5 in
  - 1975–1977 Plymouth Gran Fury (except wagons)
  - 1974–1977 Dodge Monaco (except wagons)
- 122 in
  - 1967–1973 Plymouth wagons
  - 1974 Plymouth Fury III/Gran Fury
  - 1967–1973 Dodge Monaco sedan
  - 1967–1973 Dodge Polara sedan
  - 1967–1973 Chrysler Town & Country
- 120 in
  - 1969–1974 Plymouth Fury (except wagons)
- 124 in
  - 1974–1977 Plymouth and Dodge wagons
  - 1965–1971 Chrysler 300
  - 1965–1978 Chrysler New Yorker sedans
  - 1965–1978 Chrysler Newport
  - 1974–1978 Chrysler Town & Country
  - 1974–1975 Imperials
- 127 in
  - 1967–1973 Imperials

== 1988 ==
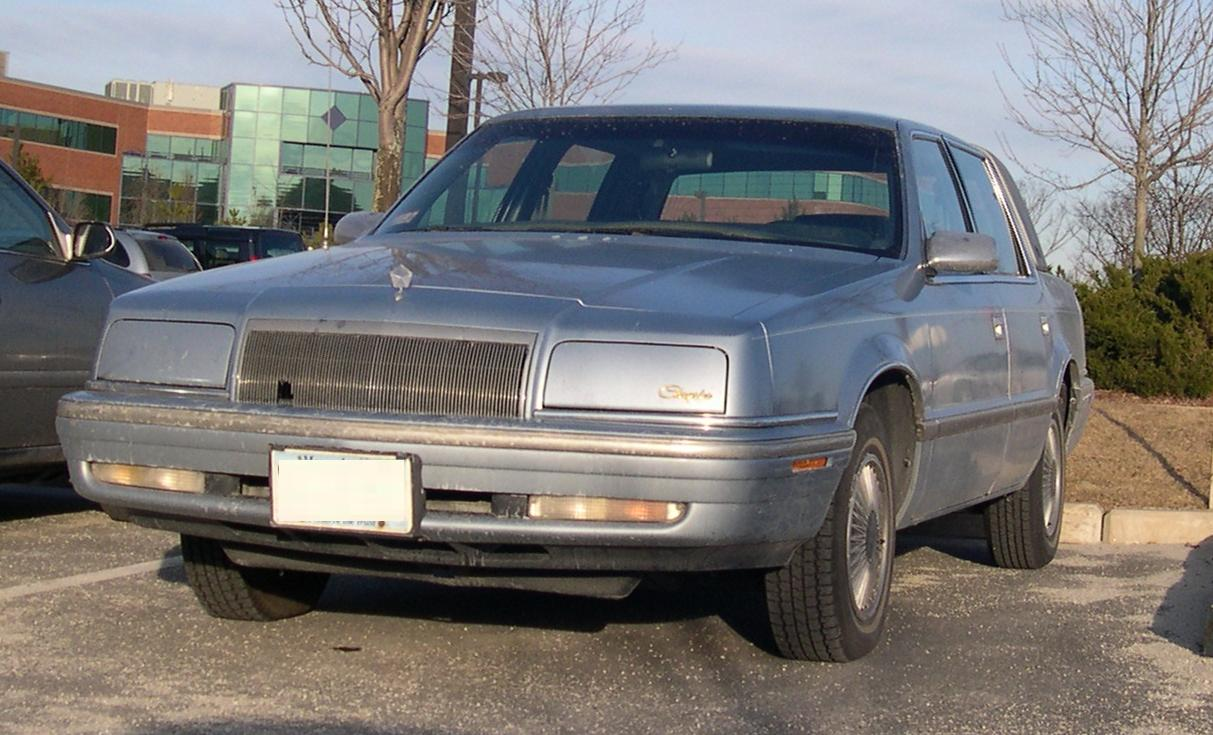
1990–1993 C-body New Yorker

The "C" name was revived as the basis of Chrysler's new K-based mid-size front wheel drive cars.

Cars that used the front wheel drive C:

- 1988–1993 Chrysler New Yorker
- 1988–1993 Dodge Dynasty

== See also ==
- Chrysler platforms
