= Dodge Monaco =

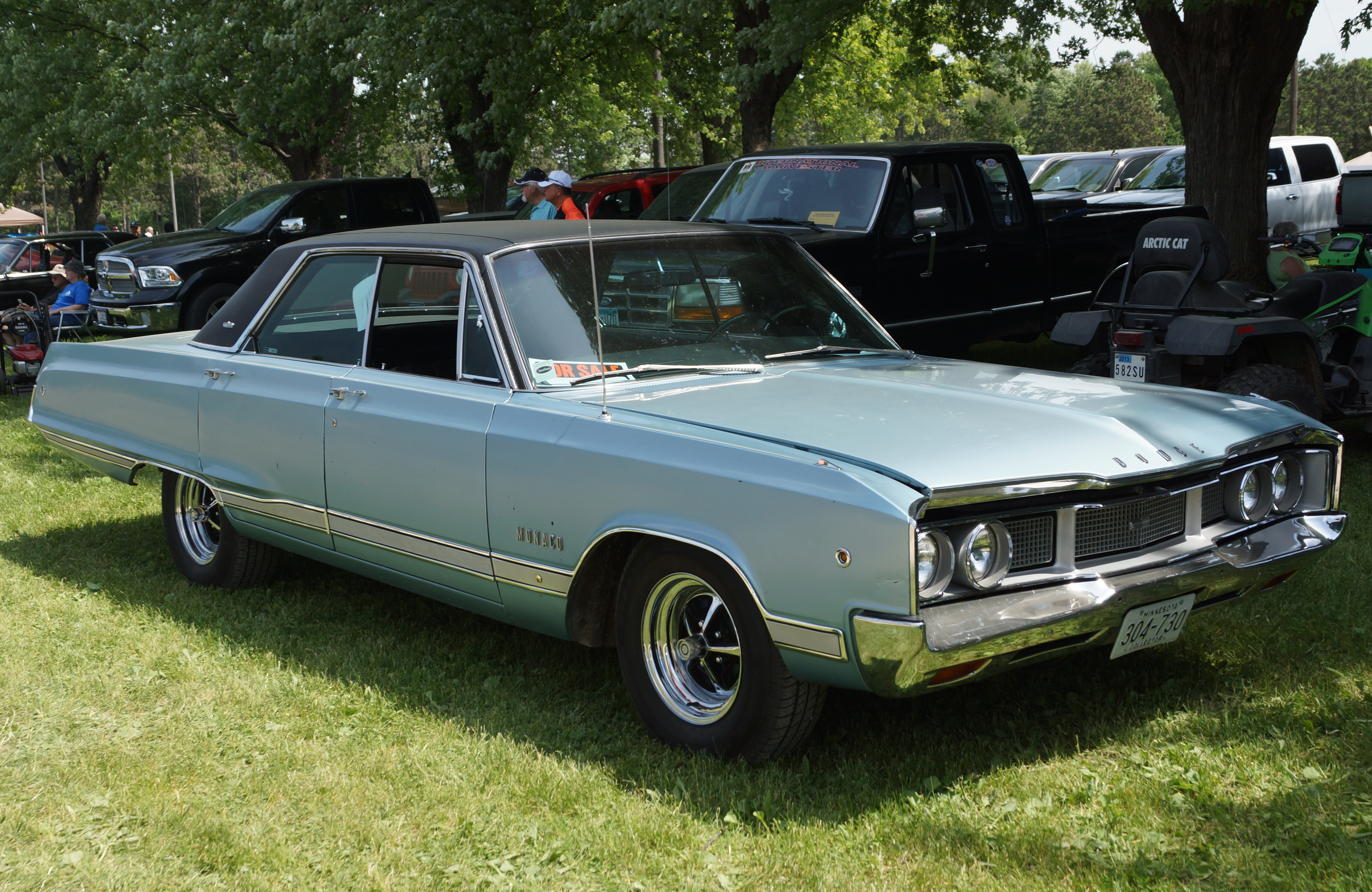
- 1968 Dodge Monaco four-door hardtop

Overview
- Manufacturer: Dodge (Chrysler)
- Model years: 1965–1977 (full-size); 1977–1978 (intermediate); 1990–1992 (full-size)

Body and chassis
- Related: Dodge Polara

Chronology
- Predecessor: Full-size: Dodge 880 (1965); Intermediate: Dodge Coronet (1976); 5th-Gen: Dodge Diplomat (1982–1989)
- Successor: Full-size: Dodge St. Regis (1979–1981); 5th-Gen: Dodge Intrepid (1993)

The Dodge Monaco or Royal Monaco is an automobile that was marketed by the Dodge division of Chrysler Corporation.

It was introduced for the 1965 model year as the flagship of the full-sized Dodge product line, replacing the Custom 880. The Monaco later became a sub-model of the Dodge Polara.

During its production, the Monaco was offered in several body configurations, including two-door and four-door hardtop sedans, four-door sedans, two-door convertibles, and station wagons.

From 1965 through 1977, three generations of the Monaco were produced using the full-size Chrysler C platform.

For 1977 and 1978, Dodge shifted the Monaco to the intermediate Chrysler B platform, effectively downsizing the model line.

For 1979, the model line was redesigned and renamed the Dodge St. Regis.

After a twelve-year hiatus, the full-size Monaco was revived for the 1990 model year as the flagship Dodge sedan, replacing the Diplomat. This model was a rebadged version of the Eagle Premier, which was developed by Renault and American Motors Corporation (AMC).

The Dodge Intrepid replaced the Monaco for the 1993 model year.

The cars are named after the Principality of Monaco.

== First generation (1965–1968) ==
First generation
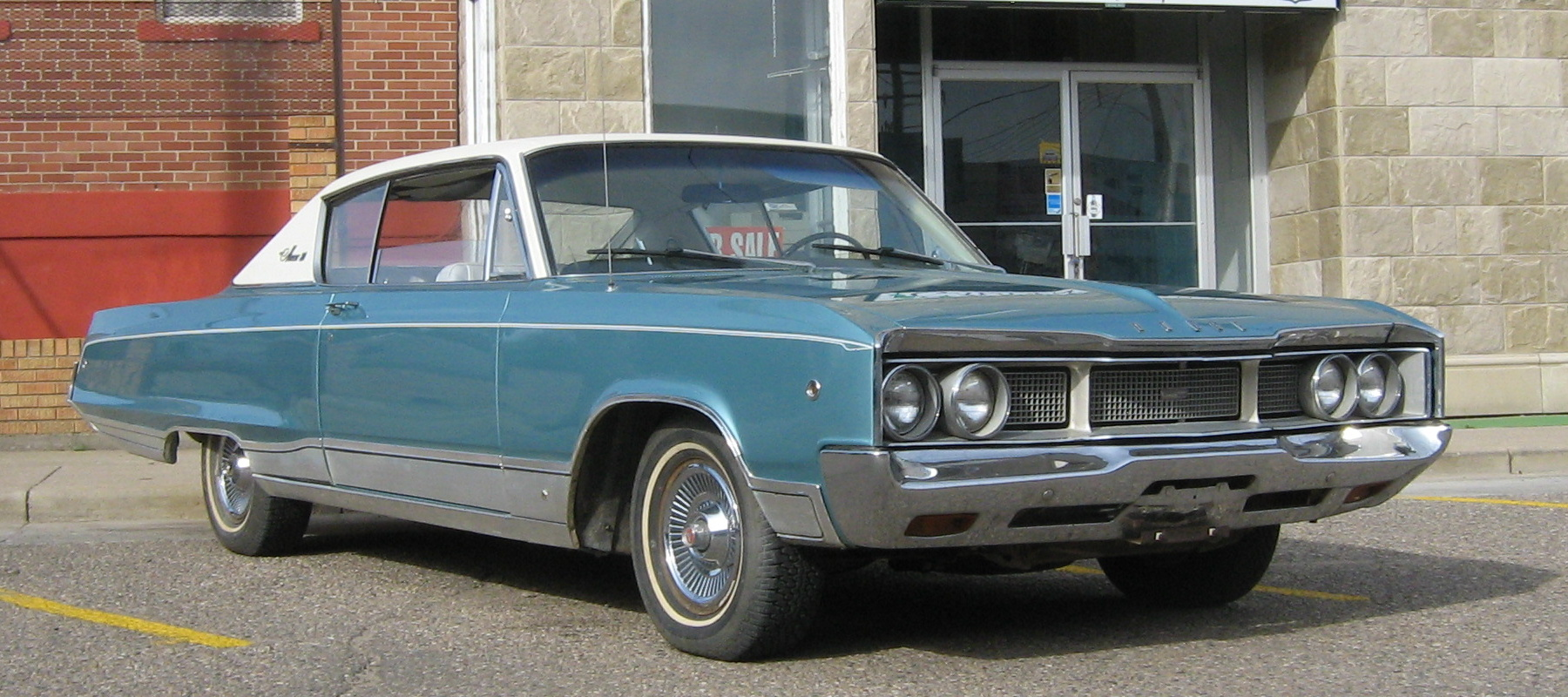
- 1968 Dodge Monaco 500 2-door hardtop

Overview
- Production: 1964–1968
- Model years: 1965–1968
- Assembly: United States: Hamtramck, Michigan (Dodge Main Factory)

Body and chassis
- Class: Full-size
- Body style: 4-door station wagon 4-door sedan 4-door hardtop 2-door hardtop 2-door convertible (Canada)
- Layout: FR layout
- Platform: C-body

Powertrain
- Engine: 225 cu in (3.7 L) RG I6 (Canada); 318 cu in (5.2 L) A V8 (Canada); 383 cu in (6.3 L) B V8; 440 cu in (7.2 L) RB V8
- Transmission: 3-speed manual 4-speed manual 3-speed automatic

Dimensions
- Wheelbase: 121 in (3,100 mm)
- Length: 213.3 in (5,420 mm)
- Width: 80 in (2,000 mm)
- Height: 56.4 in (1,430 mm)

Chronology
- Predecessor: Dodge 880 (for 1965)

=== 1965 ===
Upon its introduction on September 25, 1964, for the 1965 model year, the Dodge Monaco was intended to compete with the Pontiac Grand Prix in what came to be known as the personal luxury market. The new model was based on the Custom 880 two-door hardtop body.

The Monaco received special badging and a sportier interior with a full-length center console, as well as a 383 cu in (6.3 L), 325 hp (330 PS; 242 kW) V8 engine as standard equipment. Transmissions were the Torqueflite automatic or a four-speed manual, both with console-mounted shifters. In an attempt to emulate the halo effect of the Grand Prix for the Pontiac line, the new Monaco was marketed as the "Limited Edition Dodge for the Man with Unlimited Taste".

The Monaco's exterior featured a distinctive rear end design, front fender-mounted turn indicators, wheel covers with simulated knock-off centers, and the bodysides only had a slim full-length molding and a ribbed rocker-panel trim. The interior of the Monaco received special attention from the designers with standard buckets seats in the front and rear, a rear package tray contoured with the tops of the individual rear seat-backs, unusual rattan wicker accents on the door and quarter panels, and a unique three-spoke steering wheel.

The Monaco two-door competed with similar "sporty" models such as Chrysler 300 non-letter series, Oldsmobile Starfire, Buick Wildcat, and Mercury S-55, as well as top-of-the-line full-sized models: the LTD in the Ford Galaxie series; the Chevrolet Caprice; the VIP in the Plymouth Fury series; and the Ambassador 990-H and DPL hardtops offered by American Motors Corporation (AMC).

Compared to the marketing goal of replicating the success of the Pontiac Grand Prix, the lower pricing was in the Monaco's favor, but its front-end design was similar to the lower-priced Dodge Polara models. After one model year, the Monaco became the full-size, luxury line for Dodge.

In Canada, a version of the Plymouth Sport Fury was marketed as the Dodge Monaco. It was available in hardtop coupe or convertible body styles. The Canadian Monacos were equipped with Plymouth dashboards in 1965 and 1966. Unlike the U.S. Monaco versions, the Canadian Monacos were available with 318 cu in (5.2 L) V8 or the slant six.

=== 1966 ===
For the 1966 model year, in the U.S., the Monaco replaced the Custom 880 series, and the former Monaco became the Monaco 500. The basic Monaco was available in hardtop coupe, four-door (pillarless) hardtop sedan, conventional four-door (pillared) sedan, and four-door station wagon body styles. In the U.S., the Monaco 500 was available only as a two-door hardtop. Although there was no convertible in the 1966 U.S. Monaco range, there was in the 1966 Canadian Monaco lineup. The Canadian Dodge used the "Monaco" name for the Sport Fury equivalent and the Polara 880 for the Fury III competitor.

=== 1967 ===
The 1967 model-year full-sized Dodges, including the Monaco, received significant facelifts with all-new exterior sheet metal. Chief designer Elwood Engel's work featured generally flat body planes with sharp-edged accent lines. The hardtop coupes featured new semi-fastback rooflines with reverse-slanted trailing edges on the rear quarter windows.

In Canada, the "Monaco" name was applied for 1967 to all of the premium full-sized Dodge cars, replacing the Polara 880 at the top of the Dodge line. Taking the Monaco's place as a premium full-size model was the Monaco 500, which was available only as a two-door hardtop and convertible.

=== 1968 ===
Marker lights in the fenders and full-width tail lights were added. The Monaco 500 was dropped at the end of the 1968 model year in the United States and at the end of the 1970 model year in Canada.

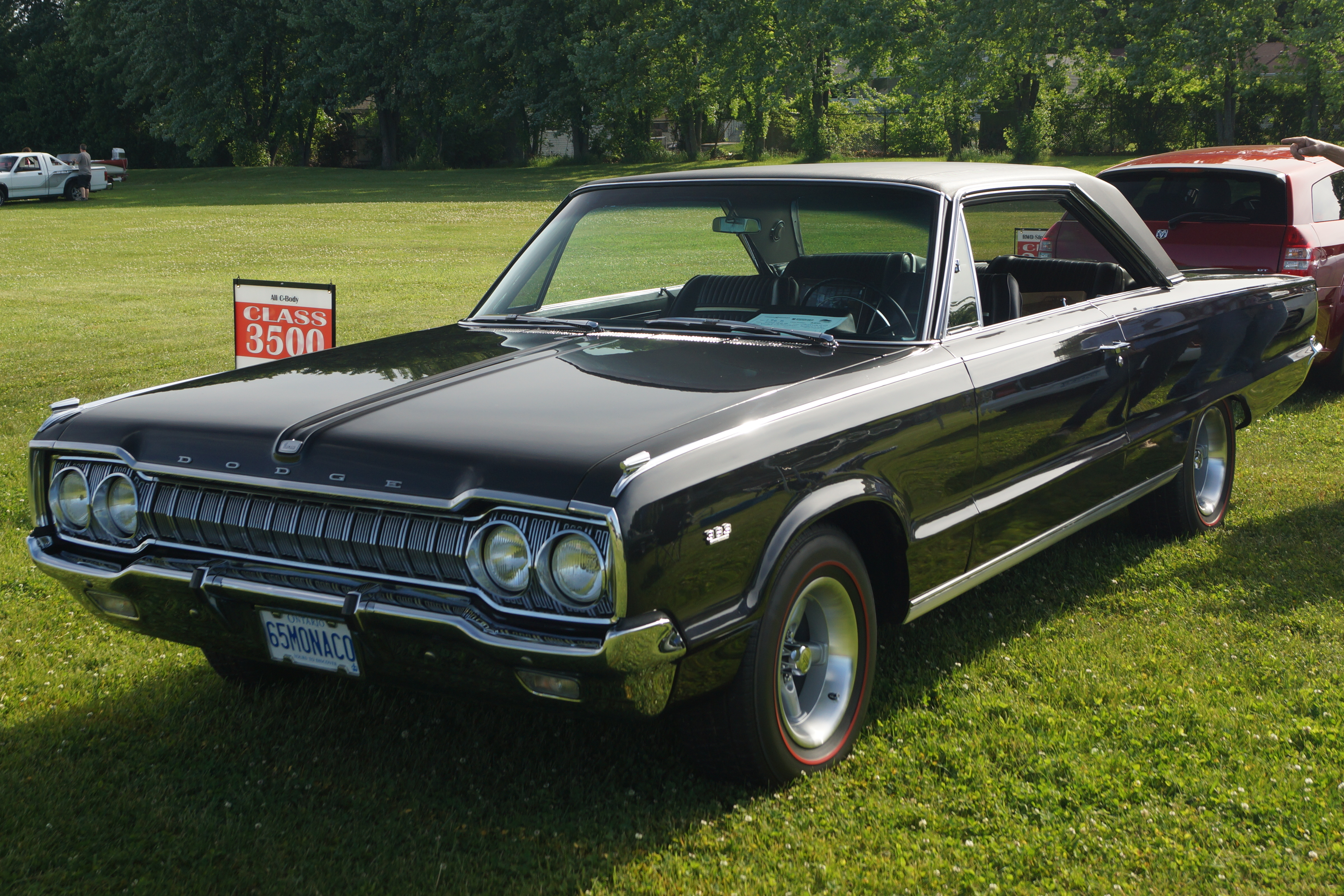
1965 Dodge Monaco 2-door hardtop

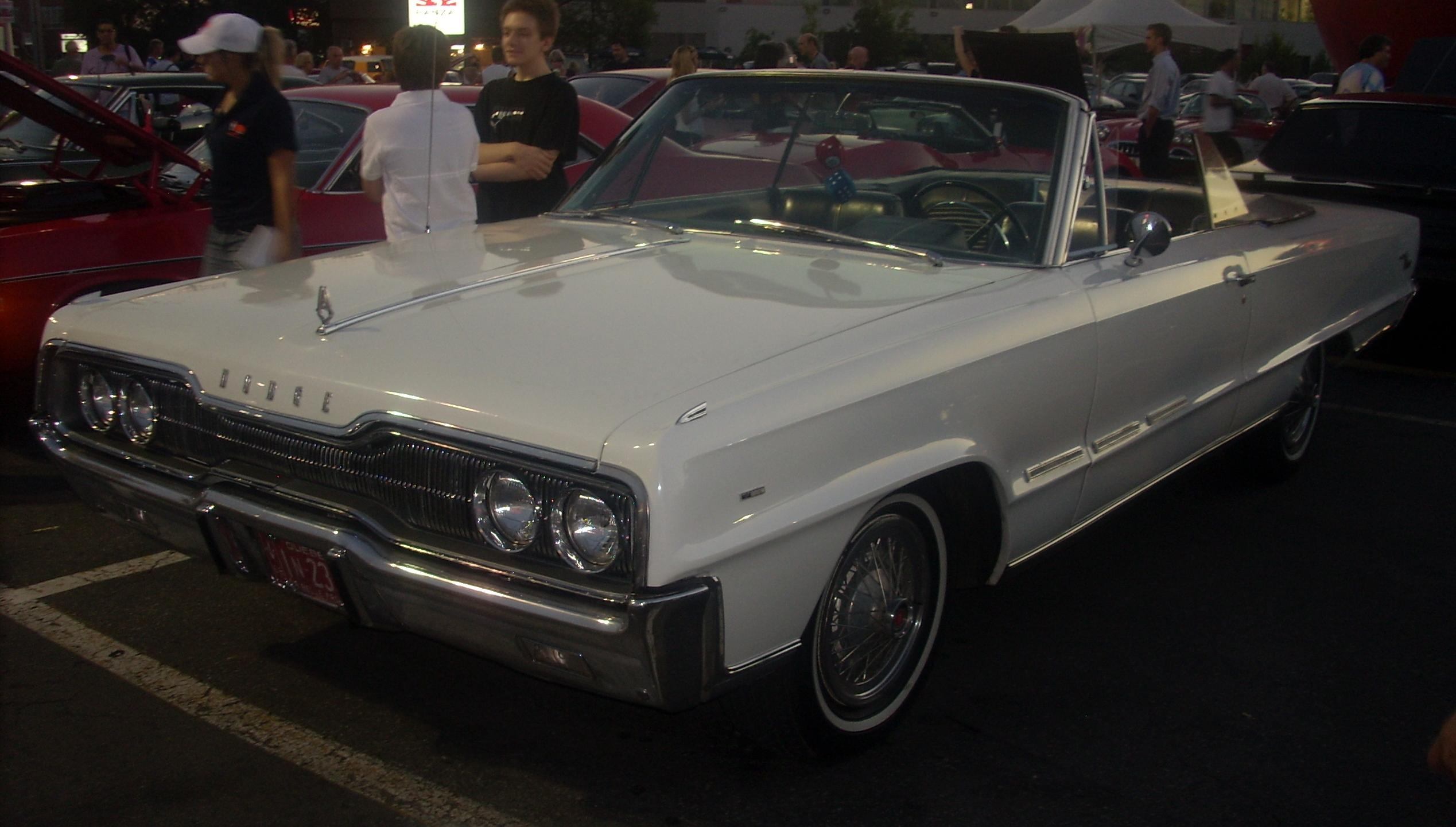
1966 Dodge Monaco 500 convertible (Canadian market only)

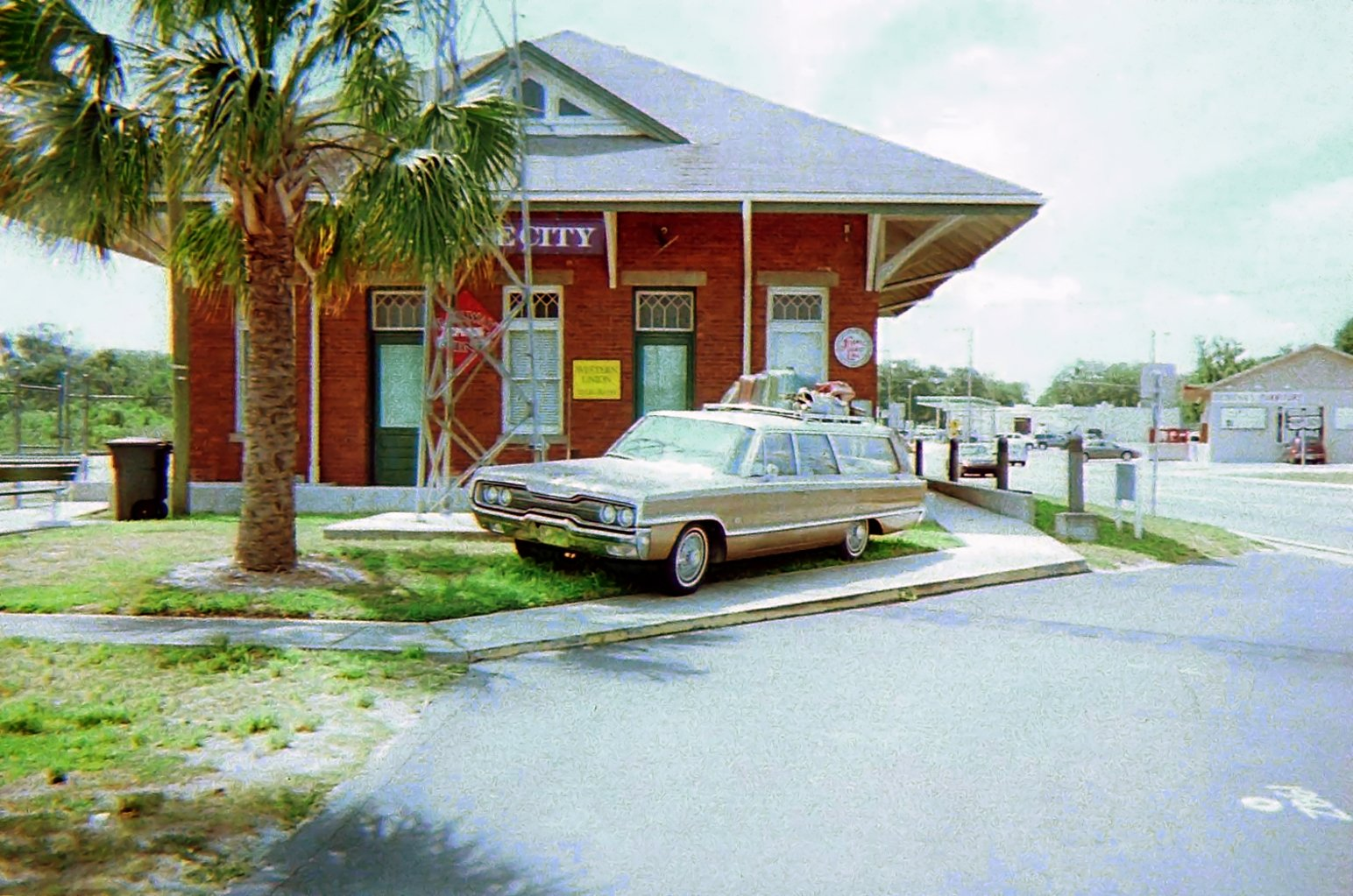
1966 Dodge Monaco station wagon

== Second generation (1969–1973) ==
Second generation
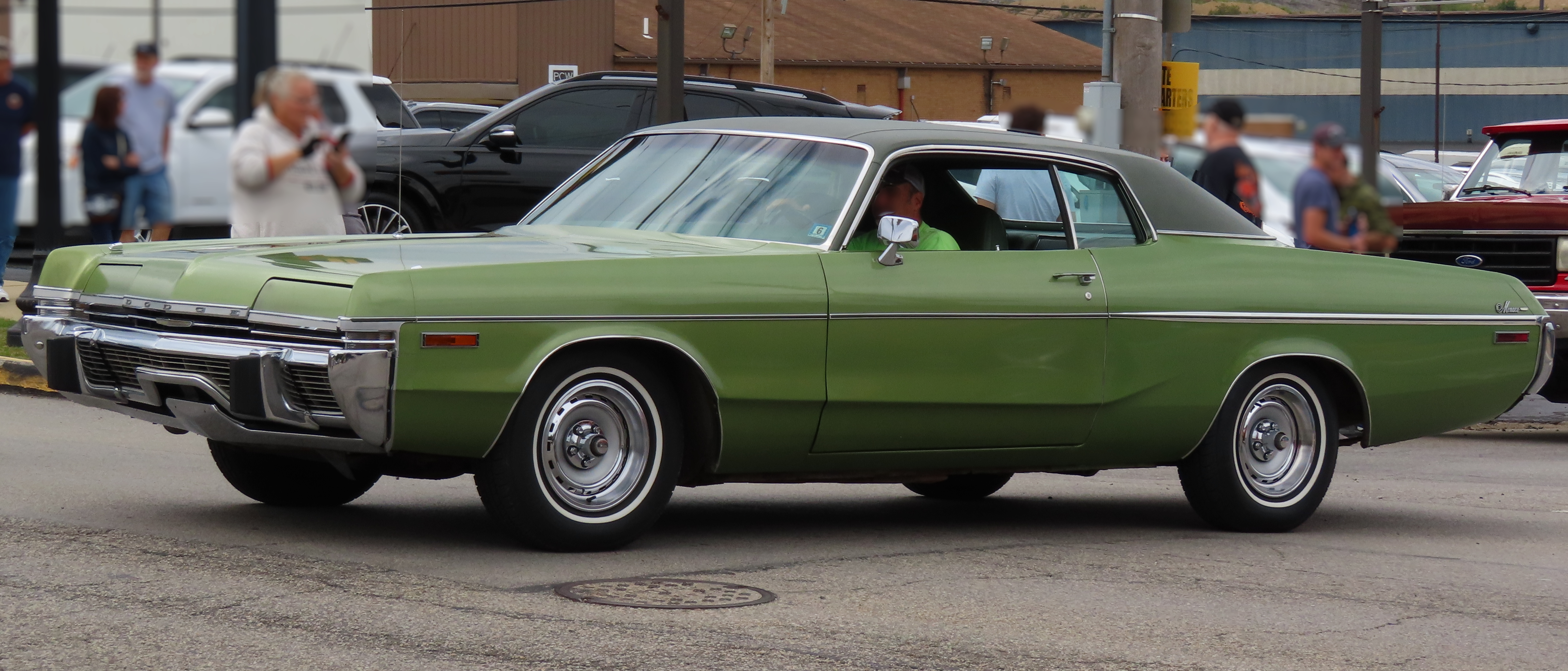
- 1973 Dodge Monaco 2-door hardtop

Overview
- Also called: Chrysler 383 (South Africa)
- Production: 1968–1973
- Model years: 1969–1973
- Assembly: United States: Hamtramck, Michigan (Dodge Main Factory)

Body and chassis
- Class: Full-size
- Body style: 4-door wagon 4-door sedan 4-door hardtop 2-door hardtop
- Layout: FR layout
- Platform: C-body

Powertrain
- Engine: 383 cu in (6.28 L) B 2-bbl V8; 383 cu in (6.28 L) B 4-bbl V8; 440 cu in (7.2 L) RB V8
- Transmission: 3-speed manual 4-speed manual 2-speed automatic 3-speed automatic

Dimensions
- Wheelbase: 122.0 in (3,100 mm)
- Curb weight: 3,885 lb (1,762 kg)

=== 1969 ===
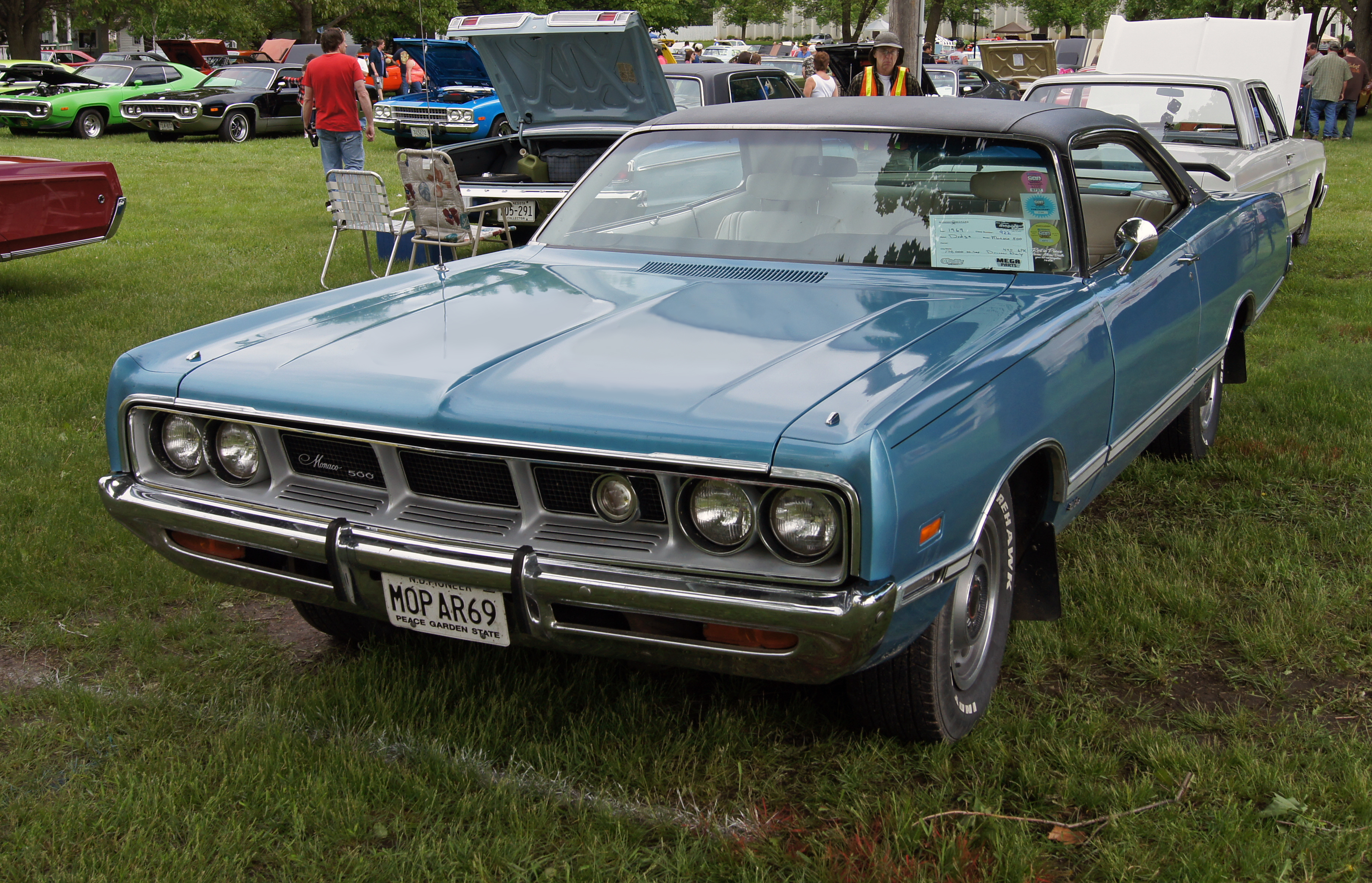
A 1969 Monaco 500 2-door hardtop, equipped with the optional Super-Lite projector road lamp

For the 1969 model year, the wheelbase of the Monaco was increased from 121 inches to 122 inches, and the length was increased to about 220 inches. Returning for 1969 was the "500" option, which in the U.S. market gave the Monaco front bucket seats and a center armrest. In Canada, the Monaco 500 was a separate series that used the side trim of the Polara 500 sold in the U.S. Canadians could also buy a Monaco convertible; U.S. Dodge full-size convertible shoppers had only the lower-end Polara and Polara 500 to choose from.

All full-sized Dodge cars, including the Monaco, adopted Chrysler Corporation's new "fuselage" styling, in which the upper and lower body are melded into a uniformly curved unit. Curved side glass adds to the effect, as does deleting the "shoulder" along the rear. The look starts in the front of the car, with a nearly straight-across bumper—demanded by a Chrysler executive after a Congressional committee attacked him over the seeming inability of car bumpers to protect vehicles from extensive damage in low-speed collisions—and a five-segment egg-crate grille that surrounds the headlamps. When the cars failed to spark buyers' interest, Dodge executives demanded a change. By the summer of 1969, the division released new chrome trim for the front fender caps and leading edge of the hood as an option, which gives the appearance of a then-fashionable loop bumper without the tooling expense. At the rear, Dodge's signature delta-shaped taillamps were presented in a new form that required the top of the bumper to slope downward toward each end.

The standard-equipment engine on the 1969 Monaco is Chrysler's 245-horsepower (183 kW) B-block 383 cu in (6.3 L) V8 engine with a two-barrel 2245 Holley carburetor. Buyers could order the 383 with a four-barrel carburetor that increased power to 330 hp (250 kW), or they could opt for the 375-horsepower (280 kW) 440 cu in (7.2 L) Magnum RB-block engine. Station wagons with the 440 were rated at 350 hp (261 kW; 355 PS).

The 1969 Monaco offered, as a $50 option, the first modern polyellipsoidal (projector) automotive road lamp. Called "Super-Lite" and mounted in the driver's side of the grille, this auxiliary headlamp was produced in a joint venture between Chrysler Corporation and Sylvania. It uses an 85-watt halogen bulb and was intended as a mid-beam, to extend the reach of the low beams during turnpike travel when low beams alone were inadequate, but high beams would produce excessive glare to oncoming drivers.

Available models for 1969 included a two-door hardtop coupe, four-door hardtop sedan, four-door pillared sedan, and four-door station wagons with six- or nine-passenger capacity. A new Brougham option package included a vinyl roof on sedans and hardtops and a split-bench front seat with a reclining mechanism on the passenger side (except on the two-door hardtops). Monaco wagons received wood-grained vinyl trim along their sides and across the dual-action (side- and bottom-hinged) tailgate.

Sales of the Polara and Monaco were down by nearly 20,000 cars compared with 1968, with the Monaco line accounting for 38,566 of the 127,252 full-size cars made by Dodge for the year.

=== 1970 ===
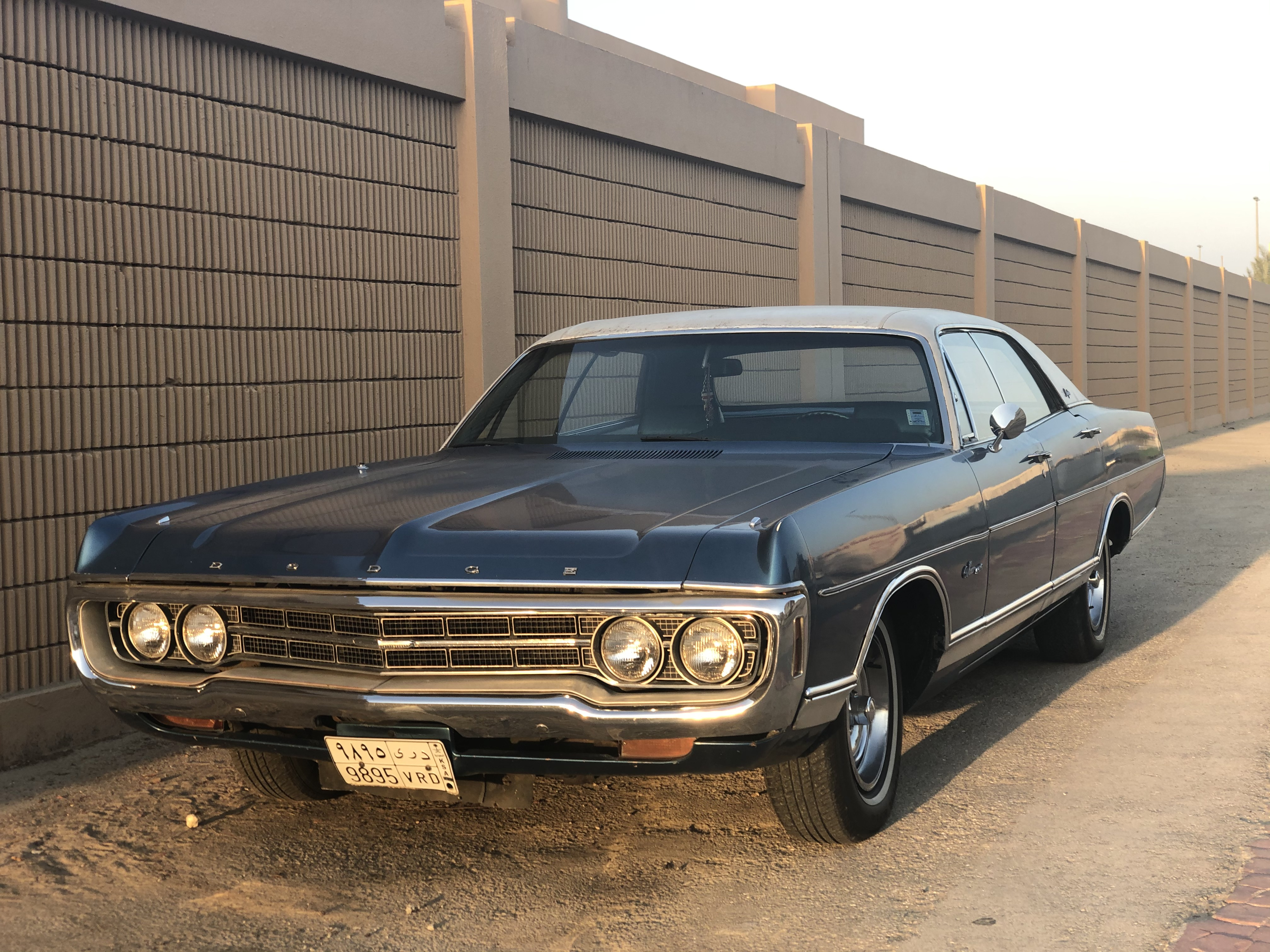
1970 Dodge Monaco 500 4-door

The 1970 models featured new front and rear styling, including complex loop-type bumpers front and rear. In the front, the new bumper enclosed a new diecast grille and the headlamps. At the rear, the double-loop bumper enclosed the taillamps. Reversing lamps were moved up into the endcaps that terminated the quarter panels, in slotted body-color housings. The designers chose to emphasize the length of the hood this year, which meant that the redesigned front end grew by three inches. However, the new rear end was four inches (102 mm) shorter.

Improvements to the suspension were promoted as the new "Torsion-Quiet" system, which used strategically placed rubber isolators to reduce road noise and vibrations. The rear wheel track was broadened by nearly three inches as Dodge installed the rear axle that had been used only on Wagons on all 1970 Monaco models.

The Brougham and 500 option packages continued, as did the availability of the Super-Lite, but the 440 Magnum V8 was dropped. The 350 horsepower (260 kW) version 440, available only in wagons for 1969, became the new top engine for all Monacos. Despite all of the changes, which cost Chrysler a rather large sum of money, Monaco (and Polara) sales declined, with 24,692 Monacos built for the model year.

=== 1971 ===
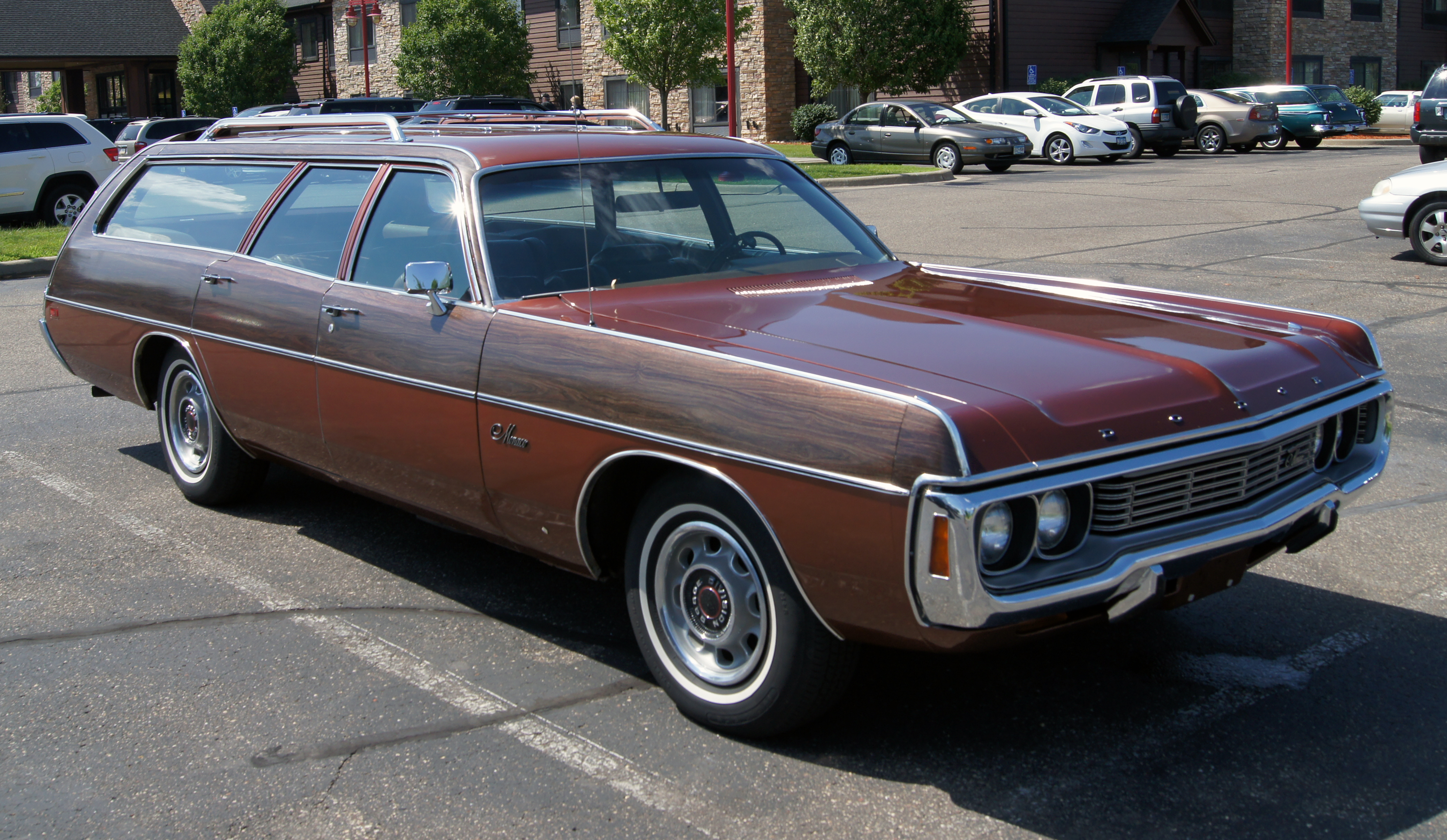
1971 Dodge Monaco Station Wagon

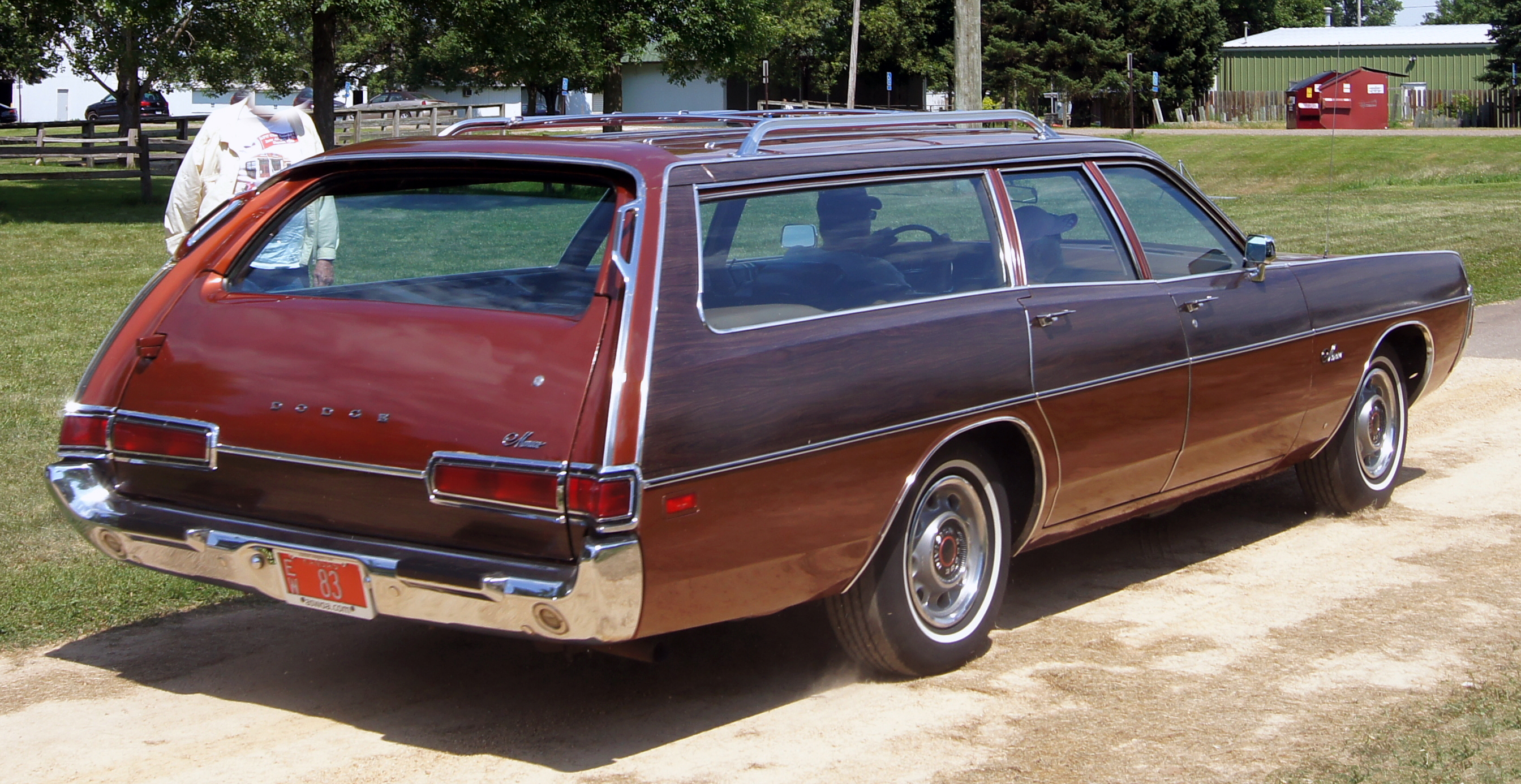
1971 Dodge Monaco Station Wagon, rear view showing the new woodgrain trim application

The 1971 model year Monaco received a facelift featuring a new grille within the bumper that had been used the previous year, and other minor styling changes focused mainly on the rear. The Super-Lite was no longer available because of a lack of consumer interest and challenges to its legality in some states. A new single-loop rear bumper and larger taillamps were installed.

The 500 option package was discontinued. A stereo cassette player-recorder with a microphone was new on the option list. Bucket seats remained available despite the loss of the 500 package, and the Brougham package was also available for $220, despite the addition of a separate Polara Brougham series.

All engines had their compression ratio reduced so they could all run satisfactorily on regular-grade gasoline. The two-barrel 383 versions still has the same power rating 245 hp (183 kW), the four-barrel 383 dropped to 290 hp (220 kW), and the 440 dropped to 320 hp (240 kW).

Monaco station wagons, which in 1969 and 1970 featured woodgrain trim on the lower bodysides, now had woodgrain high on the sides, including around the side windows. The new vinyl decals were translucent, allowing some paint color to shine through.

Despite the power losses and mild styling change, sales slightly rose. About 900 more Monacos were built for 1971 (approximately 25,544 — an exact number is unknown).

=== 1972 ===
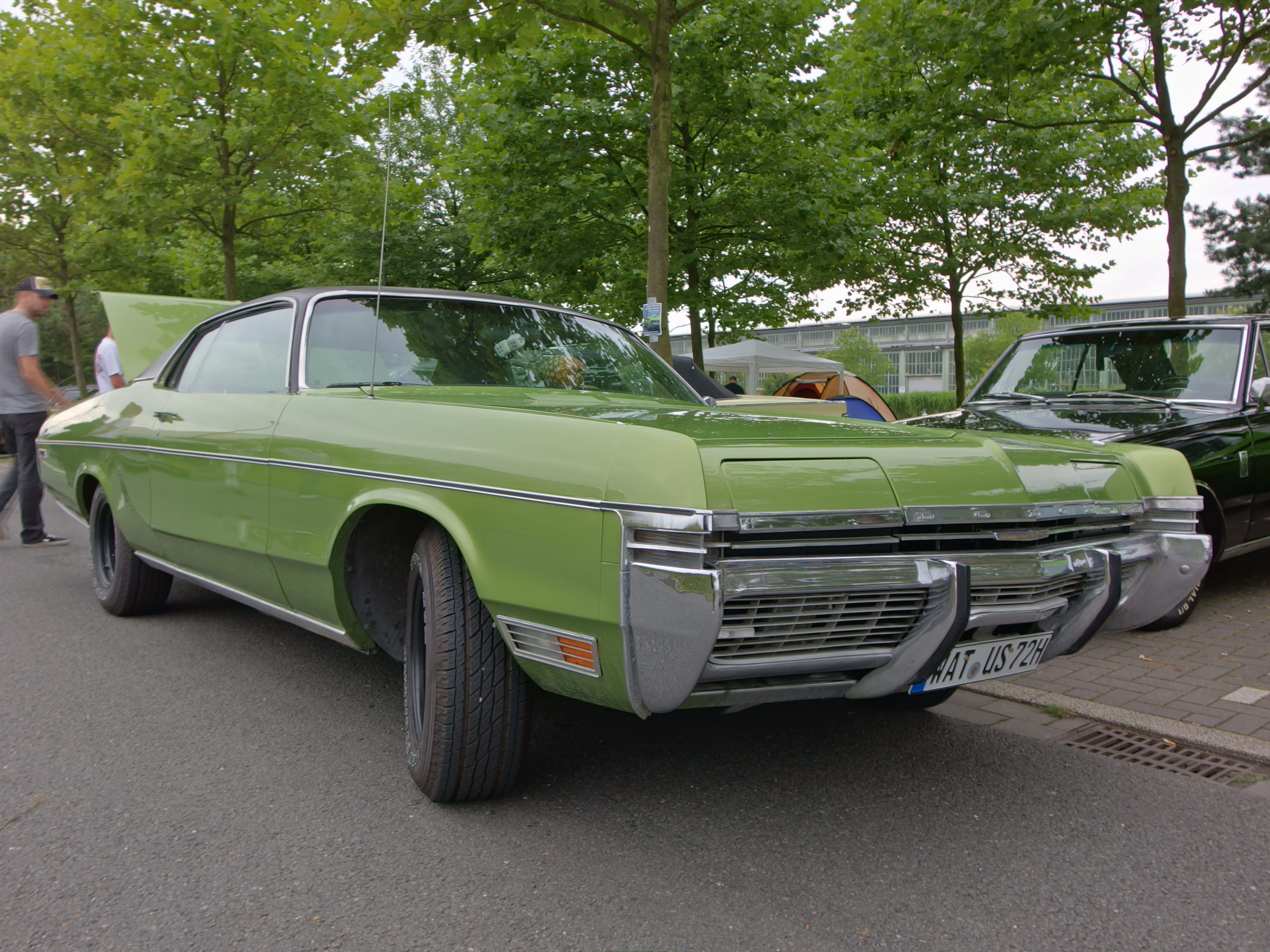
1972 Dodge Monaco 2-door hardtop

For the 1972 model year, the full-sized Dodges featured all-new sheet metal that had been initially planned for 1971.

Setting off the new look for the Monaco was a new front end with hidden headlamps set above a completely new bumper and grille assembly. The car's sides lost their previous plump appearance in favor of a new, lean look with a new feature line that started on the front fenders and ran back through the doors, kicking up ahead of the rear wheels. Sedan and hardtop rooflines were new and more formal-looking. At the rear, there was another new loop bumper and full-width taillamp. Station wagons received a new rear appearance with "stacked" vertical taillamps.

The standard V8 for 1972 Monacos was the 360 cu in (5.9 L) LA-block engine, which had been introduced in 1971 as an option on Polaras. It was rated at 210 hp (157 kW; 213 PS), as measured net instead of gross. A new engine optional, 400 cu in (6.6 L) B-block V8. The 440 remained available, but it now produced 275 hp (205 kW; 279 PS) (net). Sales for 1972 nearly matched 1969 levels, with 37,013 built for the model year.

=== 1973 ===
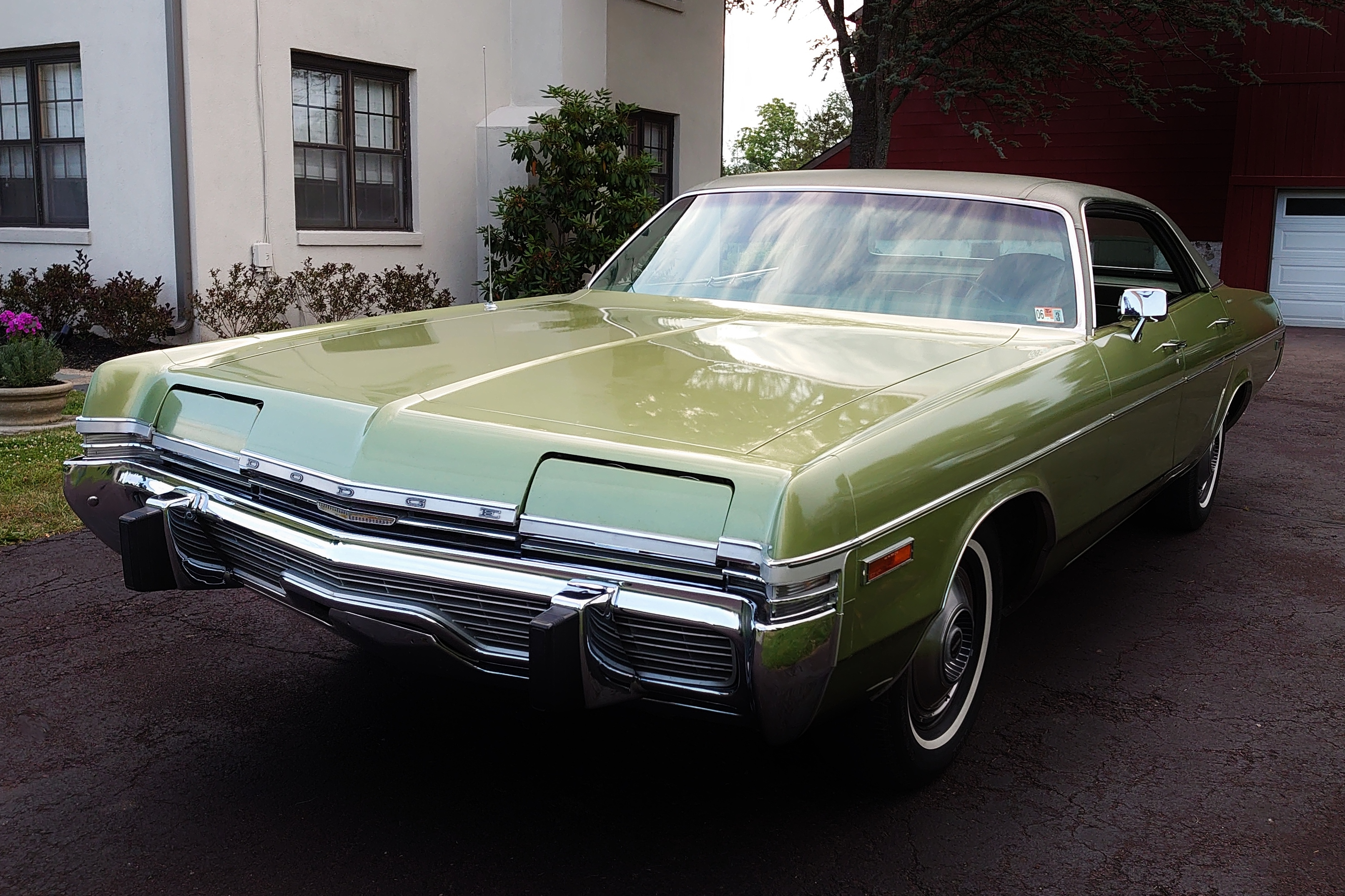
1973 Dodge Monaco 4-Door Hardtop

For its last year in the fuselage body, the Monaco continued with its 1972 styling, except for another new rear bumper with redesigned taillamps, along with a new decklid and rear-quarter endcaps. Large black rubber guards were added to the bumpers to comply with new Federal five-mile-per-hour impact standards. Hardtop and sedan models gained about 6.5 in (16.5 cm) due mostly to the bumper guards.

Inside, new fire-retardant materials in virtually every visible part of the interior meant added safety. Under the hood, all three available engines gained reliability with the addition of Chrysler's new electronic ignition system as standard equipment, which extended spark plug life and virtually eliminated periodic ignition system maintenance.

Despite the improvements, sales dropped again to 29,396.

The 1973 model year was to be the Monaco's final year as Dodge's top-of-the-line full-size car. After 14 years, the Polara name was discontinued, and, in 1974, all big Dodges carried the Monaco name.

=== South Africa ===
In July 1969, Chrysler South Africa introduced a rebadged locally built version of the Dodge Monaco as the Chrysler 383. This badge remained in use for about four years, being dropped in early 1973. This was the first time they had used the "Chrysler" badge on a locally built product in ten years. It was also one of the biggest cars built there, and had the biggest engine as well. The 383 cu in (6.3 L) V8 was rated at 290 hp (216 kW), and the fully equipped car featured power windows and a standard vinyl roof.

== Third generation (1974–1977) ==
Third generation
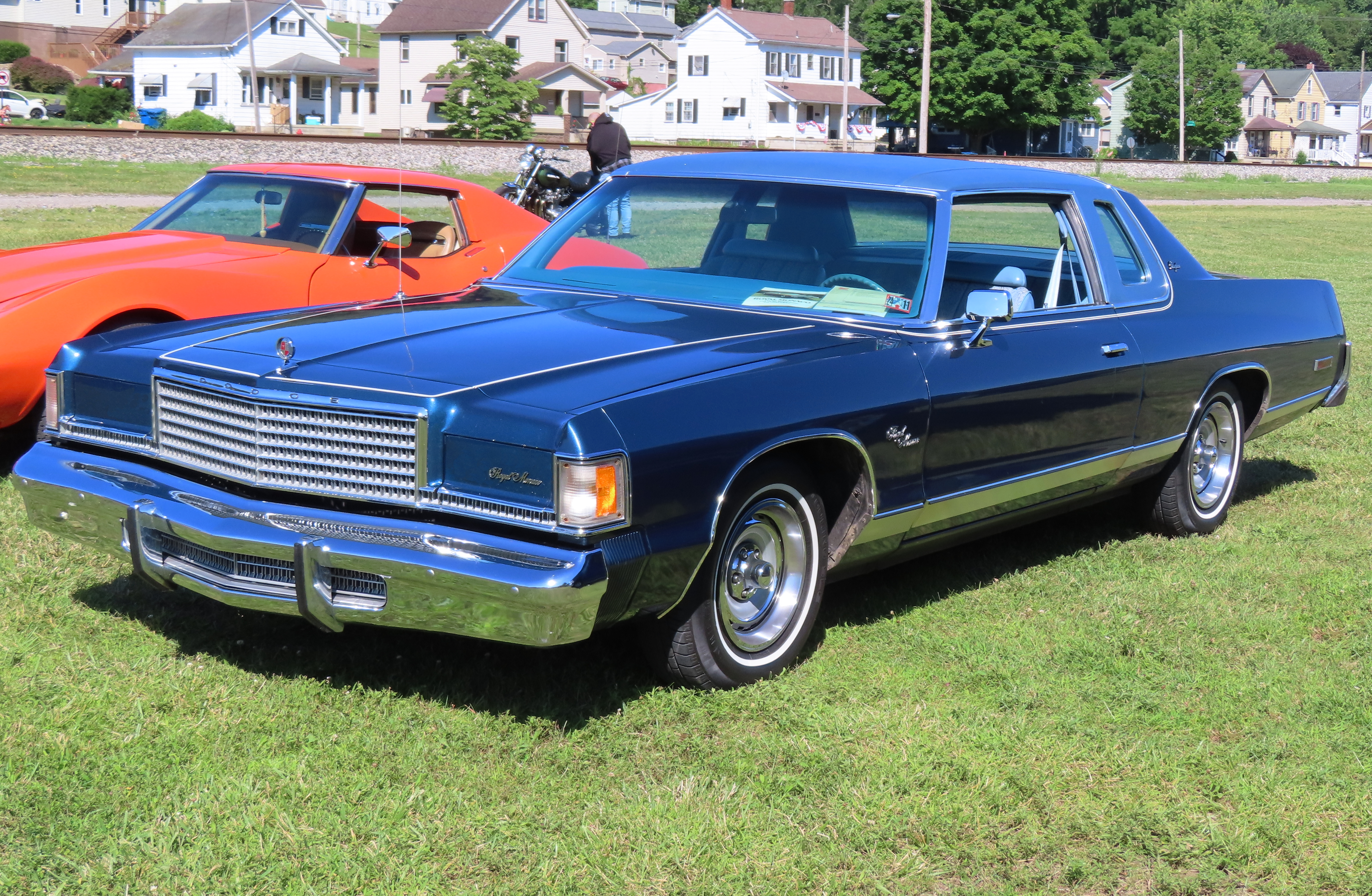
- 1977 Dodge Royal Monaco Brougham 2-door hardtop

Overview
- Production: 1973–1977
- Model years: 1974–1976; 1977 (as Royal Monaco)
- Assembly: United States: Hamtramck, Michigan (Dodge Main Factory)
- Designer: Steven N Bollinger (1974–1975)

Body and chassis
- Class: Full-size
- Body style: 4-door wagon (1974–1977); 4-door sedan (1974–1977); 4-door hardtop (1974–1975); 2-door hardtop (1974–1977); 2-door coupe (1975–1976)
- Layout: FR layout
- Platform: C-body

Powertrain
- Engine: 318 cu in (5.2 L) V8; 360 cu in (5.9 L) V8; 400 cu in (6.6 L) V8; 440 cu in (7.2 L) V8
- Transmission: 3-speed manual 4-speed manual 3-speed automatic

=== 1974 ===
The full-size C-body 1974 Dodge Monaco was completely redesigned for the 1974 model year with an all-new unibody platform and sheet metal. However, the 1973 oil crisis began within days of their introduction. Chrysler was excoriated in the media for bringing out huge new cars, and sales suffered accordingly. Many in the automotive press also criticized the car's new design as being too derivative of what they thought resembled a 3-year-old Buick or Oldsmobile full-size car. The Dodge Polara and Polara Custom models were discontinued after the 1973 model year. The Monaco and Monaco Custom replaced them respectively. The previous Monaco was renamed Monaco Brougham. The Brougham name was used on a luxury option package from 1969 to 1973. Fixed headlamps on all Monacos replaced the hidden headlamps of the previous models. The standard engine on all Monacos was a 360 cu in (5.9 L) with a 2-barrel carburetor—engine options included a 360 cu in (5.9 L) with a 4-barrel carburetor, a 400 cu in (6.6 L) with a 2- or 4-barrel carburetor, and a 440 cu in (7.2 L) with a 4-barrel carburetor.

=== 1975 ===
For the 1975 model year, changes to the base Monaco were minimal. However, the Monaco Custom was renamed the Royal Monaco, and the Monaco Brougham became the Royal Monaco Brougham. These newly named models featured hidden headlamps. 1975 was the last model year in which the four-door hardtop was available. Some models, depending on equipment and the state they were sold in, received catalytic converters to comply with increasingly strict vehicle emissions control regulations. After the start of the 1975 model year, a limited-production option for Royal Monaco Brougham coupes was introduced: the Diplomat package featured a landau vinyl roof with opera windows and a wide steel roof band. It was available in only three colors—Cold Metallic, Silver Cloud Metallic, and Maroon Metallic. The standard Monaco and Royal Monaco engine was a 360 cu in (5.9 L) with a 2-barrel carburetor. At the same time, Royal Monaco Broughams and wagons received a 400 cu in (6.6 L) with a 4-barrel carburetor. Engine options for the Monaco and the Royal Monaco were a 400 cu in (6.6 L) with a 2- or 4-barrel carburetor, and all Monacos could be upgraded to a 440 cu in (7.2 L) with a 4-barrel carburetor. The car weighed over two tons with a top speed of 127 mph.

=== 1976 ===
At the start of the 1976 model year, exterior changes on the full-size C-body 1976 Dodge Monaco were minimal. However, all models (including police packages) now had the former high-series front panel with hidden headlights. Chrysler's new Lean Burn system was introduced to reduce exhaust emissions (only on the 400 cubic inch engine). The four-door hardtop, which had been part of the Dodge Monaco lineup during the previous ten model years (from 1966 to 1968, from 1969 to 1973 and from 1974 to 1975) ever since the Dodge Monaco made its debut from eleven model years earlier (1965), had been discontinued during the end of the previous model year (1975), which reduced the choice of body styles to just three offerings, the four-door wagon, four-door sedan, and two-door hardtop for the 1976 model year. A 318 cu in (5.2 L) with a two-barrel carburetor and 150 bhp became standard on the base Monaco. At the same time, the Royal Monaco Broughams and wagons were downgraded to 400 cu in (6.6 L) with 2-barrel carburetors, but the Royal Monaco continued with 1975's 360 cu in (5.9 L) with a two-barrel carburetor. The 440 cu in (7.2 L) with a four-barrel carburetor could still be ordered.

=== 1977 (Royal Monaco) ===
For the 1977 model year, the Monaco was effectively split into two model lines, with the Royal Monaco retaining the full-size C-platform alongside the Chrysler New Yorker, with the standard Monaco replacing the Coronet B-platform intermediate. Offered in standard and Brougham trims, the Royal Monaco was produced as a two-door hardtop sedan, four-door sedan, and five-door station wagon.

The 318 cubic-inch V8 became the standard engine for the first time. Outside of California, the 360 V8 (with a two-barrel carburetor) and the 400 V8 remained available; the 440 V8 was offered as an option. A 3-speed automatic was the only transmission available.

The Royal Monaco was discontinued for the 1978 model year, as Chrysler offered the C-platform only through its namesake division.

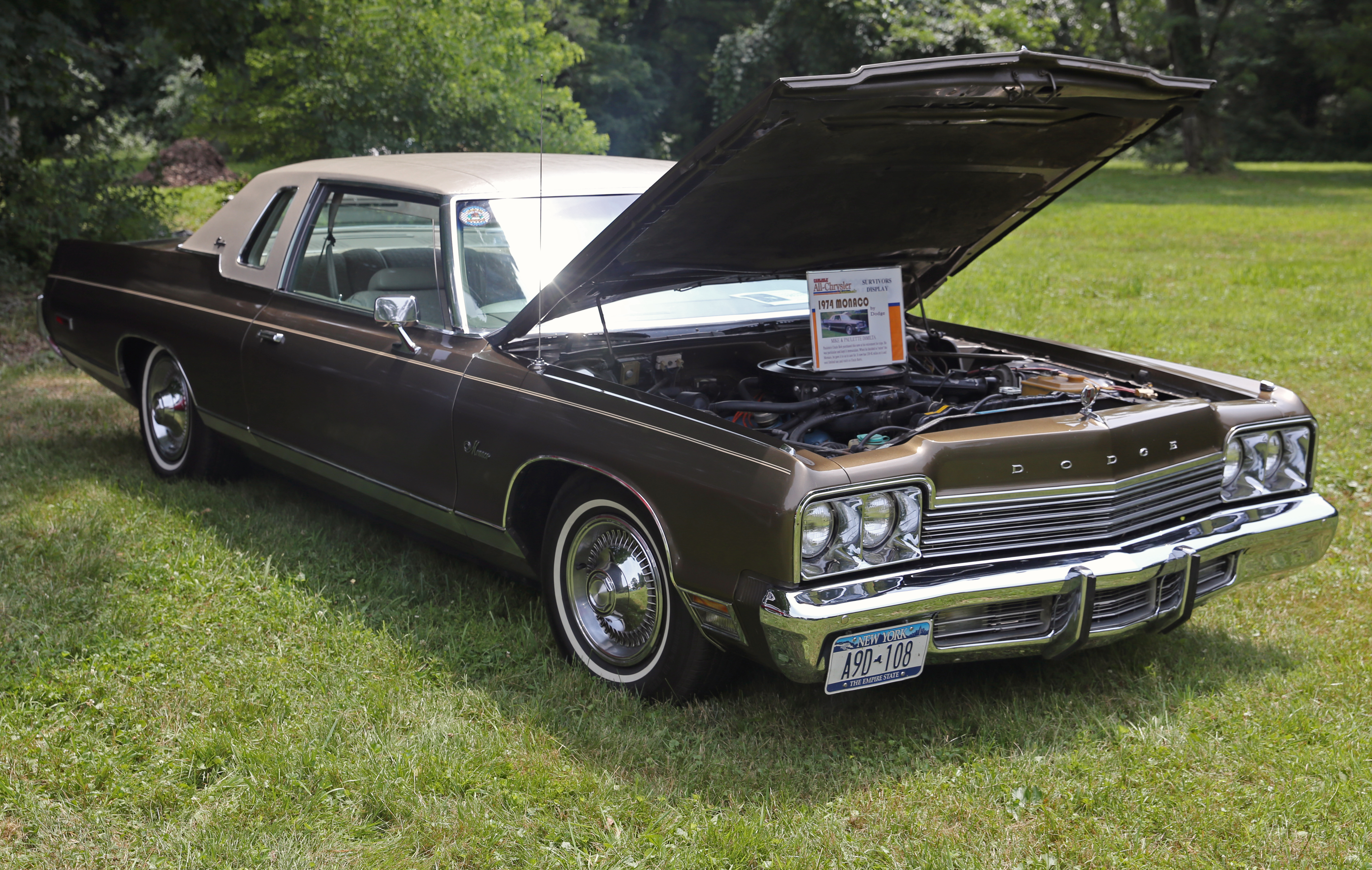
1974 Dodge Monaco Brougham 2-door hardtop

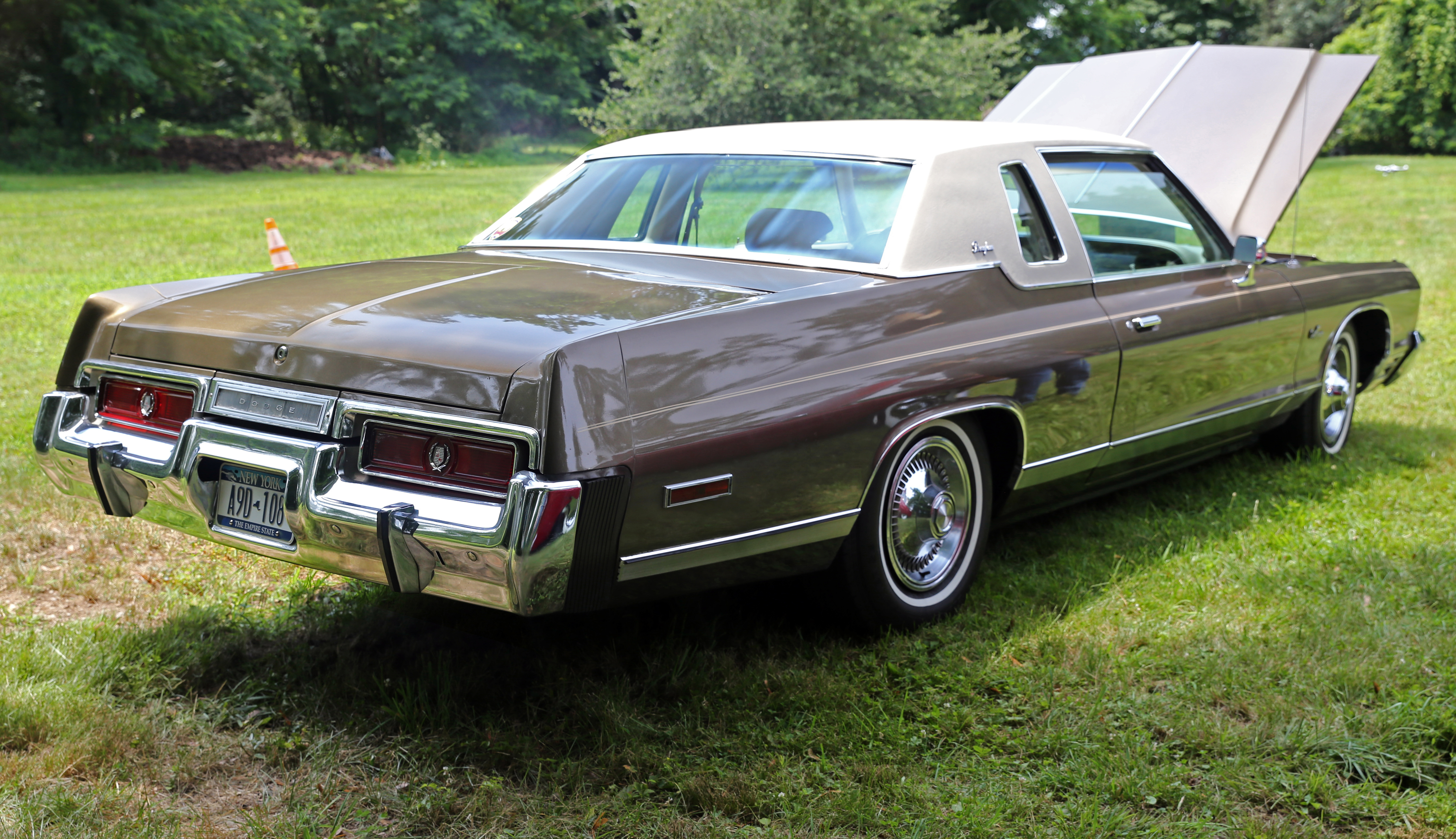
1974 Dodge Monaco Brougham 2-door hardtop

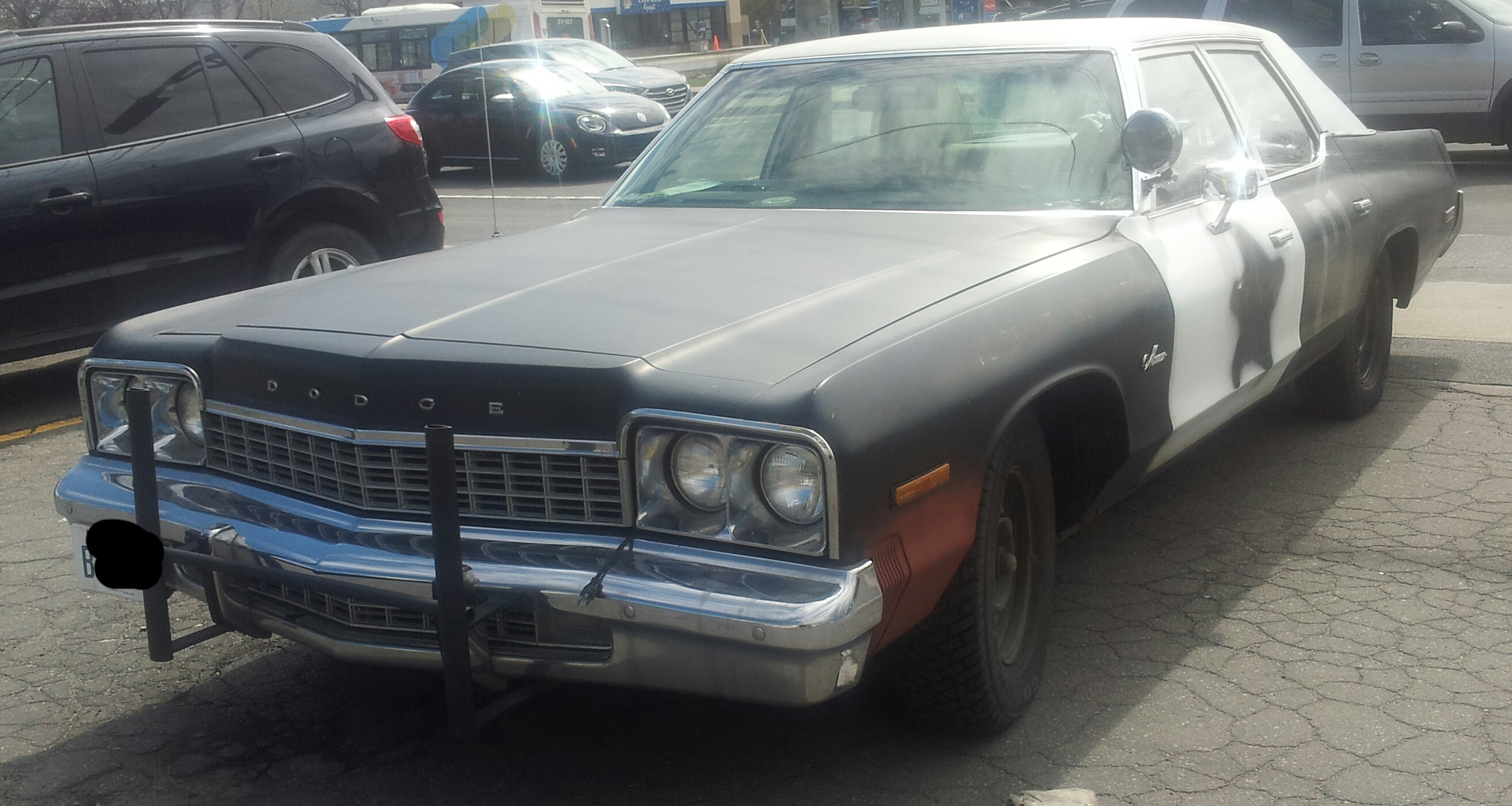
1975 Dodge Monaco 4-door sedan

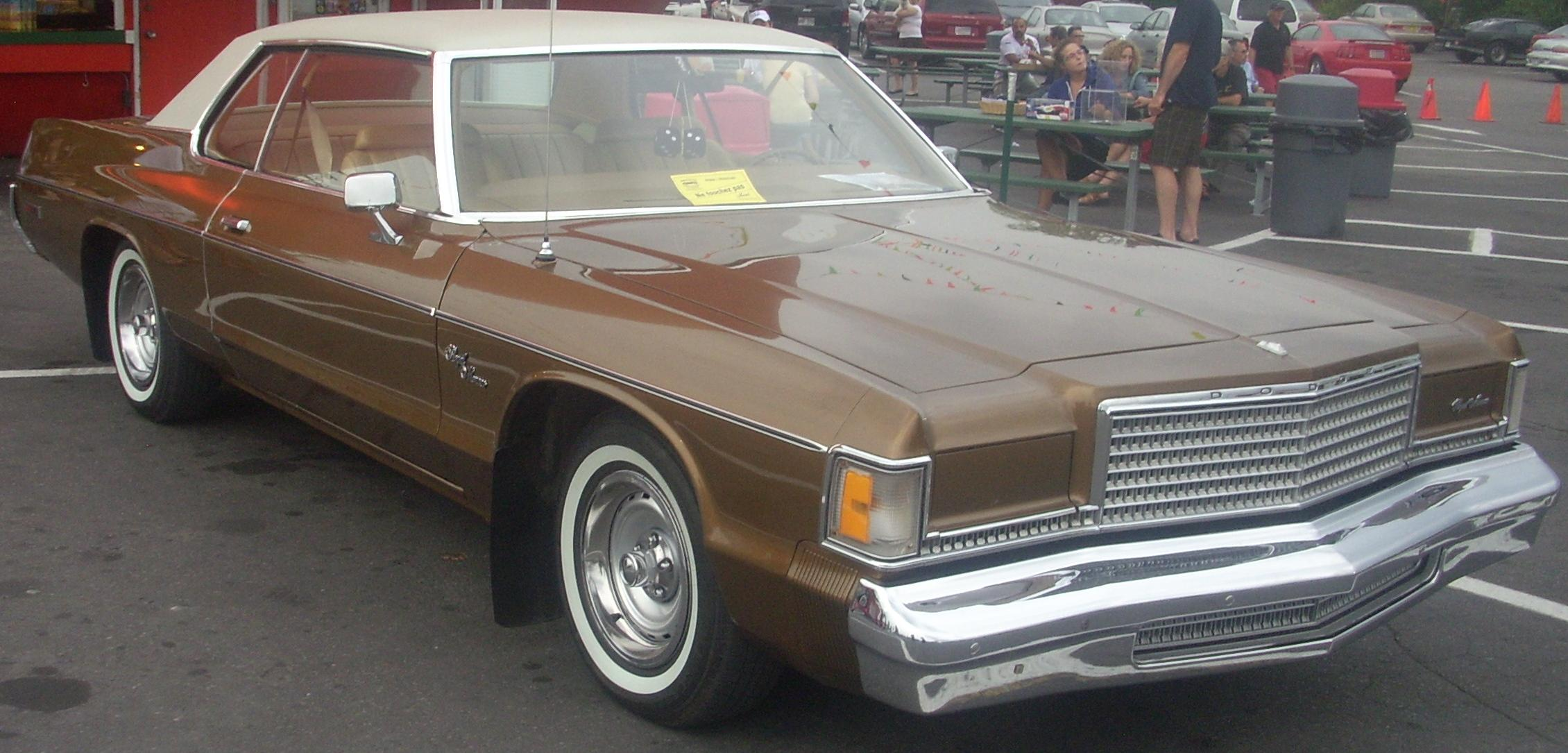
1976 Dodge Royal Monaco 2-door hardtop

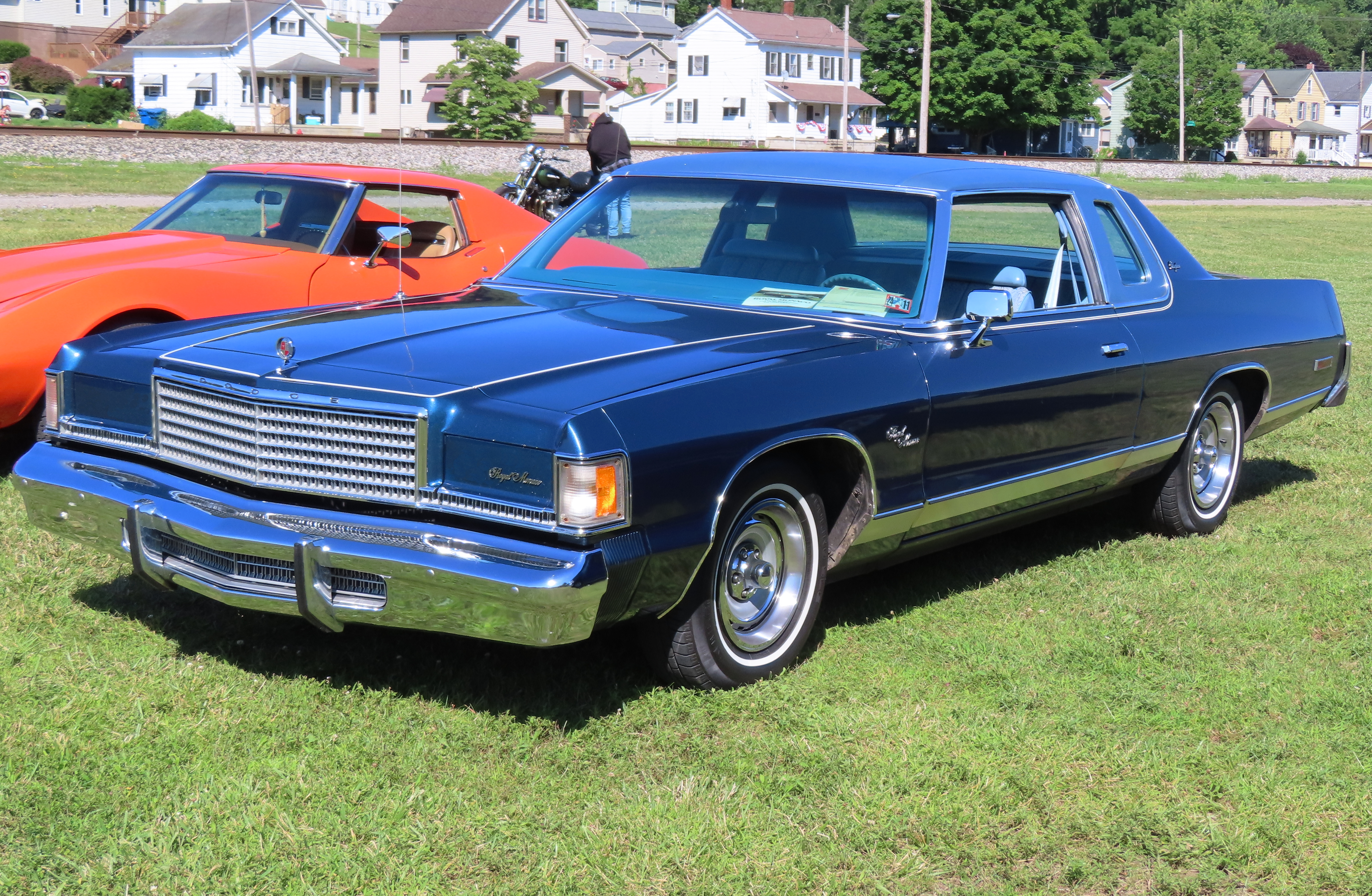
1977 Dodge Royal Monaco Brougham 2-door hardtop (with non-standard wheels)

== Fourth generation (1977–1978) ==
Fourth generation
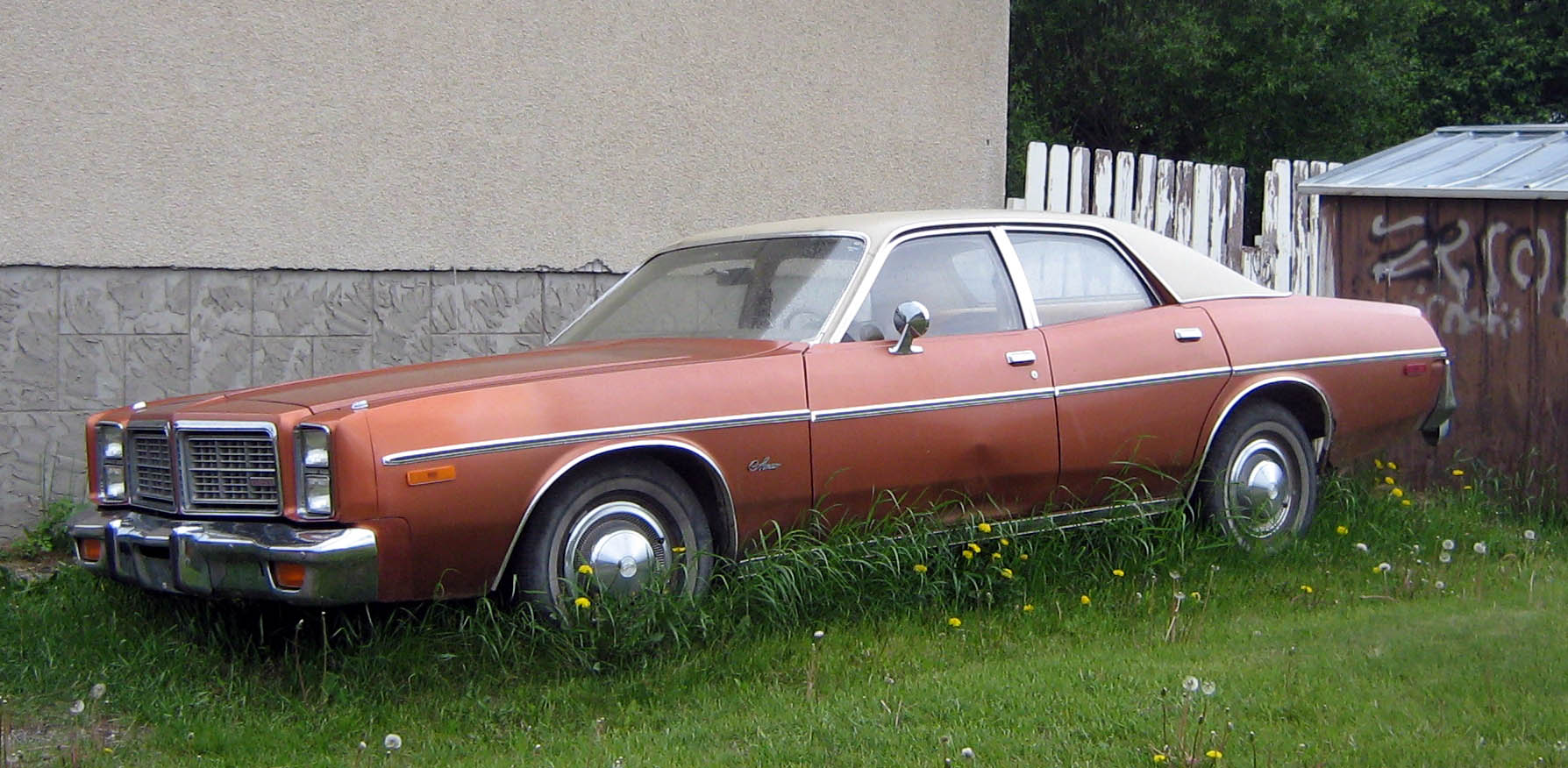
- 1977 Dodge Monaco 4-door sedan

Overview
- Production: 1976–1978
- Model years: 1977–1978
- Assembly: United States: Hamtramck, Michigan (Dodge Main Factory)

Body and chassis
- Class: Mid-size car
- Body style: 4-door wagon 4-door sedan 2-door hardtop
- Layout: FR layout
- Platform: B-body

Powertrain
- Engine: 225 cu in (3.7 L) Slant-Six RG I6; 318 cu in (5.2 L) LA V8; 360 cu in (5.9 L) LA V8; 400 cu in (6.6 L) B V8; 440 cu in (7.2 L) RB V8 (police)
- Transmission: 3-speed manual 4-speed manual 3-speed automatic

Chronology
- Predecessor: Dodge Coronet
- Successor: Dodge St. Regis

=== 1977 ===
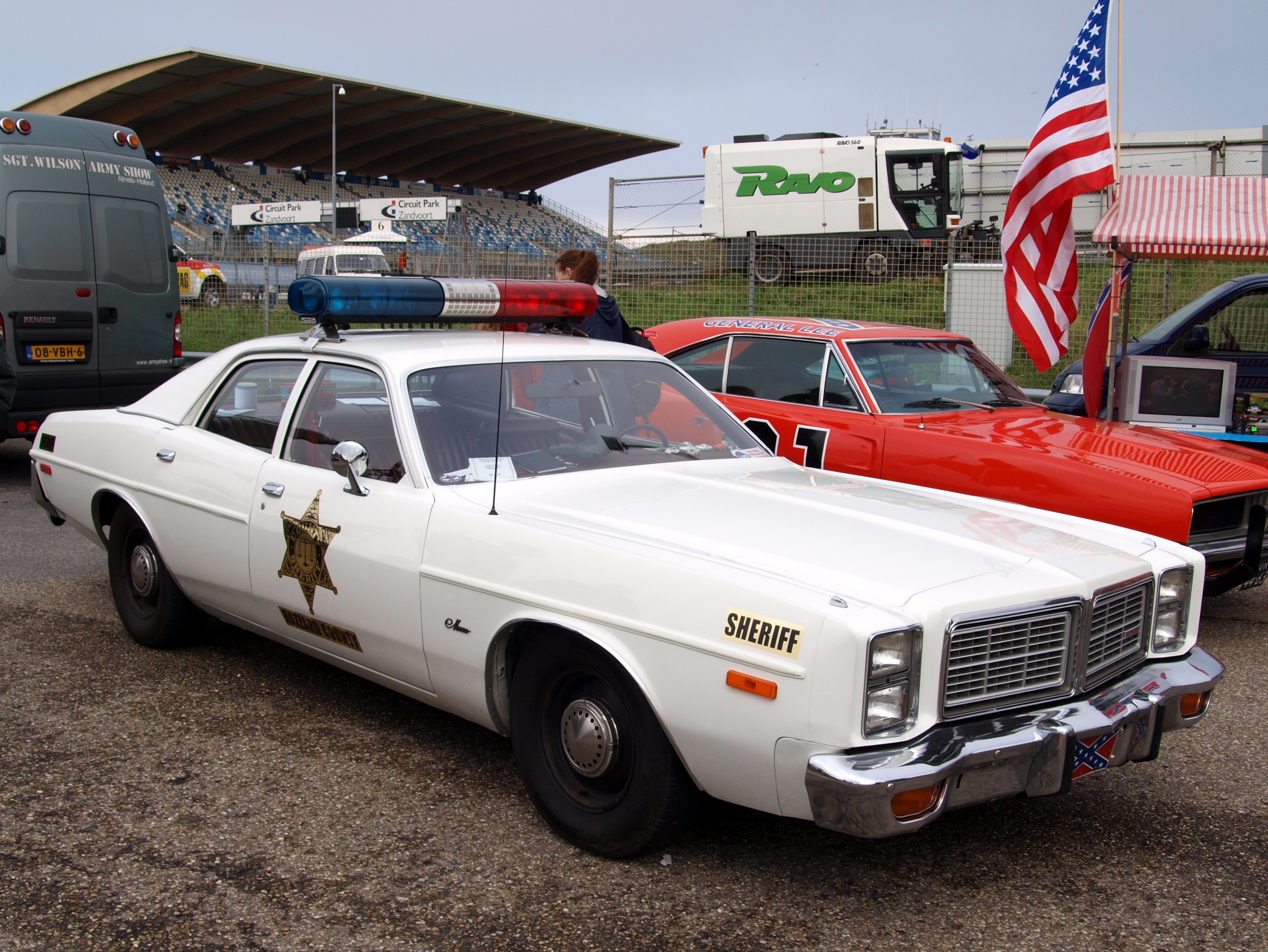
A 1977 Dodge Monaco police car replica from The Dukes of Hazzard television series

The 1977 model year brought changes to the Dodge Monaco lineup as a lingering result of the 1973–1974 energy crisis, especially as Chrysler decided to move the Dodge Monaco, in name form only, from the full-size C platform-body to the mid-size B platform-body line up for the 1977 model year. The entire 1977 Dodge Monaco lineup received a make-over. The previous model year's full-size C-body Dodge Monaco (from 1976) became, just for one year only, the full-size C-body 1977 Dodge Royal Monaco until its discontinuation from all production at the end of the 1977 model year. The mid-size B-body 1977 Dodge Monaco two-door coupe, four-door wagon, and four-door sedan replaced the previous model year's Coronet hardtop coupe, four-door wagon, and four-door sedan. These cars were "corporate twins" to the new-for-1975 "downsized" Plymouth Fury#Seventh_Generation. The 1977 Dodge Monaco Brougham four-door sedan replaced the previous year's Coronet Brougham four-door sedan. The 1977 Dodge Monaco Crestwood four-door wagon replaced the last year's Coronet Crestwood four-door wagon. Aside from the name change, the 1977 Dodge Monacos differed only slightly from the 1976 Coronet equivalents, receiving a revised front-end design with stacked rectangular headlamps.

=== 1978 ===
The 1978 mid-size, B-body Dodge Monaco was unchanged from the previous model year. It became Dodge's largest car during the 1978 model year. The Dodge Monaco was discontinued at the end of the 1978 model year. The B-body cars continued in the form of the Dodge Magnum until 1979.

=== Replacement ===
The Dodge Monaco was replaced by the Dodge St. Regis for the 1979 model year, using the Chrysler R platform (a smaller revision of the B platform). Struggling to compete against the all-new designs of General Motors and Ford, sales of the St. Regis were heavily supported by fleets, primarily as law enforcement vehicles. After 1981, the St. Regis was discontinued (in favor of the Diplomat), becoming the longest-wheelbase sedan Chrysler had produced up to that point.

Production figures:

Dodge Monaco production figures
	Coupe	Sedan	Wagon	Yearly total
1977	21,773	30,341	11,570	63,684
1978	12,236	23,270	6,465	41,971
Total	34,009	53,611	18,035	105,655

== Fifth generation (1990–1992) ==
Fifth generation
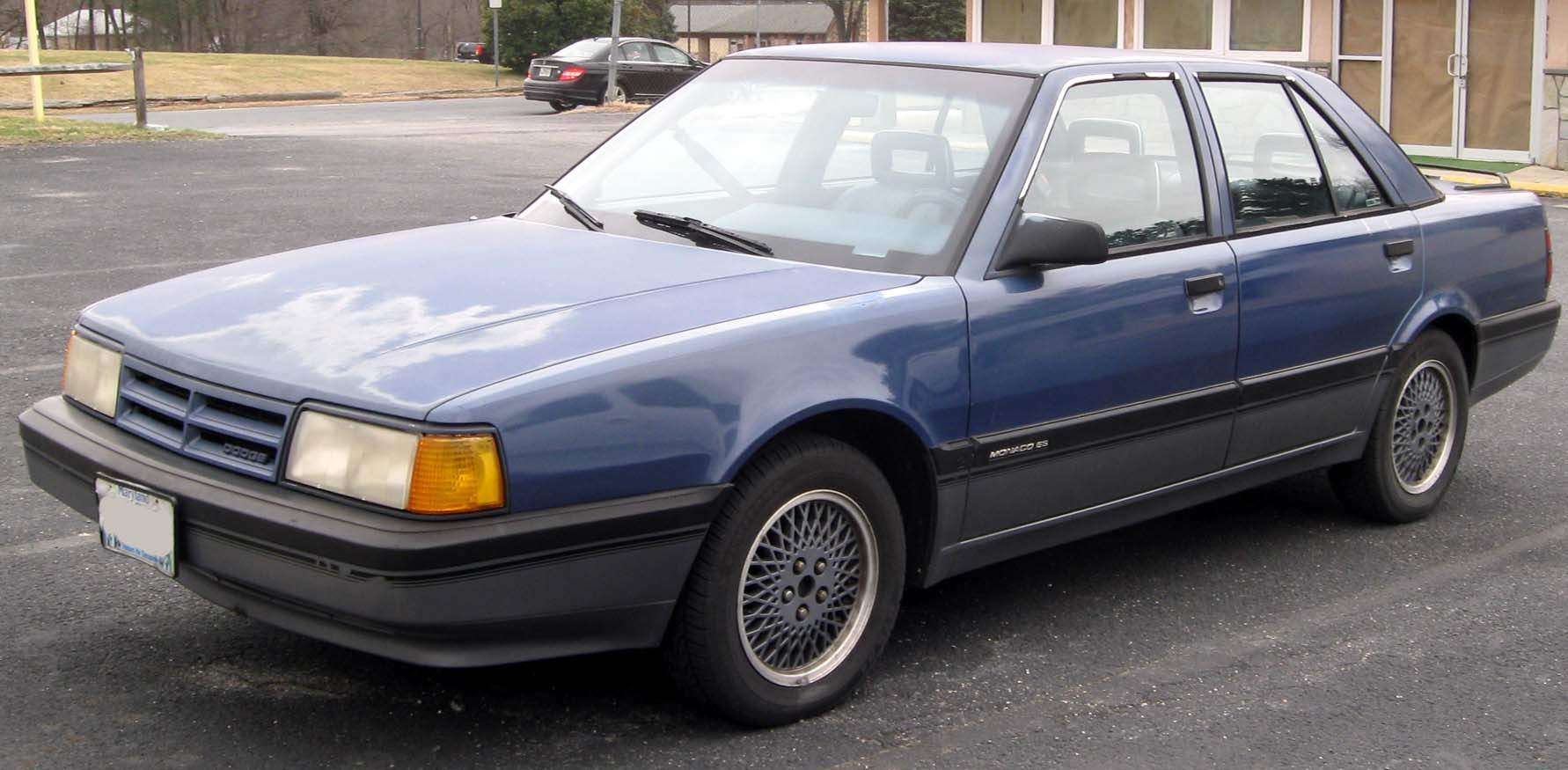
- 1990–1992 Dodge Monaco ES

Overview
- Production: 1989–1992
- Model years: 1990–1992
- Assembly: Canada: Brampton, Ontario (Brampton Assembly)

Body and chassis
- Class: Full-size
- Body style: 4-door sedan
- Layout: Longitudinal front-engine, front-wheel drive
- Platform: B-body
- Related: Eagle Premier/Renault Premier; Eagle Medallion/Renault Medallion; Renault 21; Renault 25

Powertrain
- Engine: 3.0 L (180 cu in) PRV V6
- Transmission: 4-speed ZF 4HP automatic

Dimensions
- Wheelbase: 106.0 in (2,690 mm)
- Length: 192.8 in (4,900 mm)
- Width: 70.0 in (1,780 mm)
- Height: 54.7 in (1,390 mm)

Chronology
- Predecessor: Dodge Diplomat
- Successor: Dodge Intrepid

For the 1990 model year, Dodge revived the Monaco nameplate after a 12-year hiatus. Replacing the long-running Diplomat sedan, the model line was the first full-size Dodge sedan since the 1981 Dodge St. Regis. Slotted above the slightly smaller Dodge Dynasty in size, the fifth-generation Monaco was the Dodge counterpart of the Eagle Premier, available in standard LE and deluxe ES trims.

The Dodge Monaco and Eagle Premier were assembled by the Bramalea Assembly in Brampton, Ontario (opened by AMC in 1986). Although produced in Canada, Chrysler Canada did not sell the model line; following the discontinuation of the Diplomat, the largest Dodge sedan sold in Canada was the mid-size Spirit (the Dynasty was badged as a Chrysler).

For the 1993 model year, Dodge consolidated its two large sedan lines, as the Dodge Intrepid replaced both the Monaco and the Dynasty; the Eagle Vision replaced the Premier.

=== Background and development ===
In August 1987, Chrysler completed its acquisition of American Motors Corporation (AMC). Along with its ownership of the Jeep model line, the AMC Eagle sedan/station wagons, and the Renault lineup of the Alliance and Encore (and the newly introduced Medallion), AMC was sought after for ability to develop and engineer cars quicker (and at lower cost) than other American auto manufacturers. Beginning in 1985, AMC had begun to build the Dodge Omni/Plymouth Horizon and the Dodge Diplomat/Plymouth Gran Fury/Chrysler Fifth Avenue for Chrysler under contract.

At the time of the sale, AMC was nearing the release of the Premier, a collaboration between AMC and Renault to develop a full-size car for the North American market. The largest AMC-branded vehicle since the 1978 Matador, the Premier was to become a full model line, including a four-door sedan, station wagon, and two-door coupe (named the Allure). Derived from the chassis of the Renault 25 (the flagship Renault model line in Europe), the Premier adopted the suspension of the Renault (later Eagle) Medallion (a Renault 21 developed for North America, replacing the Renault 18i and AMC Concord). To further distinguish the AMC Premier from the Renault 25, the model line received an exterior update by Giorgetto Giugiaro; the interior was restyled by AMC designer Dick Teague (one of his final designs). The standard engine was an AMC-sourced 2.5 L inline-4 (shared with Jeep) and an optional 3.0 L PRV V6.

The Premier began production in September 1987 for the 1988 model year. While prototypes wore Renault badging, all production vehicles wore the badging of the newly created Eagle brand (though designated with AMC VINs). The flagship of the Eagle brand, the Premier, was slotted above the Medallion (a nearly direct rebrand of the Renault 21) and the Eagle Wagon (the former AMC Eagle, ending production in December 1987).

Along with its purchase of AMC, Chrysler contractually agreed to use 260,000 PRV V6 engines. For 1988 and 1989, Eagle sold fewer than 90,000 Premiers, forcing Chrysler to shutter the Bramalea plant on several occasions. To expand production of the facility and also to fulfill its obligation to Renault sooner, Chrysler opted to offer a Dodge-branded version of the model line alongside the Premier for the 1990 model year.

=== Model overview ===
==== Chassis ====
The Dodge Monaco and Eagle Premier use the front-wheel drive Chrysler B platform. Developed in collaboration with AMC and Renault, the architecture was the final AMC vehicle platform and the automaker's only front-wheel drive chassis. Originally codenamed X-58, the chassis was renamed following its acquisition by Chrysler. Sharing only its letter designation with the 1962-1979 Chrysler intermediate architecture, the 1988-1992 B platform is derived from the Renault 25, sharing the rear torsion-bar suspension design of the Renault 21.

The Dodge Monaco was fitted with four-wheel disc brakes (introduced to the Premier for 1990), with anti-lock brakes (ABS) becoming added in 1991. The first-generation Dodge Viper shares its rear disc brakes with the Dodge Monaco/Eagle Premier (without ABS).

Engineered by former Renault product engineer François Castaing, the B platform adopted a longitudinal engine configuration, allowing for better engine access and more stable handling. To increase compatibility with other Chrysler vehicles (and to increase reliability), the B platform shifted from Renault to Chrysler electrical components for the 1990 model year.

===== Powertrain =====
The Dodge Monaco was powered by the Renault-produced 3.0 L "Douvrin" PRV V6, paired with a ZF-produced 4-speed automatic transmission

==== Body ====
For 1990, the Eagle Premier underwent a minor revision (leading to the deletion of the Design Giugiaro badges). The Dodge Monaco shared its entire body with the Premier, differing in turn signal lenses (amber instead of clear), trunk lid design (gray trim between the taillamps), and the adoption of the Dodge "crosshair" grille.

In contrast to the Dodge Dynasty (six-passenger with a 50/50 split front bench seat and column-mount shifter), the Monaco was a five-passenger vehicle with front bucket seats and a console-mounted shifter.

For 1991, the Monaco replaced chrome trim on all models with black or body-color trim. To streamline production, air conditioning, and automatic climate control became standard.

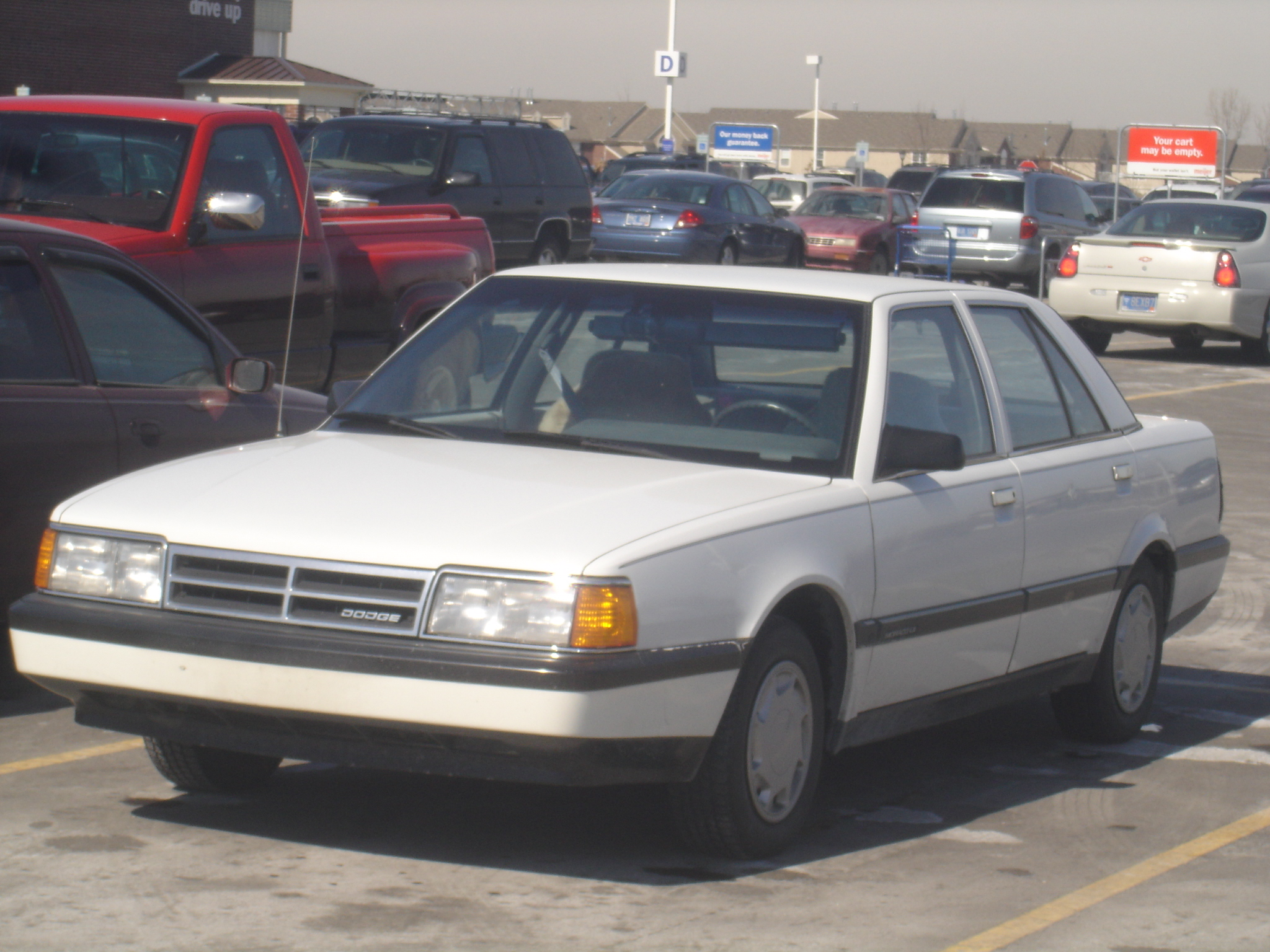
1990 Dodge Monaco LE

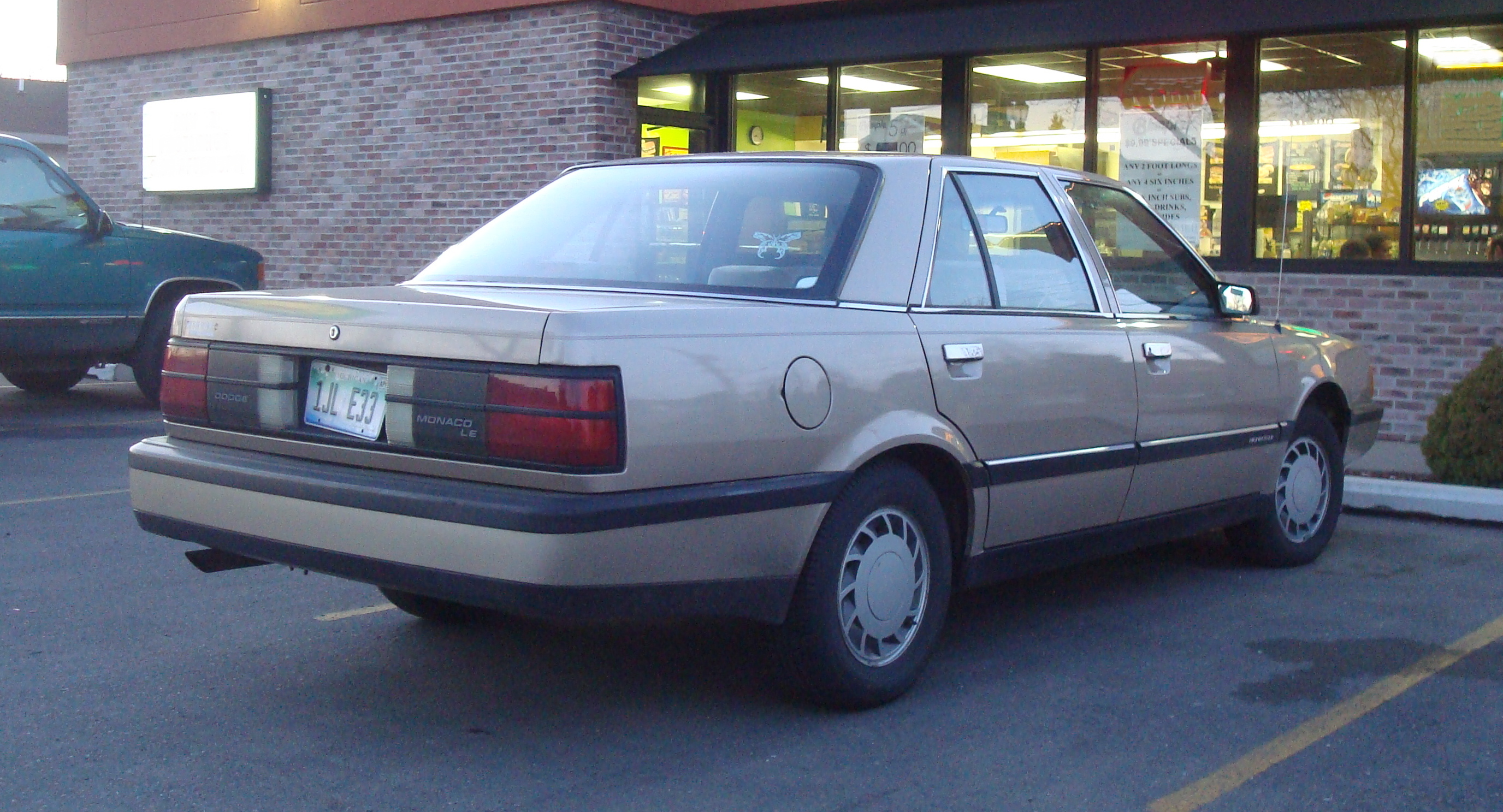
Dodge Monaco LE, rear

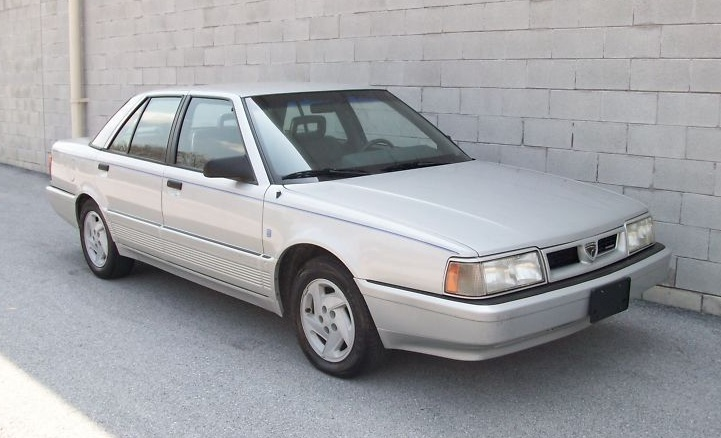
Eagle Premier ES (1992)

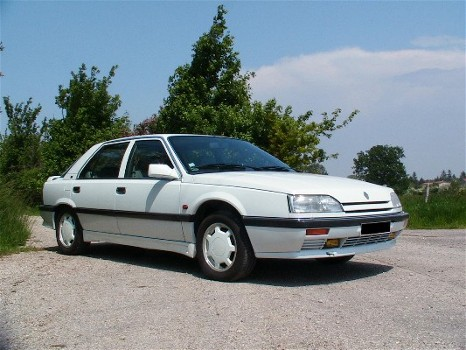
Renault 25

=== Production ===
1988-1992 Chrysler B platform production
Model year	Dodge Monaco	Eagle Premier
1988		45,546
1989		41,349
1990	7,153	14,243
1991	12,436	11,634
1992	1,960	4,730

== See also ==
- Bluesmobile, a fictional car used in the 1980 film The Blues Brothers, based on a 1974 Dodge Monaco.

== Bibliography ==
- Burness, Tad, American Car Spotter's Guide (Osceola, WI: Motorbooks International, 1978 & 1981)
