= Dodge D series =

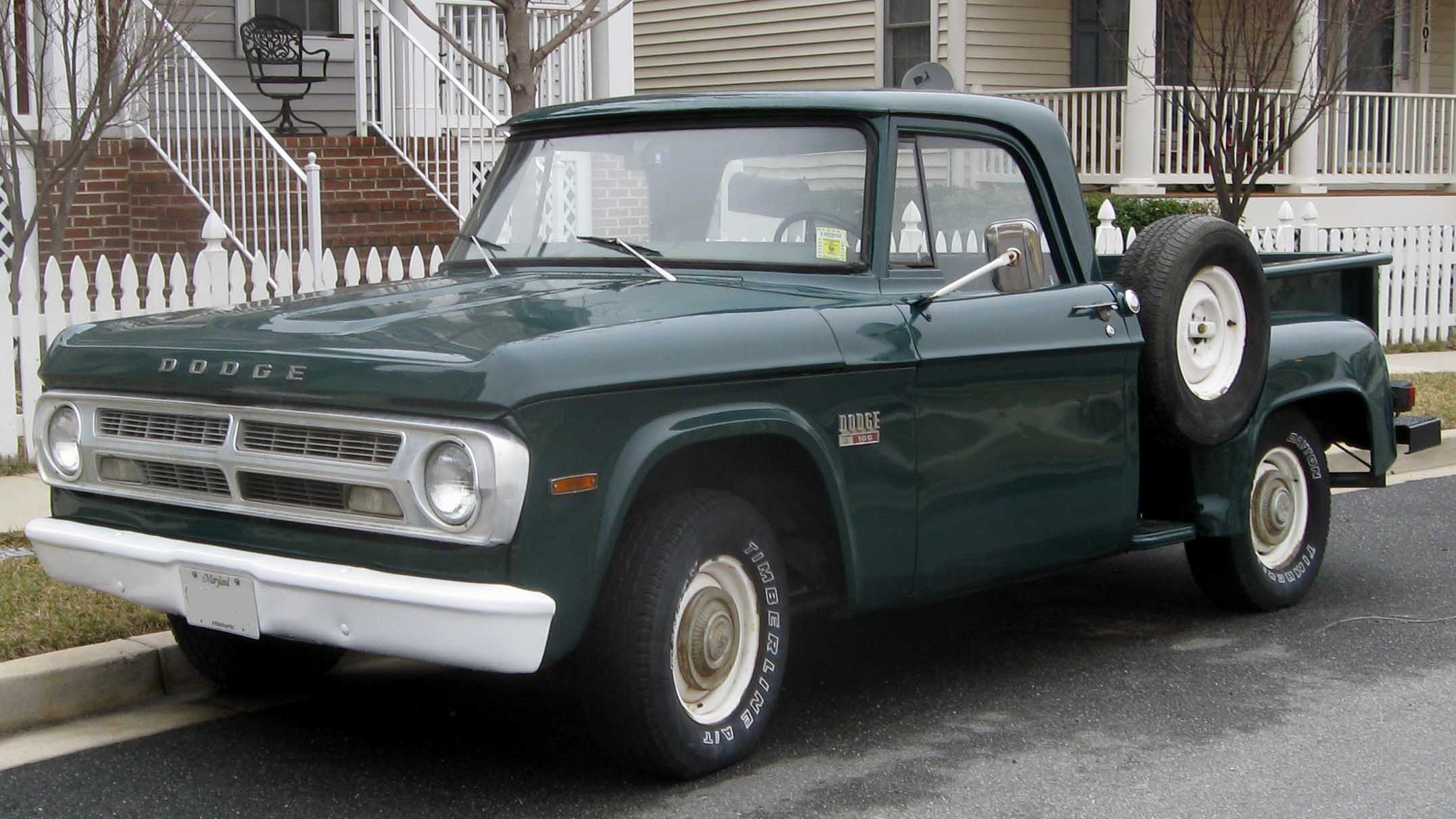

Overview
- Manufacturer: Dodge (Chrysler)
- Also called: Fargo 100 (Canada); Dodge Ram (1980–1993); Dodge W series (4×4 models); Dodge Power Ram (4×4 models from 1980–1993)
- Production: October 1960 – September 1993
- Model years: 1961–1993
- Assembly: United States: Warren, Michigan (Warren Truck Assembly); Argentina: San Justo (1961–1979); Brazil: Santo André (1968–1984); Canada: Windsor, Ontario (Windsor Assembly); Colombia: Bogotá (1969–1976)

Body and chassis
- Class: Full-size pickup truck
- Body style: 2-door truck 4-door truck
- Layout: Front engine, rear-wheel drive Front engine, four-wheel drive
- Platform: Chrysler AD platform

Chronology
- Predecessor: Dodge C series
- Successor: Dodge Ram (newer platforms have "D" prefixed in their identity)

The Dodge D series (also called D/W series) is a line of pickup trucks that was sold by Dodge from October 1960 to September 30, 1993. The same basic design was retained until the October 1993 introduction of a completely redesigned Ram. The D/W series shared its AD platform with the Dodge Ramcharger/Plymouth Trail Duster twins. Two-wheel-drive (4×2) models were designated D, while four-wheel-drive (4×4) models were designated W.

== First generation (1961–1965) ==
First generation
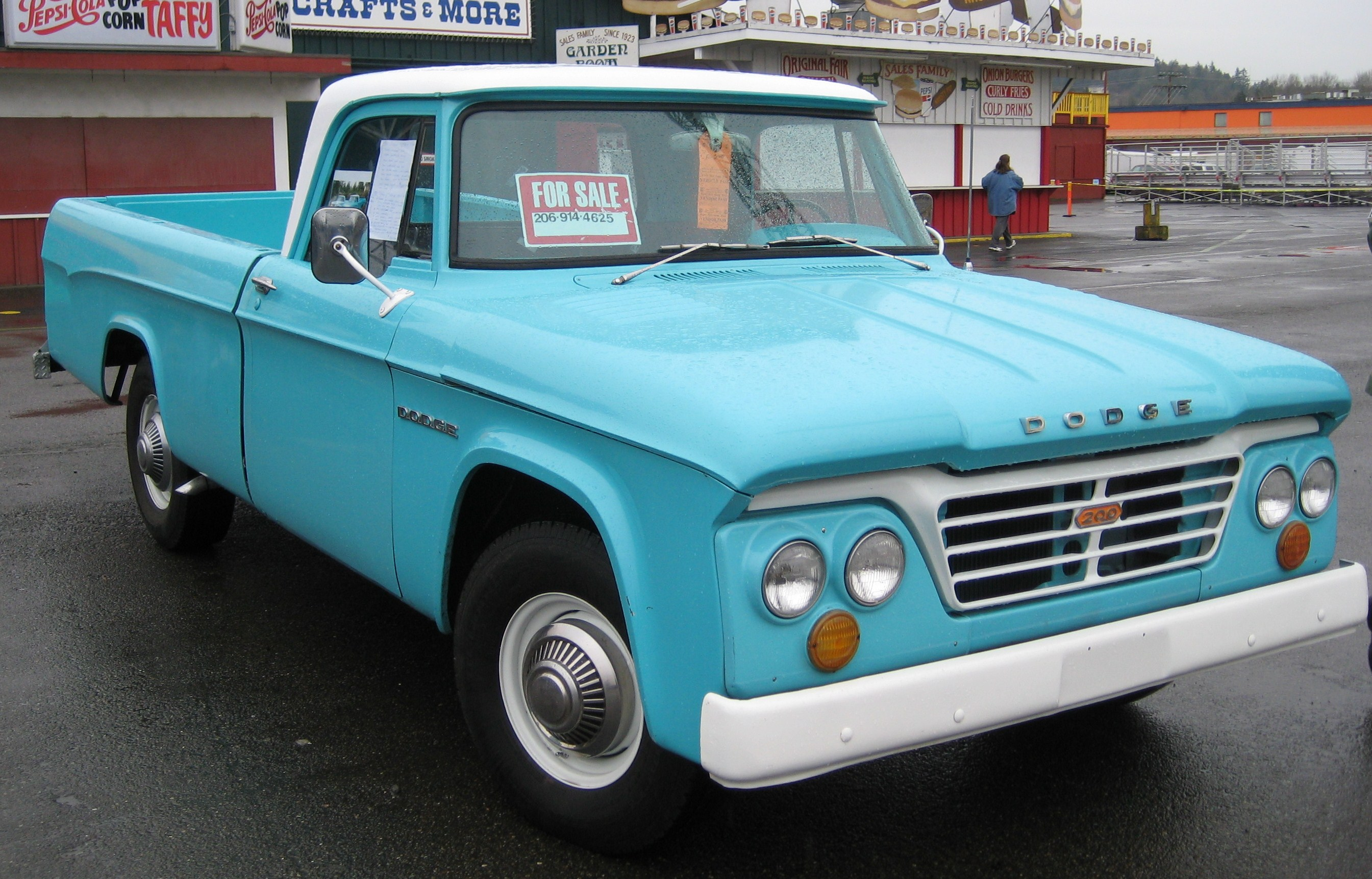
- First generation Dodge D-100

Overview
- Production: 1960–1965

Body and chassis
- Body style: 2/4-door pickup truck

Powertrain
- Engine: 170 cu in (2.8 L) Slant-six I6; 225 cu in (3.7 L) Slant-six I6; 318 cu in (5.2 L) A V8; 413 cu in (6.8 L) RB V8; 426 cu in (7.0 L) RB V8; 354 cu in (5.8 L) Perkins 6.354 diesel I6
- Transmission: 3/4-speed manual; 3-speed push button automatic; 4-speed automatic

Dimensions
- Wheelbase: 114 in (2,896 mm) (regular cab 6.5 ft (2.0 m) bed); 122 in (3,099 mm) (regular cab 8 ft (2.4 m) bed); 133 in (3,378 mm) (regular cab 9 ft (2.7 m) Utiline bed); 146 in (3,708 mm) (crew cab 6.5 ft (2.0 m) bed)

The Chrysler A engine of 318 cu in (5.2 L) was the smallest V8 option; and all of Chrysler's larger engines, with the notable exception of the Chrysler Hemi engine, were available as factory options. The original design was built until the spring of 1965, when the facelifted, single-headlamp version arrived. For 1963, Dodge introduced a four-door crew-cab version of the D series, becoming the first "Big Three" American manufacturer to market a factory-produced truck with two rows of seating (following the 1961 introduction of the International Travelette).

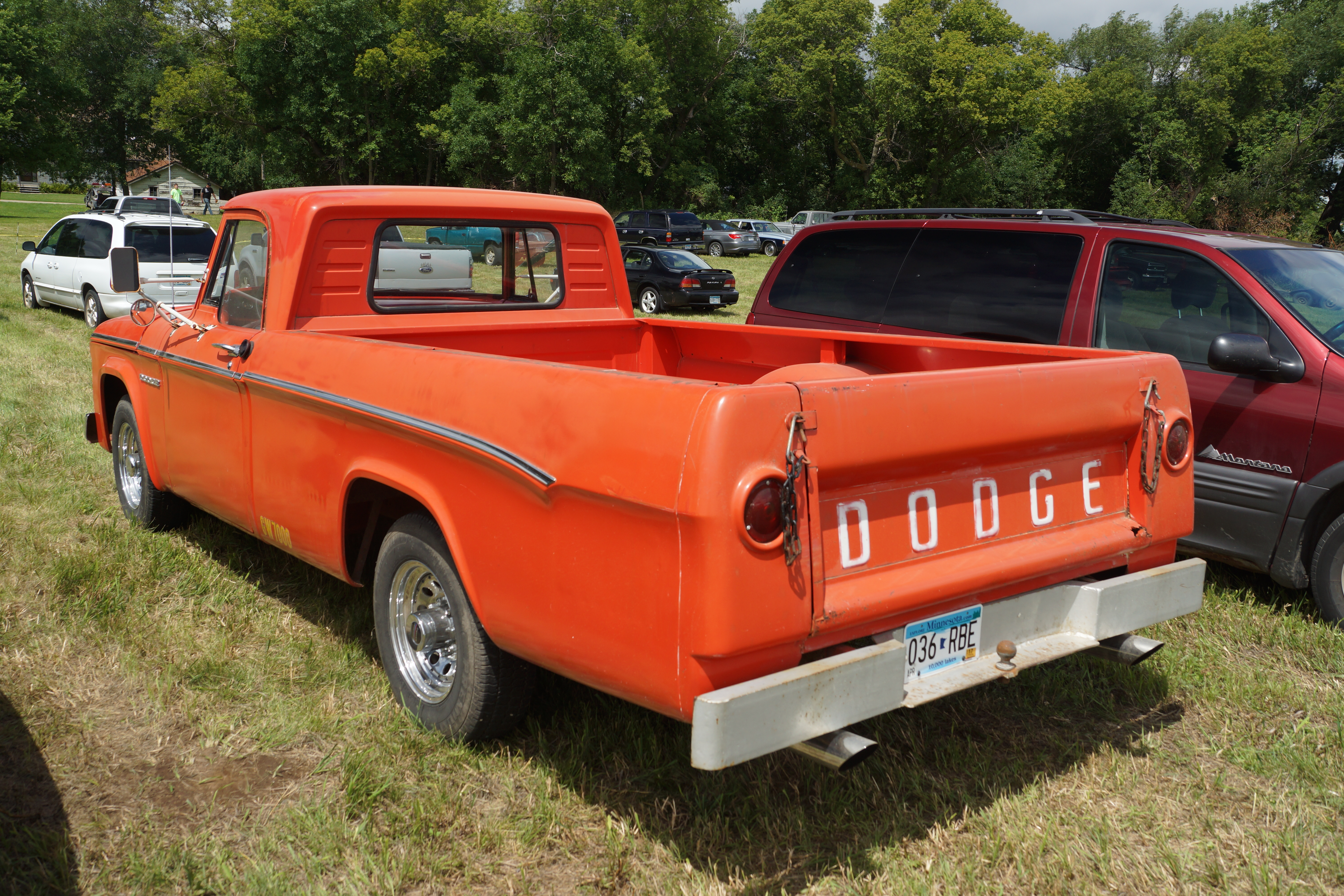
Rear view of a 1964 D-200

Besides straight-sided beds (called Sweptline), the D series also offered step-sided narrow beds (called Utiline) in 6.5 ft (2.0 m) (D-100 only), 8 ft (2.4 m) (D-100 and 200), and 9 ft (2.7 m) (D-300 only) lengths.

A Perkins 354-cubic-inch six-cylinder diesel engine option was offered in the D series for 1962, but was dropped because of lackluster demand. Only about 1,000 were built. This was mainly installed in the heavier-duty, cab-chassis PD500 and PD600 models.

The first generation of the D series was manufactured in Warren, Michigan. They were given the Dodge and Fargo brands. The trucks were produced by the Dodge Division of the Chrysler Corporation.

=== Custom Sports Special and high-performance package ===
1964 saw the introduction of the sporty Custom Sports Special. The Custom Sports Special included bucket seats, console, carpeting and racing stripes. The optional high-performance package could be ordered with a CSS truck or by itself on a base model truck complete with Chrysler's big 413 cu in (6.8 L) wedge-head V8 for 1964 and 426 cu in (7.0 L) V8 for 1965. The 426 cubic inch engine produced 365 hp (272 kW) and 470 lb⋅ft (637 N⋅m) — in line with the muscle-car revolution that was then sweeping Detroit. The high-performance package also included the LoadFlite automatic transmission, a 6000 rpm-rated Sun tachometer with heavy-duty gauges, power steering, dual exhaust and rear axle torque rods (traction bars) sourced from 1961 Imperials. Custom Sports Special trucks were produced from 1964 to 1967. The high-performance package required customized fabrication including tailor-made traction bar brackets, alterations to the frame cross members and an enlarged firewall to make room for the exhaust manifold. The High Performance Package was only offered from 1964 to early 1966.

== Second generation (1965–1971) ==
Second generation
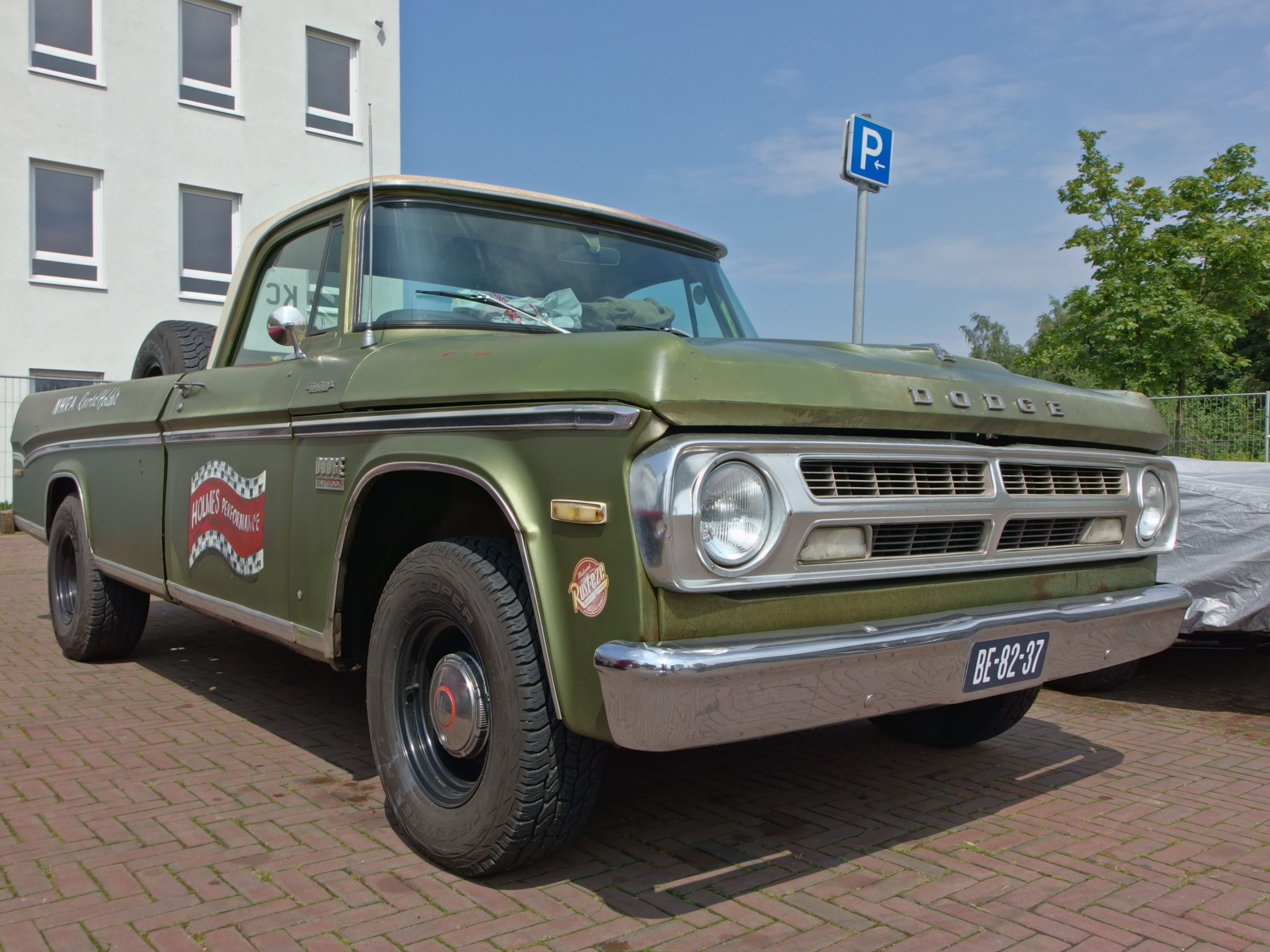
- 1971 Dodge D-100

Overview
- Production: 1965–1971

Body and chassis
- Body style: 2-door pickup truck 4-door pickup truck

Powertrain
- Engine: 225 cu in (3.7 L) Slant-6 I6; 318 cu in (5.2 L) LA V8; 361 cu in (5.9 L) B V8; 383 cu in (6.3 L) B V8; 421 cu in (6.9 L) RB V8; 426 cu in (7.0 L) RB V8; 440 cu in (7.2 L) RB V8
- Transmission: 3/4-speed manual; 3-speed, dash or column mounted automatic

Dimensions
- Wheelbase: 114 in (2,896 mm) (regular cab 6.5 ft (2.0 m) bed); 128 in (3,251 mm) (regular cab 8 ft (2.4 m) bed); 133 in (3,378 mm) (regular cab 9 ft (2.7 m) Utiline bed); 146 in (3,708 mm) (crew cab 6.5 ft (2.0 m) bed)

=== 1965–1967 ===
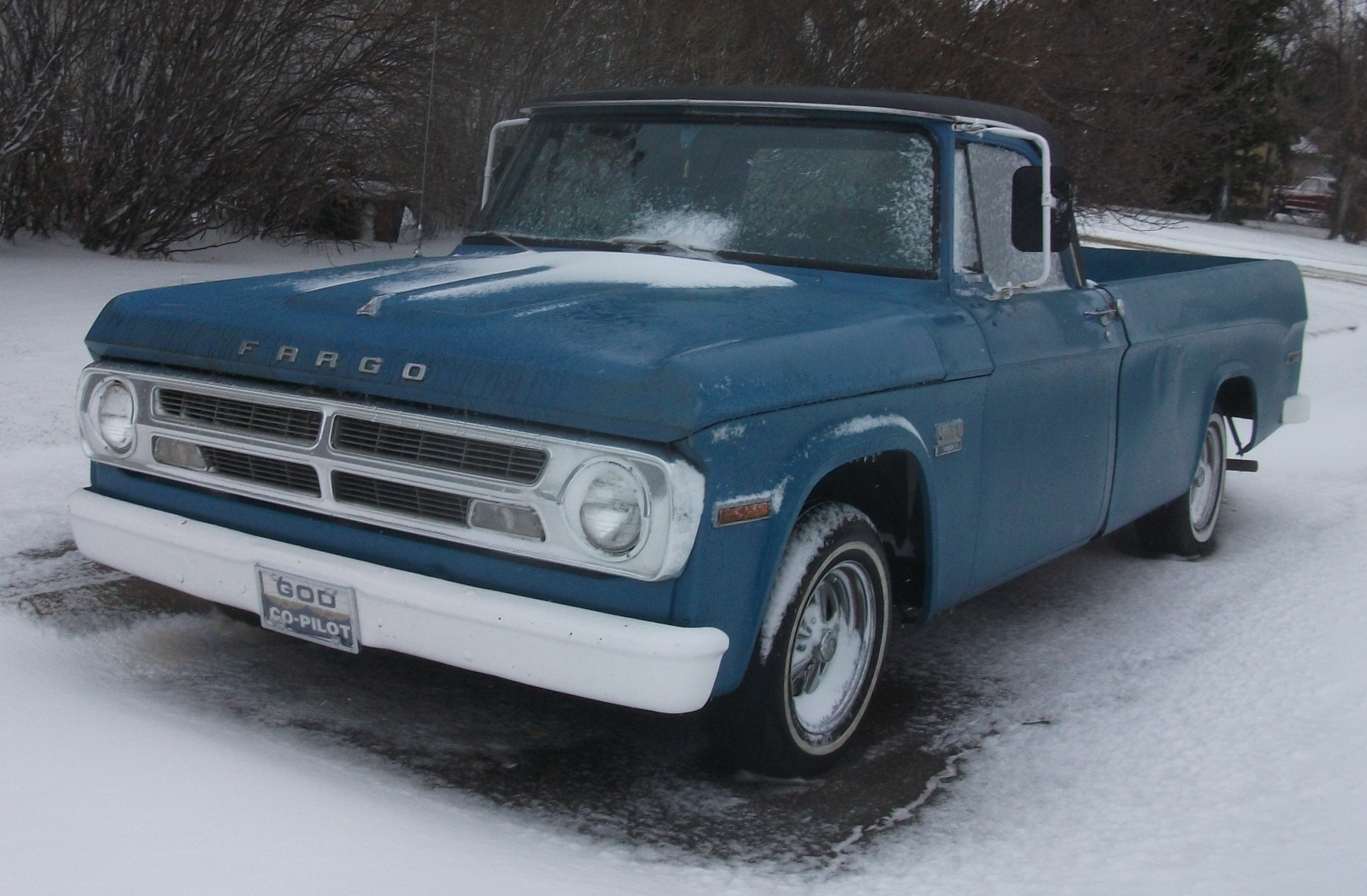
Fargo 100, sold only in Canada as a rebadged version of the Dodge D-series

The D series was mildly redesigned in the spring of 1965, so there are both two-headlight and four-headlight models titled as 1965s. Updates for mid-1965 included a wider tailgate and the replacement of the A-series engines with the updated LA series, as well as a six-inch wheelbase stretch on 8 ft (2.4 m) bed models. In 1967, the D-series trucks received big-block 383 2-barrel engines as a standard option.

From 1965 until the early 1980s, D-series trucks were assembled in Warren, Michigan, by the Chrysler Corporation. Foreign models were manufactured by Automotive Industries Ltd. in Israel at a new factory located at Nazareth-Illit, using straight-four and straight-six gasoline engines mated to a manual transmission. This factory also produced the Jeep Wagoneer SUV for the Israeli army, and British Ford Escort and Ford Transit vehicles for the civilian market. The D-series trucks were made both for the civilian market and for the Israeli Army. The models were D100 and D200 light trucks, D500 truck, and the D600 truck with the straight-six engine and having on-demand four-wheel drive. There was also a bus version made (mainly for army use). This bus was a 20-seat bus built on the chassis of the D500 truck using the straight-four engine with front and rear hydraulic doors, as well as the complete D500 front end and dashboard.

=== 1968–1971 ===
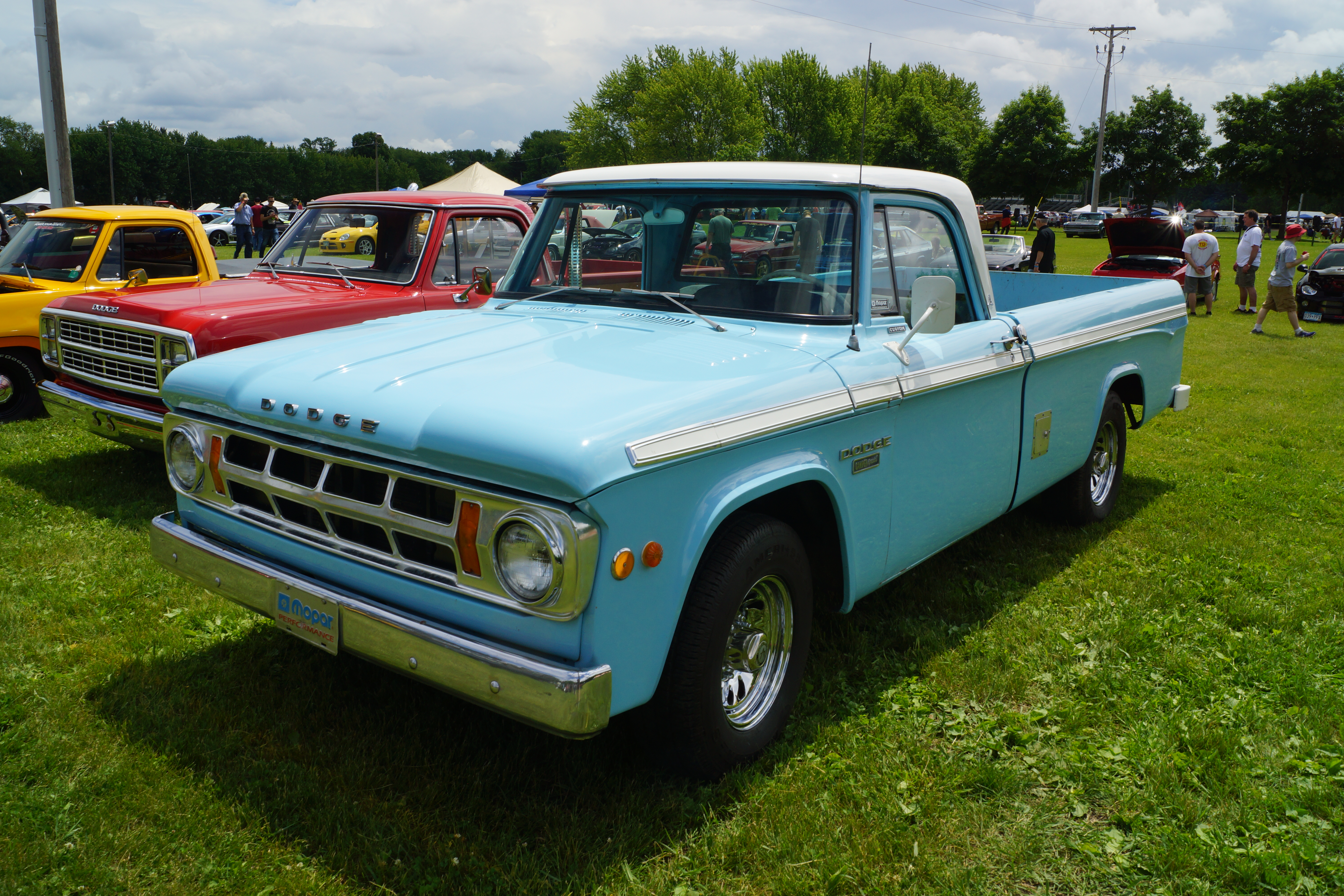
1968 Dodge D-100

The 1968 models received a new front grille—two rows of four holes each. A new Adventurer trim package replaced the old Custom Sports Special; basically, it included a padded front seat with vinyl trim (either full bench or buckets with console) and carpeting, plus other hallmarks such as extra chrome trim and courtesy lighting. This generation continued to be built in South Africa as well. Sold as the D300 or the D500, the lighter model received the 225 Slant-Six, while the heavier-duty D500 had the 318 ci V8. Power outputs are 127 and 177 hp (95 and 132 kW) (net), respectively; SAE claims are 140 and 212 hp.

By 1970, the Adventurer would be expanded into three separate packages: the base Adventurer, the Adventurer Sport and the top-line Adventurer SE. The Adventurer SE included such things as a chrome grille, wood trim on the dashboard, the padded vinyl front seat with color-keyed seatbelts, full courtesy lighting, extra insulation, dual horns, full carpeting, luxury door panel trim, a vinyl-embossed trim strip ran along the sides of the truck, full wheel discs and a woodgrain-insert panel on the tailgate. The 1970 models also featured a new four-section grille (two rows of two holes each).

=== "The Dude" ===
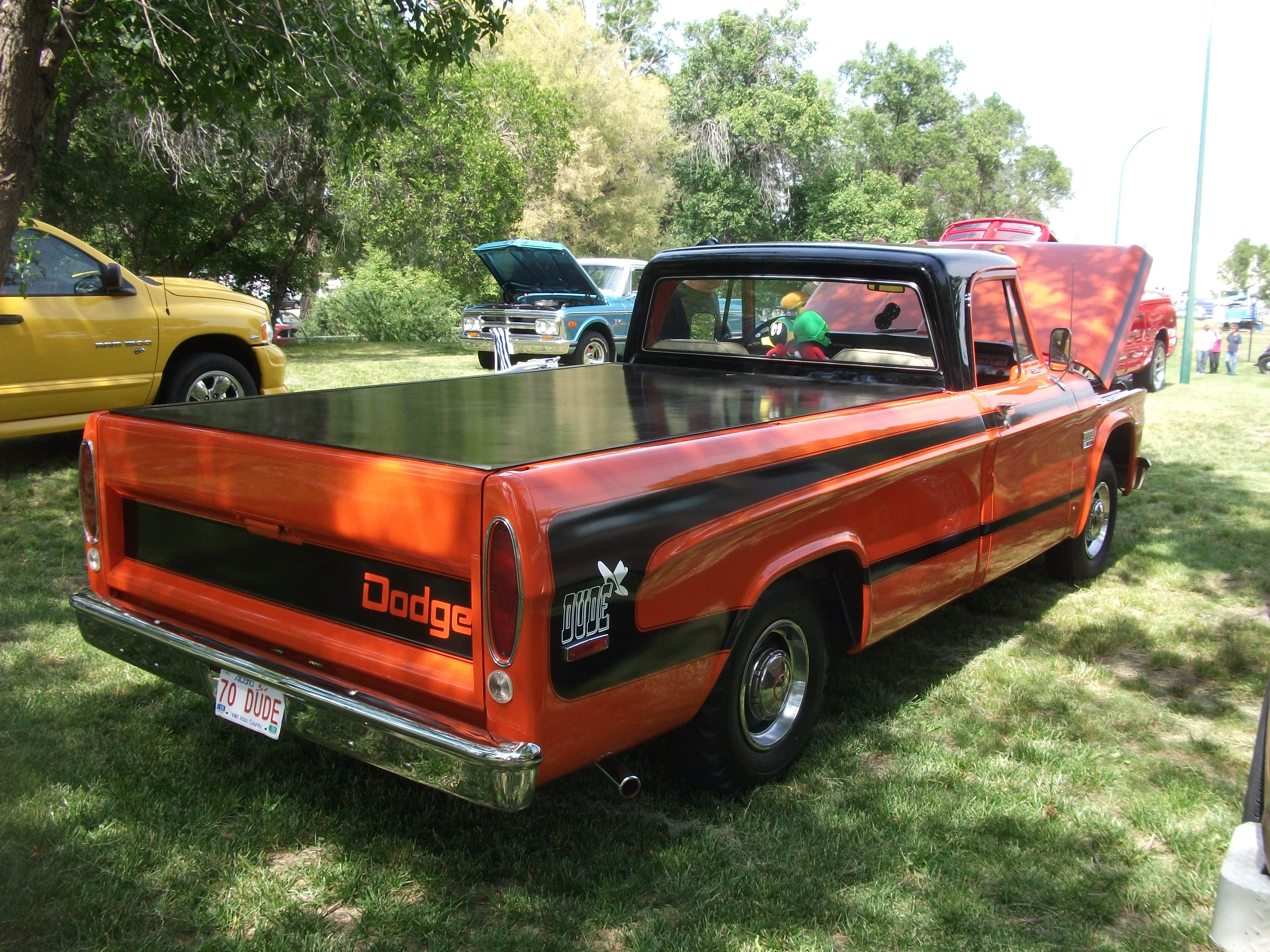
1970 Dodge "The Dude" pickup

In August 1969, the "Dude Sport Trim Package" was released. This was essentially the D100 already in production, with an added black or white body-side "C" stripe decal; a Dodge Dude decal on the box at the rear marker lamps; tail lamp bezel trim; and dog dish hub caps with trim rings. The Dude's tailgate was unique, featuring a Dodge decal on a flat tailgate surface, without the typical tailgate's embossed logo. The Dudes were only offered in the 1970 and 1971 model years and only 1,500 to 2,000 Dudes were produced. Actor Don Knotts promoted The Dude in its marketing campaigns.

== Third generation (1972–1993) ==
Third generation
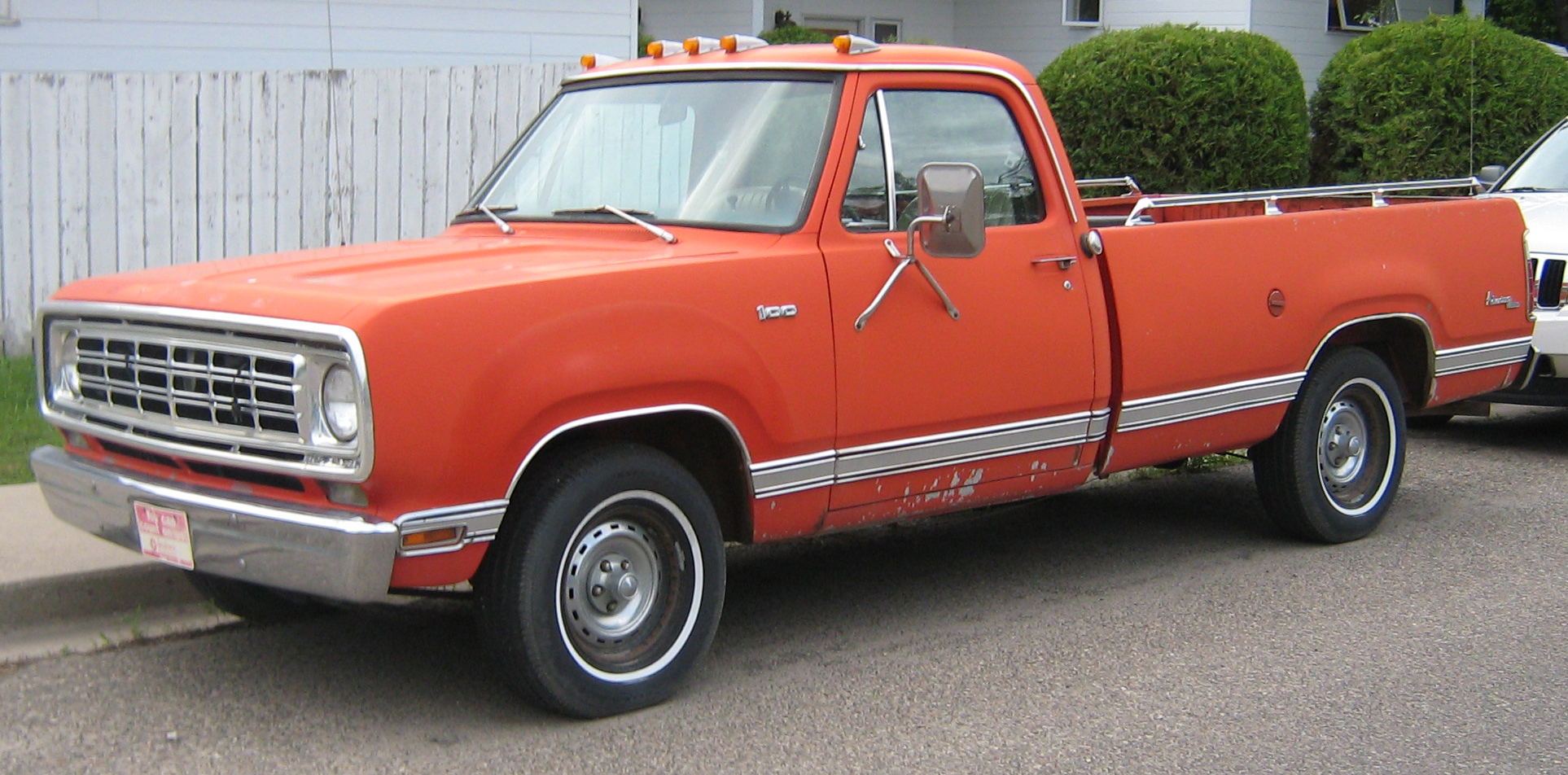
- 1975–1976 Dodge D100 Adventurer Sport

Overview
- Production: 1971–1993

Body and chassis
- Body style: 2-door pickup truck 4-door pickup truck
- Related: Dodge Ramcharger

Powertrain
- Engine: 170 cu in (2.8 L) Slant-6 I6; 225 cu in (3.7 L) Slant-6 I6; 318 cu in (5.2 L) LA V8; 360 cu in (5.9 L) LA V8; 400 cu in (6.6 L) B V8; 440 cu in (7.2 L) RB V8; 243 cu in (4.0 L) 6DR5 I6 Diesel
- Transmission: 3/4-speed manual; 3-speed column-mounted automatic

Dimensions
- Wheelbase: 115 in (2,921 mm) (regular cab 6.5 ft (2.0 m) bed); 131 in (3,327 mm) (regular cab 8 ft (2.4 m) bed); 133 in (3,378 mm) (Club Cab 6.5 ft (2.0 m) bed); 135 in (3,429 mm) (regular cab, chassis cab or 9 ft (2.7 m) Utiline bed, 1972–1975); 149 in (3,785 mm) (crew cab 6.5 ft (2.0 m) bed and Club Cab 8 ft (2.4 m) bed) 159 in (4,039 mm) (regular cab, chassis cab only) 165 in (4,191 mm) (crew cab 8 ft (2.4 m) bed)

A redesign of the D series for the 1972 model year introduced a more rounded look. This redesign, which lasted until 1980 with minor changes, included new features such as a double-wishbone independent front suspension on 2WD models (replacing the leaf-sprung I-beam straight axle) and pocketed taillights (the distinctive reverse-on-top lights were recessed to .25 in (6.4 mm) to avoid damage in loading docks and confined spaces). Styling cues, such as the scalloped hood and rounded fender wells, were similar to the rounded, smooth look of the 1971 Plymouth Satellite. These trucks were built with a considerable amount of galvanized steel to resist corrosion, making them very durable. Some other changes included a redesigned interior with recessed gauges, larger pedals and glove box, standard foot-operated parking brake, longer wheelbases (by up to 5 inches), larger brakes, and on Sweptline models, a bed floor with no exposed bolts as well as an optional tool storage box. For the first time, air conditioning and cruise control were optional. Trim levels included Custom, Adventurer, Adventurer Sport, and Adventurer SE.

The 1972 D series was made famous in the television show Emergency!, where a D300 chassis cab was the featured paramedic rescue squad vehicle for all seven seasons.

Dodge pioneered the extended-cab pickup with the introduction of the Club Cab for 1973. Available with either a 6.5 ft (2.0 m) (on D100) or 8 ft (2.4 m) Sweptline bed (on D100 or D200), the Club Cab was a two-door cab lengthened by 18 inches with small rear windows, providing 34 cubic feet more space behind the seats than the standard cab. Inward-facing jump seats were available, providing room for five passengers. Other changes for 1973 included front disc brakes on all 2WD models and an optional electronic ignition system for all engines.

For 1974, the grille was refreshed and the "Dyna-Trac" dual-rear-wheel option became available for the D300 Sweptline in conventional cab and Club Cab models (the latter could also be ordered without a pickup bed), featuring a 10,000-pound GVWR and a 6,900-pound rear axle. The 440-cubic-inch engine replaced the 400-cubic-inch unit as an option. The Club Cab became available on W100 and W200 models, while the electronic ignition system was made standard for all gasoline-powered Dodge trucks. Additionally, the standard fuel tank was relocated from inside the cab to the frame.

For 1975, the instrument panel and side moldings were refreshed. On 4WD models, the front drum brakes were swapped for discs, and the suspension on W100 and W200 models was reworked for a smoother ride, with longer leaf springs, softer spring rates, and new shock absorbers. A full-time transfer case became standard, and the 440 engine and sway bar became optional for 4WD models. To meet EPA emissions standards, trucks up to 6,000 pounds GVWR were equipped with catalytic converters. The nine-foot Utiline bed on D/W 300 models was discontinued.

For 1976, the D/W series saw several mechanical changes: the frame-mounted fuel tank was raised, Sweptline boxes received enhanced corrosion protection, and a glide-out spare tire carrier became available. The rear suspension was revised for added stability under heavy loads, and 4WD models featured raised tie rods for higher ground clearance. Bench seats were modified with hinges for easier access to the rear of the cab. For models up to 5,500 pounds GVWR, a four-speed manual overdrive transmission was introduced with the slant-six for improved fuel economy. Additionally, the 400-cubic-inch engine was made available again. For the first time, all models (except crew cabs) could be ordered with a "Sky Lite" sunroof, featuring tinted safety glass and capable of operating in three ways: fully latched, partially open or vented (with hinges positioned closer to the top of the windshield), or fully open.

The D/W series received a facelift for 1977, which included an updated grille with rectangular turn signal lights and the "DODGE" name embossed at the top. The body moldings were also refreshed, while the Adventurer Sport trim was discontinued. The interior saw updates with a two-tone instrument panel and new seat and door trim. A new "Fuel Pacer" feature was introduced to help drivers monitor fuel consumption. The 225-cubic-inch slant-six engine used in models above 6,000 pounds GVWR was updated with a two-barrel carburetor. In mid-1977, the D100/W100 models above 6,000 pounds GVWR were redesignated as D150/W150. A new W400 chassis-cab model with an 11,000-pound GVWR and dual rear wheels became available, with the 360-cubic-inch V8 standard and larger V8 options.

For 1978, a tilt steering wheel was introduced, and for the first time, a factory-installed trailer hitch was available. The Sweptline bed was made available with the D300 crew cab. The transfer case shifter on 4WD models was updated with a positive range detent to prevent accidental engagement. Club Cab models could now be equipped with bucket seats, and more radio options were offered, including CB, stereo, and 8-track players. All models could now be had with the Adventurer SE trim. A 243-cubic-inch diesel engine was available in D/W 150 and 200 models (except in California). Additionally, an RD200 pickup designed for railway service was introduced, featuring narrower tread, a heavier frame, the 360-cubic-inch V8 with automatic transmission, and increased overall height, as well as a new D400 chassis-cab model with a 10,500-pound GVWR.

For 1979, the front end was refreshed with a new hood, cowl top panel, grille, and quad rectangular headlights on higher trims. The Sweptline tailgate and cowl side outer panels now featured galvanized steel. The interior of Adventurer SE models was upgraded, and Club Cab models now featured available swing-out rear quarter windows. Power door locks became available for the first time, and air conditioning was offered on six-cylinder models. The in-cab fuel tank, 400- and 440-cubic-inch V8 engines, and chassis-cab models below 8,600 pounds GVWR were discontinued. The 225-cubic-inch slant-six was no longer available on W200 or D/W 300 models, and all D/W 300 models came equipped with the 360-cubic-inch V8.

For 1980, the only exterior change was that the grille openings were painted black. In response to the 1979 oil crisis, the three-speed manual transmission was discontinued, and the NP435 became the standard transmission. The 225-cubic-inch slant-six was also discontinued on Club Cabs and crew cabs. The full-time transfer case was replaced with a part-time transfer case. The D100 models merged into the D150 to become the entry-level model. For the first time, power windows on the front doors became available.

=== Special models ===
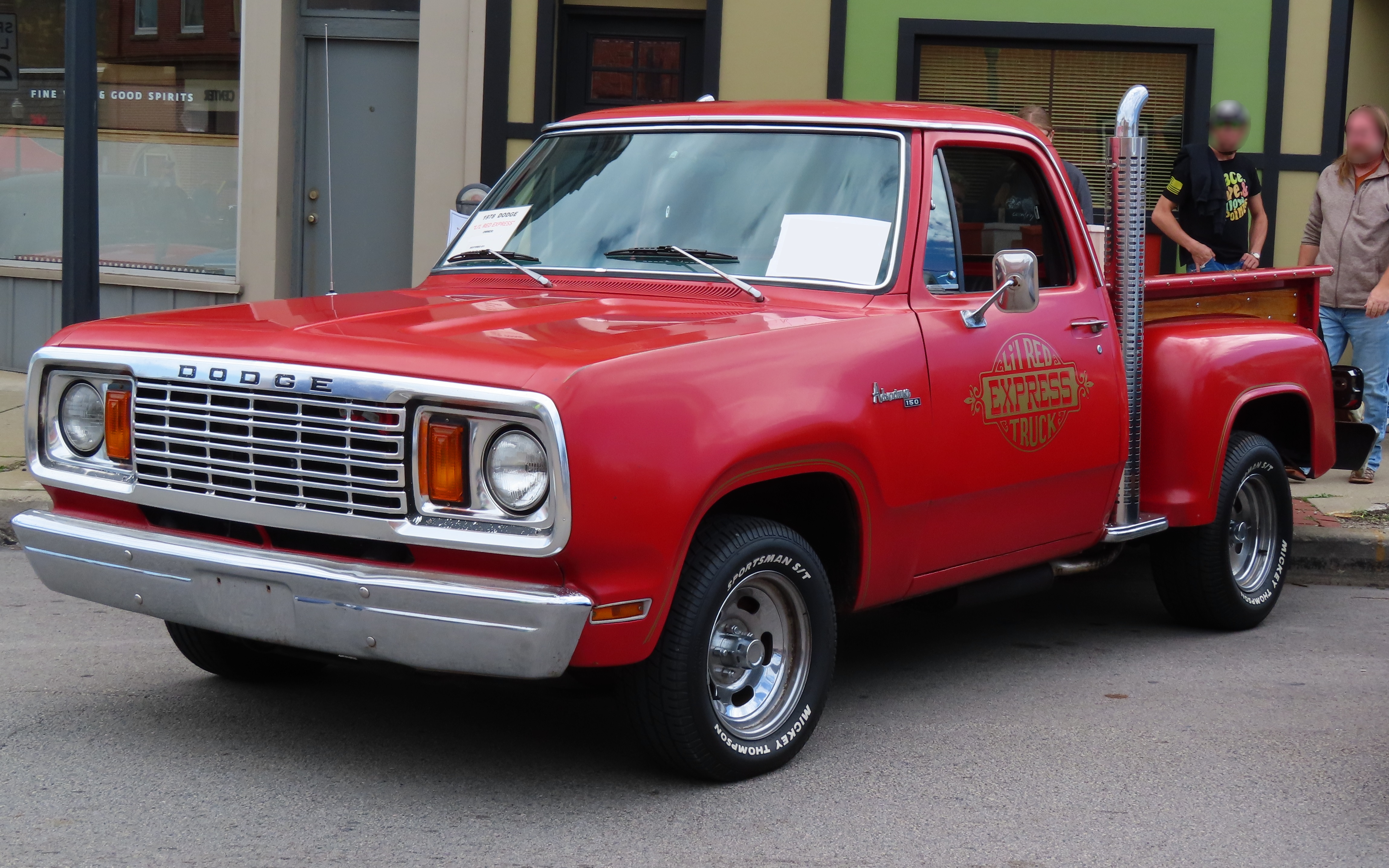
1978 Li'l Red Express truck

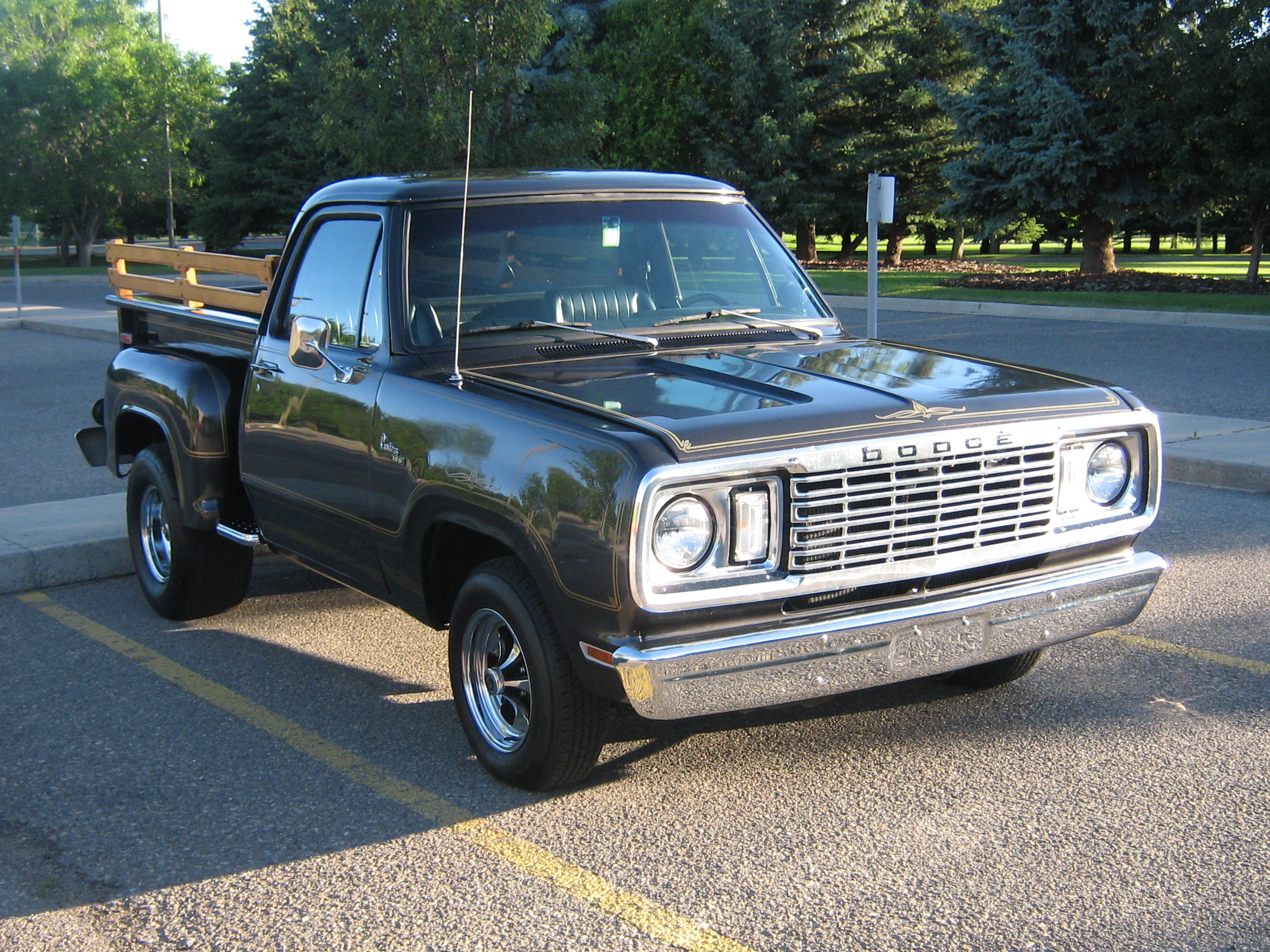
1977 Dodge Warlock

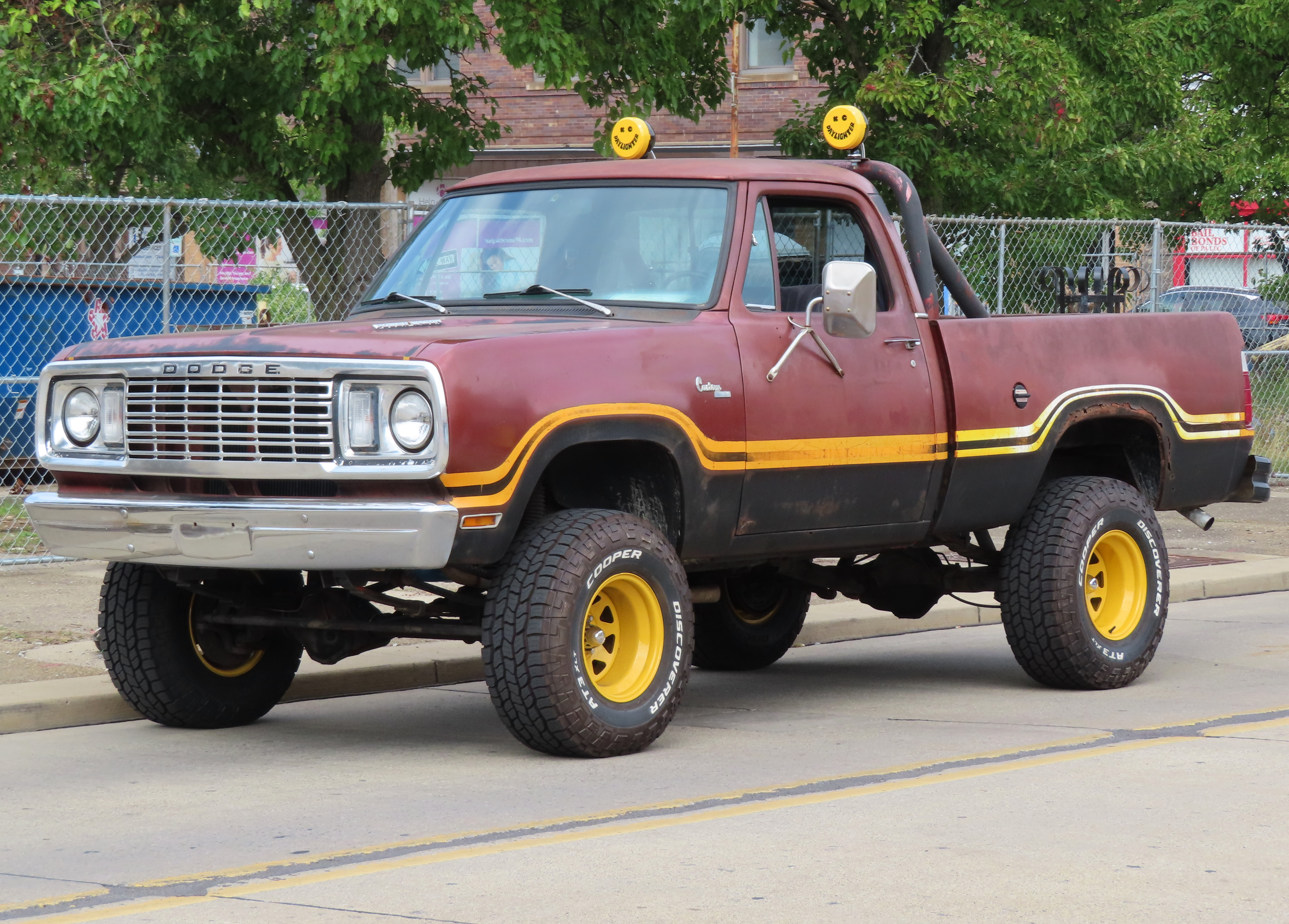
1977 Dodge W100 Macho Power Wagon

Notable models produced during this era were the 1978–1979 Li'l Red Express, the Warlock, the Macho Power Wagon, the Macho Power Wagon Top Hand, Macho Power Wagon Palomino, and the Adventurer.

The Warlock, as part of Dodge's "adult toys" line from the late 1970s, is a short wheelbase truck produced in limited production in 1976 and regular production from 1977 to 1979. Warlocks came in black, red, green, and blue; however, other colors could be special-ordered. Its main draw was being a factory customized truck, also known as a "trick truck," and was designed to appeal to young 4×4 buyers. The Warlock featured custom gold wheels, wide tires, bucket seats, and a Utiline bed with oak racks. Optional equipment included five-spoke wheels, bucket seats, tinted glass, chrome rear bumper, and power steering. All had black interiors, with gold accents on the dash and the doors, and a "tuff" steering wheel. The exterior was accented by gold pin striping around the wheel wells and the body lines. The pin striping continued inside onto the doors, dashboard, and instrument panel. On the 1976 model, Dodge was printed in gold on the tailgate, while Warlock was printed in gold on the tailgate through 1978; the 1979 model instead had "Warlock II" printed.

The colors of the Dodge Macho Power Wagon Palomino were the same as a Palomino horse (all Li'l Red Express trucks were Adventurers, but not vice versa). The Li'l Red Express was not available for sale in California, Florida, Maryland, Oregon, or Washington state, and did not meet special noise standards in certain locations. Because of this, the Midnite Express was born.

The Midnite Express was not a factory option like the Li'l Red Express; it was a dealer-installed package. Dealers that could not sell the Li'l Red Express used high-optioned Warlocks, repainted them metallic black, and ordered all of the Li'l Red Express parts through their parts department. The Midnite Express was available for the 1978 model year only. This truck was equipped much like the Li'l Red Express with exhaust stacks, wheels, and gold pinstriping. The Midnite Express was painted black instead of red and featured a "Midnite Express Truck" decal on the door. Most Midnite Express trucks were powered by the 440 engine, instead of the 360 like the Li'l Red Express. All of these trucks were considered "lifestyle" pickups and were marketed to an audience that wanted specialty, personal-use trucks.

Between 1976 and 1977, about 44,000 D-series trucks entered military service as the M880 series CUCV. The CUCVs were based on the W200 and powered by a 318 V8 mated to a Torqueflite 727 3-speed automatic transmission. There was also a 4×2-only version called the M890.

=== Diesel ===
The 1978 models also saw the introduction of the second diesel-powered Dodge pickup truck. Available as an economy choice in the D/W 150 and 200 trucks was Mitsubishi's 6DR5 4.0-litre, inline six-cylinder naturally-aspirated diesel, rated at 105 hp (78 kW) at 3500 rpm, and 169 lb⋅ft (229 N⋅m) of torque at 2200 rpm. The diesel used standard Dodge manual and automatic transmissions via a custom adapter plate which had the B/RB Big Block V8 bolt pattern. This rare factory option, VIN code H, was the result of the 1973 oil crisis and the collaboration of Chrysler and Mitsubishi. The engine, while being trustworthy and having far better economy than any other engine in the Dodge lineup at the time, suffered from low power output and was considered to be underpowered by American standards, despite having been previously used in the Japanese 3.5-ton cab-over Mitsubishi T44 Jupiter Truck and in industrial applications. It was not available in California. Because of the low sales, it was phased out after only 2,835 examples had been built. It was listed for 1979 as well but it is uncertain whether any were built.

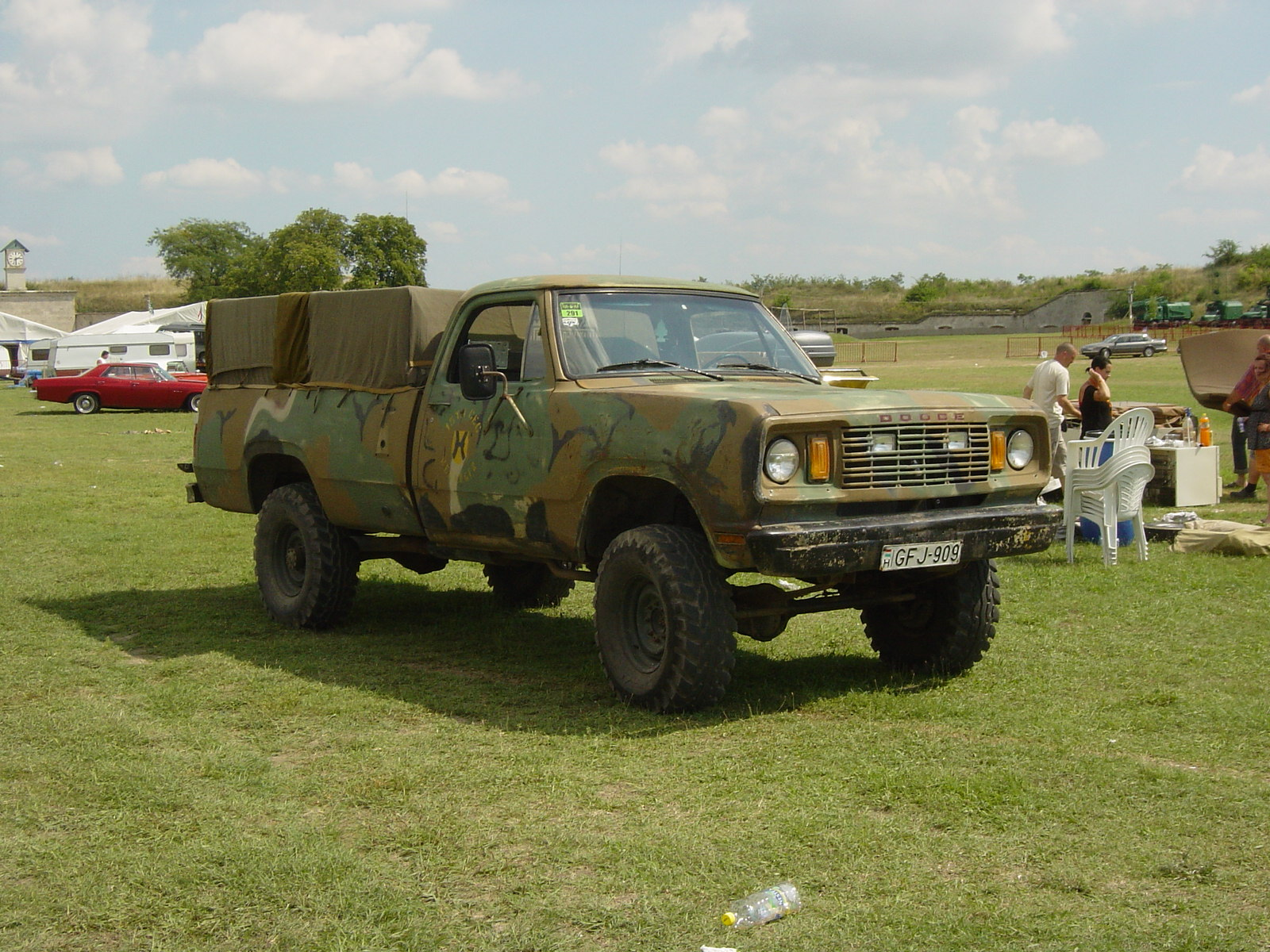
D200-based M880 CUCV

=== Dodge Ram (1981–1993) ===
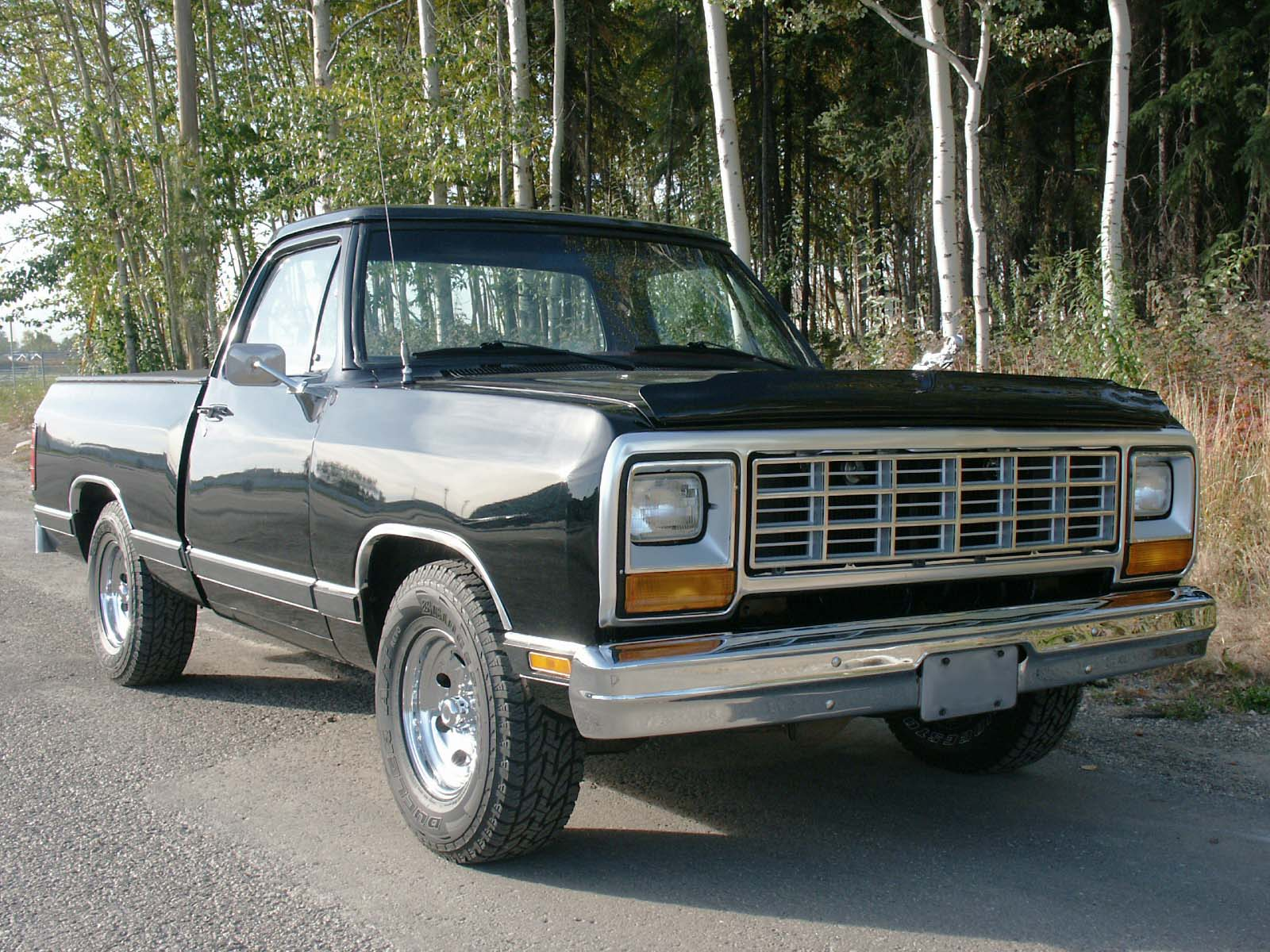
1983 Dodge Ram D150 short bed

This final generation received a facelift in October 1980 when the D series was rebadged as the Dodge Ram pickup around when Lee Iacocca took charge of the ailing Chrysler Corporation. Such things including an embossed "DODGE RAM" name on the tailgate along with other obvious changes like the grille and hood, the taillights, and the entire interior. More subtle was the addition of a "shoulder" line reminiscent of the GM competition. Beginning in 1982, even more corrosion-resistant steel was used in the construction of the trucks. This body style continued until 1993 and many of these vehicles are still on the road. Many body panels are interchangeable for all models from 1971 to 1993, so it is not uncommon to see a "hybrid" with, as an example, a 1978 grille mounted with a 1974 hood and a 1991 cab. Sometimes, the bed is swapped with a moving-truck style box. In most jurisdictions, the year is dictated by the year of the truck's chassis regardless of the body which has been bolted to it. Also kept was the narrow Utiline bed that dated back to the 1940s; this was dropped in 1985. Throttle-body injection was introduced in 1988.

A narrower range of engines was offered: the base power plant was the 225 cu in (3.7 L) slant-6, now with top-fed hydraulic tappets, and the 318 cu in (5.2 L) and 360 cu in (5.9 L) LA-series V8s. The slant-6 was replaced by the 3.9 L (237 cu in) V6 for 1988; in 1992, it and the V8s became Magnum engines. The 6BT 5.9 L (360 cu in) 12-valve Cummins B-series diesel engine became an option in 1989.

Sales were good during the Sweptline era and into the late 1970s. A combination of stagnant styling that was nearly two decades old plus brand loyalty primarily to Chevrolet and Ford during the 1980s and 1990s reduced sales volume for the first-generation Dodge Ram. A wholly new Dodge Ram was released for the 1994 model year.

== Engines ==
Years available	Engine	Displacement	Output		Notes
Years available	Engine	Displacement	Horsepower*†	Torque*†	Notes
Six-cylinder engines
1961–1967	Chrysler RG Slant 6	170 cu in (2.8 L)	105 hp (78 kW)	180 lb⋅ft (244 N⋅m)	1-barrel carb
1961–1987	Chrysler RG Slant 6	225 cu in (3.7 L)	145 hp (108 kW)	215 lb⋅ft (292 N⋅m)	1-barrel carb
1988–1993	Chrysler LA V6	239 cu in (3.9 L)	180 hp (134 kW)	195 lb⋅ft (264 N⋅m)	TBI
V8 engines
1961–1970	Chrysler B V8	361 cu in (5.9 L)	295 hp (220 kW)	390 lb⋅ft (529 N⋅m)	2-barrel carb
1961–1978	Chrysler RB V8	413 cu in (6.8 L)	340 hp (254 kW) (1961–1962); 360 hp (268 kW) (1963–1971); 255 hp (190 kW) (1972–1979)	480 lb⋅ft (651 N⋅m) (1961–1962); 495 lb⋅ft (671 N⋅m) (1963–1971); 410 lb⋅ft (556 N⋅m) (1972–1979)	
1963–1971	Chrysler B V8	383 cu in (6.3 L)	330 hp (246 kW)	460 lb⋅ft (624 N⋅m)	
1963–1966	Chrysler RB V8	426 cu in (7.0 L)	373 hp (278 kW) (1961–1962); 415 hp (309 kW) (1963–1966)	455 lb⋅ft (617 N⋅m) (1961–1962); 480 lb⋅ft (651 N⋅m) (1963–1966)	
1965–1978	Chrysler RB V8	440 cu in (7.2 L)	375 hp (280 kW) (1965–1971); 225 hp (168 kW) (1972–1978)	480 lb⋅ft (651 N⋅m) (1965–1971); 345 lb⋅ft (468 N⋅m) (1972–1978)	2-barrel carb (1965–1971)
1967–1993	Chrysler LA V8	318 cu in (5.2 L)	230 hp (172 kW) (1967–1971); 150 hp (112 kW) (1972–1977); 135 hp (101 kW) (1978–1987); 170 hp (127 kW) (1988–1993)	340 lb⋅ft (461 N⋅m) (1967–1971); 260 lb⋅ft (353 N⋅m) (1972–1977); 235 lb⋅ft (319 N⋅m) (1978–1987); 245 lb⋅ft (332 N⋅m) (1988–1993)	TBI (1988–1993)
1971–1993	Chrysler LA V8	360 cu in (5.9 L)	170 hp (127 kW); 193 hp (144 kW) (1988–1993)	305 lb⋅ft (414 N⋅m); 285 lb⋅ft (386 N⋅m) (1988–1993)	TBI (1988–1993)
1972–1978	Chrysler B V8	400 cu in (6.6 L)	185 hp (138 kW); 205 hp (153 kW); 250 hp (186 kW)	305 lb⋅ft (414 N⋅m); 310 lb⋅ft (420 N⋅m); 410 lb⋅ft (556 N⋅m)	2-barrel carb; 4-barrel carb w/ single exhaust; 4-barrel carb w/ dual exhaust
Diesel engines
1962-1963	Perkins 6.354 I6	354 cu in (5.8 L)	120 hp (89 kW)	260 lb⋅ft (353 N⋅m)	Non-turbo
1978-1979	Mitsubishi Fuso 6DR5 I6	243 cu in (4.0 L)	105 hp (78 kW)	169 lb⋅ft (229 N⋅m)	Non-turbo
1989–1993	Cummins B-series I6	358 cu in (5.9 L)	160 hp (119 kW)	400 lb⋅ft (542 N⋅m)	Turbo
*Horsepower and torque ratings are for engines equipped with a four-barrel carburetor unless otherwise noted
†Horsepower and torque ratings are net output after 1971 model year.

== See also ==
- Fargo Trucks
