= Willem Weertman =

American engineer

- Education: Yale University (1947)
- Occupation: Engineer
- Known for: Chrysler Corporation

Willem Weertman is an American engineer known for his work as an engineer at Chrysler Corporation, where he was actively involved in the creation of many of the company's most famous engines, including the Slant Six, 2.2 four, and LA V8 (318, 360). He graduated from Yale University with a bachelor of engineering degree in 1947 before joining the Chrysler Institute of Engineering. In 1949, he started work at the Plymouth Assembly Plant before spending 1950–1952 with the Navy in the Korean War. In 1954, Weertman became the first resident engineer for the Plymouth Mound Road V8 engine plant, which started producing A-engines in 1955. In December 1955, Weertman was promoted up to the Engine Design Department of Chrysler's Central Engineering department and assigned a title of Manager - Engine Design. In this capacity he worked on the Chrysler B engine and Slant Six, which would become known for its durability and at the time was considered to have high performance for its size. Valiants powered by this engine took first through seventh place in the first and only NASCAR sanctioned compact-car race.

After the success of these engines, Weertman was promoted to Assistant Chief Engineer-Engine Design. He worked on the successful adaptation of the Chrysler A engine to a new lightweight casting design, which incorporated other improvements as well, and was designated the Chrysler LA engine; this series was made from 1964 through 1993, with a major redesign during those years resulting in SMPI "Magnum" engines which continued until 2002, while a racing engine based on the design is still made, as is the derivative V-10 all-alloy engine which is in every Dodge Viper to this day. An iron V-10 was available for HD pickup trucks, filling in for the B and RB engines which were discontinued after 1978. Weertman also had a major influence on the overhead valve straight-six engines made and sold in Australia known as the Hemi Six. Originally destined for US light truck duty (which never happened), these engines were designed primarily for performance and light weight; a Valiant Charger equipped with the largest of the Hemi Sixes was actually faster than the same car powered by a larger V8 engine, and set a local-production acceleration record that endured until 1988.

Following this, Weertman was promoted to Chief Engineer - Engine Design and Development, a position which he held until retirement. From this point he worked mainly on four cylinder engines, as well as a V6 adaptation of the successful LA design for the Dodge Dakota. Weertman retired from Chrysler Corporation after forty years but remained active, producing a 400-page book covering every engine made by Chrysler from 1922 until the company was taken over in 1998, "Chrysler Engines 1922-1998," published by the Society of Automotive Engineers.

== Relevant Links ==
- Weertman, Willem (2008). Chrysler Engines 1922-1998. Warrendale, PA: SAE International. p. 419. ISBN 978-0-7680-1642-0.
- "Willem Weertman - Chrysler engine creator - personal and engine chronology". Allpar.
- "Willem Weertman - Chrysler Chief Engineer, Engine Design and Development (Interview)". allpar.
