= Tom Hoover (engineer) =

Tom Hoover was an American automotive engineer associated with the Chrysler Motor Corporation. He was the creator of the 426 Hemi, 413 Max wedge, and helped create the Slant Six hyper pak, the sonoramic commando engine, and many high performance engine principles. The 426 Hemi has been the basis for most top fuel dragsters since its conception.

== Early life ==
Hoover was born on November 28, 1929, in Huntingdon, Pennsylvania. Before pioneering the Chrysler race division, he studied at Juniata College. He subsequently joined the Pennsylvania national guard and was drafted into the U.S. Army to be deployed in the Korean War. He remained in the army until April 1952, achieving the rank of sergeant; he received a Korean service medal with three bronze campaign stars and was honorably discharged. On his return to the United States, he attained an undergraduate's degree in physics and a master's degree in engineering at Pennsylvania State University. In 1955, he started working at Chrysler, and subsequently enrolled in the Chrysler Institute of Engineering to obtain his masters in automotive engineering.

== "High and Mighty" ==
Hoover developed an interest in racing after attending events with his colleagues. Him and eight other Chrysler engineers started assembling an experimental race car that became known as "High and Mighty". This prototype was a 1949 Plymouth Business Coupe equipped with a 354 hemi engine. The intake and exhaust systems were the most experimental parts of the car. The intake manifold stuck out the hood and over the roof of the car, measuring 48 inches overall. The manifold was a scrap left over from an engine performance study which measured the wave tuning effects of specific intake manifold runner lengths. It also sported trumpet-like horns for each cylinder instead of a regular exhaust manifold or header. Hoover got the idea from a theory in Norton Motorcycle Technical Paper. The concept would not be used outside of racing engines for more than a decade afterward. It was said to be the loudest vehicle out of all of the competitors because of its unique exhaust.

== Hyper-pak slant six ==
After the success of the ram induction, Hoover helped with Chrysler's compact division of racing. He created the hyper-pak slant six that ran a long intake manifold, much like ram induction, that took up the majority of the engine bay. It sported a single four barrel carburetor and had a more aggressive camshaft than the original design. With these modifications, they managed to add an extra 50 horsepower, for a total of 200. "Plymouth Valiant that was so successful in its first race outing in the compact class at Daytona in 1960, powering the first seven finishers, that NASCAR's inaugural compact race was also its last".

== 426 Hemi ==
With the lack-luster performance of the wedge engines, Hoover conducted a full redesign of the engine. He scrapped the wedge cylinder head design in favor of the reliable Hemi heads. With this modification came slight changes to the block and camshaft with a significant increase in power as well as an increase in overall size, thus reviving the Chrysler Hemi Engine. This increased size and power gave it the nickname the "elephant motor". With this engine, Chrysler won the 1964 Indy 500 by such an extensive margin that the National Hot Rod Association (NHRA) changed their rules to disallow non-production (unorderable) vehicles, so that in order to race, cars needed to be able to be ordered from the factory and have at least 500 vehicles manufactured.

Because of this, Chrysler boycotted the race until 1966, when they released a street version of the 426 hemi that met the new race requirements. The street hemi had a smaller camshaft, a smaller exhaust manifold, an inline dual carburetor setup rather than the previous cross ram, and a 10.25:1 compression ratio instead of 12.5:1. The street hemi was popular with the public, and in 1966, Chrysler sold 2,729 hemi cars. The hemi was held to its high standard, despite being watered down, winning 27 races in 1967.
