= Chrysler Slant-6 engine =

Chrysler Slant Six (G, RG) engine
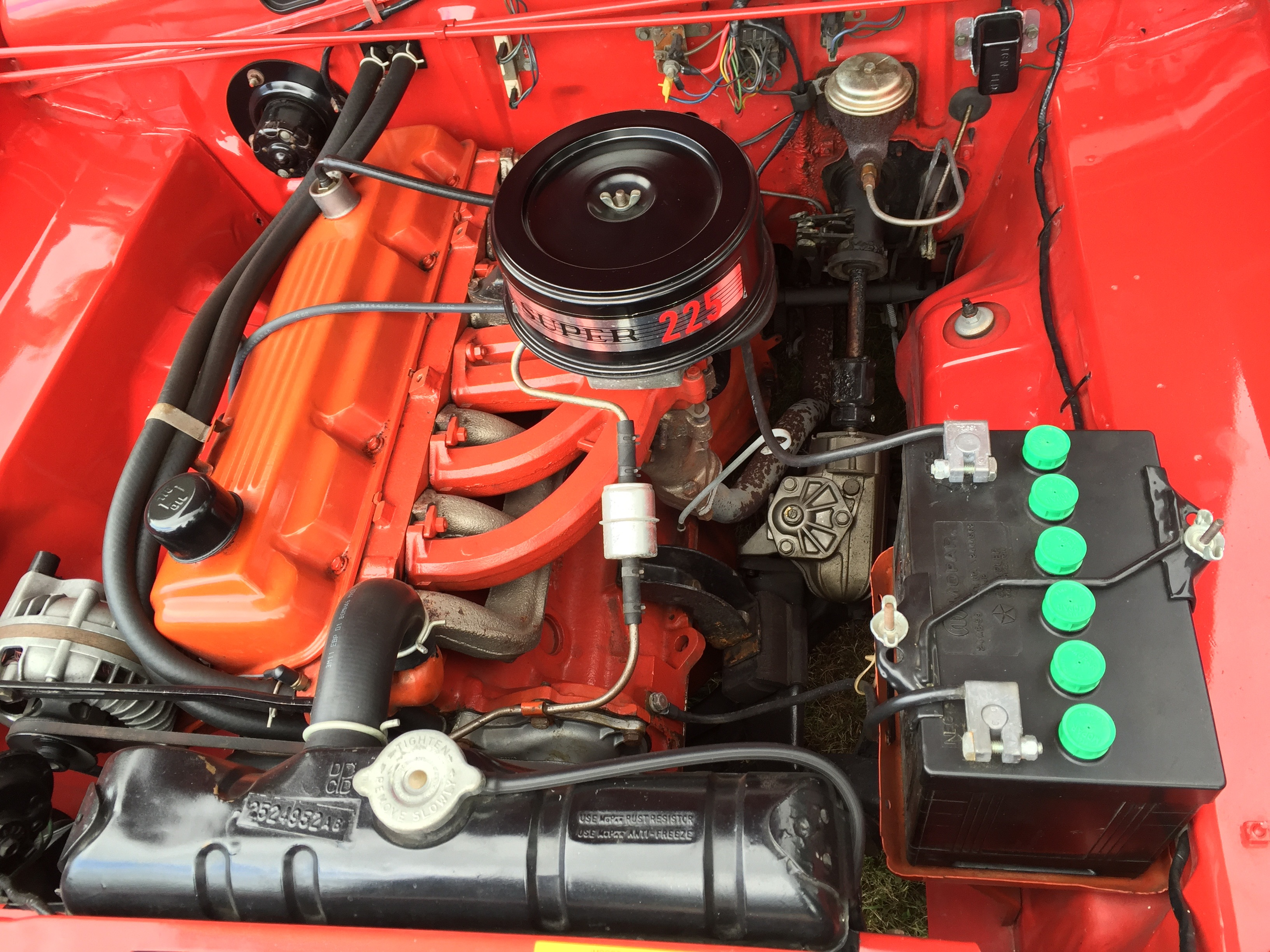
- "Super 225" in a 1965 Plymouth Barracuda

Overview
- Manufacturer: Chrysler Corporation
- Production: 1959–2000; Indianapolis Foundry; Trenton Engine Plant

Layout
- Configuration: Straight-6
- Displacement: 170 cu in (2.8 L); 198 cu in (3.2 L); 225 cu in (3.7 L)
- Cylinder bore: 3 2/5 in (86.4 mm)
- Piston stroke: 3 1/8 in (79.4 mm); 3 16/25 in (92.5 mm); 4 1/8 in (104.8 mm)
- Cylinder block material: Cast iron Aluminum
- Cylinder head material: Cast iron
- Valvetrain: OHV 2 valves per cylinder
- Compression ratio: 8.2:1–8.5:1

Combustion
- Fuel system: Carburetor
- Fuel type: Gasoline
- Oil system: Full pressure w/full-flow filter & gerotor oil pump
- Cooling system: Jacketed block, Water pump to radiator

Chronology
- Predecessor: Flathead 218 and 230" I6
- Successor: 239 cu in (3.9 L) V6; 215-245-265 Hemi-6 (Australia only)

Chrysler Slant-Six was the promotional name for an overhead valve inline-6 engine produced by Chrysler Motors between 1959 and 1991, and it remains in use as a popular reference name for the powerplant. Featuring a reverse-flow cylinder head and cylinder bank inclined at a 30-degree angle from vertical, it was introduced in 170 cu in (2.8 L) and 225 cu in (3.7 L) displacements for the 1960 model year. It was a clean-sheet design known within Chrysler as the G-engine, built as a direct replacement for the flathead Chrysler straight six with which the company started business in 1925.

The design proved very successful, being utilized in cars, trucks, boats, and agricultural and industrial applications.

== Naming ==
The Slant Six nomenclature did not emerge as an auto-enthusiasts’ nickname. Though the phrase isn’t seen in 1960- or 1961-model (Plymouth) Valiant brochures, it was used in Chrysler’s own press releases and advertising concurrent with the Valiant’s late-October 1959 introduction and initial production year.

== Design ==
The Chrysler Slant Six engine was a clean-sheet design, led by Willem Weertman, later Chrysler's chief engine designer. Its characteristic 30° inclined cylinder block gave it a lower height, copying the same cant Mercedes-Benz had introduced in 1952 in the Mercedes-Benz M194 engine that powered the Mercedes-Benz W194 300 SL sports car which won Le Mans and the Carrera due to the high straightline speed of it low body. This enabled Chrysler stylists to lower hood lines, and also made room for the water pump to be mounted with a lateral offset, significantly shortening the engine's overall length. The slanted cylinder block also provides space in the vehicle's engine bay for intake and exhaust manifolds with runners of longer and more nearly equal length compared to the rake- or log-style manifolds typical of other inline engines. The No. 1 and No. 6 intake runners are of approximately equal length, the No. 2 and No. 5 equal but shorter, and the No. 3 and No. 4 equal and shortest. This has the effect of broadening the torque curve for better performance. The Slant Six manifold configuration gives relatively even distribution of fuel mixture to all cylinders, and presents less flow restriction. This, in turn, provides for relatively good airflow through the engine despite the intake and exhaust ports being on the same side of the head rather than in a crossflow arrangement.

It was introduced in two displacements in 1960: The 170 cu in (2.8 L) "LG" (low-G, referring to the relatively short engine block casting and crankshaft stroke) in the compact Valiant, and the 225 cu in (3.7 L) "RG" (raised-G, referring to the relatively tall engine block casting and crankshaft stroke) in full-size Plymouth and Dodge Dart models. In 1960, the engine was called the "30-D Economy Six" engine by Plymouth marketers, referring to the 30° cylinder block angle.

The G-engine was offered in various configurations in the North American market until 1983 in cars, 1987 in trucks, and 1991 for marine, agricultural, and industrial use. The G-engine was used by Chrysler's international operations in locally produced vehicles. It was also purchased by other original equipment manufacturers for installation in commercial vehicles, agricultural and industrial equipment, and boats.

Hear a slant-6 engine
-
A 225 slant Six engine in a 1965 Canadian Valiant starts and runs

The G-engine gained a reputation for reliability and durability. The basic design is rigid and sturdy, in part because the engine was designed to be made of either iron or aluminum. An aluminum block was produced in 1961–1963, but most blocks were made of iron. The block is of a deep-skirt design, with the crankshaft axis well above the oil pan rails for structural rigidity. Although only four main bearings are used, they are of the same dimensions as those in the 2G 5-bearing (1964–1971) Hemi, and fewer mains results in a crankshaft better able to withstand the effects of torque. Efficient cooling and lubrication systems, a favorable ratio of connecting rod length to stroke, and a forged steel crankshaft (on engines made through mid-1976) all contributed to the engine's strength and durability.

The G-engine was designed for utility and economy, and gave better overall performance than its competitors at its 1960 introduction. It generally kept up through the 1960s and early-1970s with its direct competition, though specialty 6-cylinder engines like the Pontiac OHC Six, a brief GM outlier designed for its sporty Firebird pony car, bested the performance of most versions of the Slant-6. After an early factory racing program was discontinued by 1962, the Slant Six did not receive much performance development. Most Slant Sixes were equipped with a single 1-barrel carburetor. Starting in the early 1970s, primitive emission controls adversely affected driveability and power, though a version of the 2-barrel carburetor package first released for marine and export markets in 1967 was offered in North America from 1977 to 1983 under the "Super Six" name. Performance figures were only slightly higher, but driveability was substantially improved.

Other Chrysler engines were released with more advanced combustion chambers, electronic fuel injection, and other modern improvements, but the length of the Slant Six precluded its use in Chrysler's front-wheel-drive cars. A new 3.9 L (238 cu in) V6 engine was created for the 1987 Dodge Dakota compact pickup truck by removing two cylinders from the corporate 318 cu in (5.2 L) LA V8 engine. It replaced the Slant-6 in the rest of the Dodge truck line at the end of the 1987 model year.

== Significant production changes ==
- The combustion chamber shape was slightly modified for 1967 to promote more complete combustion and reduce exhaust emission toxicity.
- All G engines used forged steel crankshafts until the middle of model year 1976, when a less costly cast-iron crankshaft was introduced. The cast crankshaft uses a different block, different main and connecting rod bearings and different connecting rods.
- The counterbore in the rear flange of the crankshaft was 1 1/4 inches (32 mm) diameter until 1967. For 1968, it was enlarged to 1 1/2 inches (38 mm). This difference has implications when swapping engines with automatic transmissions.
- All G-engines used solid valve lifters through the 1980 model year, with the exception of a small production test of hydraulic lifters in the 1978 model year. For model year 1981, all North American G-engines received top-fed hydraulic lifters. Retrofitment in both directions is possible.
- Emission control devices and systems, carburetor make and specification, and engine assembly details changed over the years to comply with market requirements and preferences.
- Electronic ignition, which had been made available on V8 engines late in 1971, was made standard equipment on all engines including the RG in 1973.
- Induction-hardened exhaust valve seats and upgraded exhaust valves were made standard in 1973 to withstand prolonged operation on no-lead fuel.

== Configuration variants ==
=== 170 ===
The 170 engine was offered in model years 1960 through 1969 in North America, and through 1971 for export markets. The first vehicle to offer the 170 slant-6 was the 1960 Valiant. The engine has a bore of 3 2/5 in (86.4 mm) and a stroke of 3 1/8 in (79.4 mm) for an actual displacement of 170.2 cu in (2.8 L). Connecting rod length is 5.707 in (145.0 mm). The "LG" low-deck block was unique to the 170 engine.

=== 198 ===
The 198 was introduced in the North American market for model year 1970 as a more powerful base-model engine than the previous 170 engine. The increased displacement gave improved vehicle performance and lower manufacturing cost, for it was achieved with the tall RG block also used with the 225 engine by installing a crankshaft with 3.64 in (92.5 mm) stroke and connecting rods 7.006 in (178.0 mm) long, for an actual displacement of 198.3 cu in (3.2 L). Manufacturing costs were reduced by eliminating using two different blocks for the two different available sizes of slant-6 engine. The 198 engine was available through the 1974 model year.

=== 225 ===
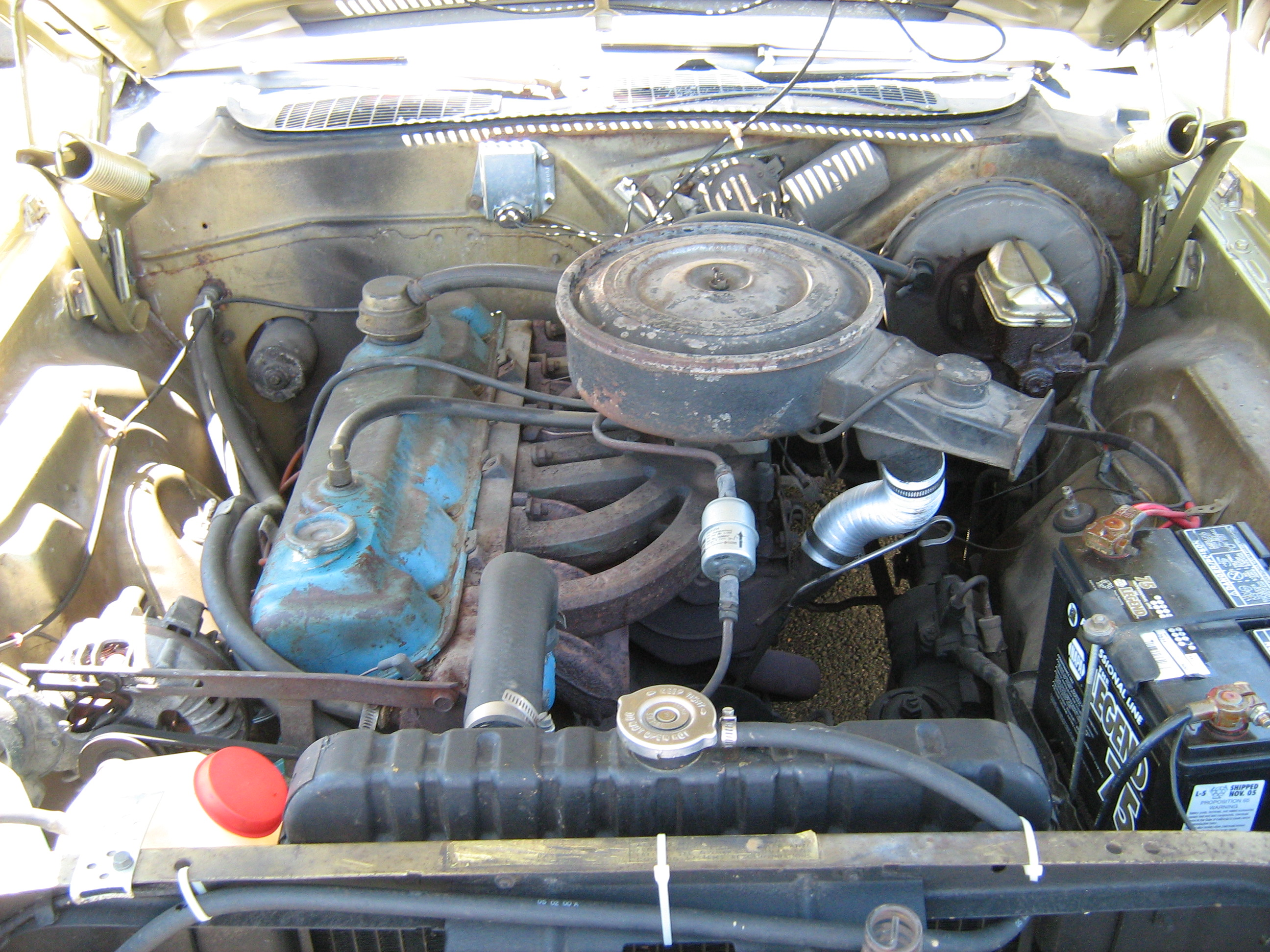
Slant-6 in a first-generation Dodge Challenger

The 225 used the RG (tall) block with a 3 2/5 in (86.4 mm) bore, a 4 1/8 in (104.8 mm) stroke and 6.699 in (170.2 mm) connecting rods, for an actual displacement of 224.7 cu in (3.7 L). This undersquare geometry was a departure from the emerging trend towards oversquare engines. It provided strong low-rpm torque characteristics for automobiles and trucks, as well as other commercial and marine applications. The 225 was originally designed and introduced in 1960 for use in full-size models, and it eventually became the best known of the Slant Six engines. The original Chrysler 225 Slant Six produced around 145 hp (108 kW) at 4,000 rpm and 215 lb⋅ft (292 N⋅m) of torque at 2,800 rpm.

In 1982, Chrysler signed an agreement with Perkins Engines to build a dieselized version of the 3.7, with seven main bearings and turbocharged as well as naturally aspirated (and also of the 2.2-liter inline-four) in Windsor, Ontario. Design work had started in 1975, but with the collapse of the diesel market in North America, these plans were cancelled in 1983.

==== Aluminum block 225 ====
Between late model year 1961 and early model year 1963, approximately 52,000 die-cast aluminum RG blocks were produced and installed in passenger cars. These open-deck blocks used integrally cast high-nickel iron cylinder liners, and bolt-in iron upper and lower main bearing caps. Internal components (crank, rods, pistons, etc.) were the same as used in the iron engine, and an iron cylinder head was used with a special copper-asbestos gasket. The aluminum block weighs about 80 lb (36 kg) less than the iron RG block.

Although serviceable examples can still be found, the aluminum RG tended to undergo delamination between the iron cylinder liner and the surrounding aluminum. Severe corrosion within the block is also commonly found because of the general tendency in the 1960s and 1970s to fill cooling systems in summer with plain water without corrosion inhibitors. Moreover, the open-deck design and primitive head gasket technology are not sufficiently robust to withstand the increased seal demands of increased compression or forced induction.

=== High-performance variants ===
Most G-engines were equipped with small-capacity carburetors (such as the ubiquitous Holley 1920) and exhaust systems adequate for standard passenger car usage at low altitudes, but which tended to hamper maximum available performance at high altitudes, in heavy or race-purpose vehicles and/or where quicker acceleration was desired. To meet the demand for improved responsiveness, modified engine configurations were made available in various markets over the years.

==== Hyper Pak ====
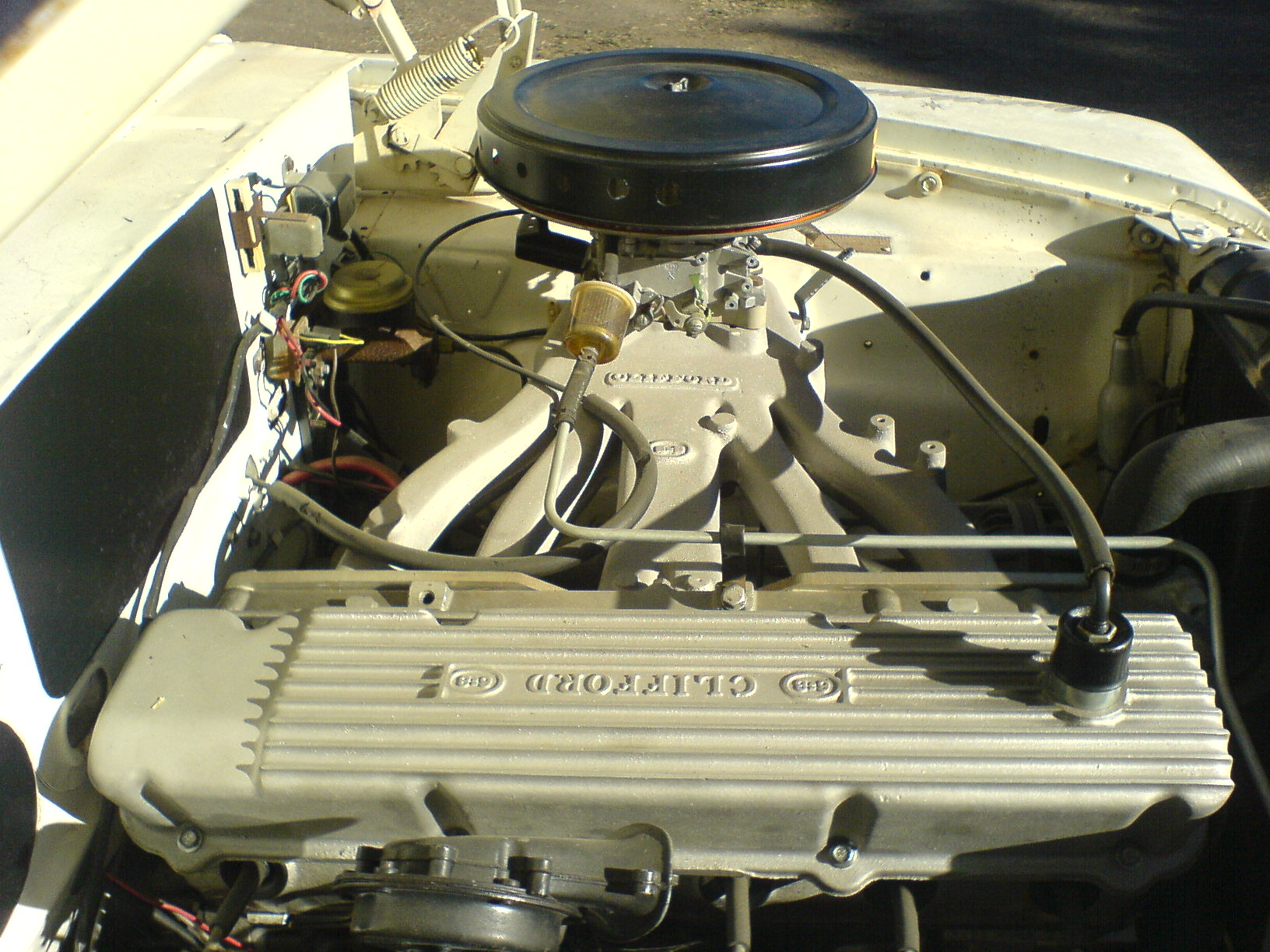
Reproduction Hyper-Pak intake on a Slant-6 engine

The Hyper Pak was a parts package made available from 1960 through 1962 at Chrysler Corporation dealer parts counters. The parts were made available to comply with the regulations of sanctioning bodies for racing events in which Valiants had been entered by factory-backed teams: All parts used had to be "stock" parts, the definition of which meant that they were available through normal factory parts channels. The Hyper Pak consisted of a very-long-ram intake manifold meant to accept an AFB 4-barrel Carter Carburetor, the AFB carburetor itself and an appropriate air cleaner, dual (front-3 and rear-3) cast-iron exhaust headers, a large-diameter exhaust Y-pipe to connect to these dual cast-iron headers, a larger muffler, a 276°-duration camshaft with appropriate valve springs and pushrods, a heavier-duty clutch, a manual choke control, a starter motor modification template and, in the full-race version of the package, high-compression pistons designed to increase the engine's compression ratio to 10.5 from the stock 8.5. The Hyper Pak was recommended for installation only on vehicles equipped with manual transmissions, for the camshaft was of such characteristics that a high idle speed was required to prevent engine stall-out. The Hyper Pak was primarily intended for competition driving, its road manners involving rough idling and poor cold-engine driveability, a high power band and poor fuel economy. In competition events it proved unbeatable. Seven factory-backed Valiants entered the 1960 NASCAR compact car race at Daytona Beach, and humbled the competition. The Valiants came in first through seventh. A high-fidelity reproduction of the Hyper Pak intake manifold was created by Slant-6 builder Doug Dutra in the late 1990s. Subsequently the tooling was sold to a marketer of performance equipment (Clifford Research, 6=8) for inline six-cylinder engines.

==== Multiple carburetors ====
For the 1965–1968 model years, Chrysler Argentina equipped Valiant GT models with a system of dual 1-barrel Holley RX 7000 A carburetors and other engine specification changes. Claimed output was 180 bhp (182 PS; 134 kW), compared to the single-carburetor version of the engine producing 145 bhp (147 PS; 108 kW)

==== 2-barrel carburetion ====
===== Export 2-barrel setup =====
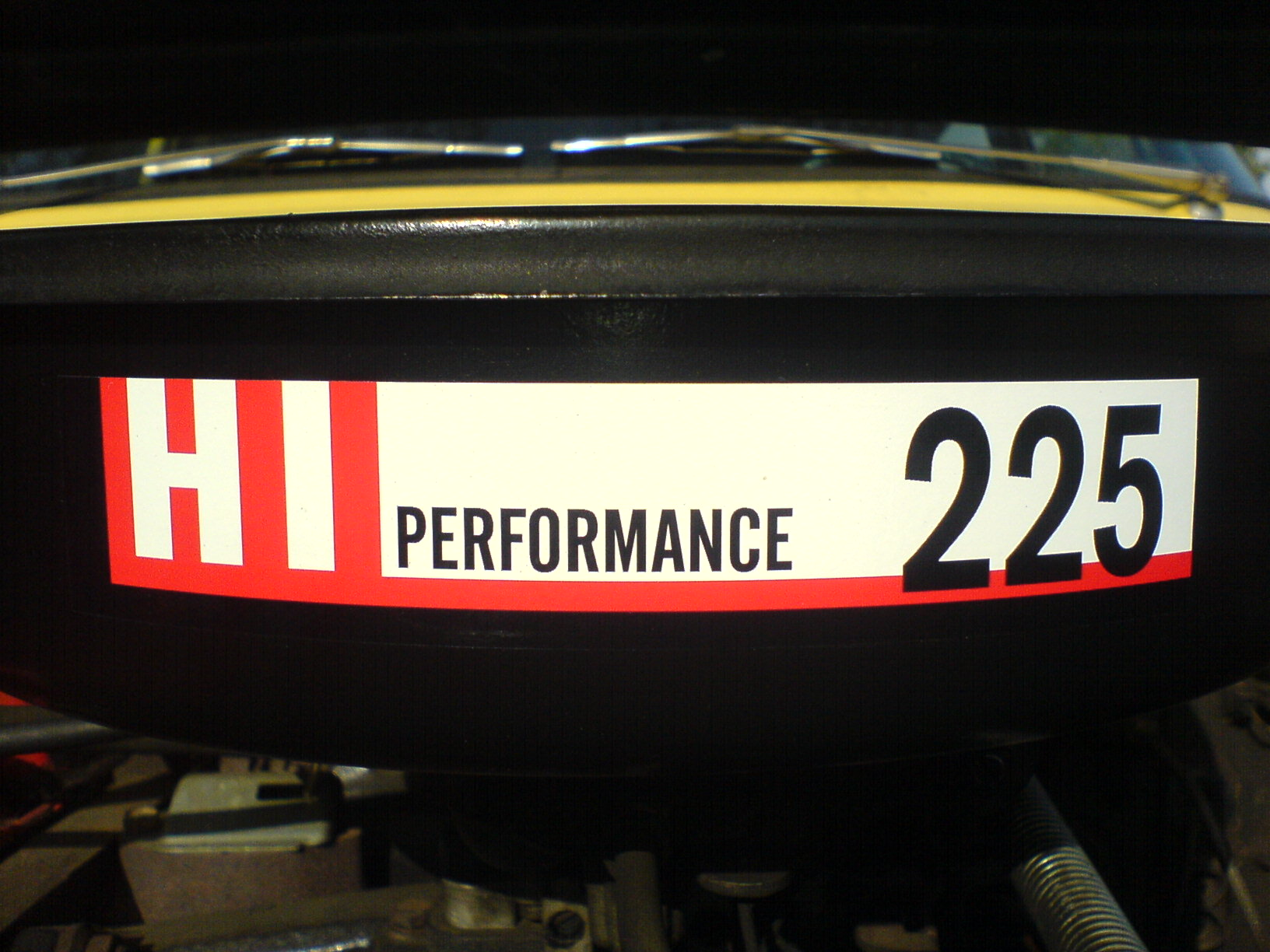
Air cleaner decal from Australian-market 1967–70 2bbl Slant-6 installed on US-market 1976–79 2bbl setup

For the 1967 model year, a 2-barrel carburetor setup was released for export production. This configuration, similar to that found on marine G-engines beginning in 1965, consisted of an iron intake manifold with open-plenum 2-barrel carburetor mounting pad, a Carter BBD carburetor, and associated air cleaner, linkage and plumbing changes. Also installed on these export 2-barrel engines was a slightly hotter camshaft (244° duration rather than 240°), and a distributor with modified advance curves. This engine, rated at 160 bhp (162 PS; 119 kW), was popular in Central and South America, South Africa, Australia and New Zealand. Driveability characteristics were generally superior to those of the 1-barrel engine, but to avoid cutting into sales of the more expensive V8 engine, this 2-barrel setup was not offered in the North American market. Of particular note is the automatic choke design found in this export 2-barrel setup. Most Chrysler products used remote automatic chokes, with a bimetal coil spring mounted on the exhaust manifold, exposed to exhaust heat and operating a pushrod which rotated the choke lever on the carburetor. The export 2-barrel setup used an integral heat-tube style automatic choke: Air heated by the exhaust manifold was routed to a round bakelite housing on the carburetor air horn, which contained a bimetal spring acting directly on the choke lever.

===== Slant Six 225 high performance =====
At the end of 1973 Chrysler Argentina returned to the fight for the high performance 6 cylinders. Since 1972 Chrysler had not offered a 6 cylinder with sports aspiration but that would change with the release of the Dodge Polara RT, it was a hard top coupe equipped with the new high-performance Slant Six RG 225 or commonly known as Slant Six RT, thanks to the addition of a new Holley 2300 two-barrel carburetor, "3a1" exhaust manifolds, a more violent camshaft with 273° duration; and a compression ratio of 8.5:1 this version produced 174 bhp (176 PS; 130 kW) and torque of 245.6 lb⋅ft (333 N⋅m), this engine coupled to a 4-speed gearbox and a differential with a ratio of 3.07 to 1 launched the Dodge Polara RT to a maximum speed of 181 km/h or 113 mph and an acceleration of 0 to 63 mph in 11 seconds.

===== Super Six =====
By the mid-1970s in the North American market, emission control regulations were reducing engine performance at the same time as safety regulations were making cars heavier. An increase in performance was required for the G-engine, so a 2-barrel setup was released for the 1976 model year. This was not the same as the export 2-barrel package; the intake manifold used a throttle-bored plenum rather than an open one, and had provisions for an EGR valve. The carburetor, a Carter BBD similar but not identical to the one used on Chrysler's 318 cu in (5.2 L) V8 engine, used a standard Chrysler-style remote automatic choke. A 2 1/4 inches (57 mm) exhaust head pipe was also provided, as well as 2-barrel-specific advance curves in the ignition distributor. This package, called "Super Six" by the marketing division, brought rated horsepower from 100 to 110 hp (101 to 112 PS; 75 to 82 kW) and torque from 170 to 180 lb⋅ft (230 to 244 N⋅m), while improving throttle response and driveability while maintaining compliance with emission laws.

== Applications ==
=== Passenger cars, trucks, vans ===
Cars, trucks and vans using G- and RG-engines
- 1980-1983 Chrysler Cordoba
- 1982-1984 Chrysler Fifth Avenue
- 1977-1981 Chrysler LeBaron
- 1962-1970 Chrysler Valiant
- 1975-1980 Dodge Aspen
- 1970-1971 Dodge Challenger
- 1969-1974 Dodge Charger
- 1965-1976 Dodge Coronet
- 1960-1976 Dodge Dart
- 1971-1972 Dodge Demon
- 1971-1988 Dodge Ram Van
- 1977-1983 Dodge Diplomat
- 1960-1962 Dodge Lancer
- 1980-1983 Dodge Mirada
- 1965-1967 Dodge Monaco (Canada)
- 1977-1978 Dodge Monaco
- 1969-1973 Dodge Polara
- 1981-1987 Dodge Ram
- 1978-1981 Dodge St. Regis
- 1964-1970 A-series truck and van
- 1960-1987 D-series truck and van
- 1961-1987 W-series 4WD truck
- 1964-1971 Plymouth Barracuda
- 1962-1967 Plymouth Belvedere
- 1969-1976 Plymouth Duster
- 1960-1973;1975-1978 Plymouth Fury
- 1980-1984 Plymouth Gran Fury
- 1971-1974 Plymouth Satellite
- 1955-1956;1962-1964 Plymouth Savoy
- 1960 Valiant
- 1961-1976 Plymouth Valiant
- 1975-1980 Plymouth Volaré
