= Plymouth Duster =

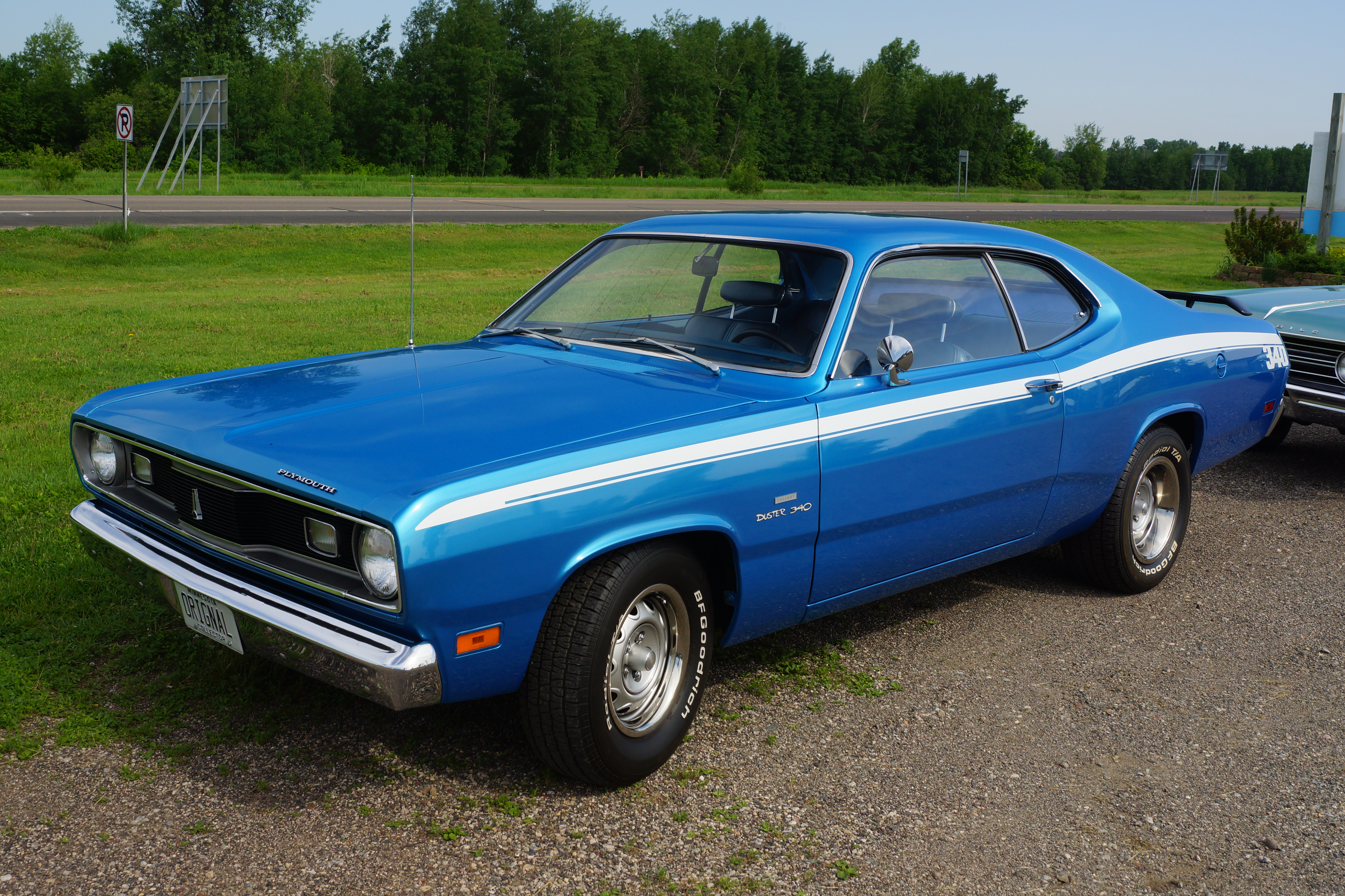
- 1970 Plymouth Duster 340

Overview
- Manufacturer: Plymouth (Chrysler)
- Production: 1969–1976
- Model years: 1969–1976
- Assembly: United States: Hamtramck, Michigan (Dodge Main Plant); United States: Commerce, California (Los Angeles Plant); United States: Fenton, Missouri (Saint Louis Assembly); Canada: Windsor, Ontario (Windsor Assembly
- Designer: Milt Antonick and Neil Walling

Body and chassis
- Class: Compact car
- Body style: 2-door coupe
- Layout: Front-engine, rear-wheel-drive
- Platform: A-body
- Related: Plymouth Valiant; Dodge Dart

Powertrain
- Engine: 198 cu in (3.2 L) Slant 6 I6; 225 cu in (3.7 L) Slant 6 I6; 318 cu in (5.2 L) LA V8; 340 cu in (5.6 L) LA V8; 360 cu in (5.9 L) LA V8
- Transmission: 3-speed manual; 4-speed manual; 3-speed TorqueFlite automatic

Dimensions
- Wheelbase: 108.0 in (2,743 mm)

Chronology
- Predecessor: Plymouth Valiant Barracuda
- Successor: Plymouth Volare (United States); Plymouth Caravelle coupe (Canada)

The original Plymouth Duster is a semi-fastback two-door coupe version of the compact-sized Plymouth Valiant automobile that was marketed by Plymouth in the U.S. from 1969 until 1976 model years.

== History ==
The Duster coupe provided the compact-sized Plymouth Valiant with a sporty body style to attract customers. The car was a $15 million effort to update the Valiant for the 1969 model year. The Valiant badge appeared only on the first model year Dusters, and continued to be used on all the companion four-door sedan and two-door Valiant Scamp hardtop models. The Duster was built on the Valiant platform and shared the same front-end sheet metal, but featured a different design from the cowl back.

The Duster was also positioned to compete with Ford's slightly smaller semi-fastback Maverick compact car and the AMC Hornet, which were both introduced in 1969. It also competed with the somewhat larger semi-fastback Chevrolet Nova, whose design was introduced in 1968. While the Maverick, Hornet, and Nova were offered in a four-door sedan body style, the Duster nameplate was used only for the two-door coupe. The Duster was also marketed as an alternative to the original Volkswagen Beetle, as well as the new class of domestic subcompact cars such as the Chevrolet Vega.

Numerous trim and option package variants of the Duster were offered with names that included Feather Duster, Gold Duster, Silver Duster, Space Duster, Duster Twister, Duster 340, and Duster 360. These Duster design marketing variations targeted customers seeking economy, cargo capacity, and/or performance.

After failed negotiations with Warner Brothers to use the Tasmanian Devil cartoon, Thomas R. Bertsch created the Duster's "twister" logo and font. Bertsch (1952–1987) was the manager of the Interior Body Development Studio at Chrysler for much of his career. Many corresponding graphics were used for different trim packages over the years.

Engines

Engine	Power SAE gross	Power SAE net	Years
198 Inline 6		95 hp (71 kW)	1973 - 1974
198 Inline 6		100 hp (75 kW)	1972
198 Inline 6	125 hp (93 kW)	105 hp (78 kW)	1969 - 1971
225 Inline 6		90 hp (67 kW)	1975 - 1976
225 Inline 6		95 hp (71 kW)	1975
225 Inline 6		98 hp (73 kW)	1973
225 Inline 6		100 hp (75 kW)	1976
225 Inline 6		105 hp (78 kW)	1973 - 1974
225 Inline 6	145 hp (108 kW)	110 hp (82 kW)	1970 - 1972
318 V8		140 hp (100 kW)	1975 - 1976
318 V8		145 hp (108 kW)	1975
318 V8		150 hp (110 kW)	1972 - 1974, 1976
318 V8	230 hp (170 kW)	155 hp (116 kW)	1970 - 1971
340 V8	275 hp (205 kW)	235 hp (175 kW)	1970 - 1971
340 V8		240 hp (180 kW)	1972 - 1973
360 V8		190 hp (140 kW)	1975
360 V8		220 hp (160 kW)	1976
360 V8		230 hp (170 kW)	1975
360 V8		245 hp (183 kW)	1974

== Model years ==
=== 1969 ===
The Plymouth Duster introduced in late-1969 for the 1970 model year was a Valiant from the cowl forward, but the rest of the car's sheet metal, save door skins, was completely different. The design incorporated a semi-fastback roof and a special rear valance having no bezels. The door glass was operated by a new regulator mechanism, required to fit the much more radical tumblehome (reduced side glass radius), and the windshield was more steeply raked. For 1970 only, a small Valiant badge went on the front fenders just above the Duster badge.

The 1970 Duster was available in two models – the standard Duster and a performance-oriented Duster 340. Engine options were 198 cu in (3.2 L) and 225 cu in (3.7 L) versions of Chrysler's Slant Six, as well as the 318 cu in (5.2 L) and 340 cu in (5.6 L) LA-series V8s.

At midyear, a Gold Duster trim package was added. The Gold Duster package came with gold badging, gold stripes on the sides and rear, wall-to-wall carpeting, pleated, all-vinyl seats, whitewalls, wheel covers, a deluxe insulation package, and a canopy vinyl roof. The Gold Duster was offered through 1975 of which 24,817 were equipped with the 318 engine.

=== 1971 ===
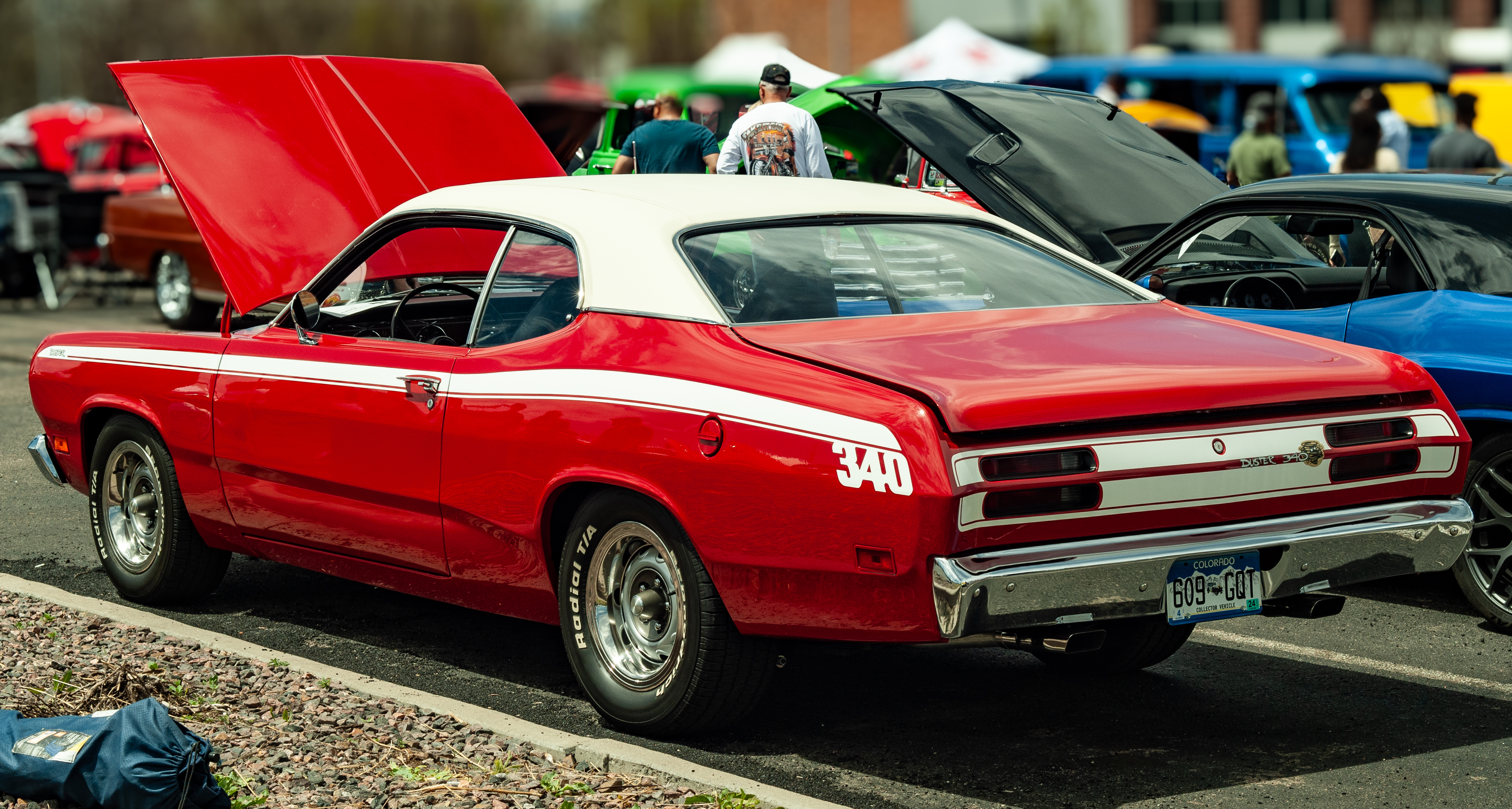
1971 Plymouth Duster 340

The Duster was a success for Plymouth, so much so that in 1971 Dodge requested and received their own version, the Demon. In response, Plymouth was given a version of the Dodge Dart Swinger 2-door hardtop named the Plymouth Valiant Scamp.

For 1971, only small changes were made to the Duster. The "Valiant" fender badges and "Plymouth" grille logotype were deleted. A new trim package was released, called the Duster Twister. The Twister package presented the appearance of the Duster 340, but came only with the base I6 or 318 V8. The Twister's appearance package included special side stripes that mimicked the Duster 340 Wedge stripes, a matte-black hood, and the 340's special shark-tooth grille. A nonfunctional dual hood scoop and rear spoiler appearance package were available, as were high-back bucket seats and dual exhaust.

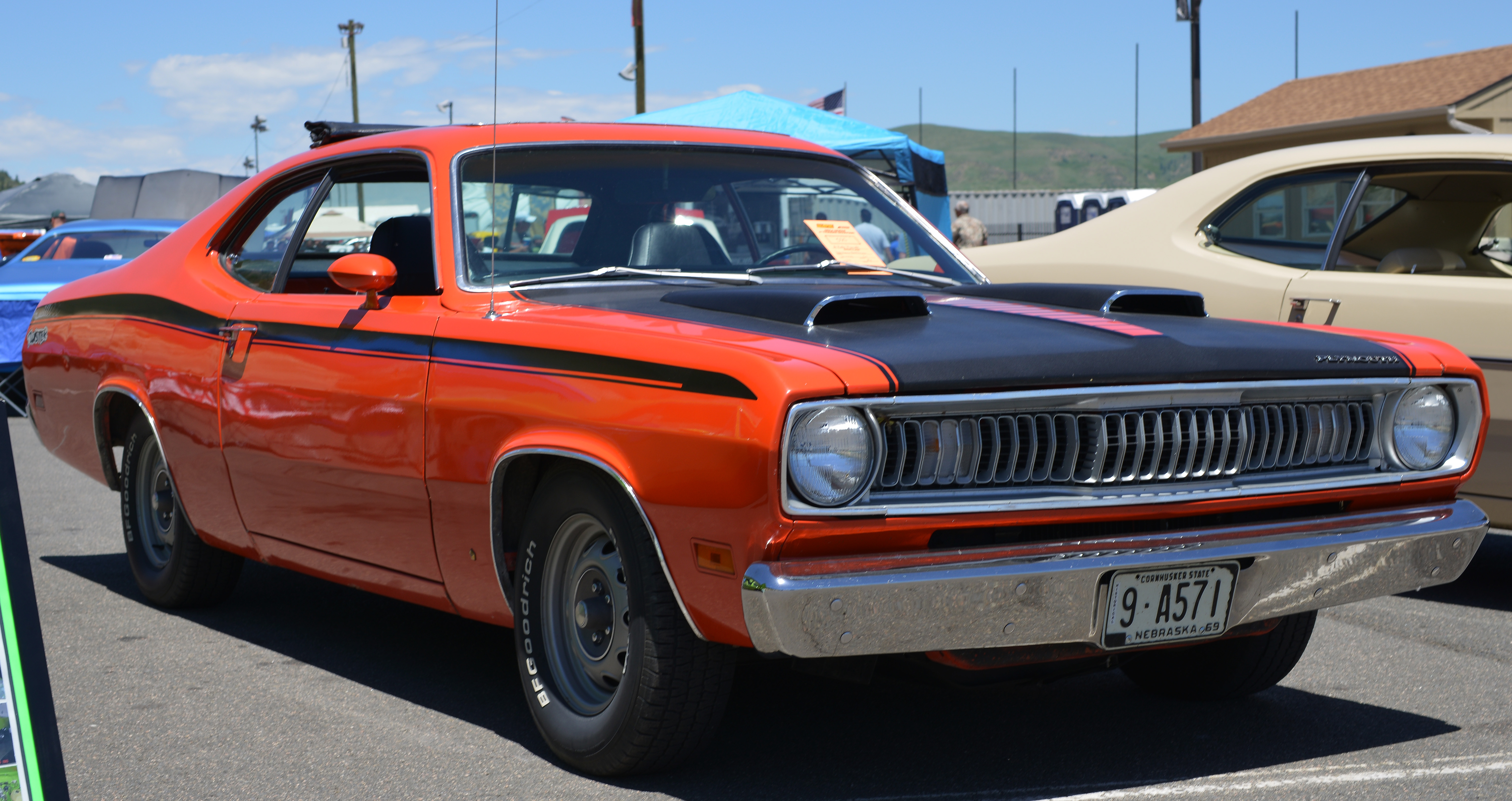
1971 Plymouth Duster Twister in Tor-Red EV2 Orange. Picture displays sharktooth grille, Twister hoodscoops and hood strobe stripe.

A new electronic "breakerless" ignition became optional on the 340 V8 late in the 1971 model year. In 1971, 186,478 Plymouth Dusters were built, with 12,886 equipped with the higher horsepower 340 cubic inch engines.

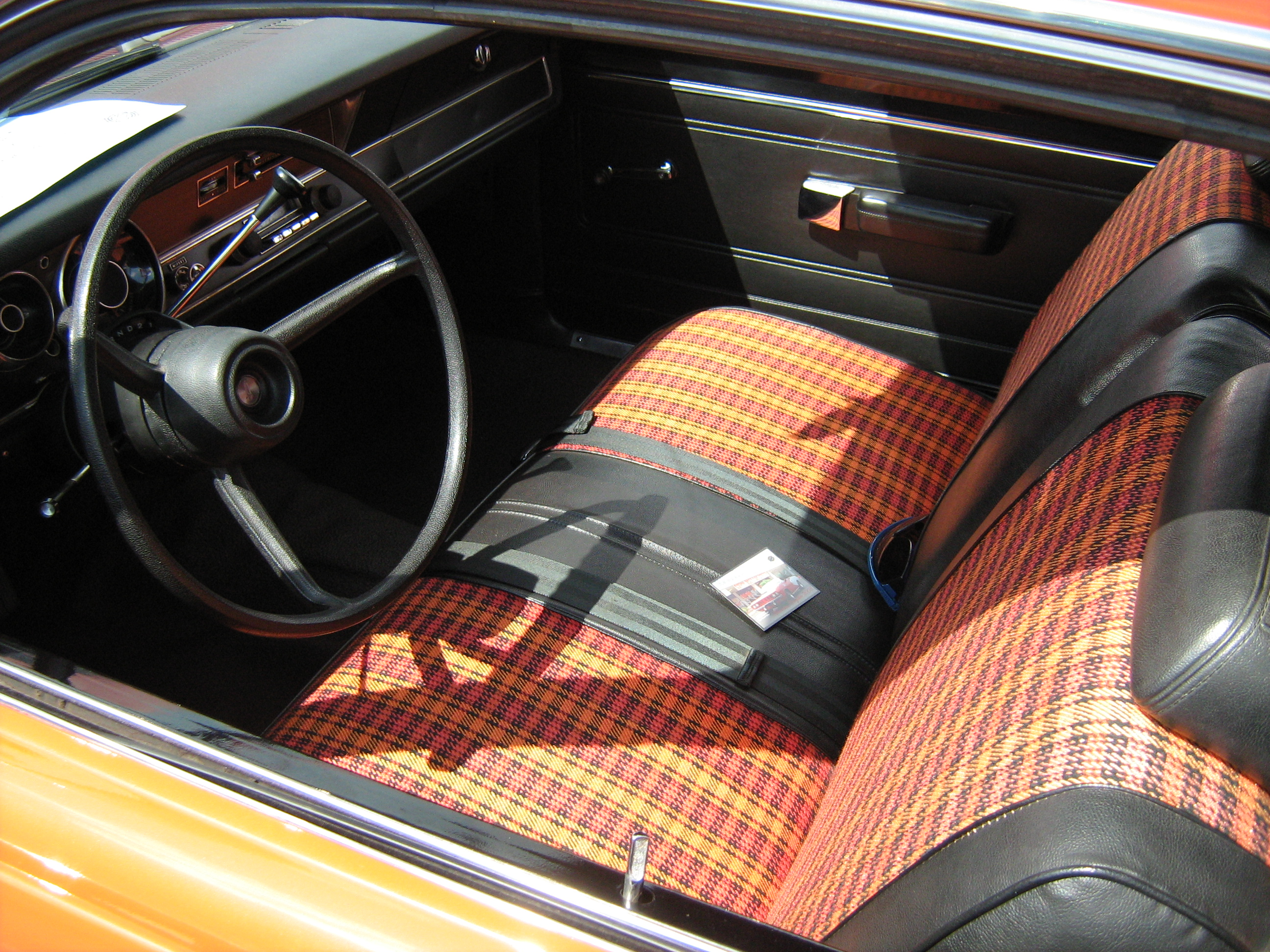
1971 Plymouth Duster interior

=== 1972 ===
The Duster was not changed significantly for 1972. New surface-mount sidemarker lights replaced the previous flush-mount items, the taillamps became larger, one-piece units. The power rating of the 340 V8 was reduced from 275 bhp (205 kW) to 245 bhp (183 kW) due in part to a reduction in compression ratio from 10.2:1 to 8.5:1, as well as changing the intake valves from 2.02 in (51 mm) to 1.88 in (48 mm). All horsepower rating numbers, even on unchanged engines, decreased for 1972 due to a new rating protocol. Chrysler's electronic ignition became standard on the 340 models in 1972. Also, there was a 1-year only air cleaner that had a vacuum-operated door at the bottom to allow for additional airflow when the throttle is depressed.

=== 1973 ===
Following the design changes on the Valiant models, the Duster also received a new hood, grille, front fenders, bumpers, and taillights for 1973. The taillights in previous years mounted from the inside and had a flush appearance. Starting in 1973, the taillights were mounted from the outside and were trimmed in chrome. These remained unchanged through 1976. The Dodge version, the Demon, was rebranded "Dart Sport" in response to religious groups' opposition to the word, "Demon."

Other changes were in store for the Plymouth Duster. Simpler single-piston slider-type disc brake calipers were introduced for the 1973 model year (standard on 318-powered cars and with power-assist on 340 models), replacing the Kelsey Hayes four-piston calipers. Disc brake-equipped Dusters now had the more-common 5-lugs on a 4.5-inch wheel bolt pattern. All 340 and some 318 engine-equipped cars received the simplified 8.25-inch rear axle assembly (with wheel bearings riding directly on the axle shaft and endplay being taken by C-clips); these axles also featured the 5 on a 4.5-inch wheel bolt pattern. (This axle assembly replaced the 8.75-inch "drop-out" arrangement seen on some 1966-1972 A-bodies). The 225-powered cars retained the 5-lugs on a 4-inch pattern on vehicles with the standard drum brakes. A three-speed Torque Flight automatic along with a manual transmission was offered with the 225 slant six. All models received larger front wheel bearings and increased spindle diameter. Electronic ignition became standard across the board.

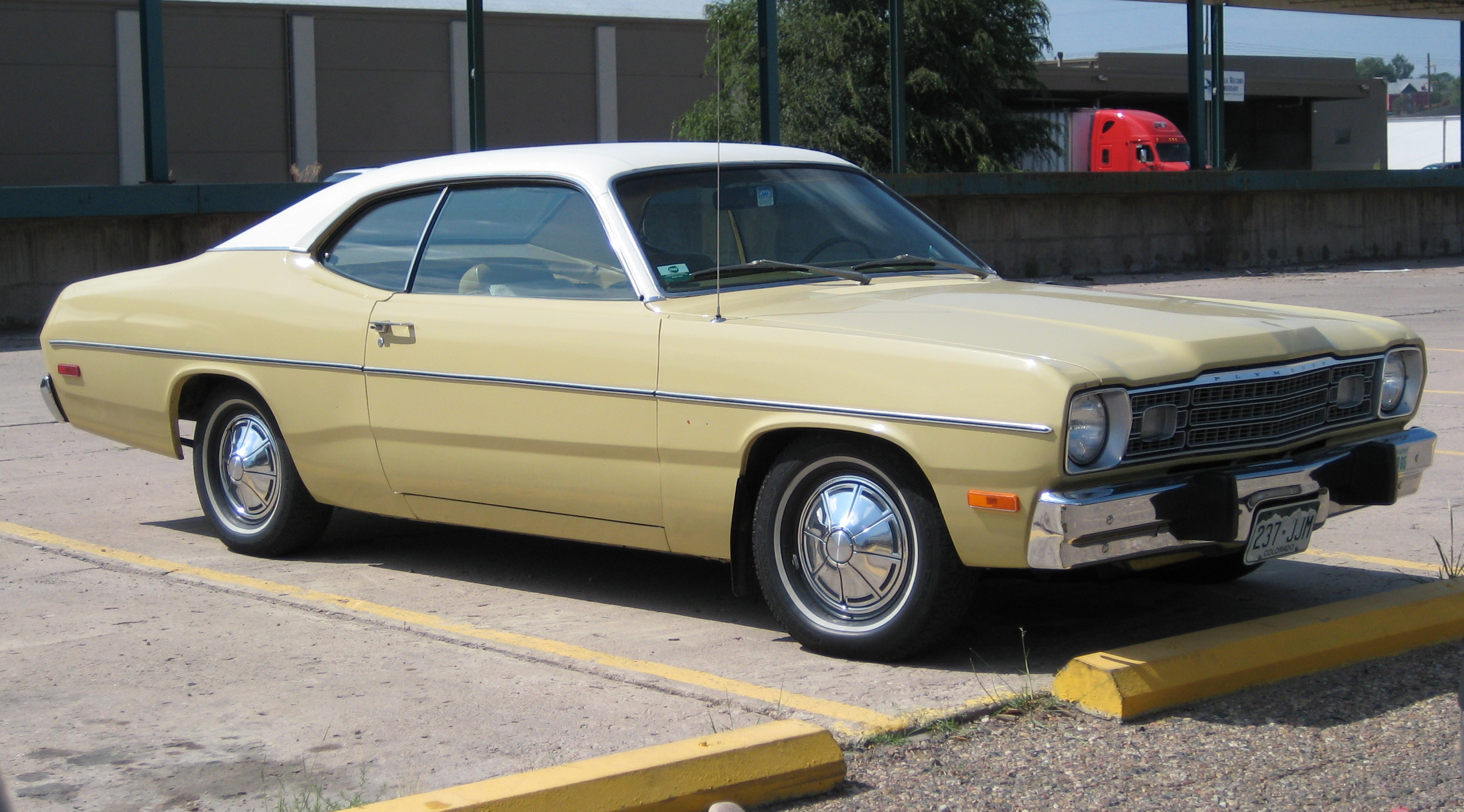
1973 Plymouth Duster

Also, a Space Duster package was offered. This allowed the back bench seat to be folded down, allowing more space to carry cargo. There is also a security flap to hide cargo from outside view.

A new, metal sunroof was optional for 1973. The rear window defroster/defogger was upgraded to an electric-grid style for 1973, which replaced the previous recessed package shelf air blower.

=== 1974 ===
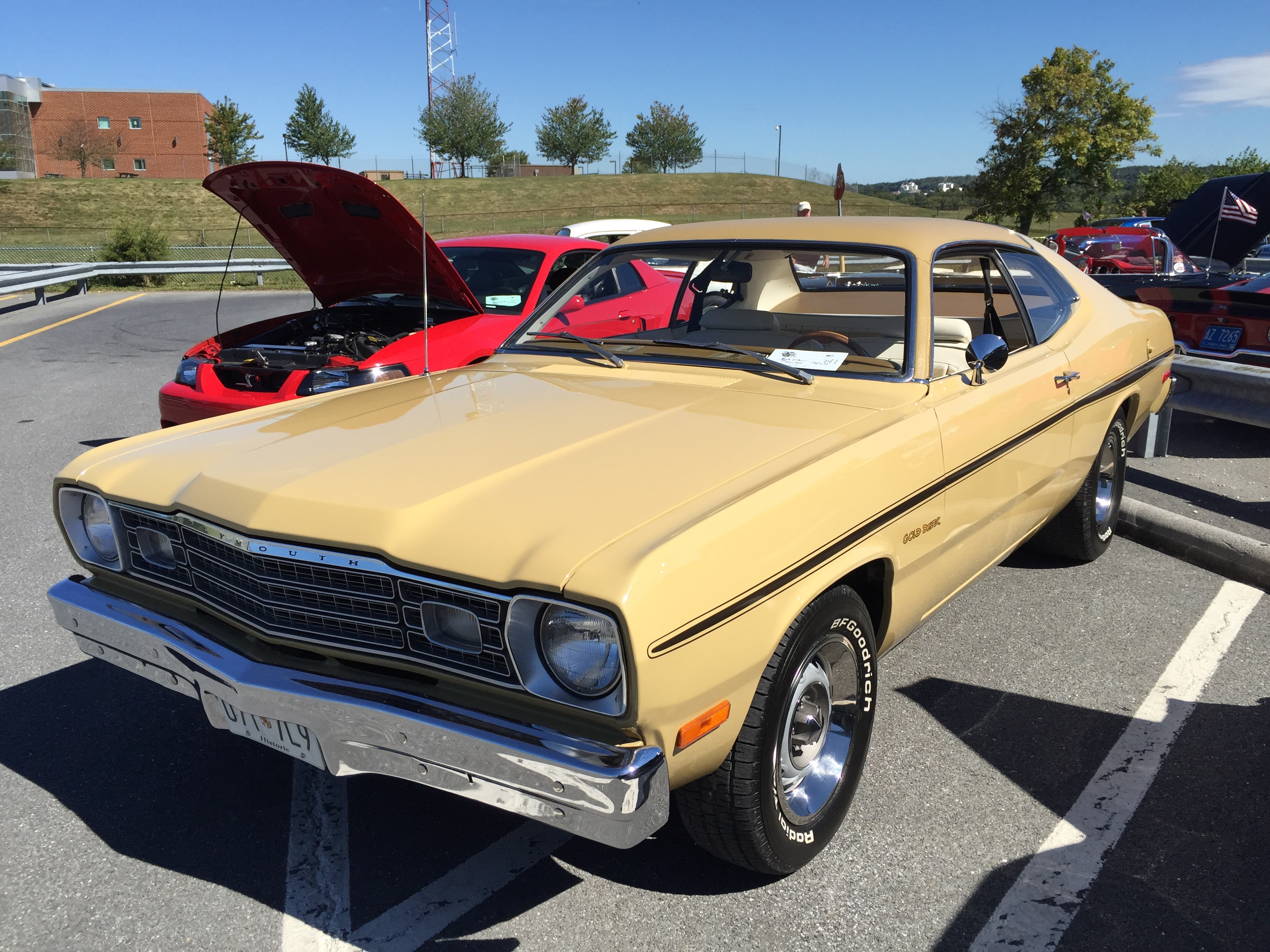
1974 Plymouth Gold Duster

For 1974, Plymouth replaced the 340 with a 360 cu in (5.9 L) version of the corporate LA-series V8, de-tuned to meet new emissions regulations. The new for 1974 "E58" 360 engine produced 245 bhp (183 kW) by utilizing the camshaft, heads, intake manifold, carburetor, and dual-exhaust set up from the past 340 engine. New retractable front seat belts were added. In the midst of the first oil crisis, 1974 would be the Duster's best sales year, with a total of 281,378 Duster-bodied cars produced, the majority of which being the six-cylinder and 318 V8 models. In 1974 there was a separate model called the Duster 360. Standard equipment included the 360 engine, dual exhaust, power disc brakes, full side tape stripe, rear tape stripe, heavier suspension, shocks, added sway bar, and 8 1/4" rear end. Plymouth built 3,969 of these models and most came with automatic transmissions. Duster 360 options included Goodyear raised white letter tires on rally wheels. Air conditioning, a fold-back sunroof, and a flip-down rear seat were also available.

=== 1975 ===
The 1975 models were mostly unchanged from the previous two years, with some exceptions: a new grille with a return of the Plymouth 3-pointed-'spear' affixed to the grille's center; catalytic converters were added to 225 Slant Six and 318 V8 models (the 360 was not equipped with a converter and its power was now 235 bhp (175 kW), due to the addition of a secondary air injection system, commonly referred to as a "smog pump". Fewer than 2000 of the 1975 model Dusters left the factory equipped with the 360 engine.

=== 1976 ===
The grille-mounted park and turn signal lenses were amber; prior years had colorless lenses with amber bulbs. The interior rearview mirror was mounted directly to the windshield rather than to the previous double-pivot roof bracket, and the parking brake was now foot- rather than hand-operated. Disc brakes became standard equipment on cars built after 1 January 1976.

Several special models were offered:

- The Feather Duster featured lightweight aluminum parts including the intake manifold, bumper brackets, hood and trunk bracing, and manual transmission housing, for a weight savings of about 187 lb (84.8 kg)—5% lighter than a standard Duster similarly equipped. It came with a 225 Slant Six with its distributor and single-barrel carburetor calibrated for greater economy, a low-restriction exhaust system, an extra-high rear axle ratio, and was offered with either the Torqueflite 3-speed automatic or A833 overdrive 4-speed manual transmission. It was the most fuel-efficient car in its size class, achieving up to 36 mpg on the highway and 24 in the city with the manual transmission option (along with Dodge's version, the Dart Lite).
- The Space Duster had a fold-down rear seat and security panel and combined with the luggage compartment, offered over 50 cu ft (1.4 m^{3}) of cargo space. (This feature was actually introduced, optionally, in 1973).
- The Silver Duster had special stripes and a cloth Boca Raton style interior.

The Duster 360 option was deleted as a separate model as the engine became an option on any trim level Duster, and about 1,300 cars were equipped with it. The 1976 360-powered Duster (and Dart Sport 360) was still without a catalytic converter, and while its power was down to 225 bhp (168 kW), the car could still manage 0–60 mph in 7.9 seconds when equipped with the 3.21 rear axle gearing.

== Replacement ==
In mid-1976 the Dodge Aspen and Plymouth Volare twins replaced the Dodge Dart and Plymouth Valiant/Duster, which were still based on bodies originally sold in 1967. The fastback coupes featured a solid B-pillar with fixed rear glass. These new models were introduced to compete with the more upscale Ford Granada and Mercury Monarch.

== Advertising ==
From 1974 to 1975, actress Judy Strangis was a TV pitchwoman for the Plymouth Duster in the role of "Mean Mary Jean," wearing a football jersey and short denim hot-pants. Strangis also promoted Plymouth's Volare and Road Runner models and appeared at Chrysler-Plymouth promotions and auto shows.
