= F platform =

F platform may refer to:

- Chrysler F platform
- General Motors F platform
