= Plymouth Gran Fury =

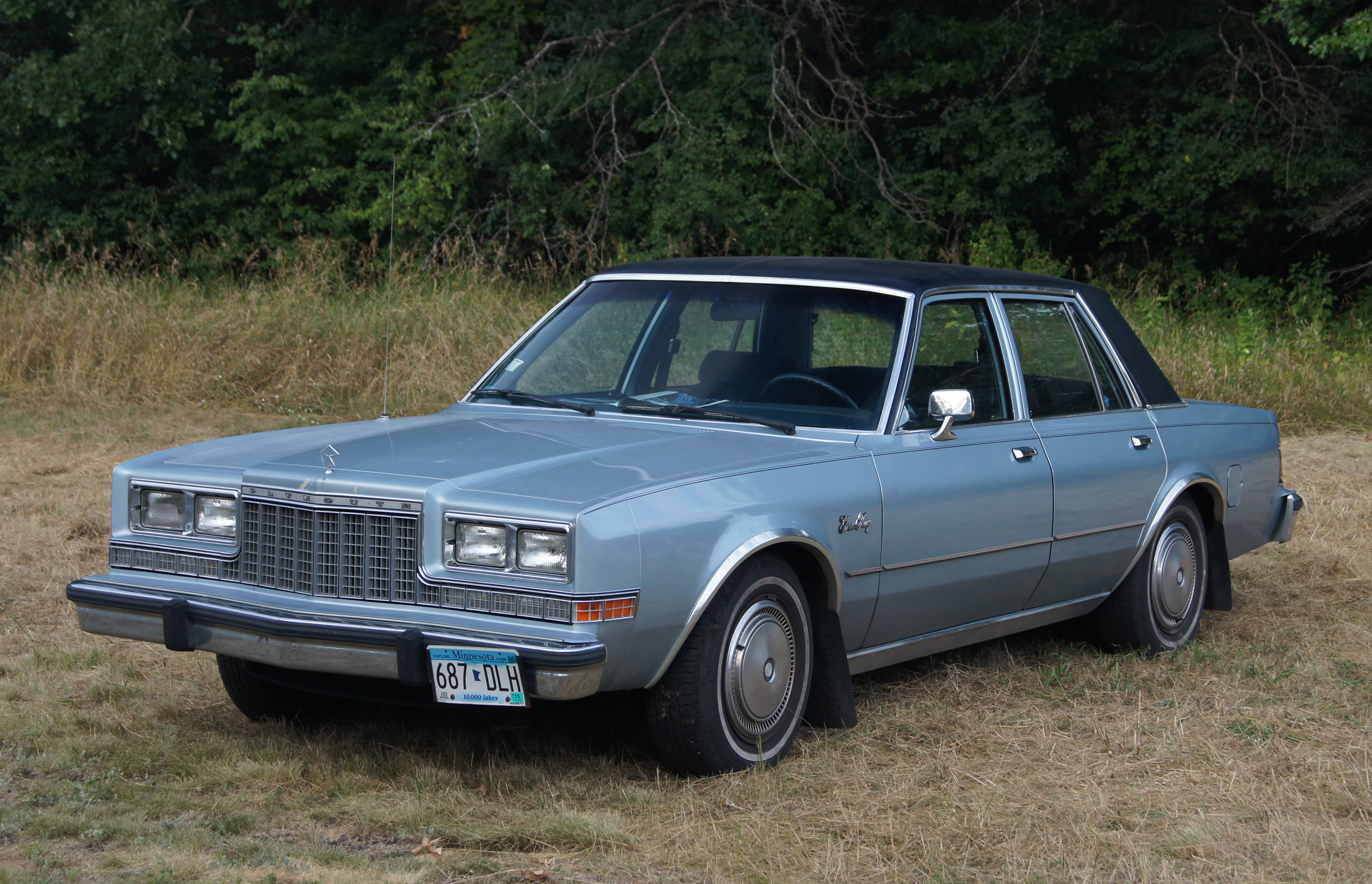
- 1986 Plymouth Gran Fury Salon (M-body)

Overview
- Manufacturer: Plymouth (Chrysler)
- Production: 1974–1977 (C-body); 1979–1981 (R-body); 1981–December 1988 (M-body)
- Model years: 1975–1977 (C-body); 1980–1981 (R-body); 1982–1989 (M-body)
- Assembly: Canada: Windsor, Ontario (Windsor Assembly); United States: Detroit, Michigan (Lynch Road Assembly: 1979–1981); United States: St. Louis, Missouri (Saint Louis Assembly); United States: Kenosha, Wisconsin (Kenosha Assembly: 1987–1988)

Body and chassis
- Layout: Front-engine, rear-wheel-drive

Chronology
- Predecessor: Plymouth Fury (for 1974)
- Successor: Dodge Monaco (fifth generation)

The Plymouth Gran Fury is a full-sized automobile that was manufactured by Plymouth from 1975 to 1989 model years. The nameplate would be used on successive downsizings, first in 1980, and again in 1982, through what would originally have been intermediate and compact classes in the early 1970s, all with conventional rear-wheel drive layouts. By the time Chrysler ended M-body production in December 1988 (1989 model year), they were Chrysler's last remaining rear-wheel drive cars, with a V8 and carburetor, a configuration used since the mid-1950s. Plymouth did not have another rear-wheel drive car until the 1997 Prowler roadster.

Before 1975, the top line models in Plymouth's Fury series were known as the "Fury Gran Coupe" and "Fury Gran Sedan". The Fury Gran Coupe model was introduced in 1970 as a highly trimmed pillared coupe. It moved to the two-door hardtop body for 1971, when a "Fury Gran Coupe" hardtop sedan was also available, renamed "Fury Gran Sedan" for 1972. The Gran Coupe and Gran Sedan models continued in 1973.

== 1975–1977 ==
First generation
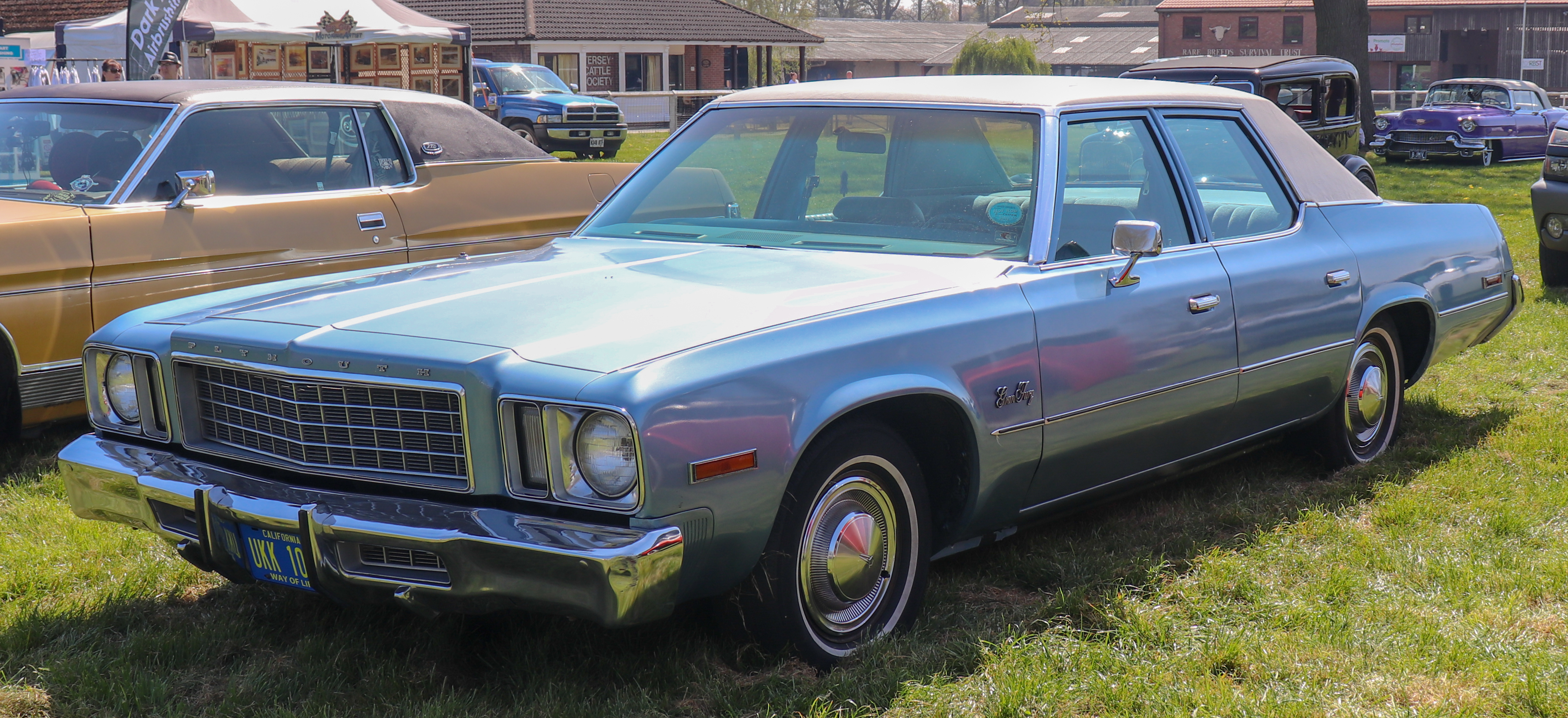
- Full-size C-body 1977 Plymouth Gran Fury 4-door Sedan

Overview
- Production: 1974–1977
- Model years: 1975–1977

Body and chassis
- Class: Full-size
- Body style: 4-door wagon (1975–1977); 4-door sedan (1975–1977); 4-door hardtop (1975 only); 2-door hardtop (1975–1977); 2-door coupe (1975–1977)
- Platform: C-body
- Related: Chrysler Town & Country; Chrysler New Yorker; Chrysler Newport; Dodge Monaco; Plymouth Fury

Powertrain
- Engine: 360 cu in (5.9 L) LA V8; 400 cu in (6.6 L) B V8; 440 cu in (7.2 L) RB V8
- Transmission: 3-speed A727 automatic

Dimensions
- Wheelbase: 121.5 in (3,086 mm) (coupe & sedan); 124 in (3,150 mm) (wagon)
- Length: 219.9 in (5,585 mm)
- Width: 79.9 in (2,029 mm)

Chronology
- Predecessor: Full-size C-body Plymouth Fury (for 1974)

In 1975, the mid-size B-body Plymouth Satellite was restyled and renamed Plymouth Fury. As a result, the previous full-sized C-body Fury became known as the Gran Fury. Because the C-body Fury had been redesigned for 1974, the 1975 Gran Fury received few changes besides its new name. Top-of-the-line Gran Fury Brougham models were treated to a new grille and new single-unit headlight design; all Gran Furys would receive this for 1976.

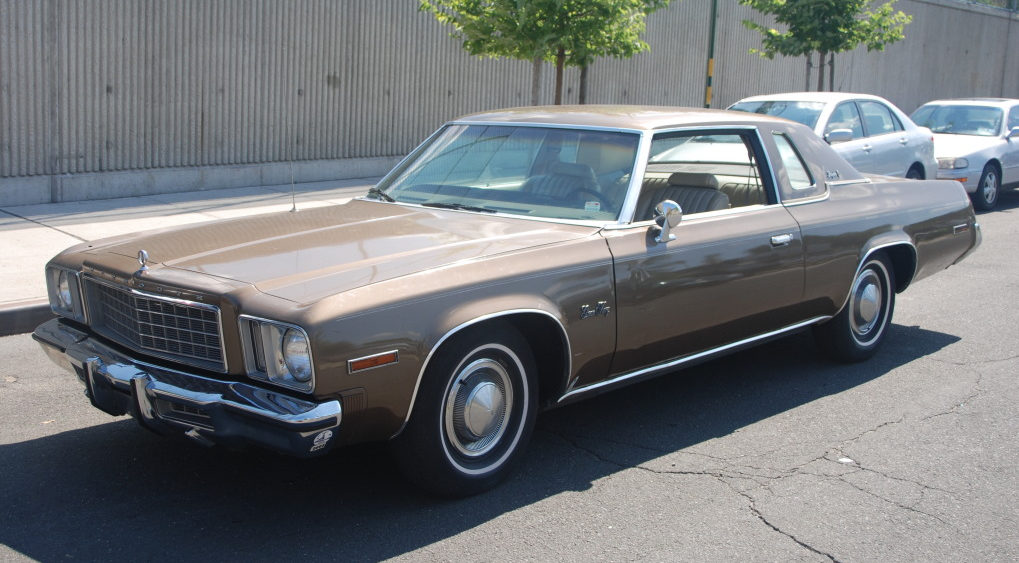
1975 Gran Fury Brougham 2-door coupe

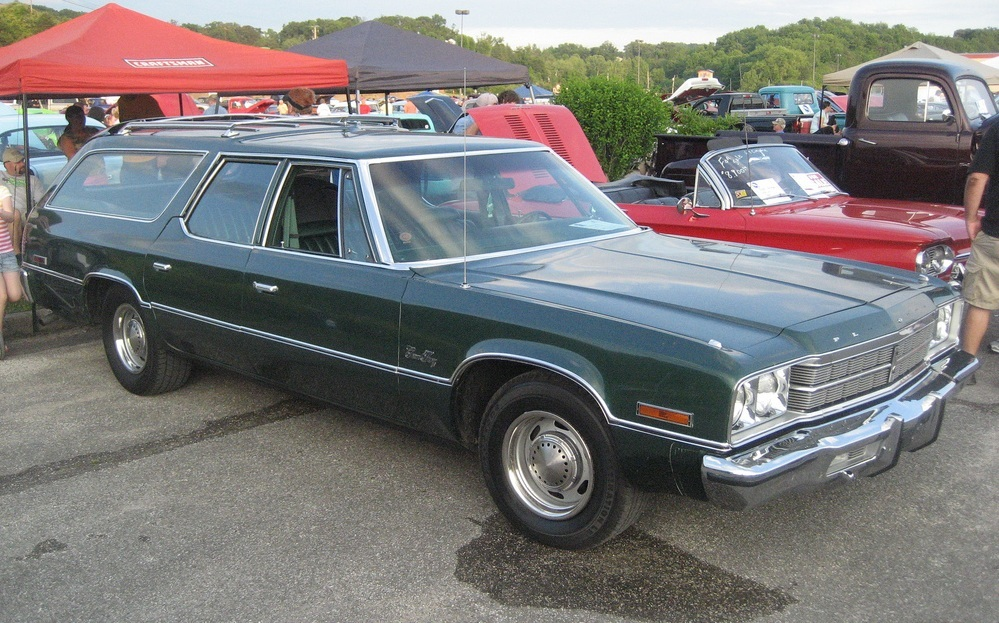
1975 Gran Fury Custom Suburban station wagon

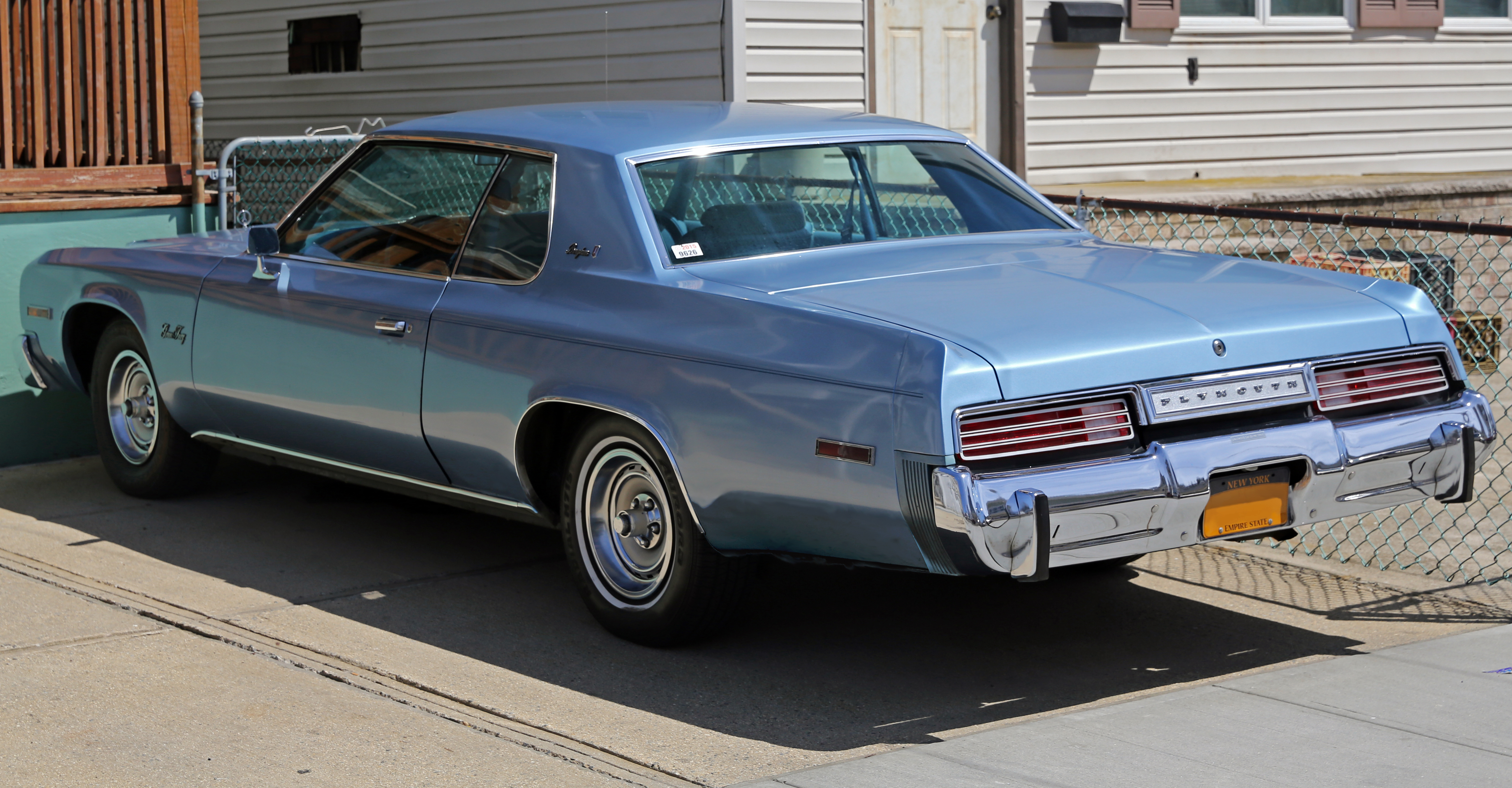
1977 Gran Fury Brougham 2-door hardtop

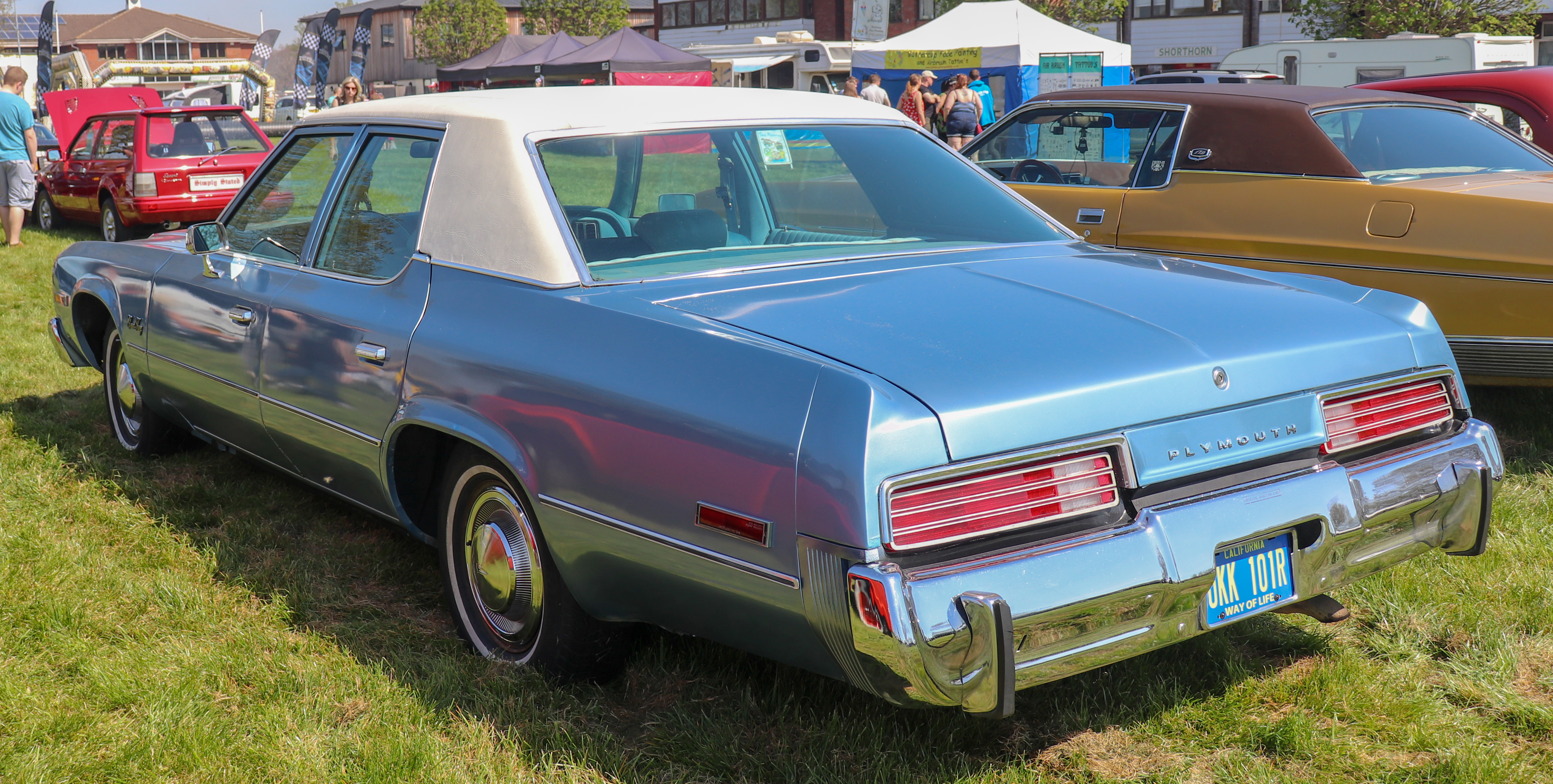
1977 Gran Fury 4-door sedan

This generation was available as a 2-door coupe, 2-door hardtop, 4-door sedan, 4-door hardtop, and 4-door station wagon. All models with the exception of the wagons rode on the 121.5 in (3,086 mm) wheelbase shared with the Dodge Monaco. Gran Fury Suburban wagons rode on a longer 124 in (3,150 mm) wheelbase that was also used by Monaco wagons and all full-sized Chryslers and Imperials. The 1975 Gran Fury was available in four trim levels: base (sedan and coupe only), "Custom" (all models), "Brougham" (coupe and hardtop only), and "Sport Suburban" (wagon only). Changes for 1976 were minimal. The 4-door hardtop body style was eliminated, leaving only coupes, sedans, and wagons. With this, sedans were now available in deluxe Brougham trim. Offerings were trimmed for the C-body Gran Fury's final model year, 1977. The mid-range Custom trim level was dropped, leaving only base and high-end Brougham coupes and sedans. 1977 Gran Fury wagons were available in either base Suburban or high-end Sport Suburban models. All full-sized C-body Plymouths were discontinued at the end of the 1977 model year, leaving the mid-size B-body Fury to soldier on as Plymouth's large car for 1978.

Sales of all of the Chrysler Corporation's C-body models for the 1974-1978 model years were considerably disappointing; the Plymouth Gran Fury was no exception. This is because 1973 introduction of the redesigned 1974 model year C-bodies coincided with the 1973 oil crisis. As gas prices skyrocketed, demand for gas-guzzling full-sized cars took a nosedive. C-body offerings decreased throughout the 1974-1978 design cycle. Imperials were the first to go after 1975. Plymouth and Dodge C-bodies were dropped after the 1977 model year. Chrysler C-bodies were discontinued after 1978. The discontinuation of the Gran Fury was followed by the discontinuation of the mid-size Fury after the 1978 model year. This huge gap in Plymouth's lineup left the compact Volaré as Plymouth's largest car for 1979. A redesigned downsized Gran Fury would return in 1980.

Production figures
| Year | Units |
|---|---|
| 1975 | 72,801 |
| 1976 | 39,511 |
| 1977 | 47,552 |
| Total production | 159,864 |

=== Engines ===
| Engine | Power | Years |
|---|---|---|
| 318 V8 | 145 hp (108 kW) | 1977 |
| 318 V8 | 150 hp (110 kW) | 1975–1976 |
| 360 V8 | 155 hp (116 kW) | 1977 |
| 360 V8 | 170 hp (130 kW) | 1976–1977 |
| 360 V8 | 175 hp (130 kW) | 1976 |
| 360 V8 | 180 hp (130 kW) | 1975 |
| 360 V8 | 190 hp (140 kW) | 1975 |
| 400 V8 | 175 hp (130 kW) | 1975–1976 |
| 400 V8 | 190 hp (140 kW) | 1977 |
| 400 V8 | 195 hp (145 kW) | 1975 |
| 440 V8 | 185 hp (138 kW) | 1977 |
| 440 V8 | 195 hp (145 kW) | 1977 |
| 440 V8 | 200 hp (150 kW) | 1976 |
| 440 V8 | 205 hp (153 kW) | 1976 |
| 440 V8 | 210 hp (160 kW) | 1975 |
| 440 V8 | 215 hp (160 kW) | 1975 |

== 1980–1981 ==
Second generation
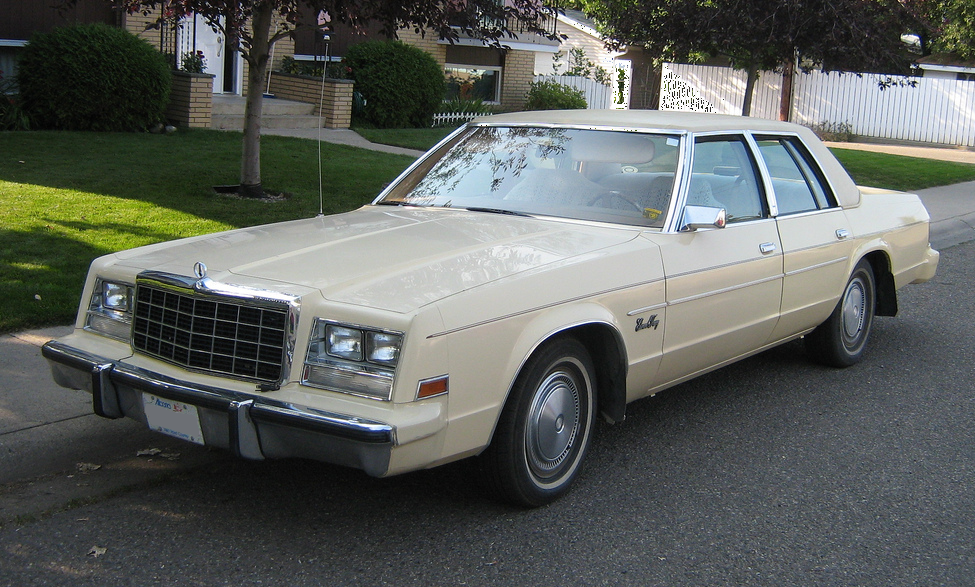
- R-body 1980 Plymouth Gran Fury Sedan

Overview
- Production: 1979–1981
- Model years: 1980–1981

Body and chassis
- Class: Full-size
- Body style: 4-door hardtop sedan
- Platform: R-body
- Related: Chrysler Fifth Avenue; Chrysler New Yorker; Chrysler Newport; Dodge St. Regis

Powertrain
- Engine: 3.7 L Slant 6 I6; 5.2 L LA V8; 5.9 L LA V8
- Transmission: 3-speed A727 automatic 3-speed A904 automatic

Dimensions
- Wheelbase: 118.5 in (3,010 mm)
- Length: 220.2 in (5,593 mm)
- Width: 77.6 in (1,971 mm)
- Height: 54.5 in (1,384 mm)
- Curb weight: 3,628 lb (1,646 kg)

When the downsized "R-body" cars were introduced for 1979, a Plymouth version was not included, as the low-end Chrysler Newport was intended to fill this gap. Although the Newport achieved this, and 1979 sales were fairly strong, there was still heavy demand for a full-sized Plymouth model. So finally in 1980 the Gran Fury returned after a two-model-year absence.

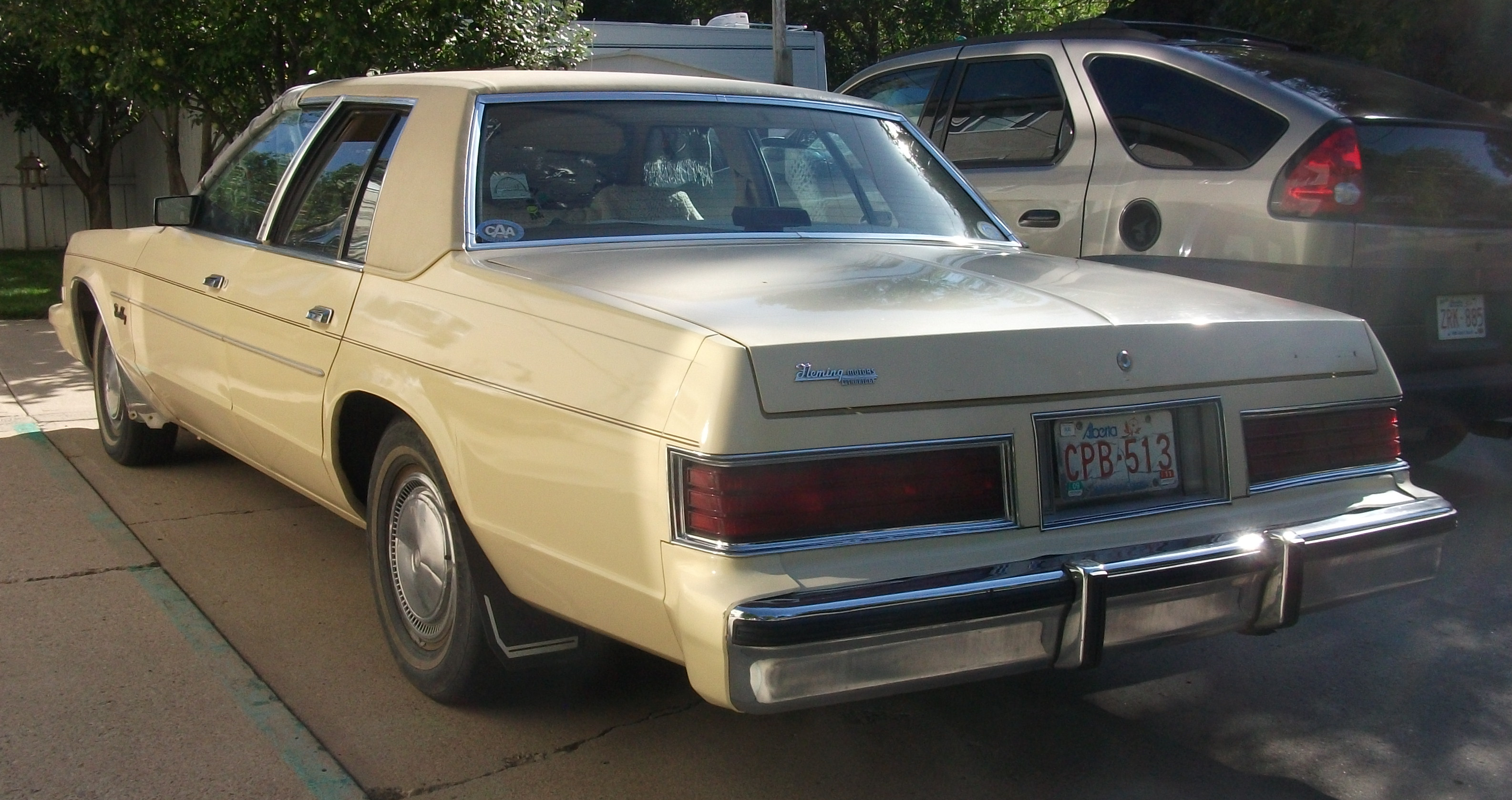
1980 Plymouth Gran Fury Sedan

This downsized Gran Fury was available only as a "pillared hardtop" 4-door sedan, this time based on the heavily restyled, but not re-engineered R platform, introduced in 1979 in response to redesigned Chevrolet and Ford models. The "new" R-body was heavily based on Chrysler's old mid-size B-body platform, introduced in 1962 and updated several times thereafter. Nearly identical to the concurrent Chrysler Newport, it was intended to satisfy dealer requests for a lower-priced full-size model but more importantly to fulfill fleet orders, primarily for police and taxi use.

The 1980 Plymouth Gran Fury was available in two versions, Base and Salon. Gran Fury Salon offered more standard features, including a vinyl-covered roof, higher-grade interior cloth, split-bench seat, chrome body-side trim, and deluxe wheel covers. Like its sibling, the Dodge St. Regis, the R-Body Gran Fury was very popular with fleet customers, especially police departments (by ordering the A38 Police Package coupled with a 195 bhp E58 360 cu in engine); both the Michigan State Police and the Ohio State Highway Patrol ordered substantial numbers of the cars. In light of this, the 1980 Gran Fury achieved the highest sales (18,750) of any R-body that year.

The second Generation Plymouth Gran Fury was short-lived, being discontinued midway through the 1981 model year along with the other R-body models due to slow sales. This can be mainly attributed to poor fuel economy, as well as its outdated platform. The 1981 Gran Fury was also the last true full-size car to bear the Plymouth name, until the brand's demise twenty years later.

Production figures
| Year | Units |
|---|---|
| 1980 | 14,600 |
| 1981 | 7,719 |
| Total production | 22,319 |

=== Engines ===
| Engine | Displacement | Power | Torque | Years |
|---|---|---|---|---|
| 3.7 Inline 6 | 3,682 cm^{3} (224.7 cu in) | 85 hp (63 kW) @ 3600 | 165 lb⋅ft (224 N⋅m) @ 1600 | 1981 |
| 3.7 Inline 6 | 3,682 cm^{3} (224.7 cu in) | 90 hp (67 kW) @ 3600 | 160 lb⋅ft (220 N⋅m) @ 1600 | 1980 |
| 5.2 V8 | 5,210 cm^{3} (318 cu in) | 120 hp (89 kW) @ 3600 | 245 lb⋅ft (332 N⋅m) @ 1600 | 1980 |
| 5.2 V8 | 5,210 cm^{3} (318 cu in) | 130 hp (97 kW) @ 4000 | 230 lb⋅ft (310 N⋅m) @ 2000 | 1981 |
| 5.2 V8 | 5,210 cm^{3} (318 cu in) | 155 hp (116 kW) @ 4000 | 240 lb⋅ft (330 N⋅m) @ 2000 | 1980 |
| 5.2 V8 | 5,210 cm^{3} (318 cu in) | 165 hp (123 kW) @ 4000 | 240 lb⋅ft (330 N⋅m) @ 2000 | 1981 |
| 5.9 V8 | 5,898 cm^{3} (359.9 cu in) | 130 hp (97 kW) @ 3200 | 255 lb⋅ft (346 N⋅m) @ 2000 | 1980 |

== 1982–1989 ==
Third generation
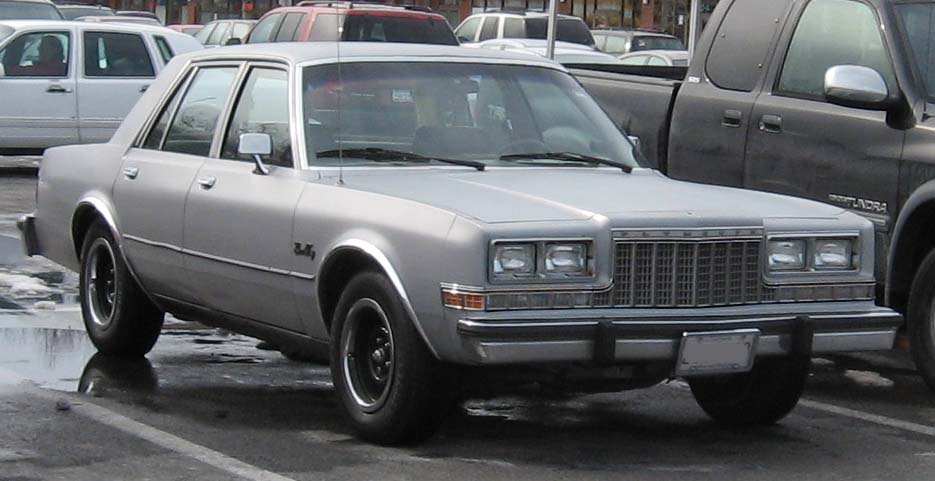
- M-body Plymouth Gran Fury 4-door Sedan

Overview
- Also called: Plymouth Caravelle (Canada); Plymouth Caravelle Salon (Canada)
- Production: 1981–1988 (United States); 1977–1988 (Canada)
- Model years: 1982–1989 (United States); 1978–1989 (Canada)

Body and chassis
- Class: Mid-size
- Body style: 4-door wagon (Canada: 1978–1982); 4-door sedan (United States: 1982–1989; Canada: 1978–1989); 2-door coupe (Canada: 1978–1982)
- Platform: M-body
- Related: Chrysler Fifth Avenue (1984–1989); Chrysler New Yorker Fifth Avenue (1983); Chrysler New Yorker (1982); Chrysler LeBaron (1977–1981); Dodge Diplomat (1977–1989)

Powertrain
- Engine: 3.7 L Slant 6 I6; 5.2 L LA V8
- Transmission: 3-speed A727 automatic 3-speed A904 automatic 3-speed A999 automatic

Dimensions
- Wheelbase: 112.6 in (2,860 mm)
- Length: 204.6 in (5,197 mm)
- Width: 72.4 in (1,839 mm)
- Height: 55.1 in (1,400 mm)

In 1982, Plymouth downsized the Gran Fury again, this time sharing the mid-size M platform with the Chrysler Fifth Avenue (called Chrysler New Yorker/New Yorker Fifth Avenue for 1982 and 1983) and the Dodge Diplomat. In addition to the R-body Gran Fury, the M-body Gran Fury replaced the M-body Chrysler LeBaron, which had moved to the compact K platform that year. Now considered a mid-sized car, this generation Gran Fury was close to the exterior size of what was once the compact Valiant and Volaré but offered more interior room. The M-body was in fact heavily based on the Volaré's F platform. Like its predecessor, the 1982 Gran Fury was introduced later than its Chrysler and Dodge siblings; the Chrysler LeBaron and Dodge Diplomat had used the M-body since 1977.

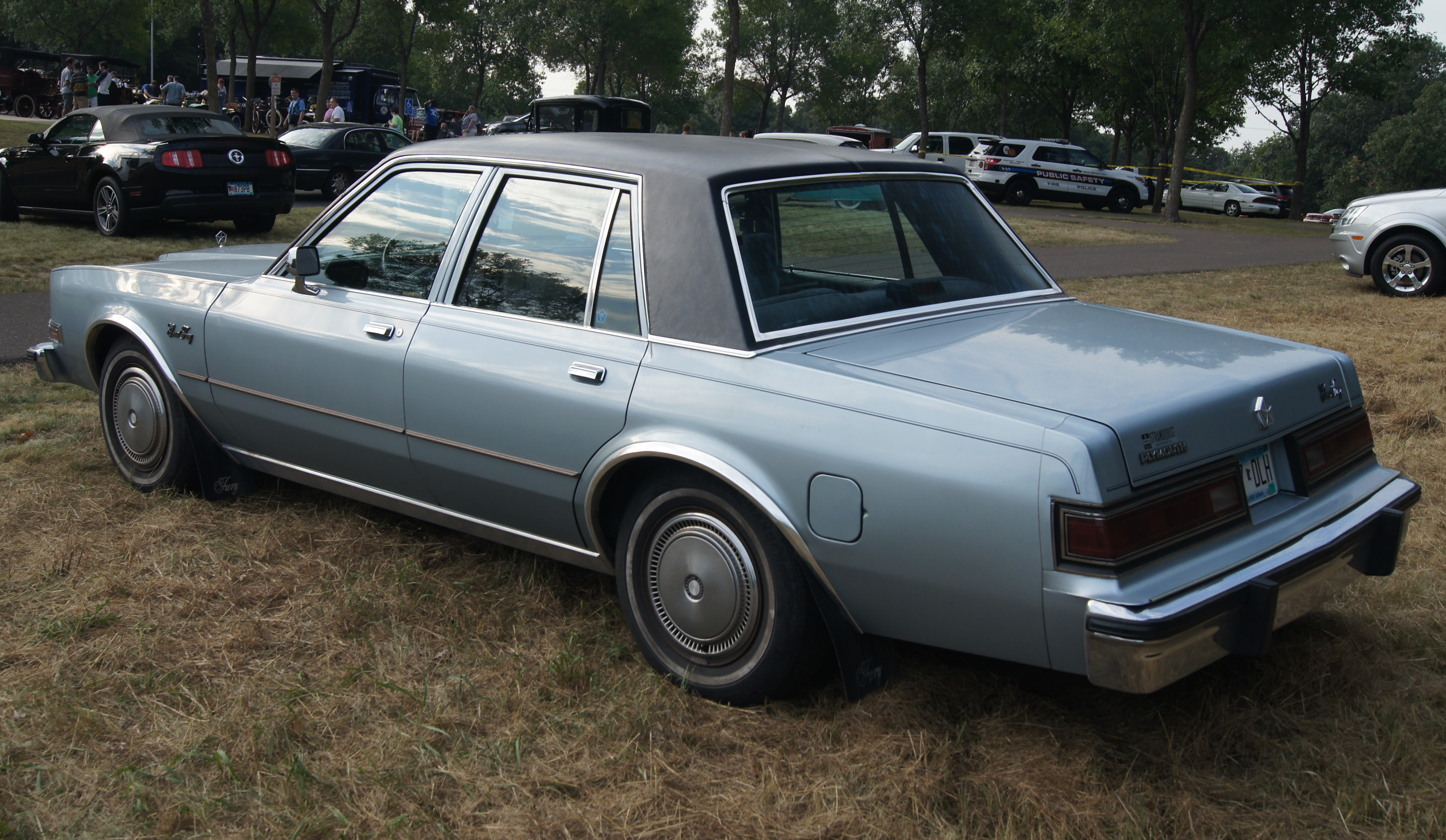
1986 Plymouth Gran Fury Salon

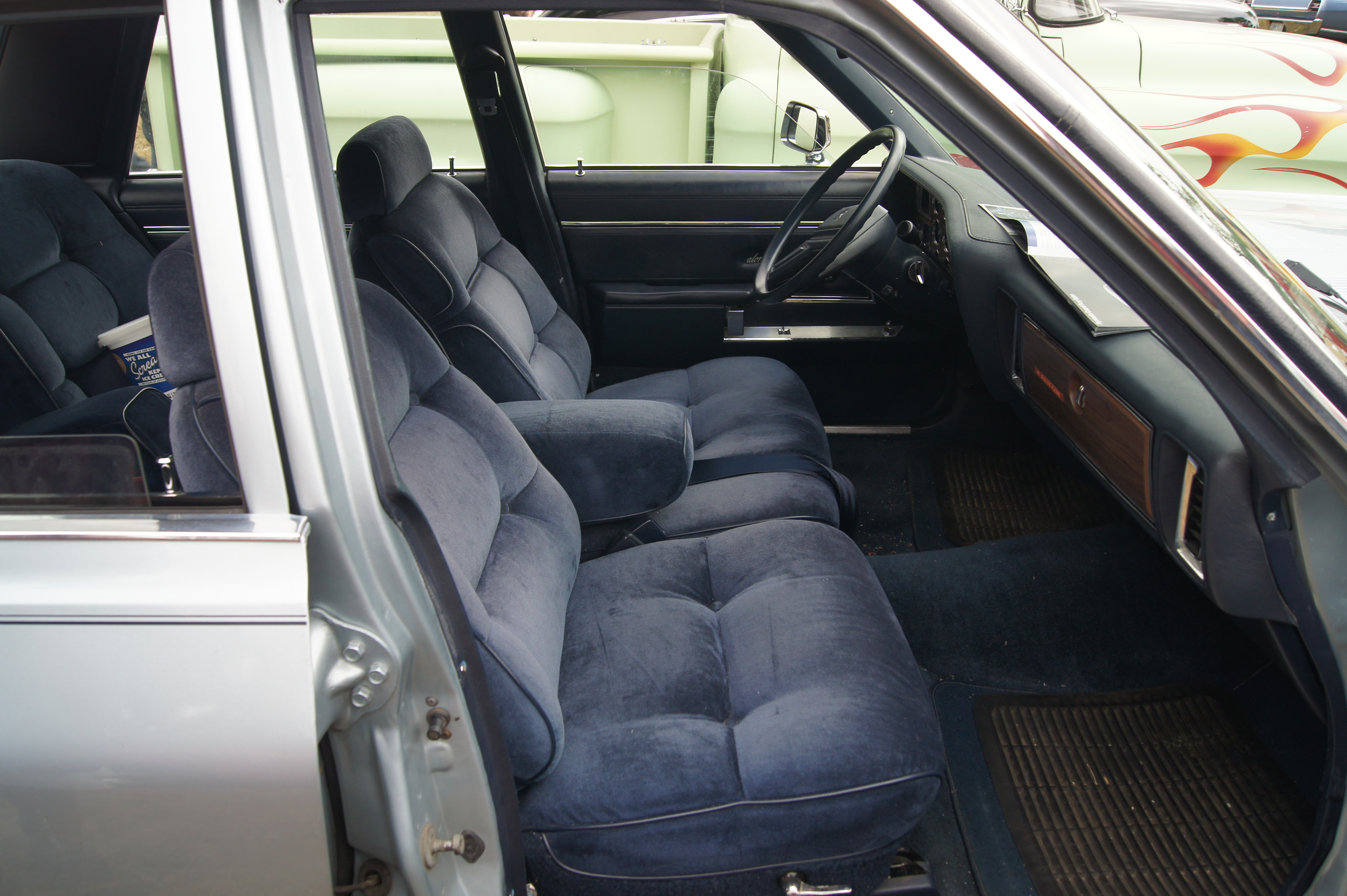
1986 Plymouth Gran Fury sedan interior

For 1979, all M-body coupes were offered with 2 different roof treatments. The Chrysler LeBaron, Dodge Diplomat, Plymouth Gran Fury (in the U.S.) and Caravelle Salon (in Canada), had a more formal rear side window treatment with a tall, narrow rectangular shape, rather than the “triangle” shape of the standard trim model. This more formal coupe was only sold for one year.

1982-1989 Plymouth Gran Fury shared the Dodge Diplomat's front and rear fascias. They were virtually identical with the exception of badging. Once again, the third generation Gran Fury was available in base and higher-end "Salon" trim. As in previous years, the higher-volume Gran Fury base model catered more towards fleet customers while Gran Fury Salons were geared more towards private customers and offered options such as full vinyl roofs, velour upholstery, turbine-spoke wheels, power windows, and power locks.

Although available to retail buyers, Gran Fury was far more popular with police departments and other fleet buyers, primarily since the car was reasonably priced and had a conventional drivetrain with proven components that could withstand a good deal of abuse. The Gran Fury, however, was much less powerful than both its Big Three competitors as well as the Chrysler Corporation's earlier police offerings. The most powerful engine available to police departments was a 165 hp (123 kW) iteration of the 318 ci V8, capable of an 18.16 second quartermile in period testing - slower than the 90-hp Volkswagen Rabbit GTi.

This generation of the Gran Fury sold in respectable numbers. However, despite having the same base prices as the Gran Fury (just under $12,000 USD for their final year), the Diplomat always outsold it, usually by several thousand units each year. The Chrysler Fifth Avenue's total sales were always more than that of the Gran Fury and Diplomat by far, even though it generally cost about $6,000 USD more. This last car to carry the Gran Fury nameplate remained largely unchanged for its 7-year run. Declining sales, a lack of promotion, and technical obsolescence—the platform dated back to the 1976 Plymouth Volare and Dodge Aspen—eventually contributed to the model's demise in early 1989. That year, a driver-side airbag became standard; this would be the last RWD Plymouth until the introduction of the Prowler. While Dodge offered the 1990 Monaco, and later the 1993 Intrepid, Chrysler never replaced the Gran Fury with any other large car in the remainder of the Plymouth brand's existence until its demise in the 2001 model year.

Production figures
| Year | Units |
|---|---|
| 1982 | 18,111 |
| 1983 | 15,739 |
| 1984 | 14,516 |
| 1985 | 19,102 |
| 1986 | 14,761 |
| 1987 | 10,377 |
| 1988 | 11,421 |
| 1989 | 4,985 |
| Total production | 109,012 |

=== Engines ===
| Engine | Displacement | Power | Torque | Years |
|---|---|---|---|---|
| 3.7 Inline 6 | 3,682 cm^{3} (224.7 cu in) | 90 hp (67 kW) @ 3600 | 165 lb⋅ft (224 N⋅m) @ 1600 | 1982–1983 |
| 5.2 V8 | 5,210 cm^{3} (318 cu in) | 130 hp (97 kW) @ 4000 | 230 lb⋅ft (310 N⋅m) @ 2000 | 1982–1984 |
| 5.2 V8 | 5,210 cm^{3} (318 cu in) | 140 hp (100 kW) @ 3600 | 265 lb⋅ft (359 N⋅m) @ 1600 | 1985–1989 |
| 5.2 V8 Police | 5,210 cm^{3} (318 cu in) | 165 hp (123 kW) @ 4000 | 240 lb⋅ft (330 N⋅m) @ 2000 | 1982–1984 |
| 5.2 V8 Police | 5,210 cm^{3} (318 cu in) | 175 hp (130 kW) @ 4000 | 250 lb⋅ft (340 N⋅m) @ 3200 | 1985–1989 |

== Canada ==
The car that later became the M-body Gran Fury was also sold in Canada from 1978 to 1989 as the Plymouth Caravelle, badged "Caravelle Salon" after the midsize front-drive Plymouth Caravelle was released in Canada for 1983. Although the Diplomat and LeBaron appeared on the market in mid-1977, the Caravelle was introduced in the fall of 1977 as a 1978 model. It was sold only by Canadian Plymouth dealers and was not available in the U.S., though the midsize front-drive car was offered in the U.S. market starting in 1985. In addition to the sedan body style, the Canadian Caravelle was offered in 2-door coupe and 4-door station wagon form through 1982. An interesting note is that for 1979, all M-body coupes were offered with 2 different roof treatments. The upscale trim model, called Caravelle “Salon”, had a more formal rear side window treatment with a tall, narrow rectangular shape, rather than the “triangle” shape of the standard model. This more formal coupe was only sold for one year. T-top also available. SE top trim level, two tone paint option, sunroof option.

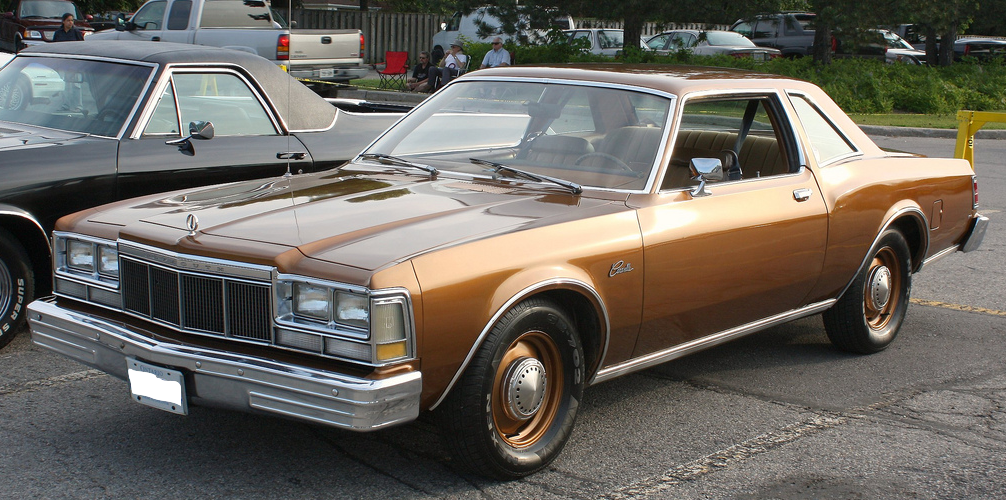
1978 Plymouth Caravelle coupe

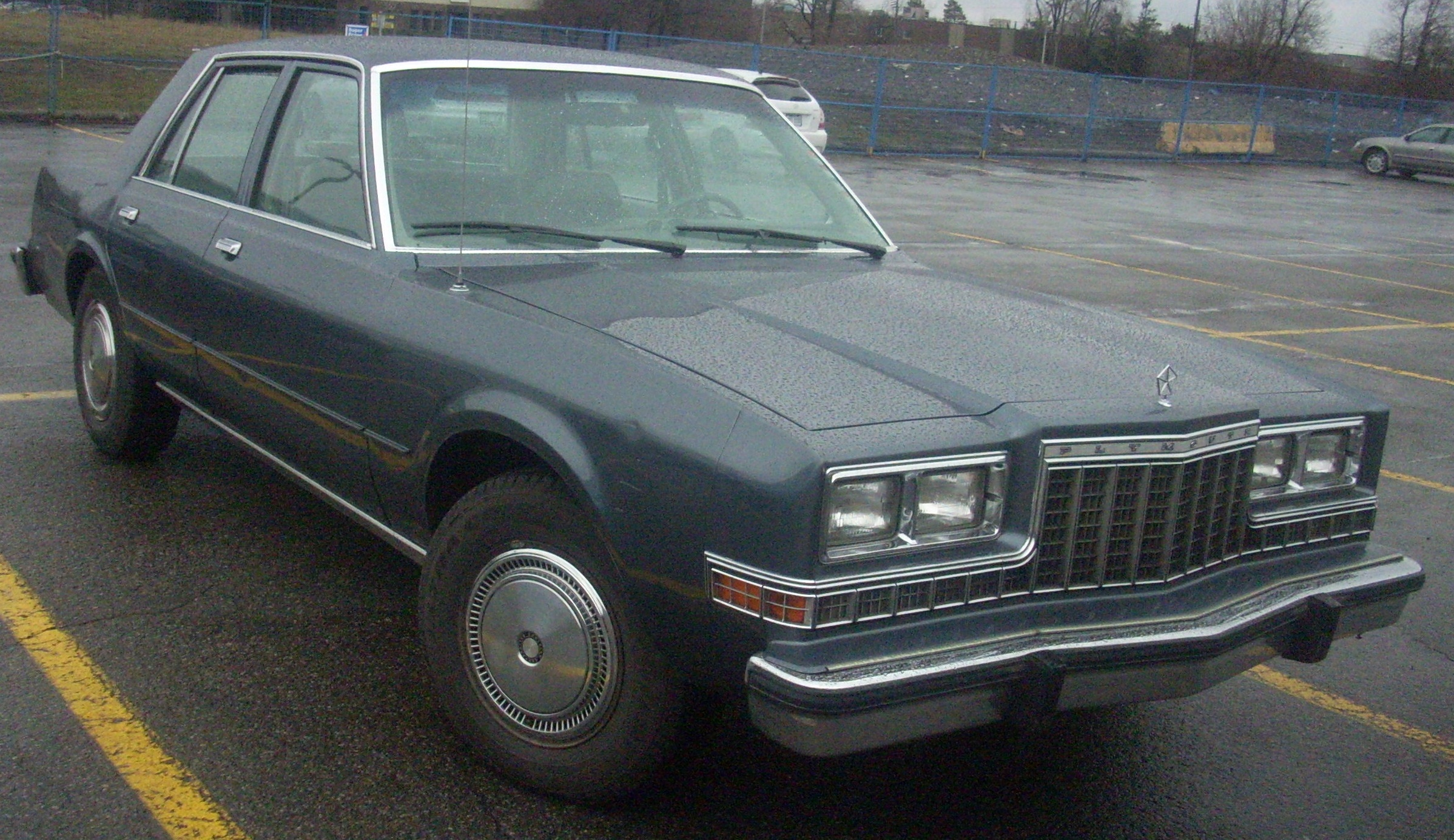
1986 Plymouth Caravelle Salon
