= Dodge Aspen =

Dodge Aspen Plymouth Volaré
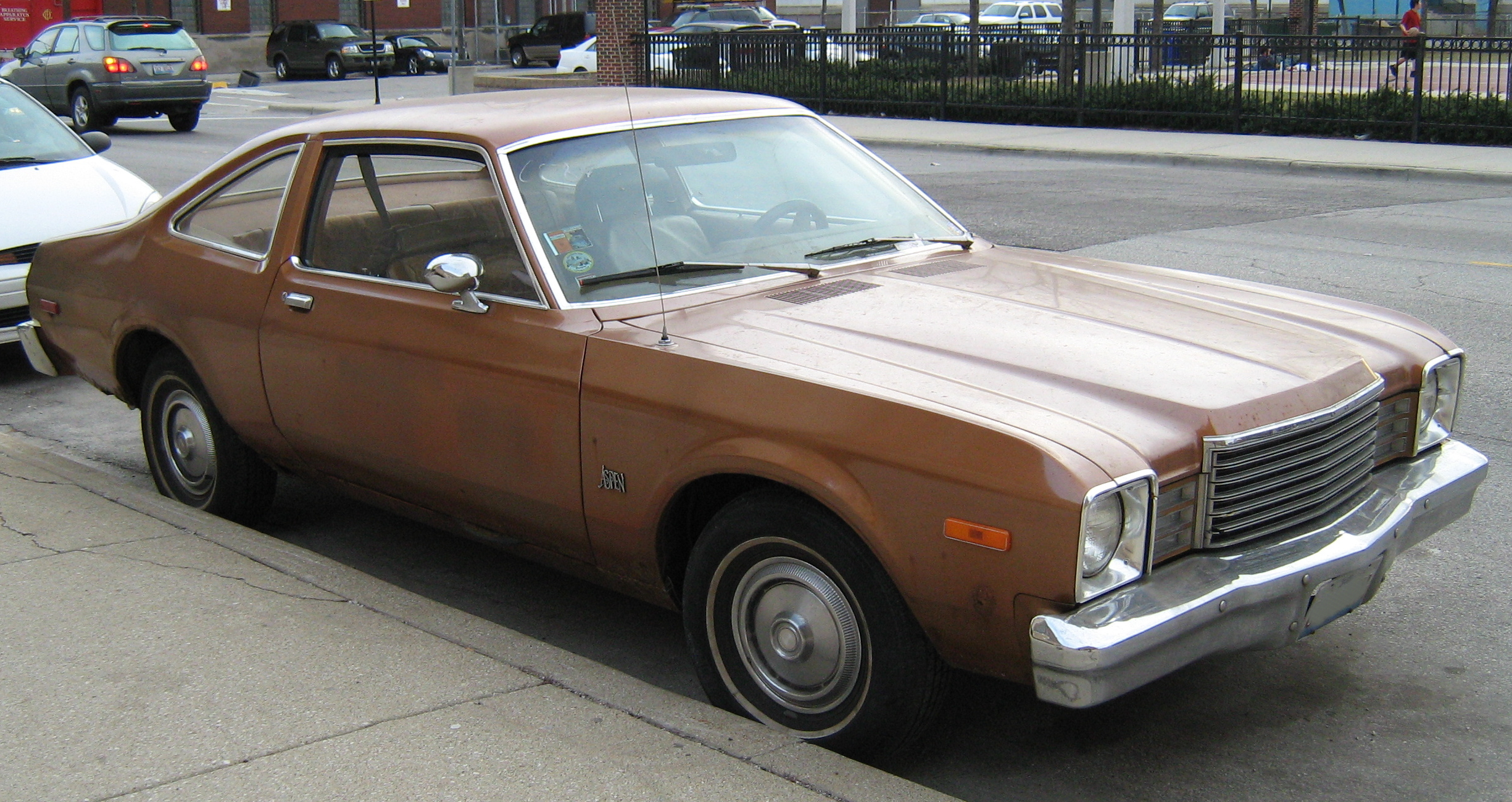
- Dodge Aspen coupe

Overview
- Manufacturer: Chrysler Corporation
- Also called: Chrysler Valiant Volaré (Mexico); Dodge Dart (Mexico and Colombia)
- Production: 1976–1980
- Model years: 1976–1980
- Assembly: United States: Hamtramck, Michigan (Dodge Main Assembly); United States: Newark, Delaware (Newark Assembly); Mexico: Mexico City (Lago Alberto Assembly); Colombia: Bogotá

Body and chassis
- Class: Compact
- Body style: 5-door station wagon; 4-door sedan; 2-door coupe
- Layout: FR layout
- Platform: Chrysler F platform
- Related: Dodge Diplomat; Plymouth Gran Fury; Plymouth Caravelle; Chrysler Fifth Avenue

Powertrain
- Engine: 225 cu in (3.7 L) Slant-6; 318 cu in (5.2 L) LA V8; 360 cu in (5.9 L) LA V8
- Transmission: A230 3-speed manual; A904 3-speed TorqueFlite automatic; A998/A999 3-speed TorqueFlite automatic; A833 4-speed OD manual

Dimensions
- Wheelbase: 108.7 in (2,761 mm) (coupe); 112.7 in (2,863 mm) (sedan & wagon)
- Length: 198.8 in (5,050 mm) (coupe); 201.2 in (5,110 mm) (sedan & wagon)
- Width: 73.3 in (1,862 mm)
- Height: 53.3 in (1,354 mm) (coupe); 55.3 in (1,405 mm) (sedan); 55.7 in (1,415 mm) (wagon)
- Curb weight: 3,200 lb (1,500 kg) (base coupe)

Chronology
- Predecessor: Plymouth Valiant / Dodge Dart
- Successor: Dodge Aries / Plymouth Reliant; Dodge 400/Chrysler LeBaron (1982)

The Dodge Aspen is a compact car that was marketed by Dodge from the 1976 to 1980 model years. Deriving its name from the tree and the ski-resort city, the Aspen was the successor to the 1960–1976 Dodge Dart. The Plymouth division sold the model line as the Plymouth Volaré (Volare = "to fly" in Italian), replacing the Plymouth Valiant.

The model line marked the debut of the all-new Chrysler F platform, which became the ground-up redesign of the Chrysler compact line since its 1960 debut. While the two-door coupe lost the hardtop roofline of the Dart/Valiant, the Aspen/Volaré were also offered as a four-door sedan and a five-door station wagon (marking the return of the Chrysler compact wagon for the first time since 1966).

The Aspen and Volaré were both released during a period when the American Big Three were actively downsizing their entire product lines: full-size to compact vehicles were affected. As model redesigns reached production, the central factor behind them was reduction of both exterior footprint and curb weight to improve fuel economy, with the industry reclassifying the size nomenclature of existing model lines. While considered a compact car upon its 1976 launch, the 1980 Dodge Aspen (otherwise identical in size) was considered an intermediate car (a precursor of the modern mid-size car); it is longer than the full-size LX/LY Dodge Charger.

During its production, the Aspen and Volaré were assembled by Chrysler in its Newark Assembly (Newark, Delaware) and Dodge Main Assembly (Hamtramck, Michigan) facilities; the end of production marked the demise of the latter facility, which closed the same day. After the 1980 model year, the Chrysler F platform vehicles were replaced directly with its front-wheel drive K-Cars: the Dodge Aries and Plymouth Reliant.

== Background ==
The Volaré and the Aspen were introduced mid-cycle for model year 1976 as successors to the Chrysler "A-platform" models, the Plymouth Valiant/Plymouth Duster and Dodge Dart. During the 1976 model year, Valiant/Duster models were marketed alongside the Volaré at Chrysler/Plymouth dealerships, and the Dart models were marketed alongside the Aspen at Dodge dealerships. After the 1976 model year, Valiant and Dart models were discontinued.

Chrysler conceived the Volaré and Aspen as modern, fuel-efficient cars, more luxurious than their Valiant and Dart predecessors. They were together named Motor Trend Car of the Year for 1976, and they were noted by Consumer Reports magazine for their modern design and good performance. The Volaré and Aspen ultimately suffered numerous quality problems, frequent product recalls, and early rust damage that seriously damaged the cars' reputation and sales.

== Production history ==
During development, the Volaré/Aspen models were extensively wind-tunnel tested to improve their aerodynamics, reduce wind drag and improve fuel economy, improve crosswind stability, reduce wind noise, and increase interior ventilation performance. The testing led designers to soften the front end contours and remove roof-drip moldings, and at the same time improve internal airflow ducting. Body engineering for the Volaré/Aspen implemented computer-aided design and clear plastic stress models to reveal stress points in the design phase before any sheet metal was formed, to reduce weight and improve fuel economy by using thinner glass, lighter side door beams, and high-strength/low alloy steel (HSLA) — four times as strong as conventional mild steel. A reduced number of steel stampings offered improved panel fits with fewer welds. Larger glass areas increased visibility, with a total glass area increase of 25% on two-door models and 33% on sedans.

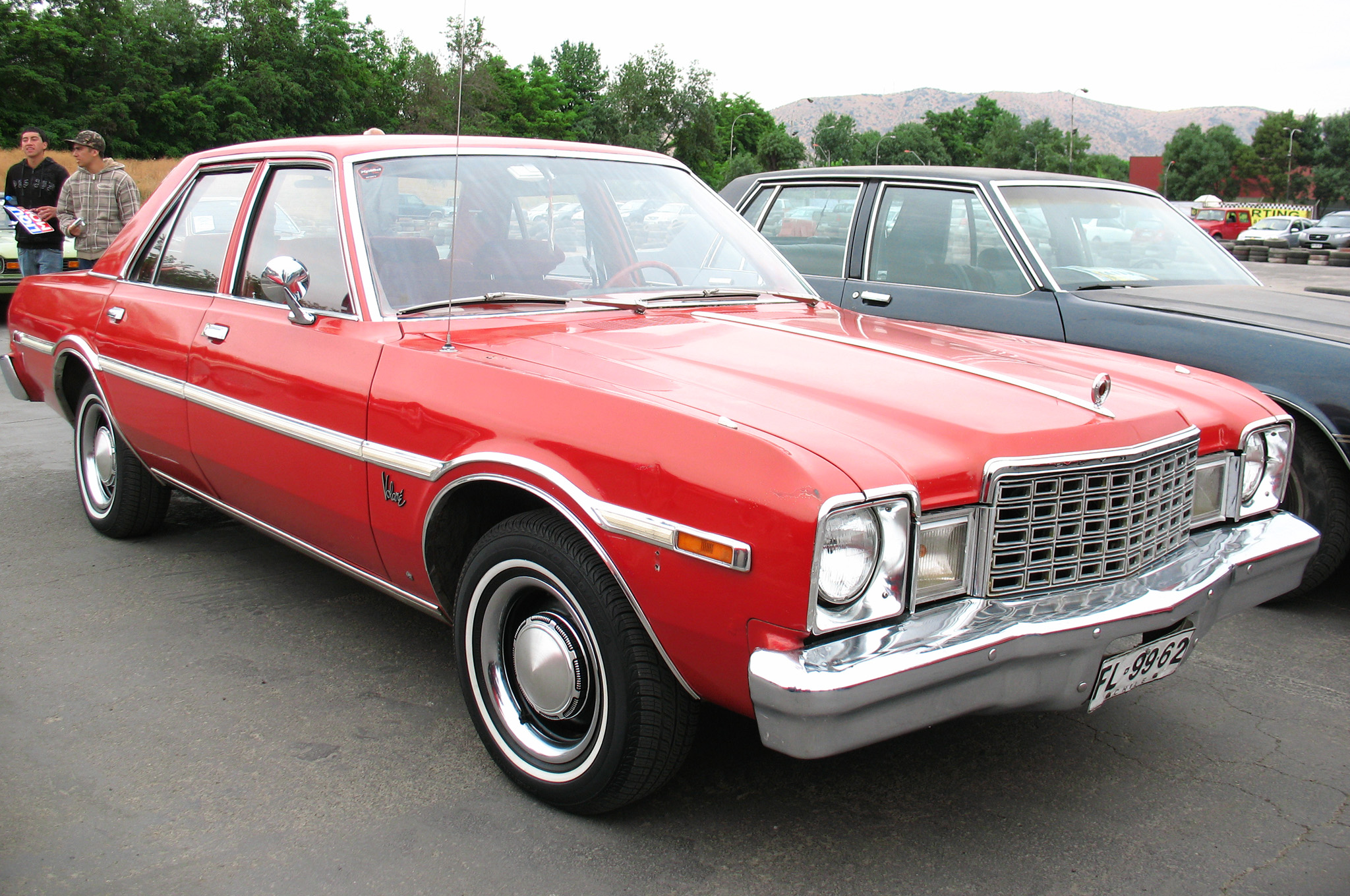
1977 Plymouth Volaré sedan

With the Volare/Aspen twins, Chrysler introduced a new front suspension system using crossed torsion bars mounted transversely beneath the engine (marketed as Isolated Transverse Suspension System), provided a noticeable improvement over Chrysler's long used longitudinal torsion bar suspension, introduced in 1957. The new torsion bar system, though not geometrically as favorable as its predecessor, saved space and weight — as was marketed as giving a "big car ride" with a softer, fore-and-aft compliance. This allowed the wheels to move rearward, instead of straight up and down, when the tires encountered an object, thereby damping the blow and "rolling with" the bump rather than resisting it. The two transverse torsion bars were mounted along with an anti-sway bar forward of the front wheels, integrating both into a spring-strut front suspension. These components were attached to a K-shaped structural cross member, which itself was isolated from the unitized car body by four rubber mounts. The steering column was also rubber-isolated. Wheel alignment adjustments such as caster and camber could be made by removing plates over the wheel housings. Chrysler Corporation also employed the Isolated Transverse Suspension System with their M- and J-platform models.

The rear suspension of the Volaré/Aspen was more traditional for Chrysler passenger cars, using a conventional leaf spring (semi-elliptical) suspension system. However, this leaf spring arrangement was also rubber-isolated, which eliminated a metal-to-metal path through which road noise or vibration could be transmitted to the body.

Several 1976 Dodge Aspen sedans served as test vehicles for a gas turbine engine installation, in a project sponsored by the United States Department of Energy. Testing began in August 1976. This new turbine engine was a smaller version of Chrysler Corporation's earlier turbine engine. At the time, the hope was that turbine engines would be cleaner and more efficient than comparably powerful V8 engines, but numerous technical challenges eventually ended automotive turbine engine development.

=== Marketing ===
According to R. M. "Ham" Schirmer, manager of Dodge car and corporate advertising for Chrysler, the "Aspen" name originated from the codename "Aspen-Vail" when development for it and the Plymouth "sister car" began in 1971. "Aspen is a very pleasant name", Schirmer said, "people think of the outdoors, but not necessarily skiing when they hear it ... it won't inhibit where we want to position the car because it's basically neutral." Nonetheless, Chrysler sponsored the 1976 Dodge Aspen Team K2 Freestyle and opened up World Pro Skiing's seventh season, in Aspen, Colorado, as the Dodge Aspen Cup, running courses on Aspen Highlands and Aspen Mountain. Actor Rex Harrison served as pitchman in an advertising campaign for the Dodge Aspen that was inspired by the "Ascot Gavotte" scene in the 1964 movie My Fair Lady, which starred Harrison. In TV and radio advertisements, Harrison performed a patter song using the word "unbelievable" spoken in rhythm.

A closeup view of the name decal on a baby blue classic 1976 Plymouth Volaré parked on the streets of San Diego, California - U.S.A.

The "Volaré" name is Spanish for "I will fly away" or "I will blow away"; it is also Italian for "to fly". In print and broadcast media, singer Sergio Franchi was featured in Volaré advertisements. Franchi sang the pop song "Volare", with altered lyrics, in TV and radio commercials for the car. (The accent mark used in the car's name is not in the Italian word or the song title; Volaré commercials described it as an "accent on quality".)

A baby blue classic 1976 Plymouth Volaré parked on the streets of San Diego, California - U.S.A.

=== 1976 ===
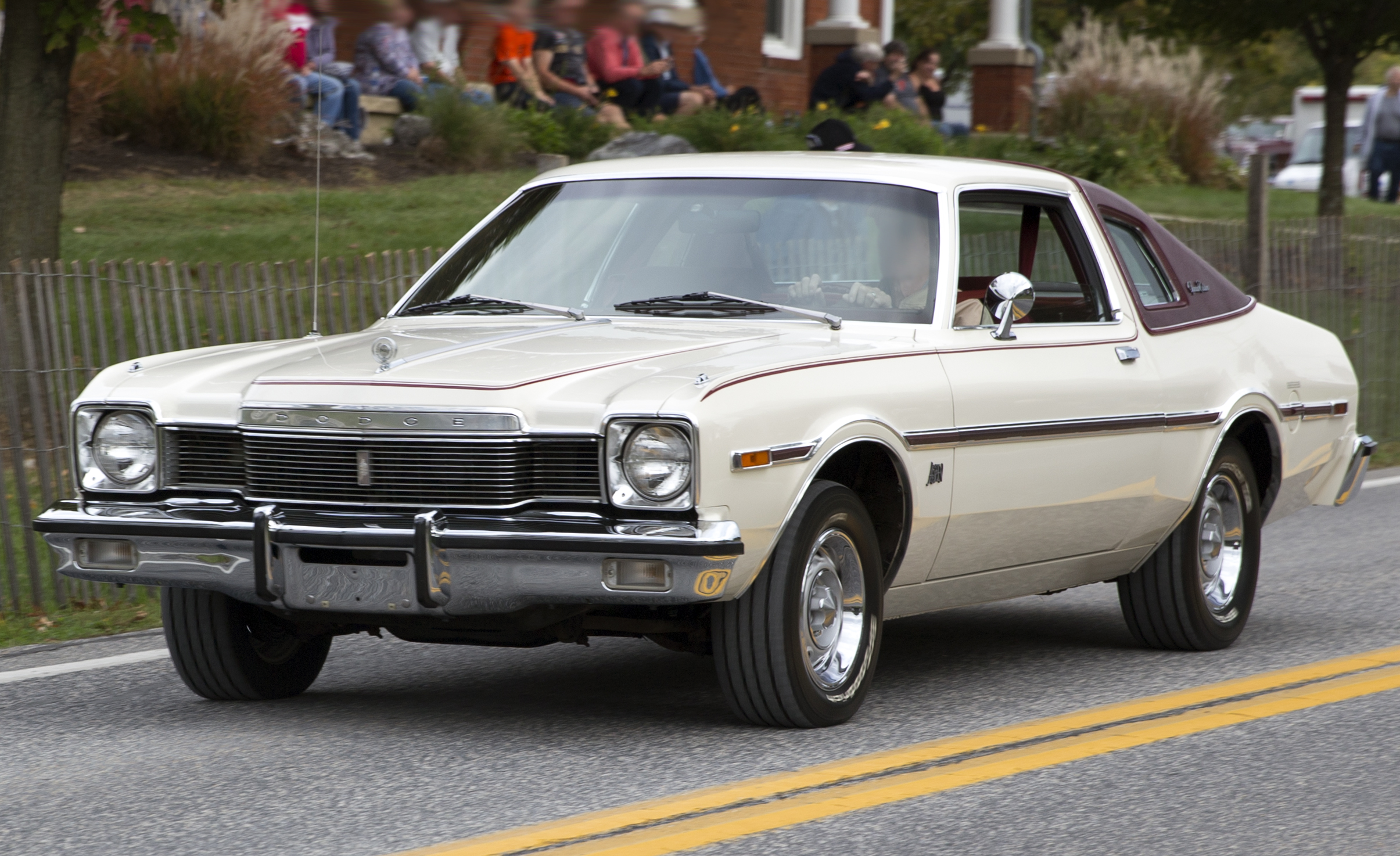
1976 Dodge Aspen SE coupe

As replacements for the venerable Plymouth Valiant and Dodge Dart, the Volaré/Aspen twins shared the same engine and transmission choices and three-box body style with their predecessors, but not much else.

Available as a four-door wagon, four-door sedan or a two-door coupe, Volaré/Aspen models came in three trim levels: The base model, the "custom" (for both models), and the "Premier" for the Volaré and "SE" (special edition) for the Aspen.

In their introductory year, the Volaré and the Aspen differed only in their rear taillight styling, front grille and parking light location, and location of their side trim strips (lower for the Volaré, higher for the Aspen). Their interiors were completely identical and lacked any kind of branding or differentiation as it was not possible to tell from inside the car whether it was a Volaré or an Aspen. Body styles, engine and transmission options, colors, trim options, and other features were identical.

Coupes featured frameless door glass but—likely to improve rollover safety—a thick "B" pillar was used, replacing the popular hardtop body style of the Valiant and Dart. The "performance" packages (Road Runner for the Volaré, R/T for the Aspen) were available only on two-door models; they featured mostly trim items and heavy duty suspension systems. The standard engine was Chrysler's 225 cu in (3.7 L) slant six, and was available with a single-barrel carburetor. Optional engines were a 318 cu in (5.2 L) V8 or a 360 cu in (5.9 L) V8, both with two-barrel carburetors.

Total production was 189,900 (Aspen) and 255,008 (Volaré).

=== 1977 ===
The second model year for the Volaré/Aspen was mostly a carryover, but there were some significant changes. The standard 225 cu in (3.7 L) slant-six engine was supplemented by an optional "Super Six" version that employed a two-barrel carburetor; this setup had previously been available in Australian and Latin American markets roughly ten years prior. Along with improved performance, this option also helped with the poor drivability problems that plagued the 1976 models. A new T-top removable roof panel option was available for the coupe. Both the Volaré and the Aspen coupe models also offered "performance" appearance packages that consisted of front and rear spoilers, wheel opening flares, and louvered rear windows; the Volaré Road Runner package called these additional options the "Fun Runner" options, while the Aspen R/T package called these additions the "Super Pak" option.

The Plymouth Volaré was Canada's top-selling car this year. Total production was 327,739 (Volaré) and 266,012 (Aspen).

=== 1978 ===
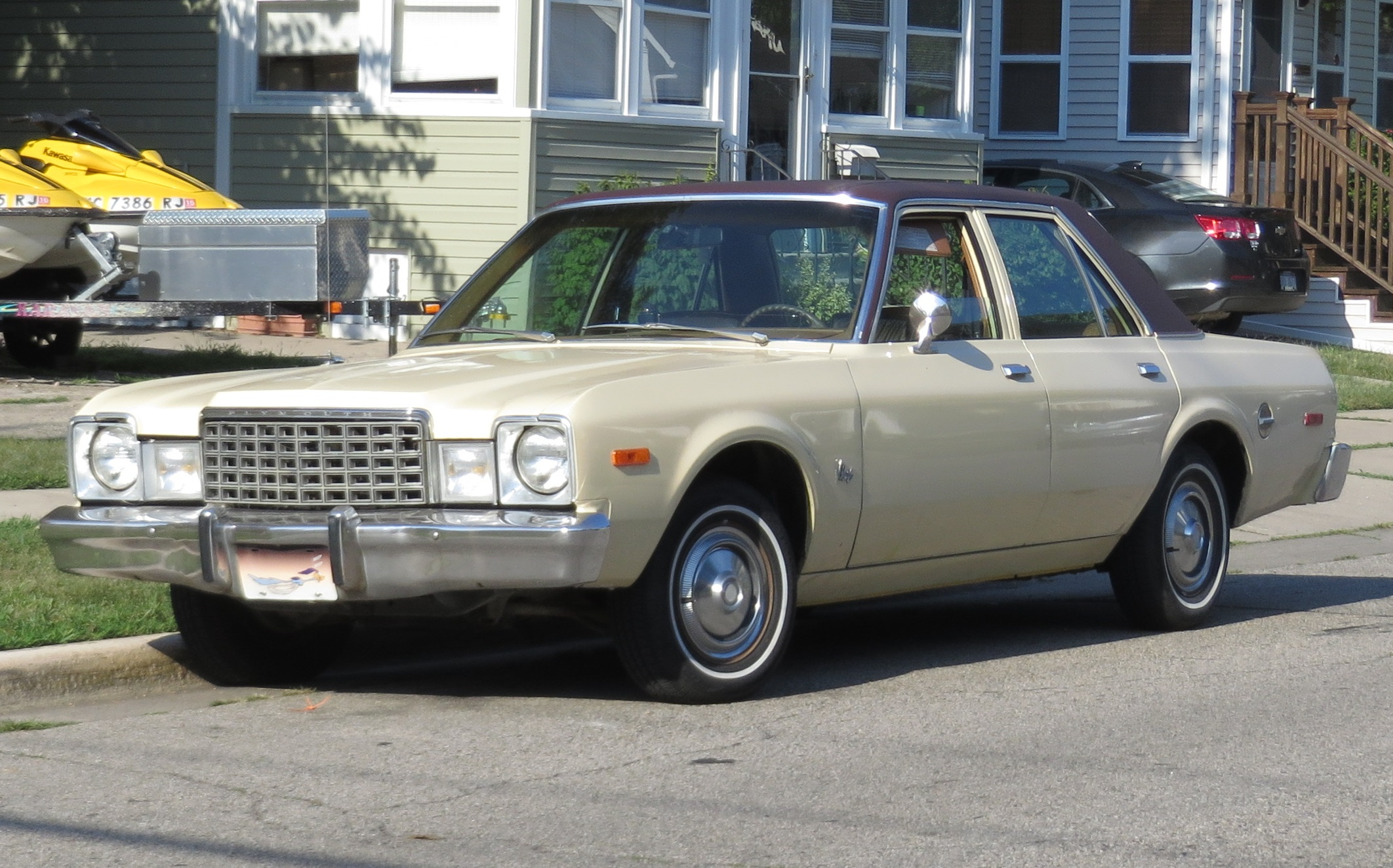
1978 Plymouth Volaré

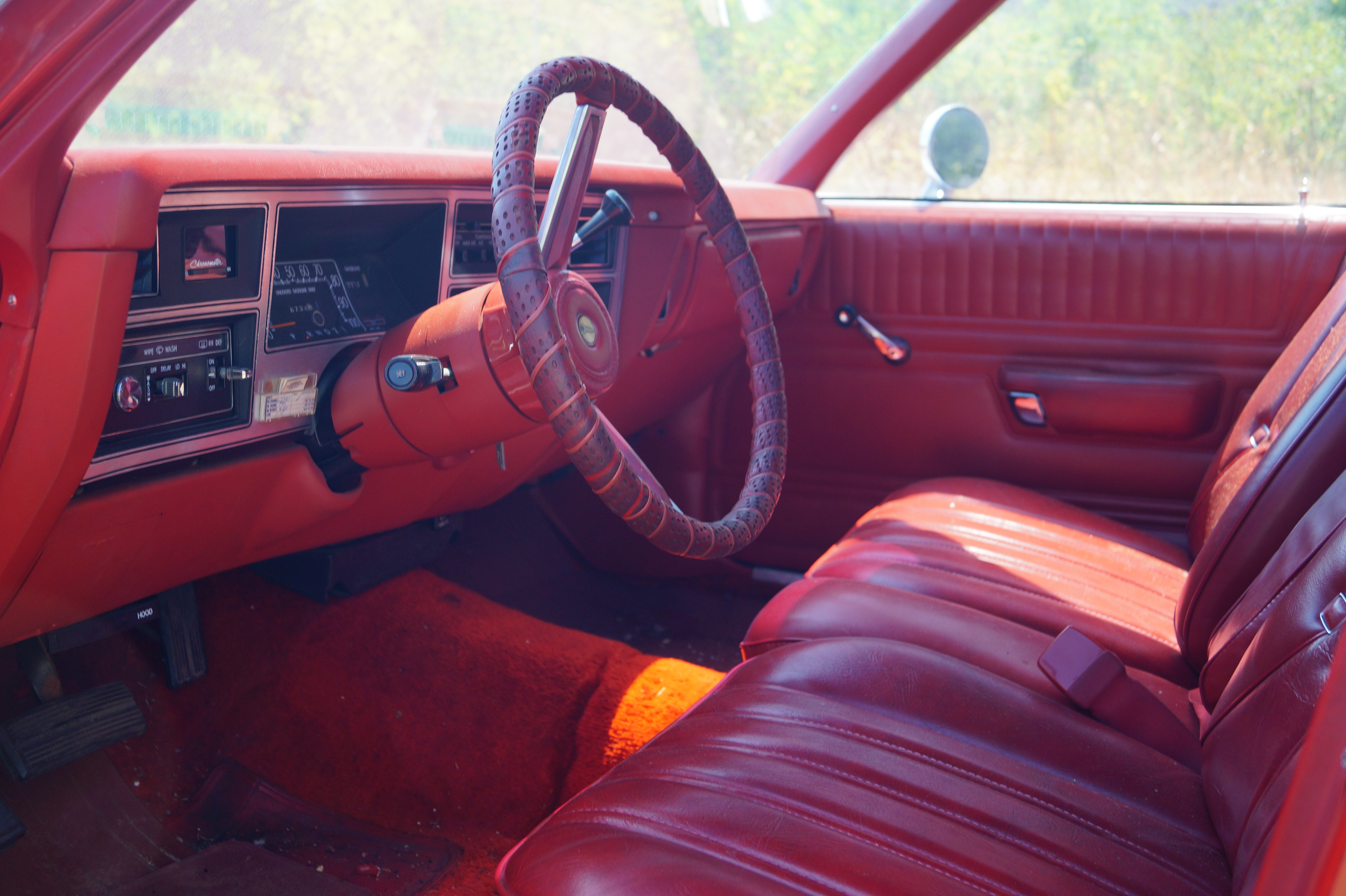
1978 Plymouth Volaré interior

The trim line arrangement was changed for 1978. Instead of having separate base, custom, and high-line Volaré premier/Aspen SE models, there was simply the base model, to which the buyer could add custom and premier/SE option packages. For their third production year, the Volaré and Aspen received their first visual update in the form of new front grille and fascia treatments. Starting with the 1978 model year, the standard three-speed manual transmission was no longer available with its shift lever mounted on the steering column; both the standard three-speed and the four-speed overdrive transmissions were only available with their shift levers mounted on the floor. New performance and trim packages for both models included the "kit car" and the "Super Coupe", which combined performance trim with the 360 cu in (5.9 L) V8, but the six-cylinder engine was standard.

The Volaré or Aspen "kit car", made in honor of NASCAR legend Richard Petty, was supposed to look as much like a race car as possible. The wheels had no hubcaps, the wheel opening flares had a bolted-on look, and even the windshield had metal tie-downs just like the race cars. Unlike a race car, the kit car came standard with an automatic transmission. A special addition was a decal kit with large door mountable "43" decals and "360" decals for the hood. These decals were shipped in the trunk either to be installed by the dealer or by the owner. It was available in blue for the Volaré or red for the Aspen. Only 131 Dodges and 145 Plymouths were built.

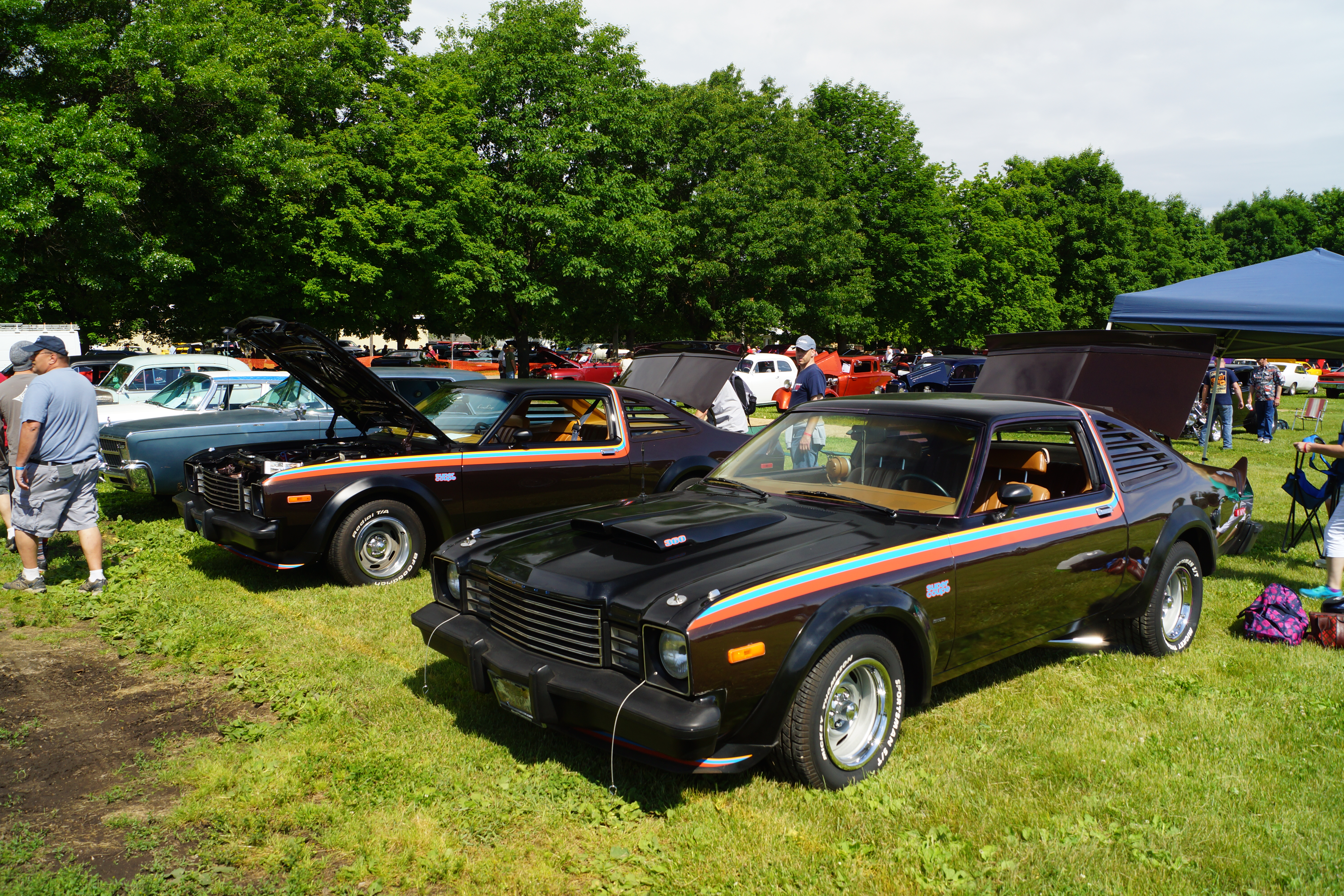
2 Dodge Aspen Super Coupes

The Volaré and Aspen Super Coupe packages (order code A67) included GR60x15 Goodyear GT radial tires on 15x8-inch wheels, Code "E58" 360CID 4bbl engine, x727HD transmission, heavy-duty suspension with a rear sway bar. The appearance was altered drastically from a standard Aspen/ Volare by adding Matte Black finishes on the entire hood, top of fenders, half the roof, both bumpers and misc. other trim. Along with that Blacked out look were full Matt Black wheel well flairs giving a widebody appearance along with a front spoiler attached to the front flairs. A 3-piece trunk tail spoiler was also included. Each were offered as a design package leaving no choice of paint colors. All Dodge Aspen versions were Sable Tan Sunfire Metallic (a rich Dark Brown) with orange, blue and yellow stripes to separate Body color from the Black. Volaré versions were all painted Crimson Sunfire Metallic (a Maroon/Red) with its own special three-color stripes in Yellow, Orange and Red separating the body color from the Black. Only 494 Volare and 531 Dodge Super Coupes were built.

Wider tail light lenses with amber turn signals replaced the previous all-red lenses on Volaré and Aspen coupes and sedans.

For the 1978 model year, sales were down over 30% from 1977; total production came to 166,419 (Aspen) and 217,795 (Volaré).

=== 1979 ===
The 1979 model year saw few changes. The only visible difference was the replacement of the amber rear turn signals with red ones. For the Volaré, a new coupe-only "Duster" trim package mirrored the Aspen "Sunrise" package, consisting primarily of rear strobe stripes, pinstripe and louvered rear windows, as well as plaid seating, different color options and a "Duster" badge on the Volaré. The 1978 option packages continued into 1979, with the exception of the super coupe and kit car options. A federally-mandated maximum 85 mph (137 km/h) speedometer, new colors, and a diagnostic connector for the engine were added. Station wagon models were available with a "sport package" (Volaré) or as a "sport wagon" (Aspen) with special stripes, a front air dam, and wheel arch flares.

Total 1979 production came to 178,819 (Volaré) and 121,354 (Aspen).

=== 1980 ===
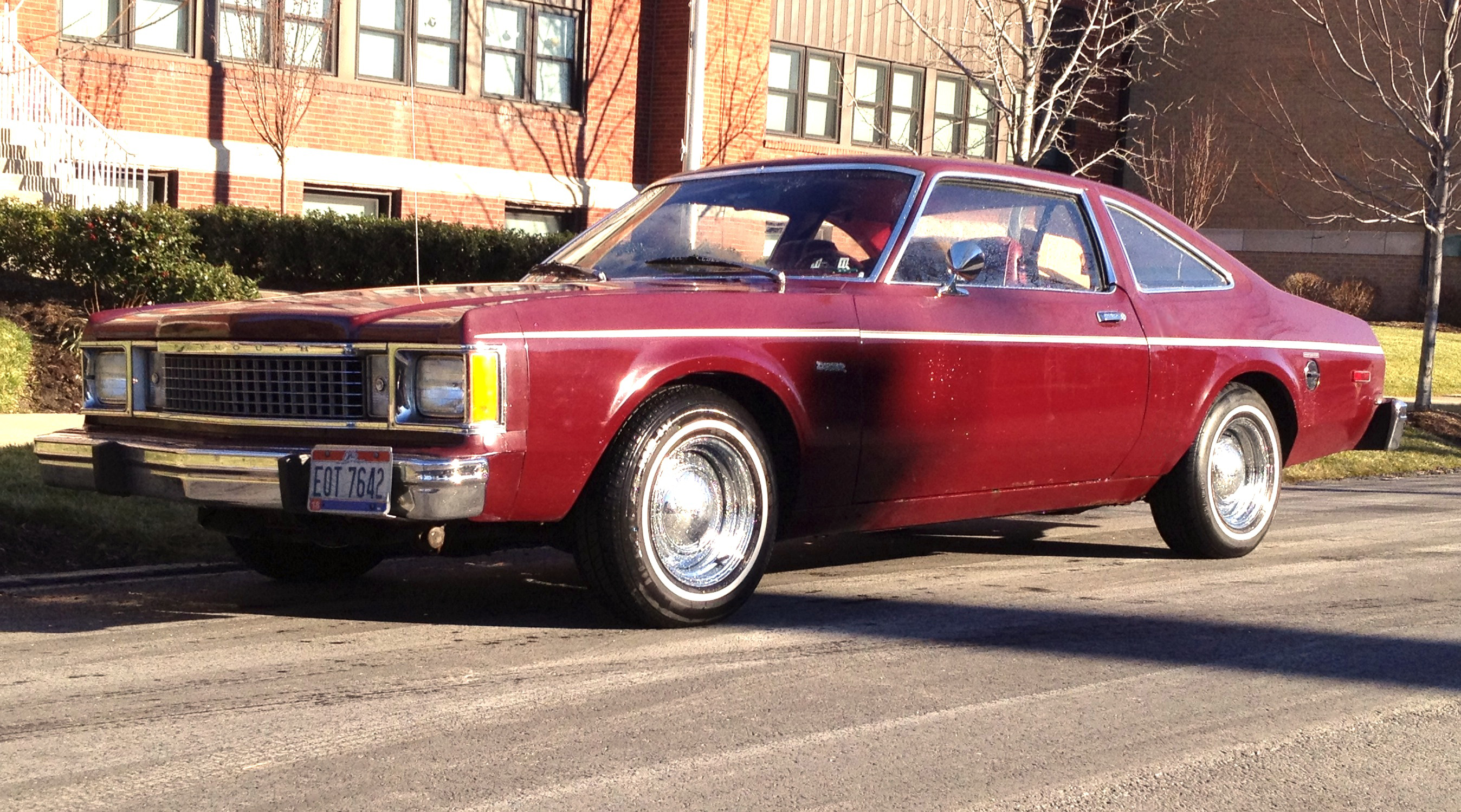
1980 Plymouth Volaré with the Duster trim package

For its final year of production, and at the insistence of Lee Iacocca, the Volaré and Aspen were restyled. They gained new front styling (very similar to the Ford Fairmont) with a thin grille and rectangular headlamps. This was achieved by sharing the hood, fenders, and front bumper with the Dodge Diplomat. Premier and SE packages were available, but now only available on the sedan and coupe. The Volaré Duster trim package was also available for the 1980 model year. The R/T package was installed on 285 Aspens for this year.

The 360 cu in (5.9 L) V8 was dropped for 1980, leaving the 318 cu in (5.2 L) V8 as the top engine choice. Power from the 318 V8 engine was reduced from 140 hp (104 kW; 142 PS) at 4,000 rpm to 120 hp (89 kW; 122 PS) at 3,600 rpm in two-barrel models. Four-barrel versions of the 318 V8 saw their output increase from 140 hp (104 kW; 142 PS) (non-California) at 4,000 rpm to 155 hp (116 kW; 157 PS) at 4,000 rpm. The 225 cu in (3.7 L) slant six engine remained the base engine offering. The Super Six two-barrel carburetor option was dropped, leaving only the single-barrel, Holley 1945 carburetor for the venerable slant six engine. In this configuration, the slant six produced 90 hp (67 kW; 91 PS) at 3,600 rpm.

Total production came to 67,318 (Aspen) and 90,063 (Volaré), though a significant portion of the sales were for fleet (police and taxi) use.

=== Volaré Road Runner / Aspen R/T ===
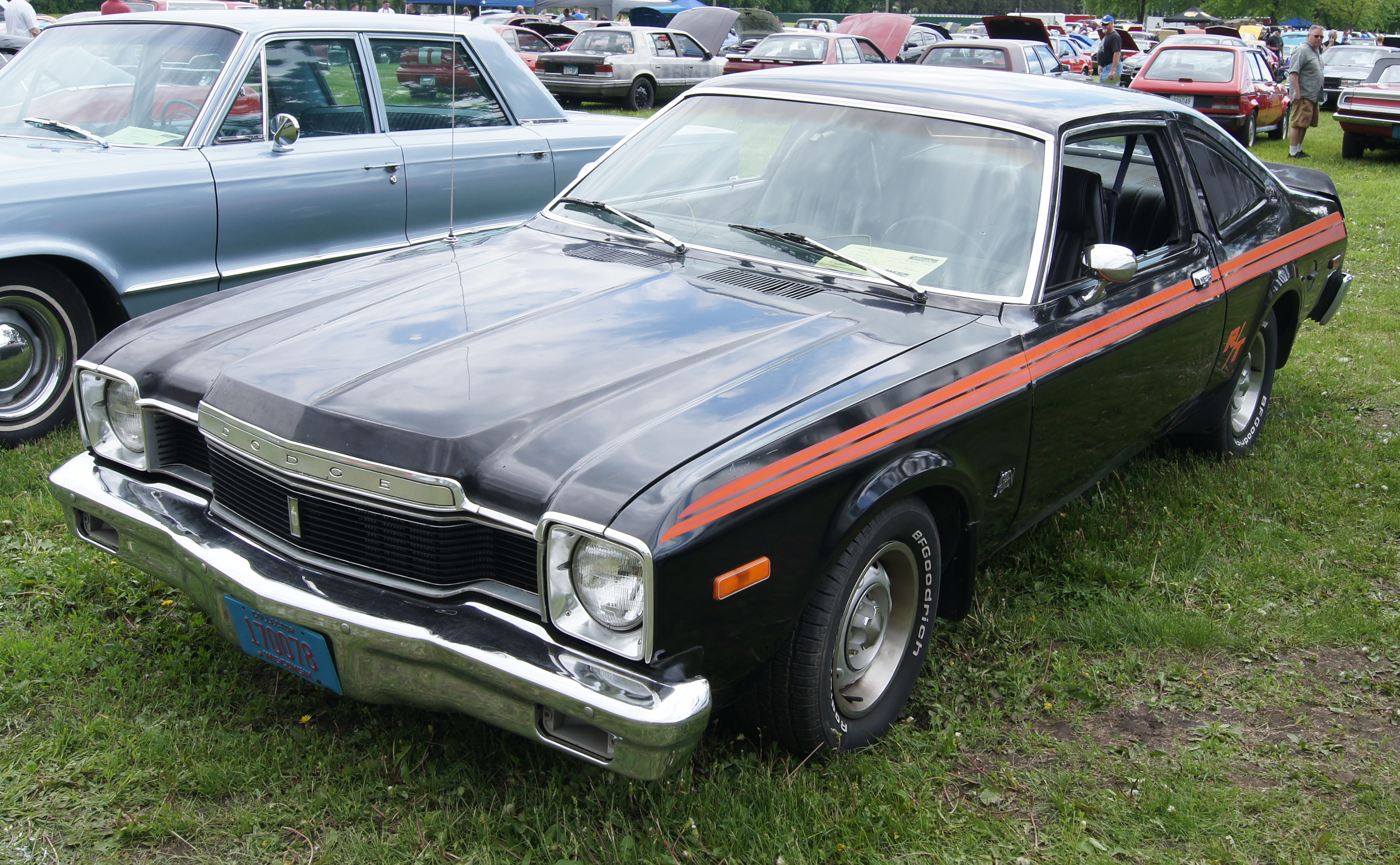
1976 Dodge Aspen R/T coupe

The Plymouth Volaré Road Runner and the Dodge Aspen R/T coupes were the "performance" trim levels of the Volaré/Aspen models. They came with E70x14 tires, "rallye" wheels, a grille blackout treatment, body striping, and identifying decals and medallions. A 360 cu in (5.9 L) V8 option, with a 170 hp (127 kW; 172 PS) and 280 lb⋅ft (380 N⋅m) of torque, was offered. (The 360 cu in (5.9 L) V8 option was unavailable in California because the engine, which averaged 15.2 mpg_{‑US} (15.5 L/100 km; 18.3 mpg_{‑imp}) did not meet California fuel economy regulations.) In a Motor Trend road test, a Dodge Aspen R/T equipped with this engine turned in a standing quarter mile at 17.4 seconds at a speed of 86.1 miles per hour (138.6 km/h). The R/T also made a 60 to 95 mph (97 to 153 km/h) run in 13.8 seconds. The 225 Slant 6 and both the 318 and 360 "LA" V8s were not available with the four-speed overdrive transmission, only Chrysler Corporation's Model 727 three-speed automatic transmissions were standard.

=== Station wagons ===
The Volaré/Aspen twins offered station wagon models that became the first domestic compact-sized competition for the AMC Hornet four-door "sportabout" wagon. The Volaré/Aspen wagons also featured a liftgate with a fixed rear window, rather than the more typical drop-down tailgate with roll-down rear window.

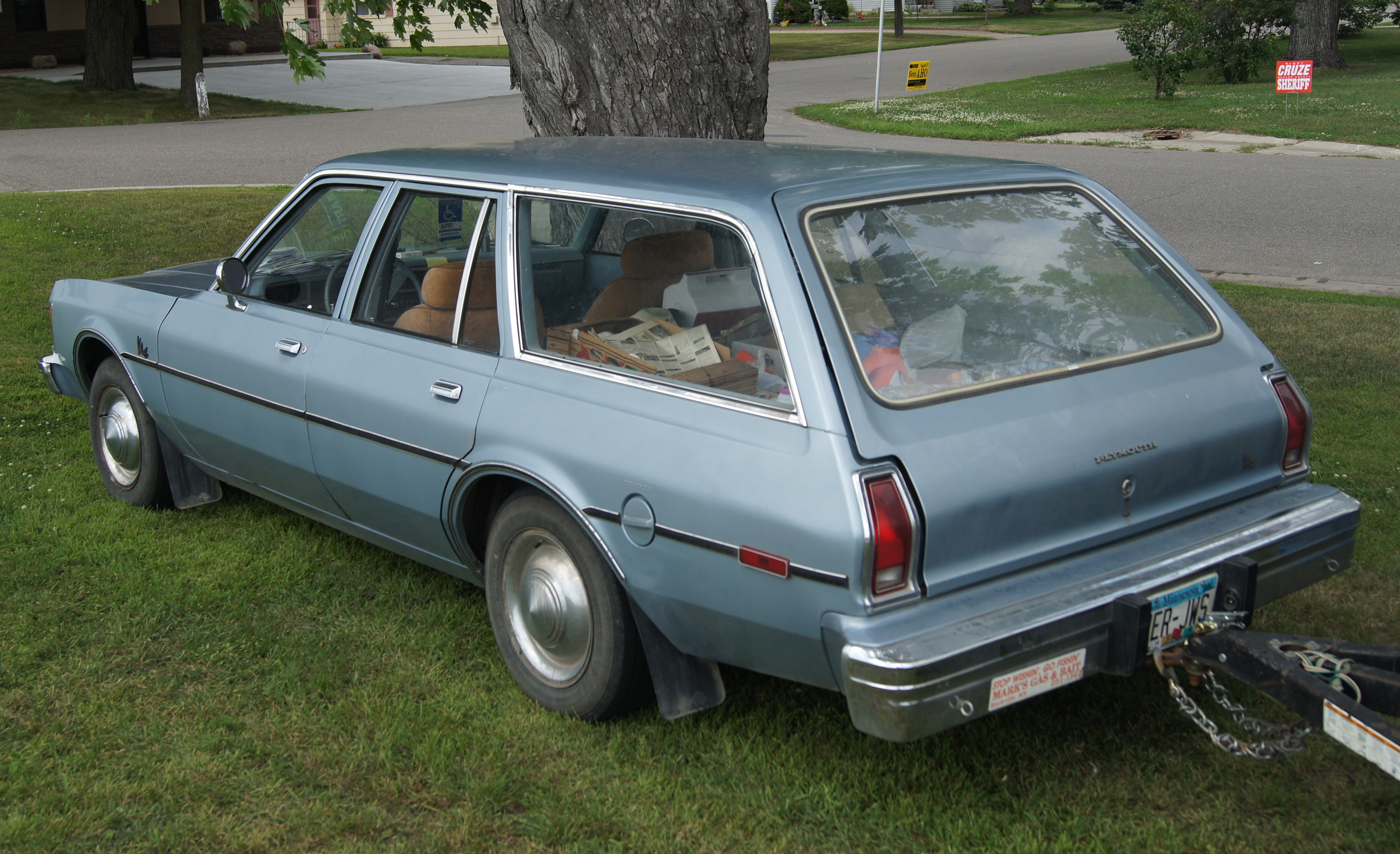
1980 Plymouth Volaré wagon

The new models had cargo volumes of 71.9 cubic feet (2.04 m^{3}) and load capacities of 1,100 lb (500 kg), which was only 100 lb (45 kg) less than the intermediate and standard size Chrysler wagons. The liftgate opening was nearly 4 ft (1.2 m) wide and 27.6 in (70 cm) high. With the rear seat folded down, the cargo area was 74 in (190 cm) long at the beltline and 43.2 in (110 cm) wide between the wheelhouses. Side covers of the cargo area were made of one-piece injection molded polypropylene. Covered, lockable stowage compartments of 1.5 ft^{3} (42 dm^{3}) capacity were provided in these panels; these compartments were standard on the Volaré Premier and the Aspen SE, and optional on the low-line wagons.

Top-trim Volaré Premier and Aspen SE station wagon models featured simulated woodgrain on its exterior side panels. Volaré Premier wagons trimmed the "woodgrain" side panels with stainless steel frames accented in matte black; Aspen SE models offered frames that were simulated blond (painted metal) wood-look trim. Aside from the brand badging and grilles unique on each brand, this station wagon trim element remains one of the few visual clues that differentiated the Volaré from the Aspen.

Production Figures:

(For 1979, the coupe and sedan production figures are listed together)

Dodge Aspen Production Figures
	Coupe	Sedan	Wagon	Yearly Total
1976	61,917	63,936	64,047	189,900
1977	66,675	87,815	111,522	266,012
1978	48,311	64,320	53,788	166,419
1979	88,268		33,086	121,354
1980	19,138	35,792	12,388	67,318
Total	*	*	274,831	811,003

=== End of Production ===
Production of the Aspen/Volaré ended at the beginning of 1980 with the final vehicle, a Silver Metallic 1980 Aspen equipped with the R/T package (the 285th and final one equipped with said package for this model year), rolling off Dodge Main Assembly on January 4. This was also the final car to be produced at the facility, which was closed the same day (its closure having been announced months prior in 1979). The car was purchased by Bob Nellis, an electrical contractor for Chrysler. It remained in the Nellis family ownership for 37 years before it was sold at the end of 2017.

After Dodge Main's closure, the site was purchased by General Motors in 1981, after which the factory was demolished to make way for the new Detroit/Hamtramck Assembly, opening in 1985.

== International markets ==
Between 1977 and 1979, the small Swiss specialty automaker Monteverdi built 20 modified versions of the Volaré/Aspen called the Sierra to compete in Europe's luxury car market.

The "Dart" name (rather than "Aspen") was applied to Dodge-branded F-platform cars in Mexico and Colombia, corresponding to the local Chrysler-branded F-platform cars badged as "Valiant Volarés". F-body Volaré models were not marketed under the "Plymouth" brand in Mexico because that brand was dropped after 1969.

During 1981 and 1982, Dart coupes built for the Mexican market used an M-platform Diplomat coupe that was fitted with a 1980 Volare header panel. Chrysler de México also sold less-expensive versions of the American K-cars: The Plymouth Reliant and Dodge Aries (in 1982–1987) and Plymouth Caravelle (1988) as "Chrysler Volarés".

The 1988 Chrysler Volaré E (an inexpensive version of the 1988 Plymouth Caravelle modified with a 1986–1988 Plymouth Reliant front end) served as Mexican Highway Patrol units from 1988 to 1990. They used Chrysler Turbo II 2.2 L engines and three-speed automatic transmissions (arm shifter on the steering columns, like U.S. patrol cars). In Mexico, they were known as "turbo-patrols".

The Volaré also became known as the "Volaré Duster" in Canada.

== Recalls and reputation ==
The Volaré/Aspen were recalled numerous times; for the 1976 model year, there were at least eight serious recalls alone.

They included:

- Potential failure of a component in the front suspension, which could cause the suspension to detach from the front subframe under hard braking;
- Possibility that the secondary hood latch could not properly hold the hood closed;
- Front brake lines, routed underneath the battery, that could corrode from spilled battery acid and lead to brake failure;
- Seat belts that could unlatch during hard deceleration (such as an accident or hard braking), thereby preventing them from protecting the occupant;
- Misrouted fuel vapor line that could rub against the alternator drive belt, possibly resulting in a fire;
- Replacement of front fenders that corroded prematurely (sometimes in less than a year) because of an ill-advised cost-saving decision not to install front inner fender shields;
- At least one recall to address chronic stalling and drivability problems.

Chronic problems with stalling and poor drivability led to a horrible reputation that the Volaré/Aspen quickly gained as new buyers were to discover for themselves; premature rusting problems soon followed. In 1977, 1,300,000 Chrysler Corporation models were recalled for these drivability problems.

It is possible that much of the product-defect difficulty with the Volaré/Aspen models could have been avoided if Chrysler Corporation had taken more time to fully develop the cars before offering them to the market, but in an effort to boost sales and get a badly needed infusion of cash, Chrysler Corporation launched the Volaré/Aspen models as quickly as possible. This reputation for poor-build quality led to a decline in sales as the Volaré/Aspen twins became the most-recalled automobile models to that date. Winners of the Motor Trend Car of the Year, the Aspen and Volaré later received the Lemon of the Year award from the Center for Auto Safety, the consumer watchdog group founded by Ralph Nader.

== Replacements for the Volaré/Aspen ==
In 1980, the Volaré/Aspen cars were replaced with the front-wheel drive Plymouth Reliant and Dodge Aries for the 1981 model year.

However, a new class of the F-platform emerged as the M-Body vehicles that included the Dodge Diplomat and Plymouth Gran Fury four-door sedans, which were very similar in structure, size, and engineering with the Aspen and Volaré.

The Aspen model name was revived in 2007 for the Chrysler Aspen luxury sport utility vehicle (SUV).
