= Monteverdi Sierra =

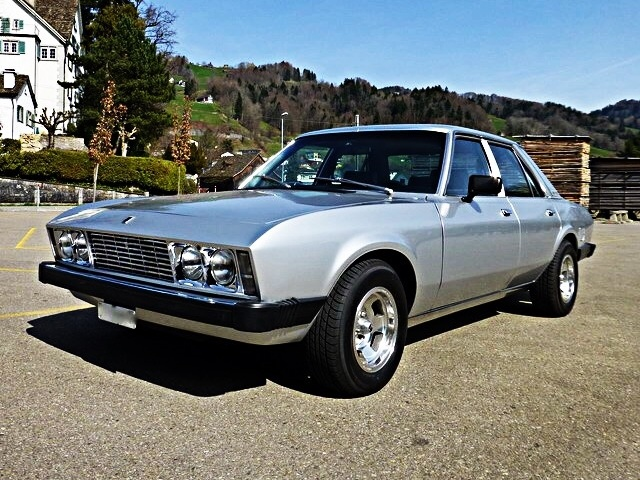
- Monteverdi Sierra sedan

Overview
- Manufacturer: Monteverdi
- Production: 1977–1980; 20 built
- Assembly: Switzerland: Basel
- Designer: Carrozzeria Fissore

Body and chassis
- Class: Mid-size luxury car (E)
- Body style: 4-door saloon 4-door estate (1977 only); 2-door convertible (2 built)
- Layout: FR layout
- Platform: F-body; M-body (convertible)
- Related: Plymouth Volare; Dodge Aspen; Dodge Diplomat (convertible)

Powertrain
- Engine: 318 cu in (5.2 L) LA V8
- Transmission: A904 3-speed TorqueFlite automatic

The Monteverdi Sierra is a Swiss luxury car produced by Monteverdi based on the underpinnings of the Dodge Aspen and Plymouth Volaré. From 1977 to 1980, around 20 cars were built.

== History ==
The Sierras were essentially reskinned Dodge Aspens and Plymouth Volarés, although the two convertible versions were based on the Dodge Diplomat. The coachwork was done by the Italian coachbuilding firm Carrozzeria Fissore, where they were given new front and rear styling, custom Italian leather interiors, custom gauge clusters, and a custom console. The new styling included Fiat 124 Special headlight assemblies, Fiat 125 indicator clusters, Renault 12 taillights and Wolf Race mag wheels.

The suspension was changed from the Chrysler torsion bar design to independent, upper wishbones and lower horizontal arms combined with trailing radius rods, coil springs, adjustable shock absorbers, and stabilizer bar. The only powertrain option was a 175 hp (130 kW) Chrysler 318 cubic inch Small Block V8 paired to a Chrysler TorqueFlite A-904 3-speed automatic transmission.

== Production ==
- Approximately 15 sedans
- 2 convertibles (1 red and 1 silver)
- 5 station wagons

== Gallery ==
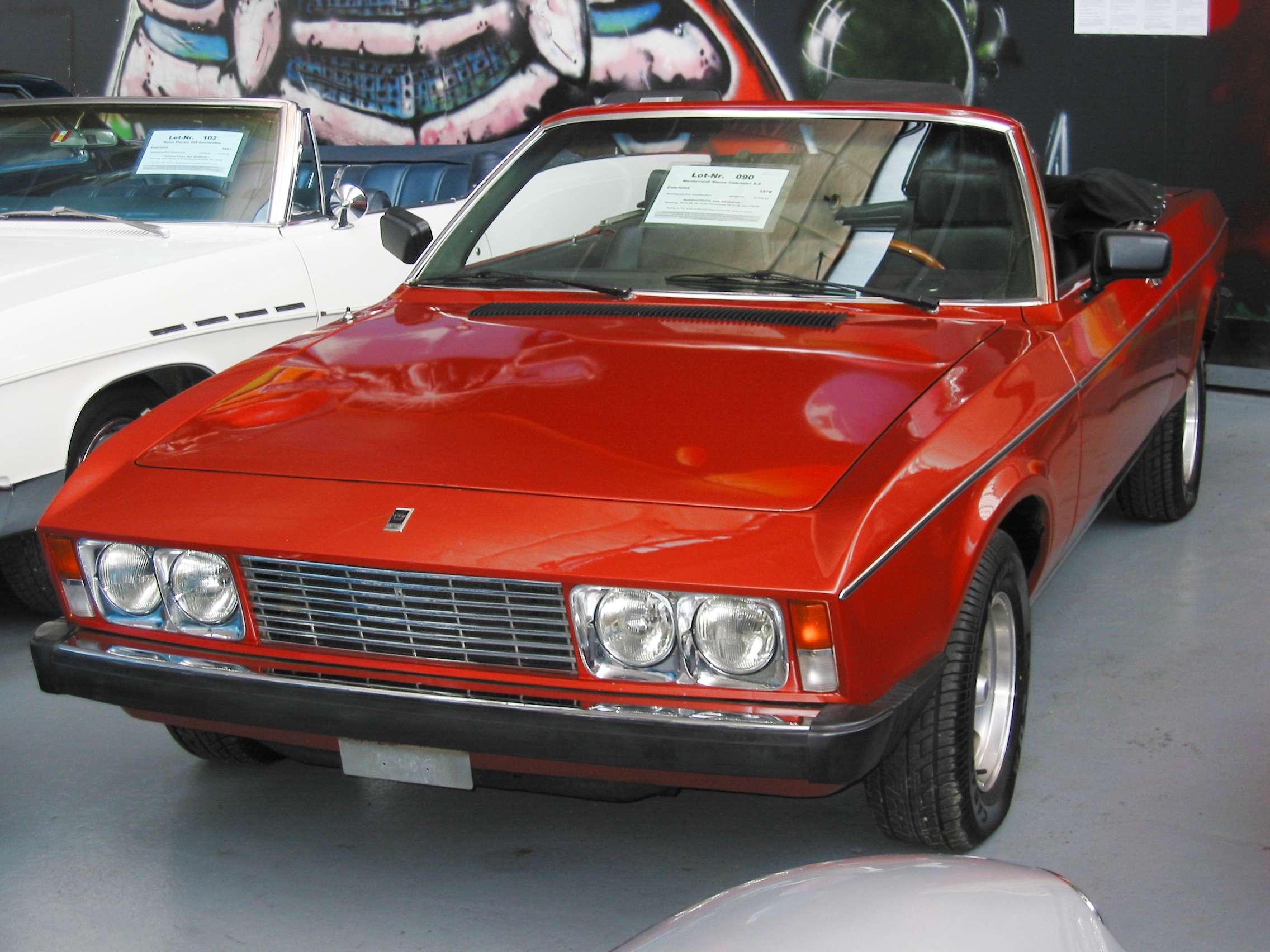
Monteverdi Sierra convertible, one of two prototypes built

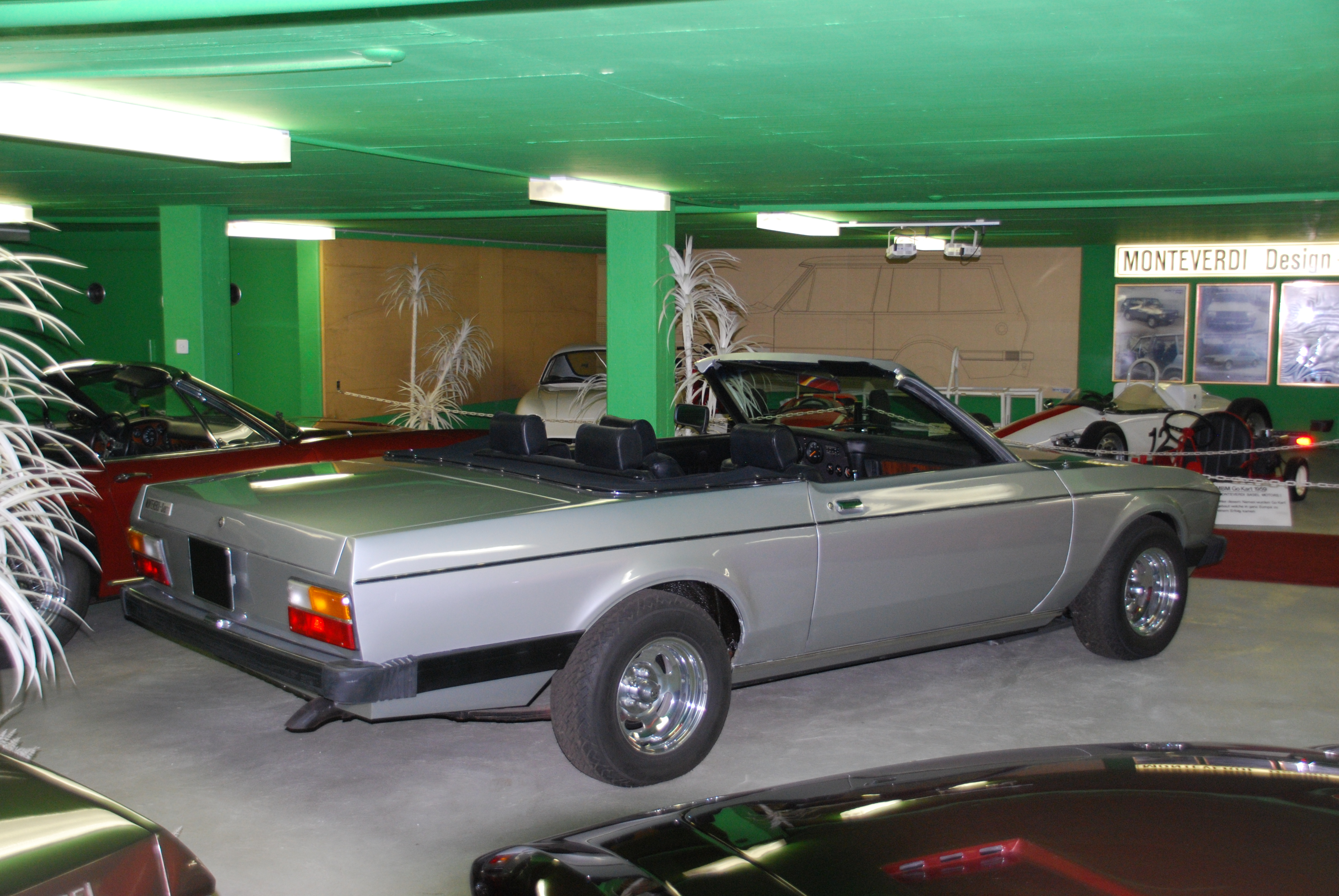
Monteverdi Sierra convertible (rear)

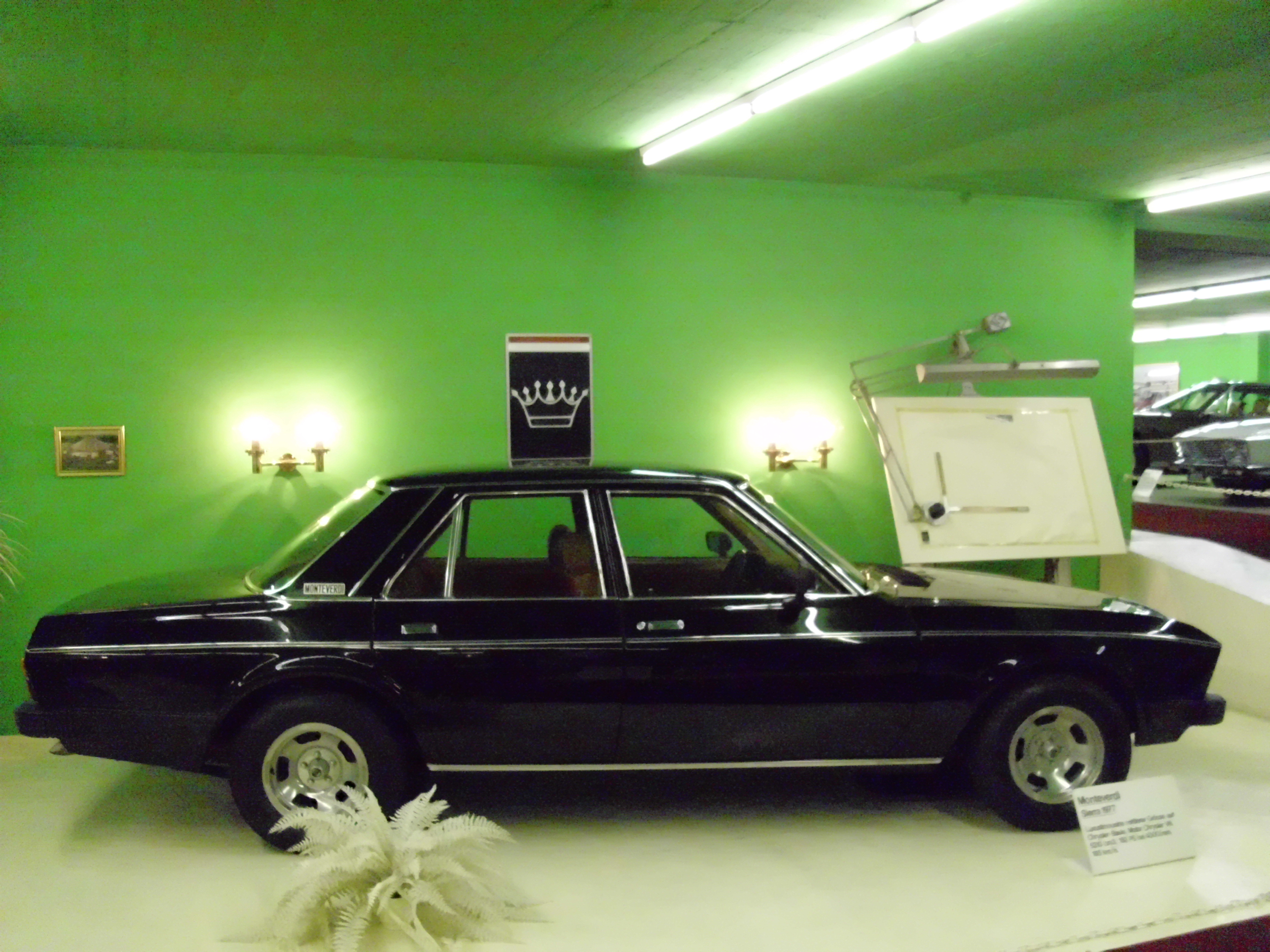
1977 Monteverdi Sierra sedan

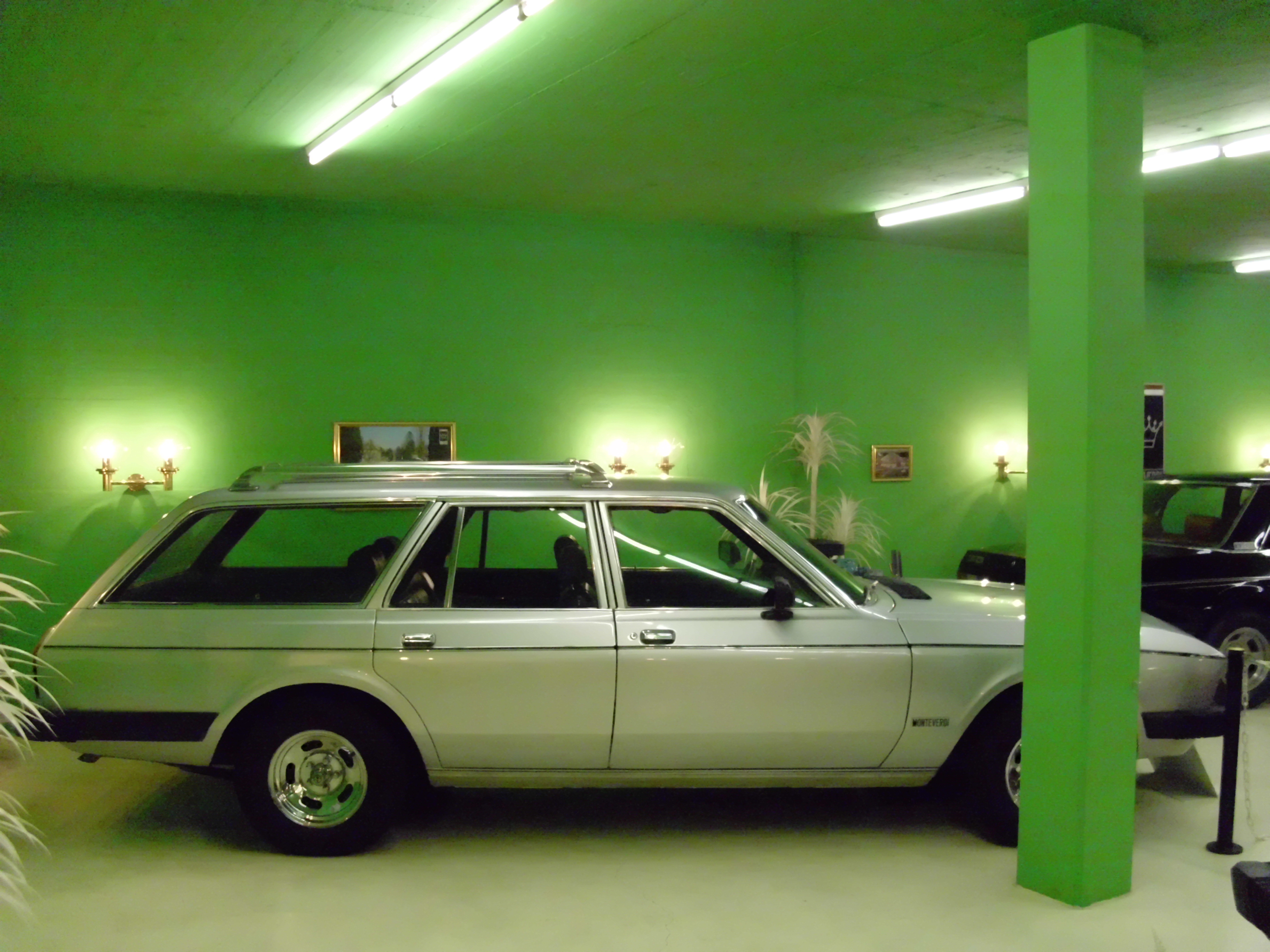
Monteverdi Sierra wagon

Monteverdi Sierra interior
