= Chrysler M platform =

- 1985 Plymouth Gran Fury

Overview
- Manufacturer: Chrysler Corporation
- Production: 1977–1989

Body and chassis
- Class: Mid-size
- Layout: FR layout
- Body styles: 2-door coupe 4-door sedan 4-door station wagon

Powertrain
- Engines: 3.7 L Slant 6 I6; 5.2 L LA V8; 5.9 L LA V8
- Transmissions: 4-speed A833 manual 3-speed A727 automatic 3-speed A904 automatic 3-speed A999 automatic

Dimensions
- Wheelbase: 108.7 in (2,761 mm) (2-door models only, 1980-82); 112.7 in (2,863 mm)

Chronology
- Predecessor: F-body; R-body
- Successor: K platform

The Chrysler M platform (or "M-body") was an intermediate-sized automobile platform produced by Chrysler Corporation from 1977 to 1989. It was a successor to the F-body, as used on the Dodge Aspen/ Plymouth Volare. The M-body was also the successor to the short-lived R-body, as the Chrysler New Yorker and Plymouth Gran Fury moved to it following the R-body's demise in 1981. The M platform was the final production passenger car with a solid rear axle mounted on Hotchkiss-style, parallel semi-elliptical leaf springs sold in the U.S.

The M-cars were built at St. Louis, Missouri, and Newark, Delaware, with initial debut (LeBaron/Diplomat series) in spring 1977 as 1977 1/2 models, with production shifting to Windsor, Ontario through 1983, then moving to Fenton, Missouri. Beginning in February 1987 and ending with 1989 model year, the American Motors Main plant in Kenosha, Wisconsin, was utilized for assembly.

By 1983–84, it became clear that most private buyers preferred the equally roomy but cheaper and more fuel-efficient K-cars; however, the M's long-proven traditional engineering, handling, and V8 engine availability appealed to police and taxi fleets, allowing the car's continued existence until the end of the decade. In mid-1988, the Chrysler M-bodies received a driver side air bag. After the M-bodies were discontinued in mid-1989, Chrysler Corporation did not build a rear wheel drive car again (outside of trucks and specialty models) until the 2005 LX-based cars.

Vehicles on this platform include:

- 1977–1989 Dodge Diplomat
- 1977–1981 Chrysler LeBaron
- 1978–1981 Chrysler Town & Country station wagon
- 1978–1979 Dodge Coronet (South America)
- 1978–1982 Plymouth Caravelle (Canada)
- 1980–1981 Dodge Dart (Mexico)
- 1981–1982 Dodge Magnum 5.9L (Mexico)
- 1982–1989 Plymouth Gran Fury
- 1982 Chrysler New Yorker
- 1983 Chrysler New Yorker Fifth Avenue
- 1983–1989 Plymouth Caravelle Salon (Canada)
- 1984–1989 Chrysler Fifth Avenue
- 1979–1980 Monteverdi Sierra Convertible

Three body styles offered:

- 2-door coupe – 1977–1981
- 4-door sedan – 1977–1989
- 4-door station wagon – 1978–1981

Two wheelbases used:

- 108.7 in – 1980–1981 2-door
- 112.7 in – 1977–1979 2-door, 1978–1981 Station Wagon and 1977–1989 4-door

Engines used with this platform include:

- 225 Slant 6 (1977–1983)
- 318 V8 (1977–1989)
- 360 V8 (1977–1979)
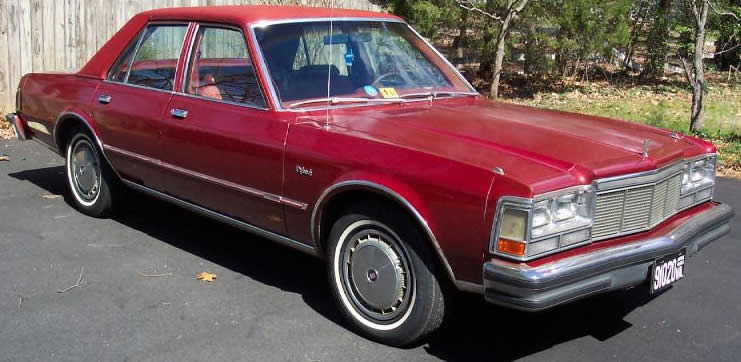
1977 Dodge Diplomat sedan

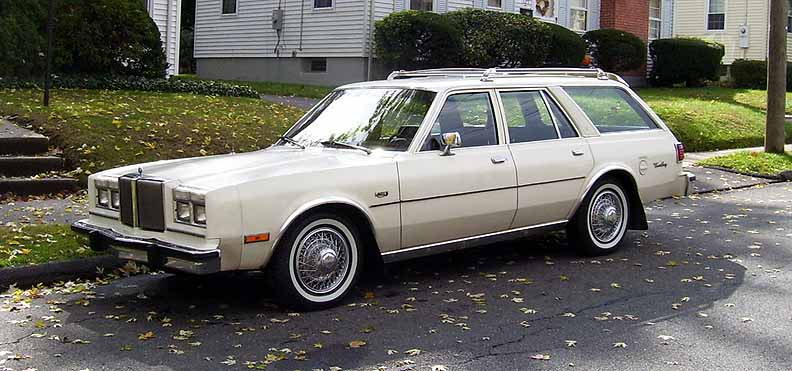
1980 Chrysler Town and Country station wagon

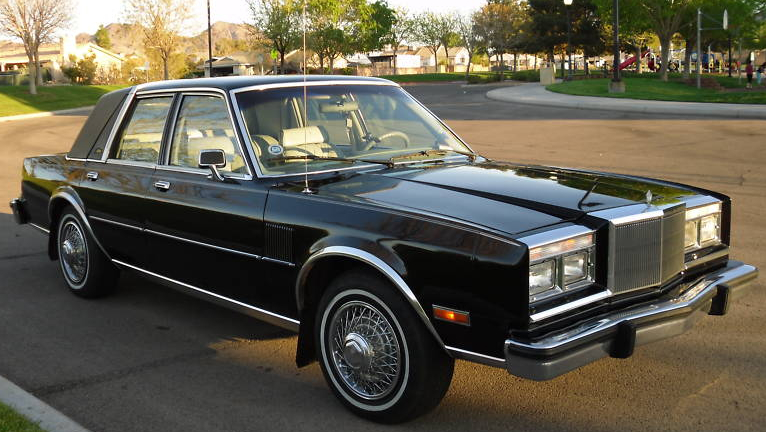
1984 Chrysler Fifth Avenue sedan

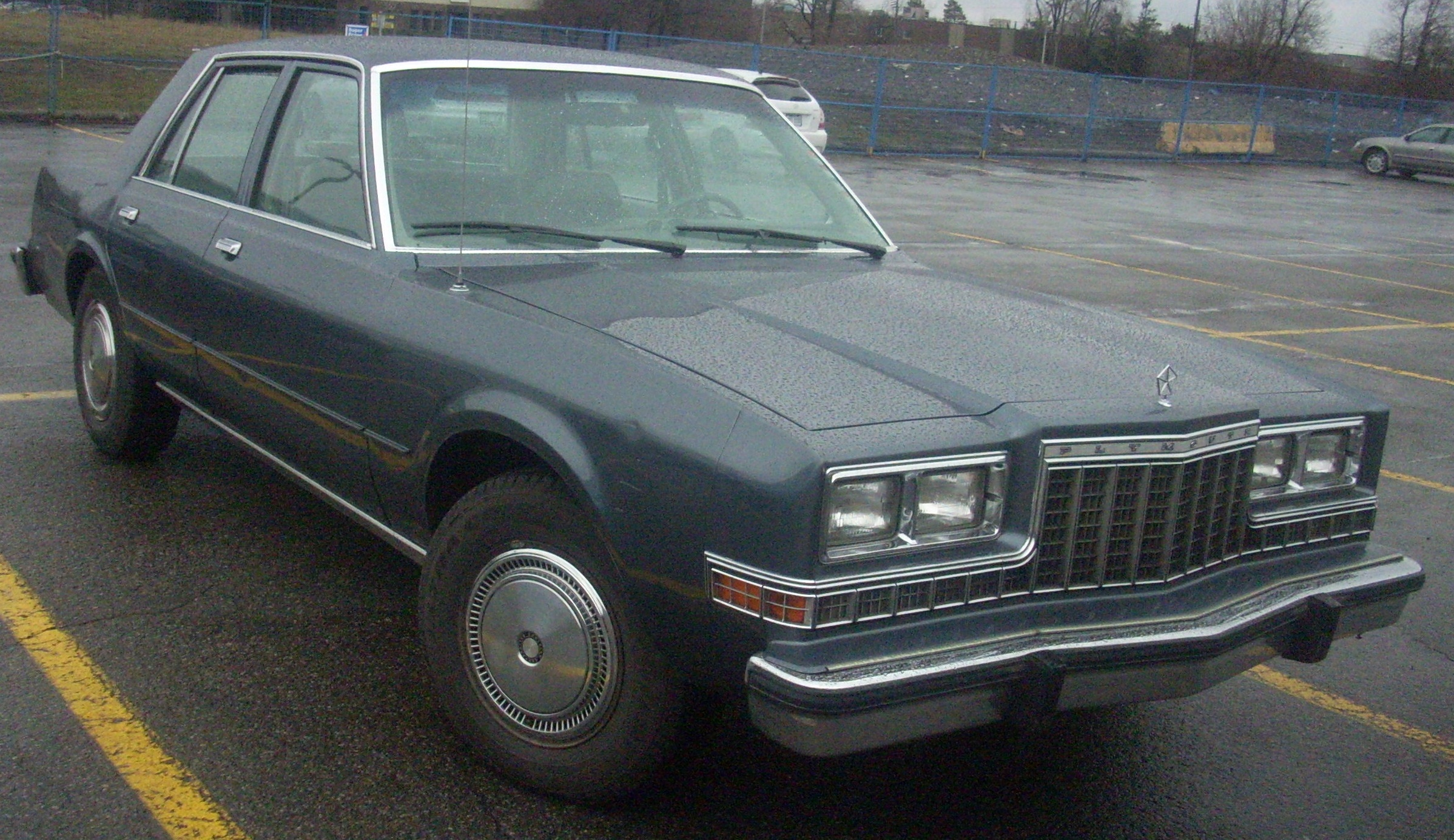
1986 Plymouth Caravelle Salon sedan

== See also ==
- List of Chrysler platforms
