= Chrysler F platform =

Rear wheel drive automobile platform

The Chrysler F platform was a rear wheel drive automobile platform used by Chrysler motors from 1976 to 1980. It was replaced by the nearly identical M platform. There were two wheelbases: 108.7 in for 2-door models, and 112.7 in for four-doors. As the market evolved, these would be marketed as mid-size and eventually take on full-sized nameplates such as Plymouth Fury for police and fleet applications. These were effectively replaced by the very successful Chrysler K platform in standard and stretch sizes which retained two bench seats, column shifter and room for six, unlike many other compact-sized cars modeled after non-American designs.

Cars that used the F platform include:

- 1976–1980 Dodge Aspen/Plymouth Volaré
- 1979–1980 Plymouth Duster
- 1976–1980 Plymouth Road Runner
- 1976–1980 Dodge Dart (Mexico)
- 1976–1980 Dodge Super Bee (Mexico)
- 1976–1980 Chrysler Valiant/Valiant Volare
- 1977–1980 Monteverdi Sierra

== See also ==
- Chrysler platforms
