= Chrysler New Yorker =

American automobile model (1940–1996)

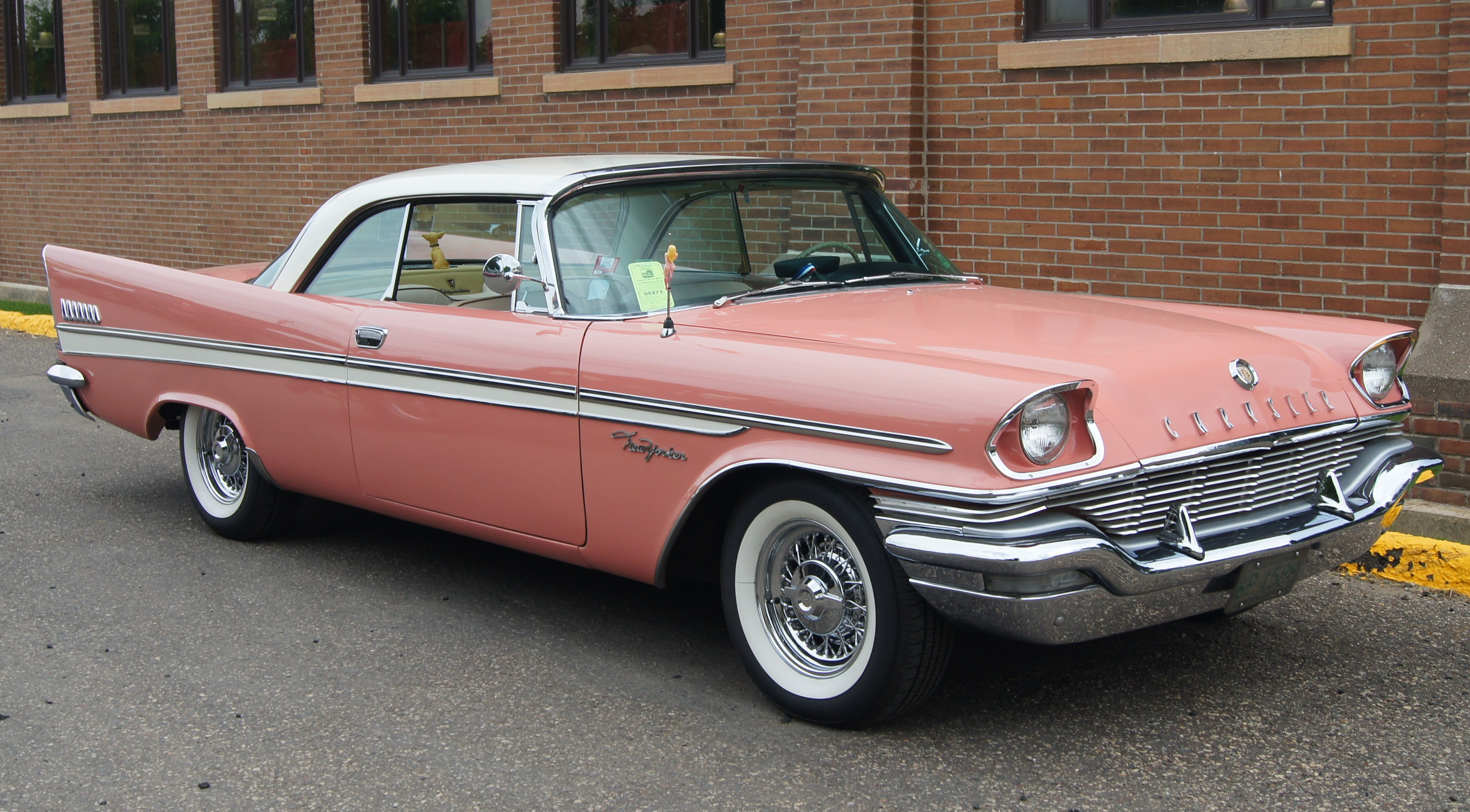
- 1957 New Yorker

Overview
- Manufacturer: Chrysler Corporation
- Model years: 1940–1942; 1946–1996

Body and chassis
- Class: Full-size (1940–1981, 1994–1996); Mid-size (1983–1993)
- Layout: FR layout (1940–1982); FF layout (1983–1996)

Chronology
- Successor: Chrysler LHS

The Chrysler New Yorker is an automobile model produced by Chrysler from 1940 until 1996. For several decades, it served as either the brand's flagship model or as a junior sedan to the Chrysler Imperial, the latter during the years in which the Imperial name was used within the Chrysler lineup rather than a standalone brand.

A trim level named the "New York Special" first appeared in 1938, while the "New Yorker" name debuted in 1939. The New Yorker helped define the Chrysler brand as a maker of upscale models that were priced and equipped to compete against upper-level models from Buick, Oldsmobile, and Mercury. The New Yorker was Chrysler's most prestigious model throughout most of its run. Over the decades, it was available in several body styles, including sedan, coupe, convertible, and wagon.

Until its discontinuation in 1996, the New Yorker was the longest-running American car nameplate.

== 1938–1942 ==
Series C-19 / C-23 / C-26 / C-30 / C-36
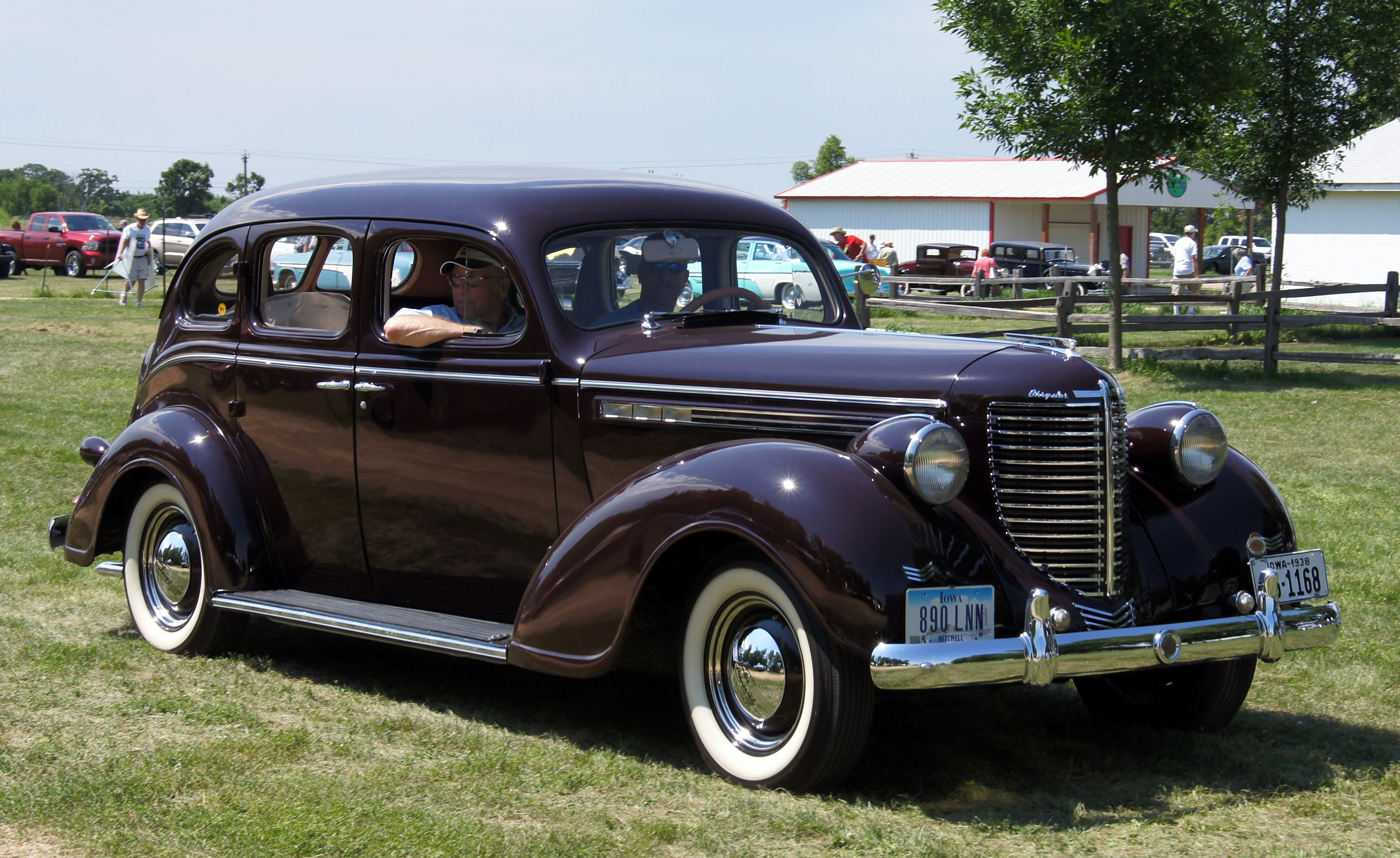
- 1938 New York Special

Overview
- Model years: 1940–1942 (from 1938 as a version of the Imperial)
- Assembly: United States: Detroit, Michigan (Jefferson Avenue Assembly)

Body and chassis
- Body style: 2/4-door sedan 2-door coupe 2-door convertible
- Layout: FR layout
- Related: Chrysler Imperial; Chrysler Saratoga; Chrysler Royal; Chrysler Thunderbolt

Powertrain
- Engine: 298.7 cu in (4.9 L) Chrysler Straight Eight; 323.5 cu in (5.3 L) Chrysler Straight Eight
- Transmission: 3-speed manual w/Cruise and Climb overdrive

Dimensions
- Wheelbase: 125 in (3,175 mm) (1938–1939); 128.5 in (3,264 mm) (1940); 127.5 in (3,238 mm) (1941–1942)

The New York Special Series C19 was introduced as a distinct sub-series of the 1938 Chrysler Imperial. It was available as a four-door sedan with a 298.7 cu in (4.9 L) straight-eight engine and a generous amount of comfort and space for the passengers, and a two-door Business Coupe - though no records show one was ordered and built. Unique broadcloth upholstery was specific to the New York Special, offering two single-color exterior paint or four two-tone color combinations. Instrument panels were highly polished woodgrain finish and were harmonized with the upholstery colors. For 1939, it was expanded with two more coupe versions and a two-door sedan, as well as a larger, more powerful engine from Imperial, and it took on the "New Yorker" name, dropping the "Special" tag. Prices ranged from US$1,223 ($28,307 in 2025 dollars) for the two-passenger two-door coupe to US$1,298 ($30,043 in 2025 dollars) for the four-door sedan.

The first convertibles were introduced with the new body design of the 1940 models. The C26 series was the first New Yorker to be considered a standalone model rather than an Imperial version. It also saw the introduction of Fluid Drive, a fluid coupling between the engine and the clutch. It featured an independent front coil suspension and a beam axle in the rear. The only transmission available was the basic three-speed manual. The "New Yorker Highlander" included tartan seats and other interior elements, and the same interior treatment was on the Windsor Highlander, but an I6 engine powered it. Interior color choices were blue, green, brown and maroon for the cloth upholstery, while the headliner, interior rear quarter panels, and door panels were trimmed in a lighter, contrasting shade of upholstery color.

Lightly redesigned bodies were introduced for 1941, with the business coupe now being a three-window design. The bodies were all marginally wider and lower, with increased glass surfaces. Another new model was the Town Sedan, with the rear doors hinged at the forward edge of the doors. This year, the Vacamatic was made available. However, unlike the version sold on six-cylinder models, the Saratoga/New Yorker version was a three-speed transmission with overdrive called "Cruise and Climb".

With America entering World War II on December 11, 1941, all automobile production ended at the beginning of February 1942. Thus, the 1942 model year was roughly half the usual length. Cars built after December 1941 had blackout trim. The 1942 Chryslers were relatively modern, with a design that heralded the post-war ponton style and fenders more incorporated into the bodywork. The grille consisted of five horizontal chrome bars wrapped around the front, reaching to the leading edge of the front wheelwell. A total of 12,145 New Yorkers of the C36 series were built this year. Chrysler would produce and experiment with engines for tanks and aircraft during World War II.

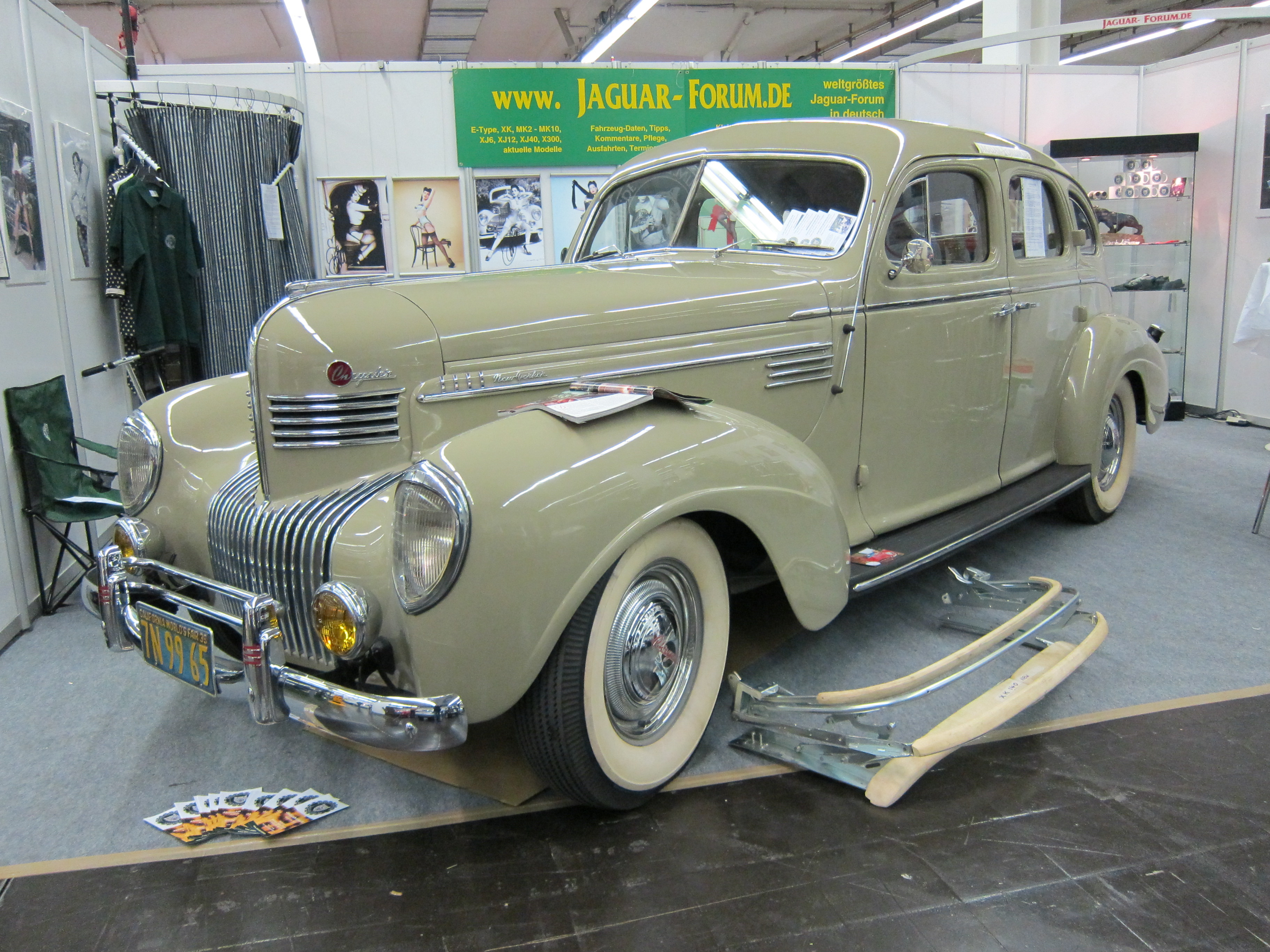
1939 New Yorker 4-door sedan

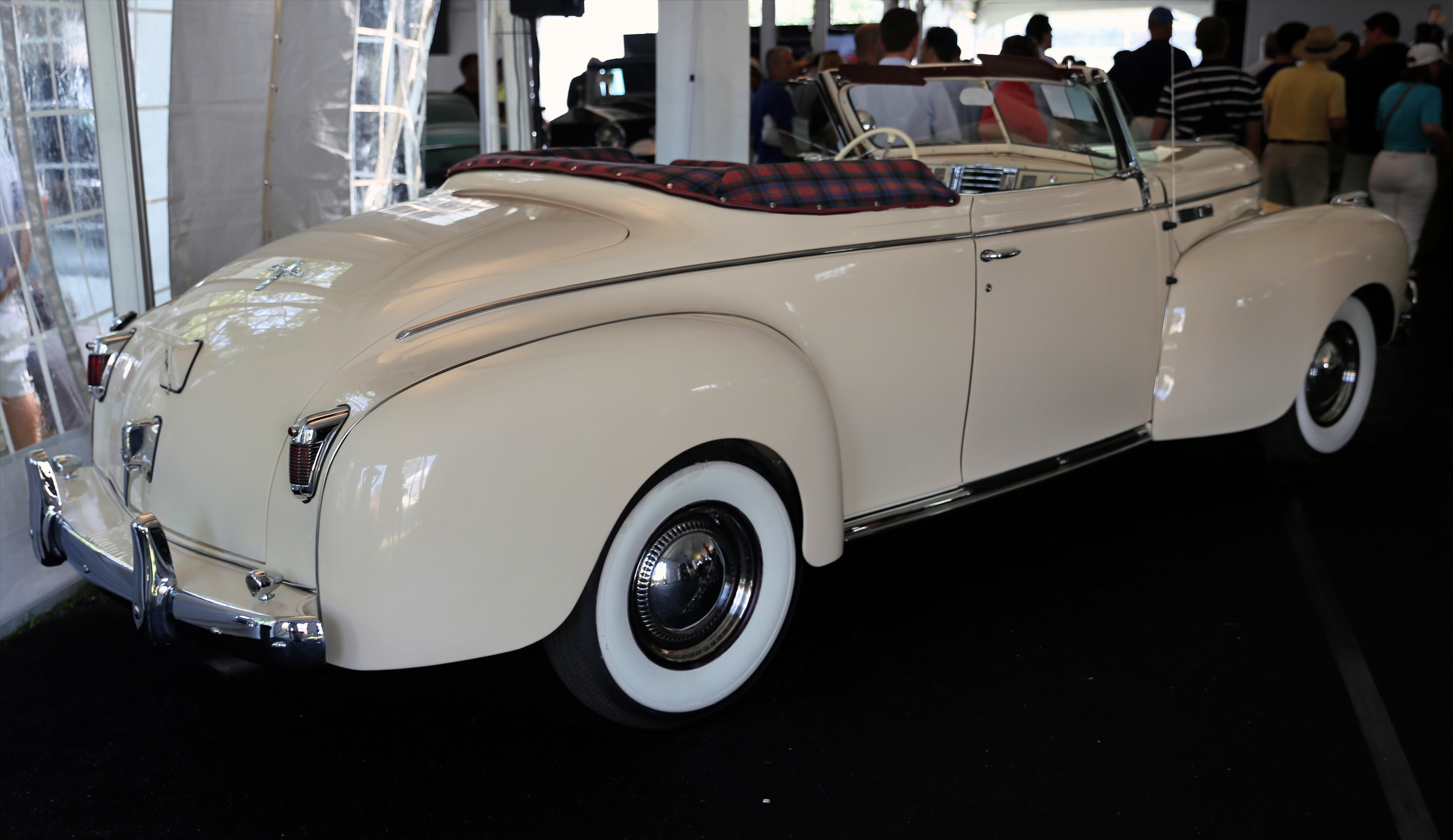
1940 New Yorker Highlander convertible coupe

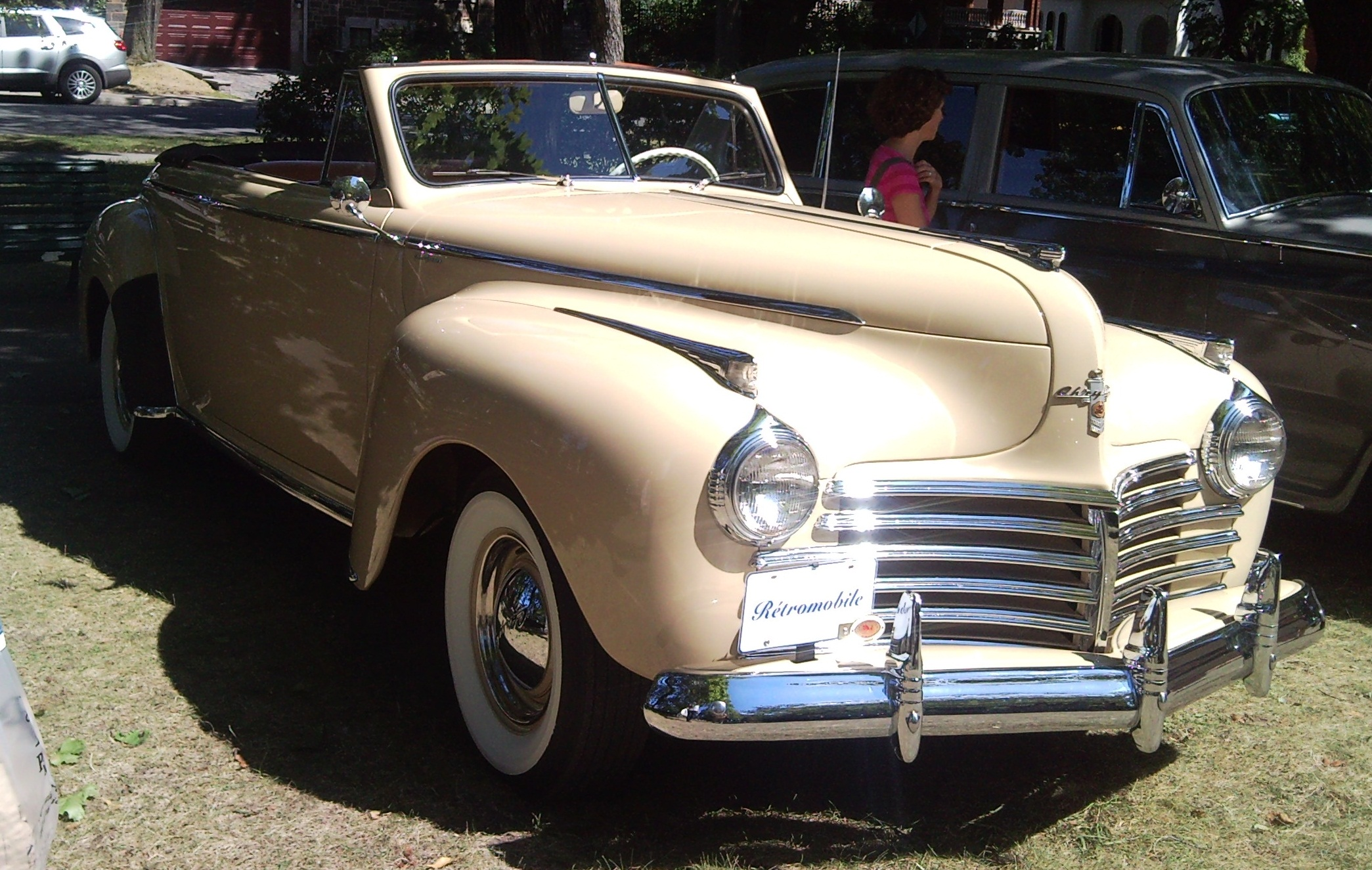
1941 New Yorker convertible coupé

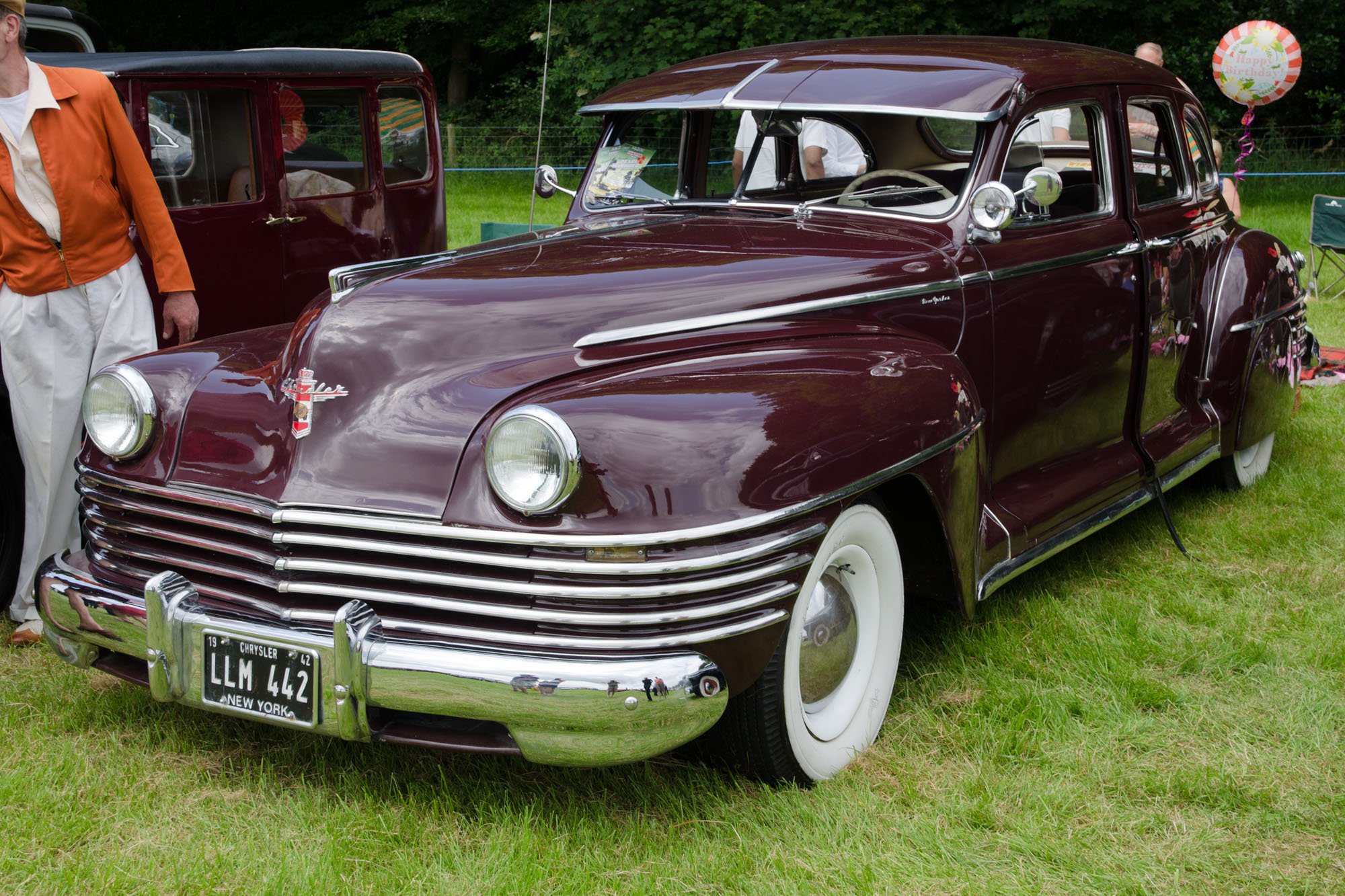
1942 New Yorker 4-door sedan

== 1946–1948 ==
Series C-39
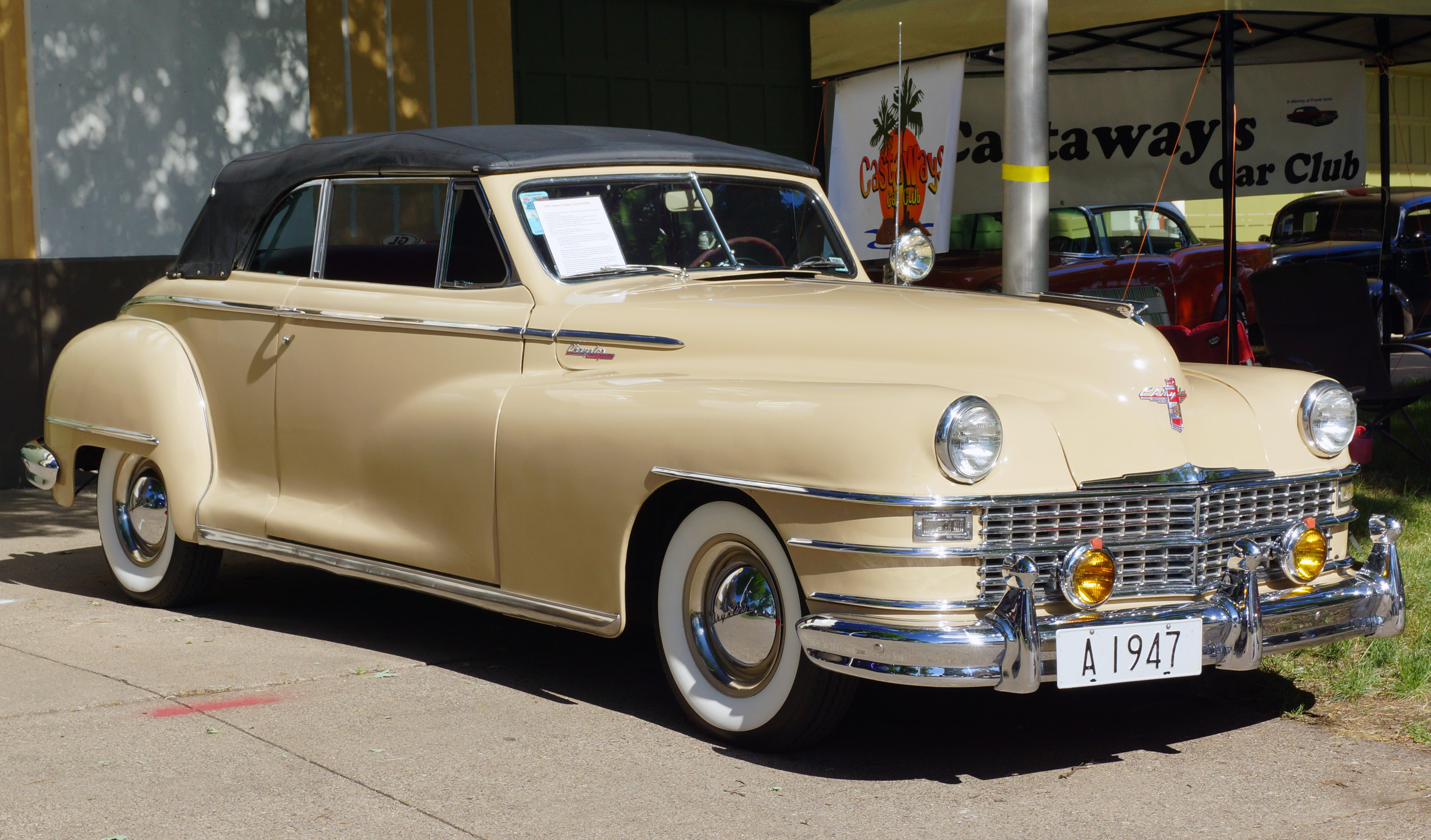
- 1947 New Yorker Highlander convertible

Overview
- Model years: 1946–1948
- Assembly: United States: Detroit, Michigan (Jefferson Avenue Assembly: 1948); United States: Los Angeles, California (Maywood Assembly)

Body and chassis
- Body style: 4-door sedan 2-door brougham sedan 2-door coupe 2-door convertible
- Layout: FR layout
- Related: Chrysler Imperial; Chrysler Saratoga; Chrysler Newport Phaeton; Chrysler Windsor; Chrysler Royal; DeSoto Custom

Powertrain
- Engine: 323.5 cu in (5.3 L) Chrysler Straight Eight
- Transmission: 3-speed manual w/optional Fluid Drive; Presto-Matic 4-speed semi-automatic

Dimensions
- Wheelbase: 127.5 in (3,238 mm)
- Length: 214.3 in (5,443 mm)
- Width: 77.8 in (1,976 mm)

When production resumed after World War II in 1946, the New Yorker became Chrysler's top luxury trim package, while the Imperial Crown offered New Yorker levels of luxury with an extended 145 in (3,683 mm) wheelbase. Unlike most car companies, Chrysler did not make significant changes with each model year from 1946 through 1948. As a result, Chryslers had the same basic appearance during this period, characterized by their die-cast "harmonica" grille and based on the body introduced with the 1941 models. 1947 saw a minor redesign in tires, trim, and instrument panel, while the first 1948s were just 1947s with no visible changes. Post-war Chryslers continued to offer Fluid Drive, with the New Yorker now offering the Presto-Matic four-speed semi-automatic transmission.

Chrysler offered the New Yorker as the luxury car to compete with the Cadillac Series 61, Buick Roadmaster, and Packard Super Clipper, listing the four-door sedan at US$2,073 ($29,890 in 2025 dollars) before optional equipment. The Chrysler Saratoga featured the larger eight-cylinder engine, but with a lower trim level and interior features. Six-cylinder engines with higher grade interior and appearance were offered as Chrysler Royal short wheelbase or the longer-wheelbase Chrysler Windsor. The Chrysler Town & Country models included exterior wood body panels until the line consisted exclusively of the station wagon.

The two-door sedan was available in three variations, and the body styles were shared with DeSoto, Dodge, and Plymouth branded models. The styles were a three-passenger Coupe, a six-passenger Club Coupe with a sloping rear roof, and a six-passenger brougham sedan with a formal rear roof appearance.

New Yorkers produced between December 3, 1948 and January 11, 1949 were marketed as 1949 "First Series" models. This was due to production issues which resulted in the restyled 1949 models not being ready for release.

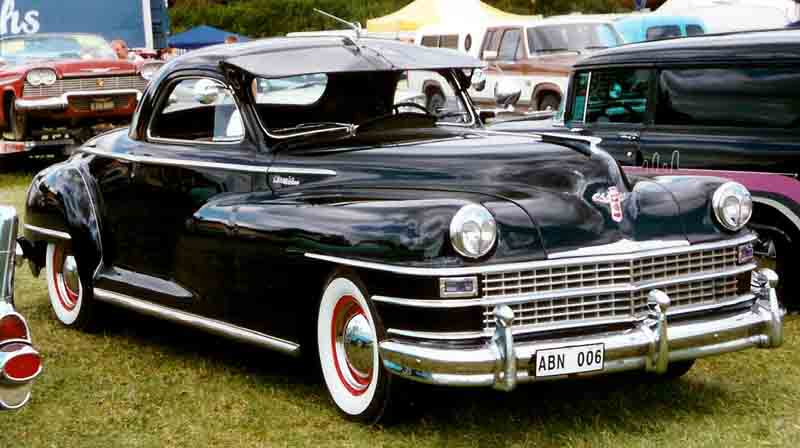
1947 New Yorker coupe

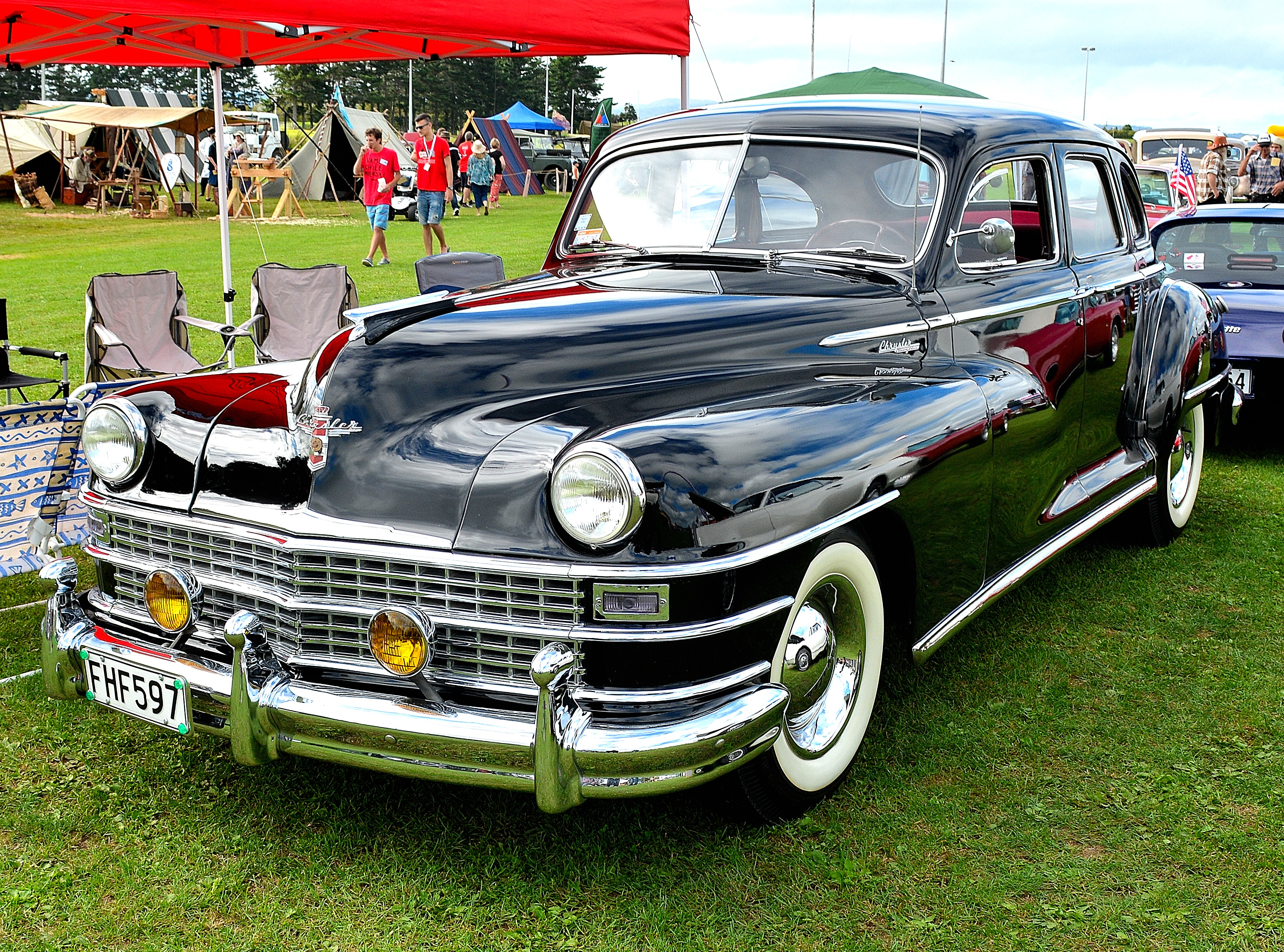
1948 New Yorker 4-door sedan

== 1949–1954 ==
Series C46N / C52 / C56 / C63
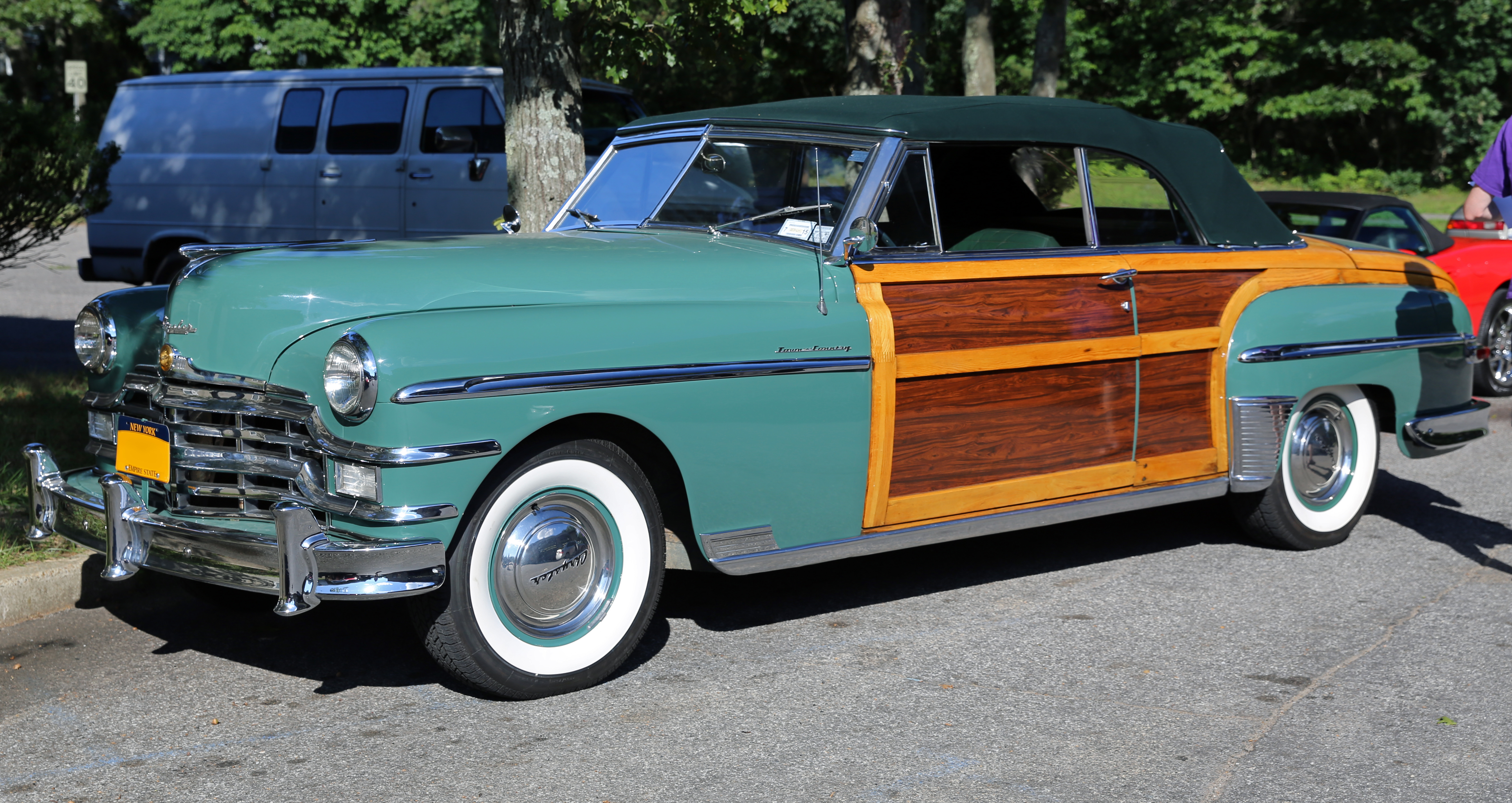
- 1949 New Yorker Town & Country convertible coupe (C46 Series)

Overview
- Model years: 1949–1954
- Assembly: United States: Detroit, Michigan (Jefferson Avenue Assembly); United States: Los Angeles, California (Maywood Assembly)
- Designer: K.T. Keller

Body and chassis
- Body style: 4-door sedan 2-door coupe 2-door hardtop 2-door convertible 4-door station wagon
- Layout: FR layout
- Related: Chrysler Imperial; Chrysler Town & Country; Chrysler Saratoga; Chrysler Windsor; Chrysler Royal; DeSoto Custom; DeSoto Firedome; DeSoto Powermaster

Powertrain
- Engine: 323.5 cu in (5.3 L) Spitfire Straight Eight; 331 cu in (5.4 L) FirePower V8
- Transmission: 4-speed Presto-Matic; 4-speed Fluid Drive

Dimensions
- Wheelbase: 131.5 in (3,340 mm) & 125.5 in (3,190 mm)
- Length: 211.75 in (5,378 mm) (1949–1950); 213.25 in (5,417 mm) (1951–1952)
- Width: 75.12 in (1,908 mm) (1949–1952); 76.25 in (1,937 mm) (1953)
- Height: 62.75 in (1,594 mm) (1953)

The 1949 New Yorker used Chrysler Corporation's new post-war body with ponton three-box styling, which was shared with Dodge and DeSoto. The engine remained the 323.5 cu in (5.3 L) straight eight coupled to Fluid Drive and the Presto-Matic four-speed semi-automatic. Body styles were reduced to club coupe, four-door sedan, and convertible. The wheelbase on the New Yorker was increased to 131.5 in (3,340 mm) from the 127.5 in (3,240 mm) frame introduced in 1941. The previous design had been carried through early 1949, with the new (C46) series having been delayed due to a strike in late 1948. A padded dashboard was optional.

A new body style was introduced for 1950: a two-door hardtop called the Newport and the Special Club coupe. Further upgrades included foam rubber padding on the dashboard for safety. The New Yorker was the more deluxe of the regular eight-cylinder Chryslers. At the same time, the Saratoga was repositioned lower in the hierarchy, offering the straight eight with plainer trim with cloth upholstery in several colors, the 135 hp (101 kW) Spitfire straight-eight engine, and a roomy interior featuring "chair height" seats. The "Presto-Matic" fluid drive transmission had two forward ranges, each with two speeds. In everyday driving, the high range was engaged using the clutch. The car could then be driven without using the clutch (unless reverse or low range was required); at any speed above 13 mph (21 km/h), the driver released the accelerator, and the transmission shifted into the higher gear of the range with a slight "clunk". When the car came to a stop, the lower gear was again engaged.

Chrysler introduced the 180 hp (134 kW) FirePower Hemi V8 for 1951. The FirePower Hemi equipped cars could accelerate 0 to 60 mph (97 km/h) in 10 seconds, faster than the Oldsmobile 88 Rocket engine of that time. This engine became popular among hot rodders and racers.

The New Yorker also offered Fluid Torque Drive, with an actual torque converter, instead of the Fluid Drive units. Cars with Fluid Torque Drive came only with Fluid Matic semi-automatic transmission and had a gear selector quadrant on the steering column. Hydraguide power steering, an industry first, appeared as an option on Chrysler cars with the Hemi engine.

A station wagon was available for 1951, with only 251 built. Its 131.5 in (3,340 mm) wheelbase is the longest ever used on a station wagon.

The 1952 model year saw a minor redesign of taillights with backup lights in the lower section. This was also the final year for the 131.5 in (3,340 mm) wheelbase chassis for the New Yorker.

Harold A. Clark used a New Yorker as the base for a full-size sports car called the "Clark Cyclonic". The price was approximately $15,000 ($180,280 in 2025 dollars), and Clark planned to produce 48 during the first year. Whether this car ever reached production is not known.

The 1953 model year New Yorker had a less bulky look with the wheelbase reduced to 125.5 in (3,190 mm), a one-piece curved windshield, rear fenders integrated into the body, and pull-style exterior door handles. Wire wheels were now an option. The Saratoga line was discontinued for 1953 and replaced by the New Yorker. The previous New Yorker model positioning was redesignated as the New Yorker DeLuxe. The convertible and Newport hardtop were available only in the New Yorker DeLuxe line, while the base New Yorker offered a long-wheelbase sedan and a Town & Country wagon. The convertible was New Yorker's most expensive model on the 125.5 in (3,190 mm) chassis for 1953, with 950 built.

The six cylinder was replaced in 1954 with the popular 195 hp (145 kW) FirePower V8; a DeLuxe option was rated at 235 hp (175 kW). Although it was introduced very late in the 1953 model year, all 1954 New Yorkers were available with the new two-speed Powerflite automatic transmission. Fluid Torque Drive and Fluid Matic were dropped. 1954 was the last year the long-wheelbase sedan was offered by Chrysler.

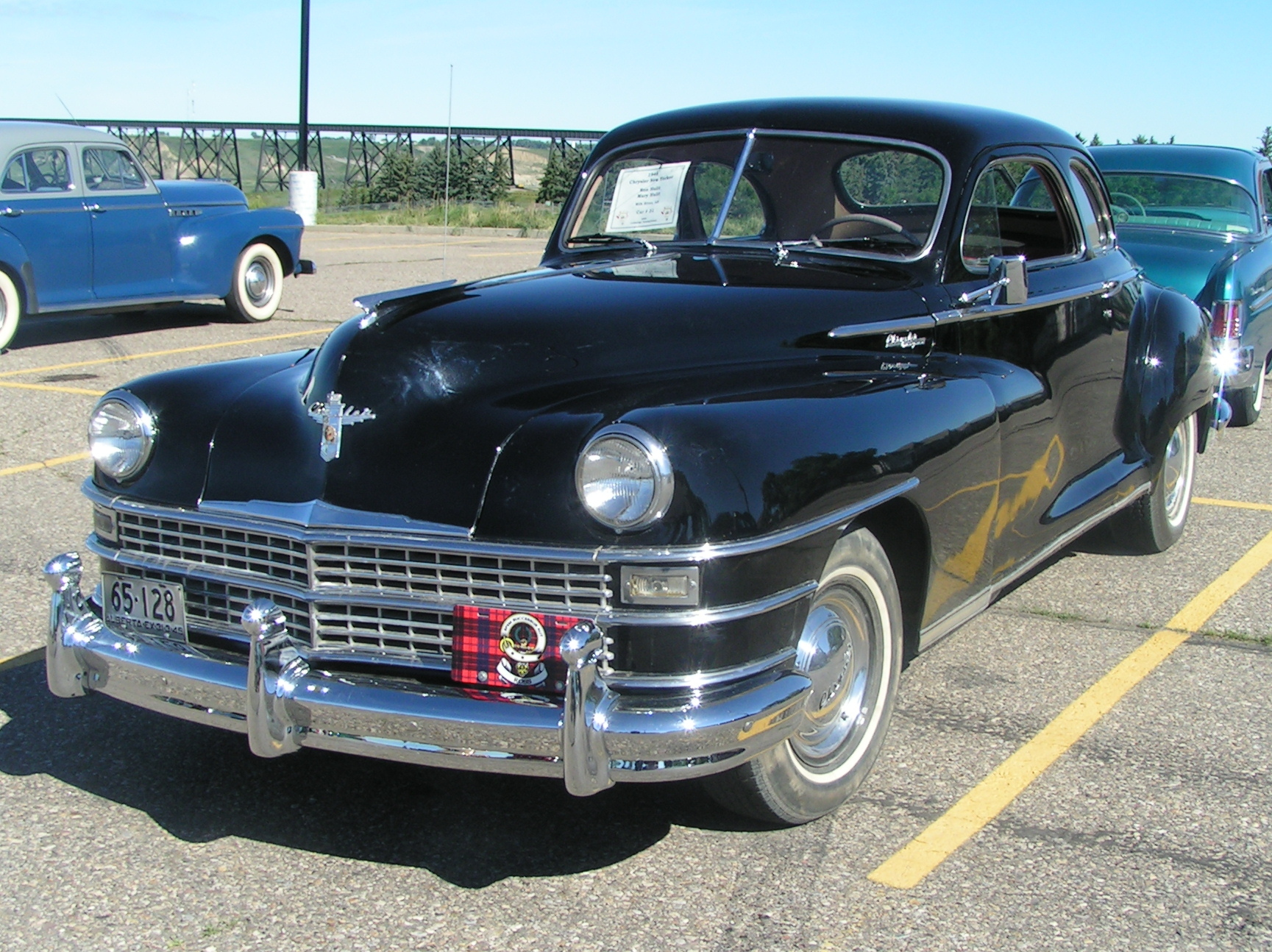
1949 New Yorker Coupe (C39 Series)

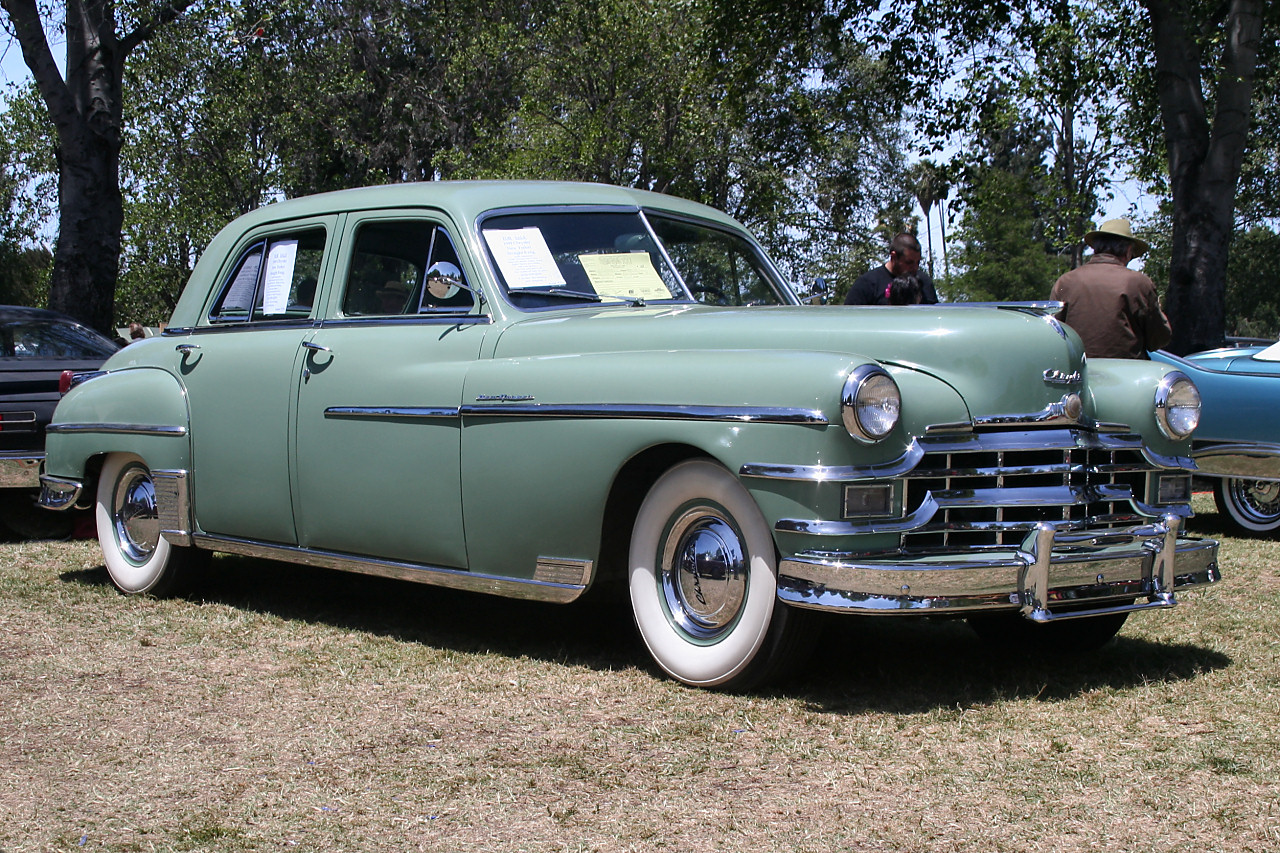
1949 New Yorker Four-Door Sedan (C46 Series)

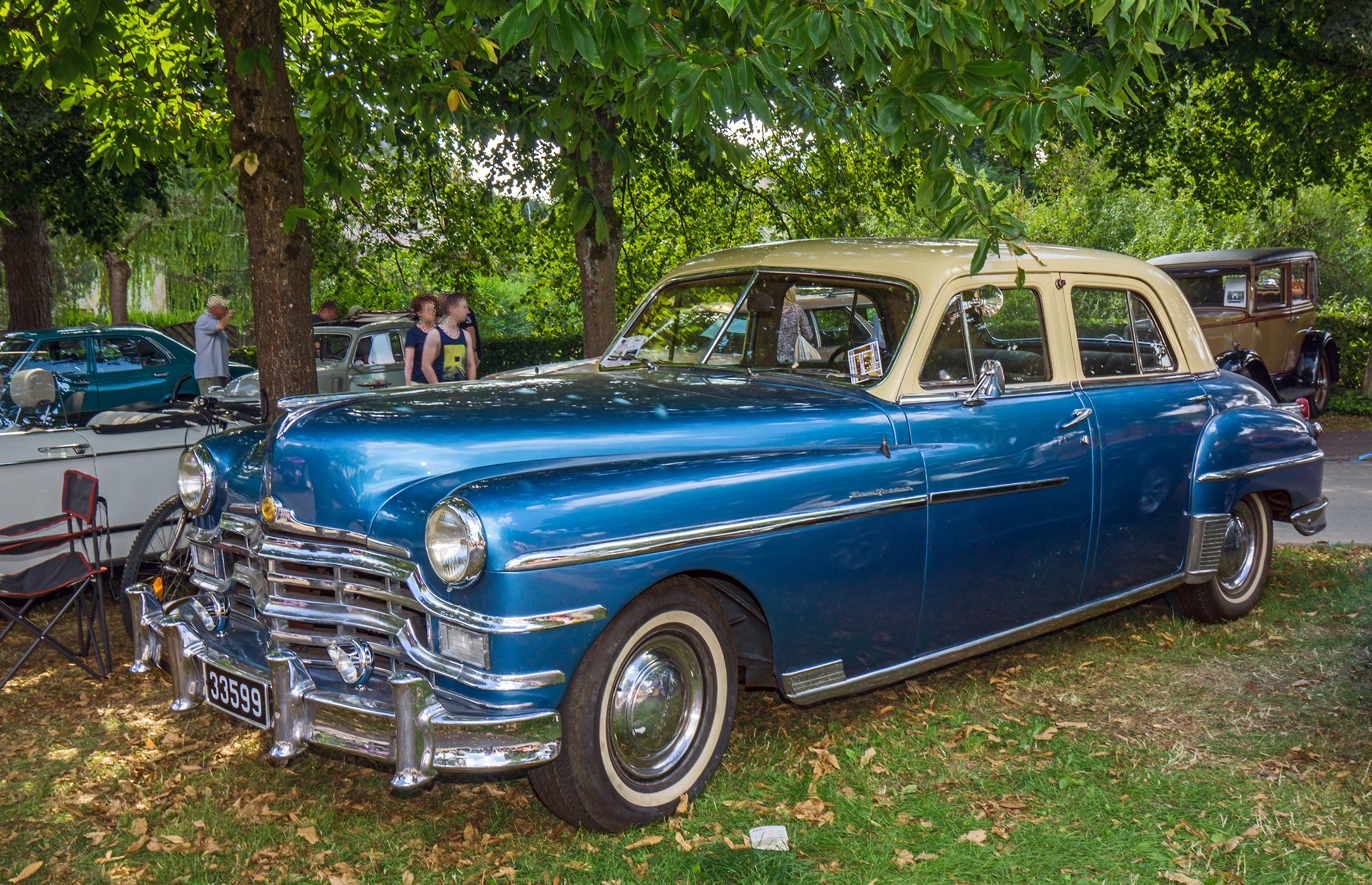
1950 New Yorker Four-Door Sedan (C46 Series)

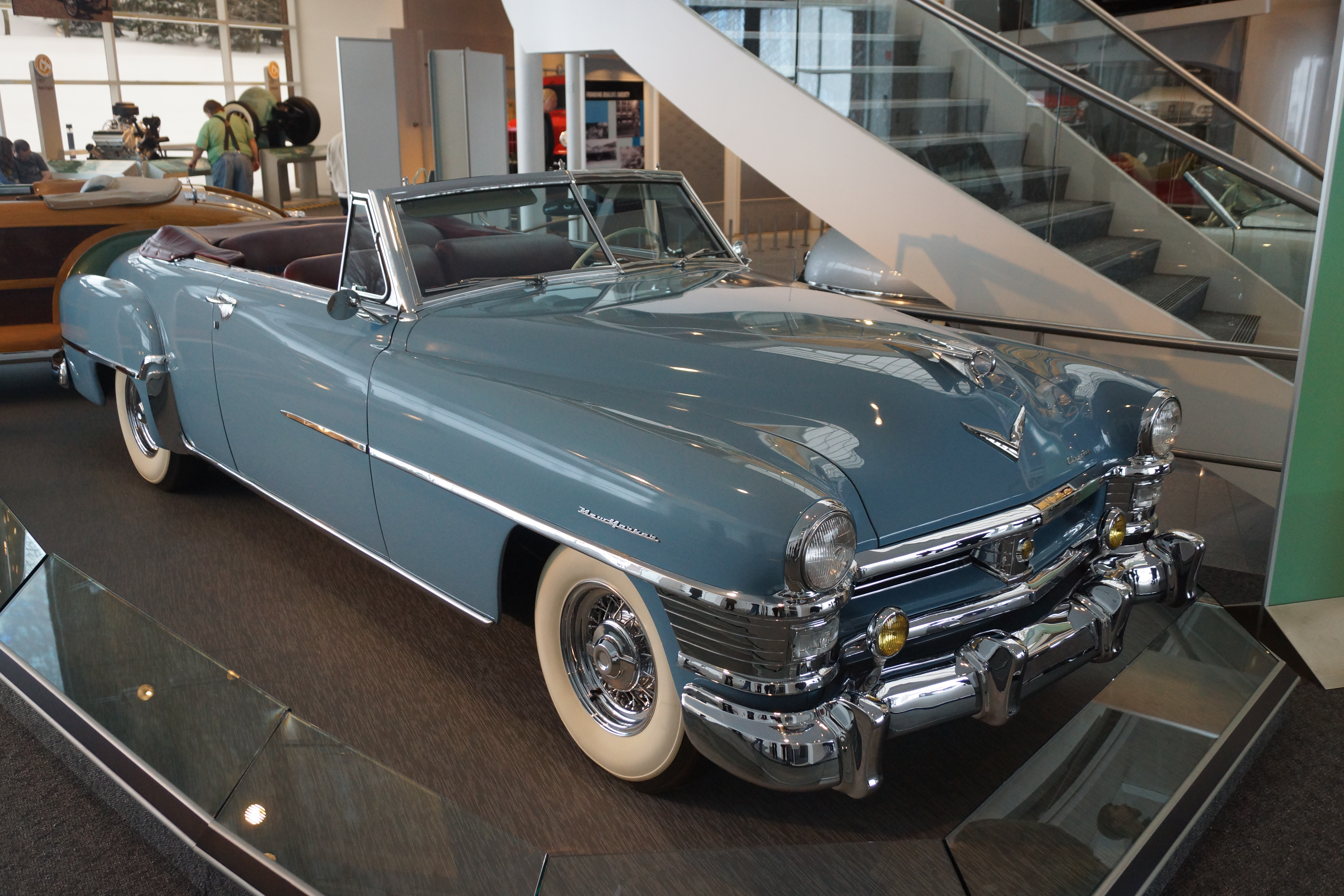
1951 New Yorker convertible

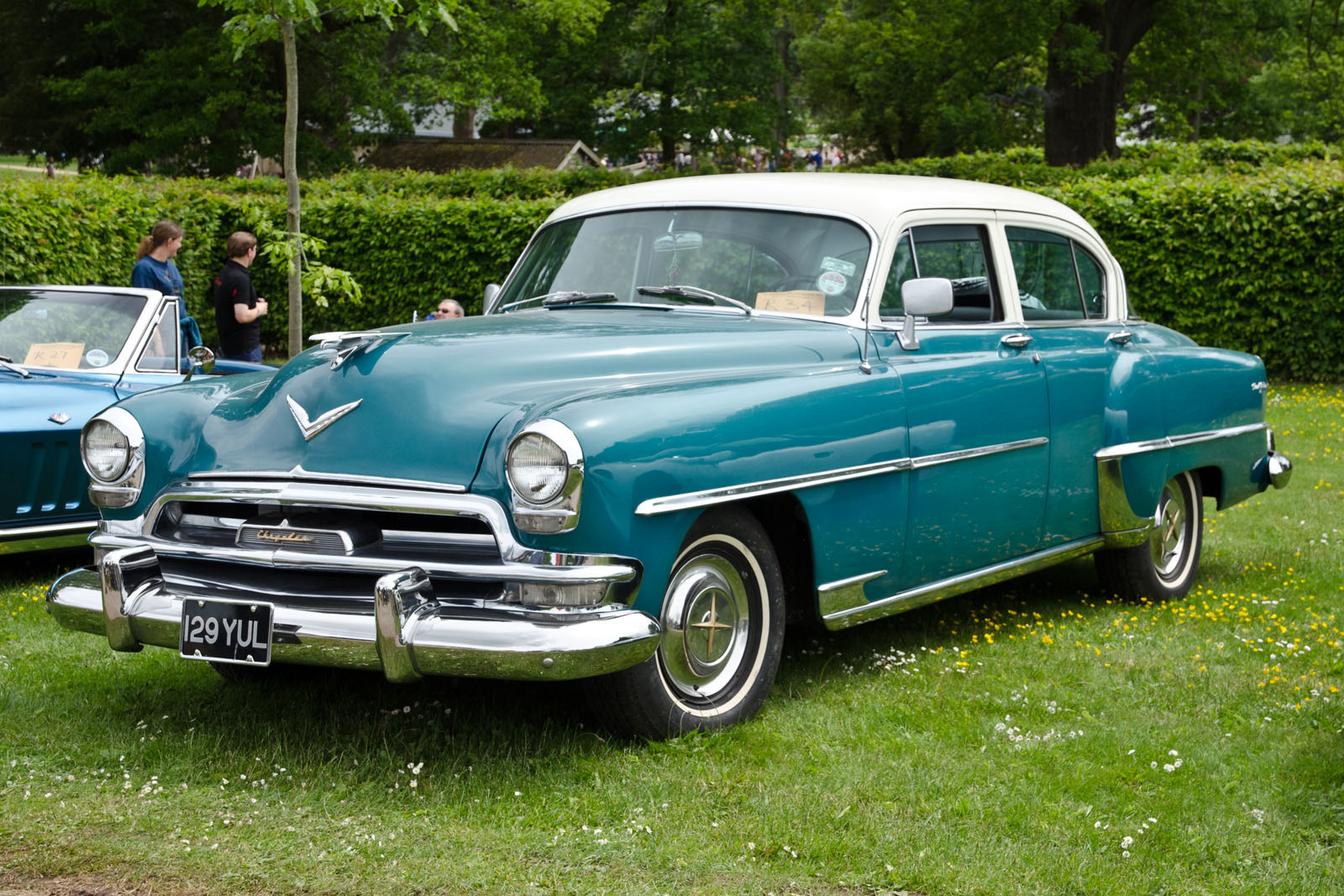
1954 New Yorker

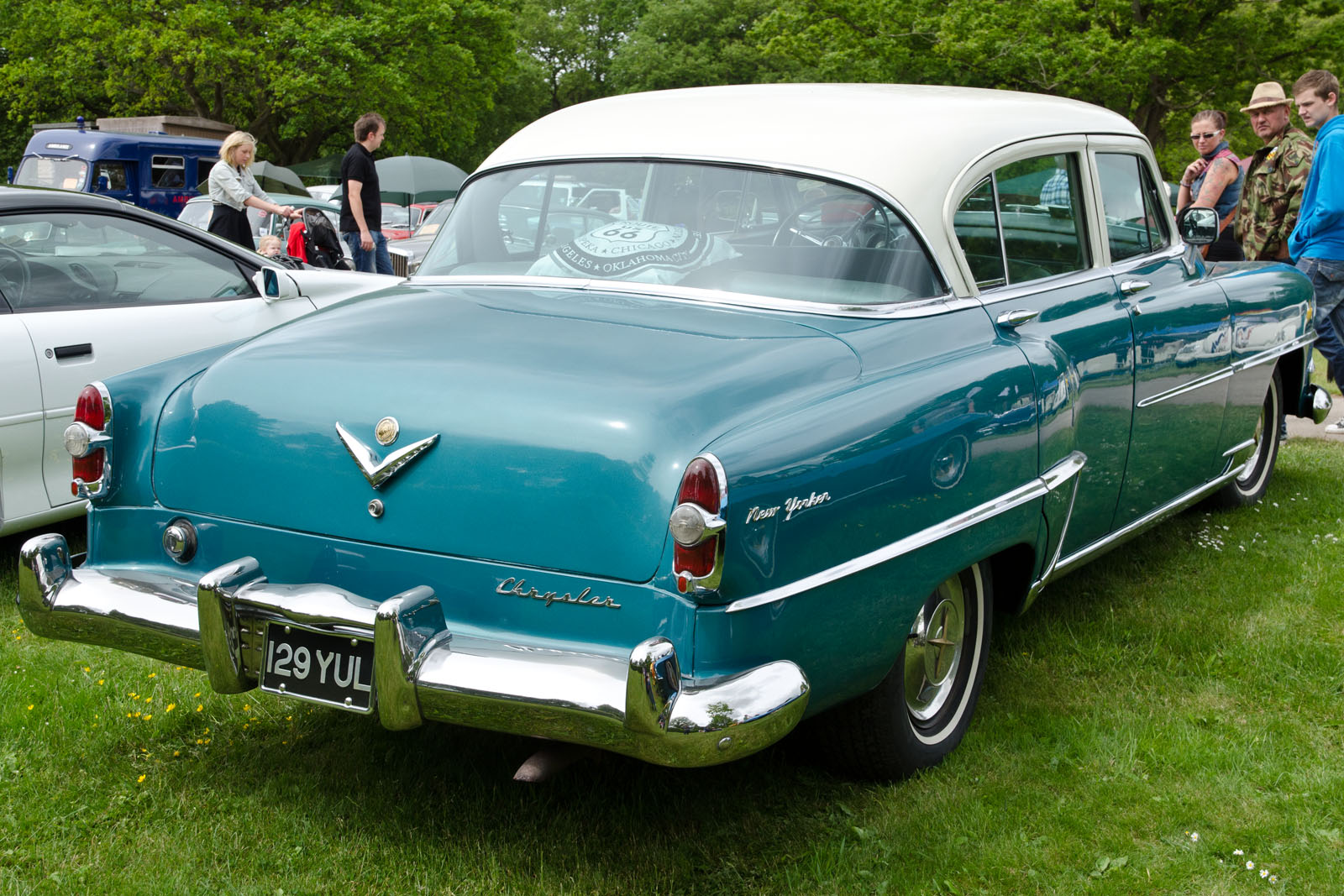
1954 New Yorker

== 1955–1956 ==
Series C-68 / C-72
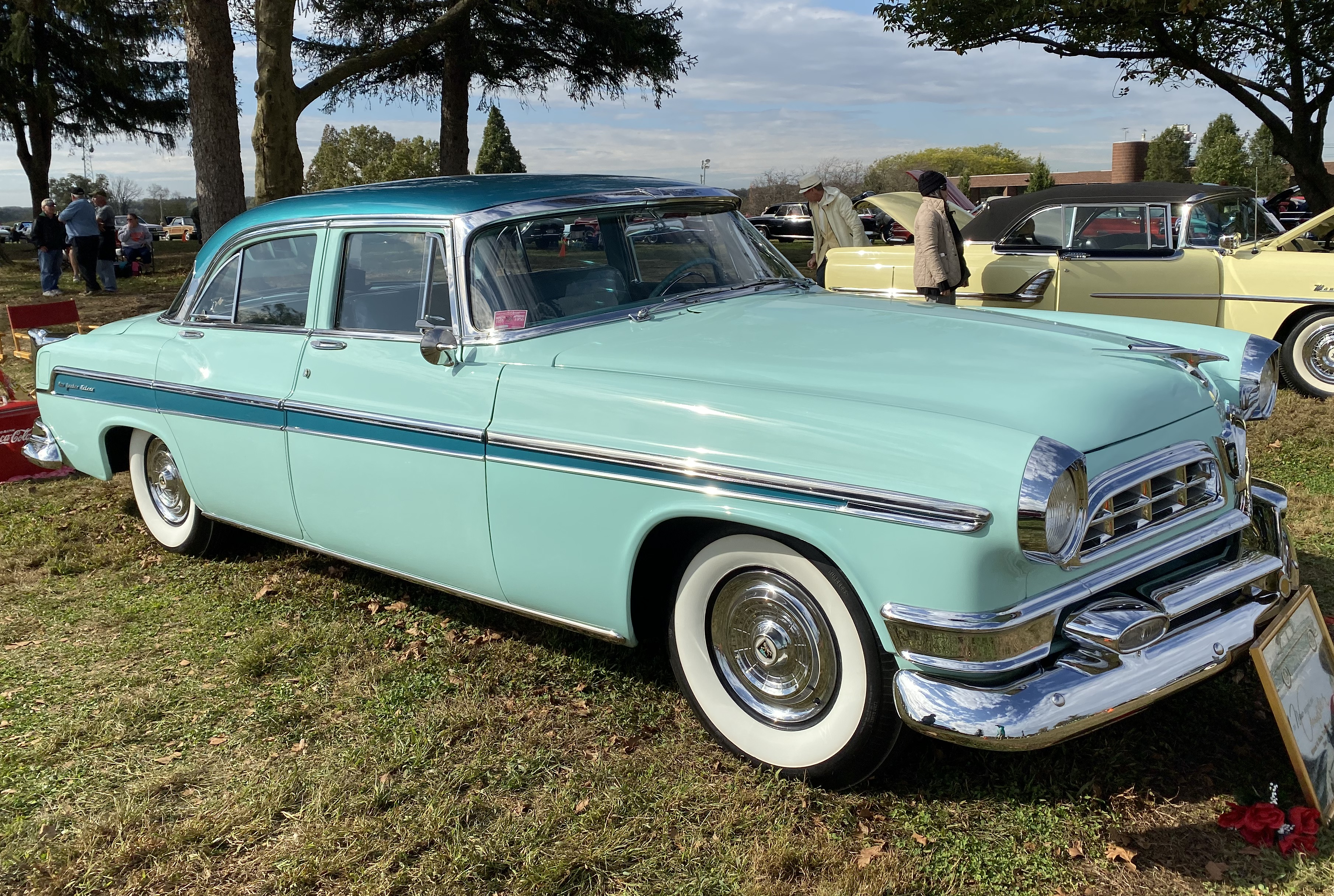
- 1955 New Yorker 4-door sedan

Overview
- Model years: 1955–1956
- Assembly: United States: Detroit, Michigan (Jefferson Avenue Assembly); United States: Los Angeles, California (Maywood Assembly)

Body and chassis
- Body style: 2-door hardtop 2-door convertible 4-door sedan 4-door hardtop 4-door station wagon
- Layout: FR layout
- Related: Chrysler 300; Chrysler Town & Country; Chrysler Windsor; DeSoto Fireflite; DeSoto Firedome; DeSoto Adventurer (concept car); Chrysler Falcon

Powertrain
- Engine: 331 cu in (5.4 L) FirePower V8; 354 cu in (5.8 L) Hemi-V8
- Transmission: 2-speed PowerFlite automatic (1955); 3-speed TorqueFlite automatic (1956)

Dimensions
- Wheelbase: 126.0 in (3,200 mm)
- Length: 218.8 in (5,558 mm) (1955–1956)
- Width: 79 in (2,007 mm)

For the 1955 model year, Chrysler introduced new designs that borrowed styling cues from Virgil Exner's custom 1952 Imperial Parade Phaeton. These replaced the out-of-fashion high roofline designs of K.T. Keller. Additionally, the Imperial luxury brand was reintroduced. A new four-door hardtop body style became available. The tradition of adding Newport as a suffix to the model name continued, while the "St. Regis" nameplate was used for hardtops with exclusive two-tone paint. The Hemi V8's output was up to 250 hp (186 kW), another step forward in Detroit's ongoing horsepower war, while the Chrysler 300 offered higher amounts of horsepower from the same displacement engine. The PowerFlite transmission added a control lever on the instrument panel for 1955.

All New Yorkers for 1955 were now given the "DeLuxe" suffix, and the Imperial Newport two-door hardtop replaced the Club Coupe. The new, higher-priced St. Regis two-door hardtop filled the position of the former Chrysler Windsor. The sedan, convertible, and Town & Country wagon were offered.

Chrysler desigmated the 1956 model's design "PowerStyle", a product of Chrysler designer Virgil Exner. The New Yorker gained a new mesh grille, leather seats, pushbutton TorqueFlite selector, and a 354 cubic inch Hemi V8 with 280 hp (209 kW). A four-door pillarless hardtop made its debut, and the "DeLuxe" nameplate was dropped from the New Yorker for 1956.

Chrysler introduced an under-dash mounted 16 2/3 rpm record player, dubbed the "Highway Hi-Fi", that was manufactured by CBS Electronics. A two-way switch in the dash changed the input for the speaker from the all-transistor radio to the 7-inch record player. The St. Regis two-door hardtop was available with a choice of nine optional three-tone paint schemes, and the Town & Country Wagon model was Chrysler's most expensive vehicle labeled as a Chrysler for 1956, listed at $4,523. Only 921 convertibles were made.

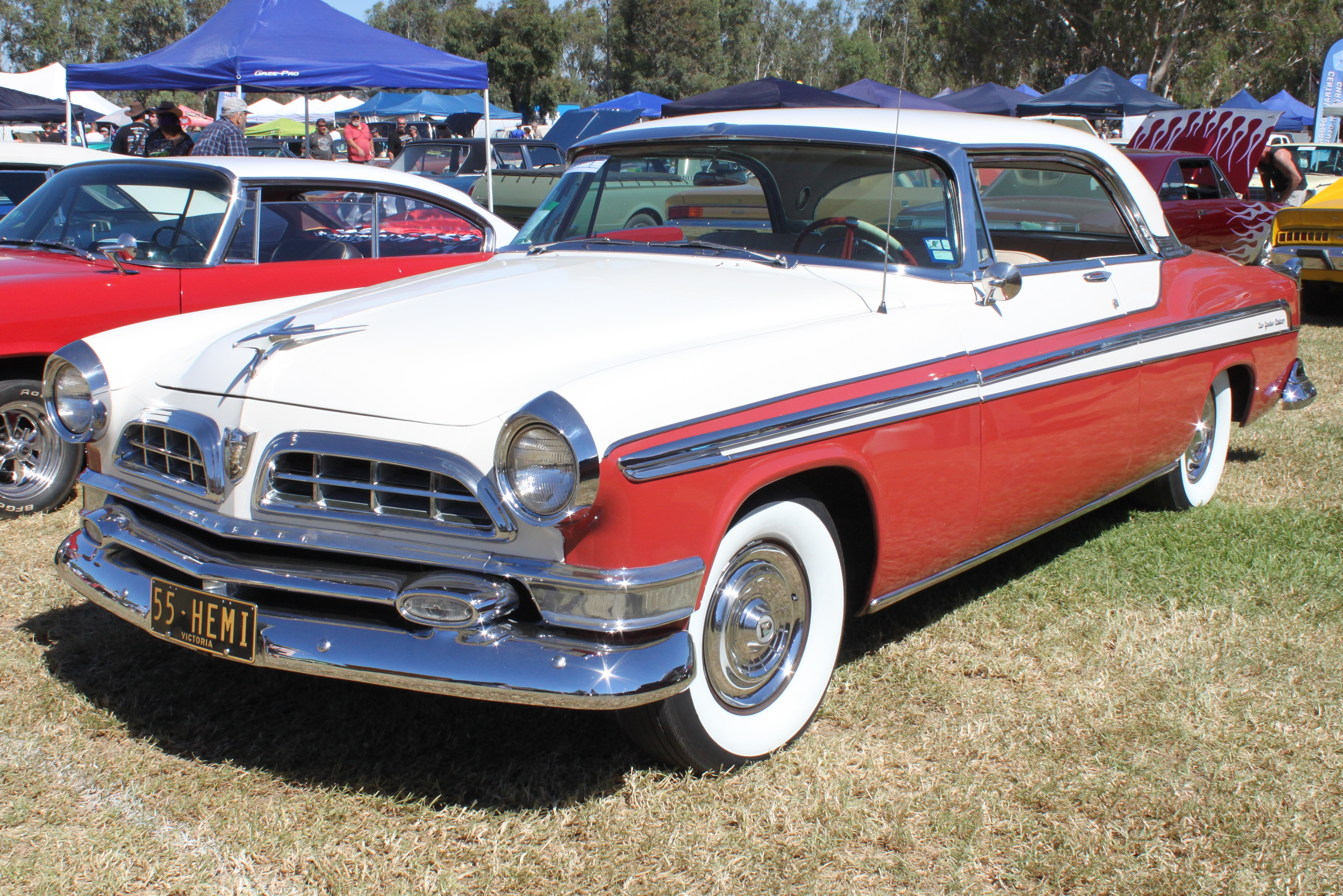
1955 New Yorker Deluxe St. Regis hardtop coupe

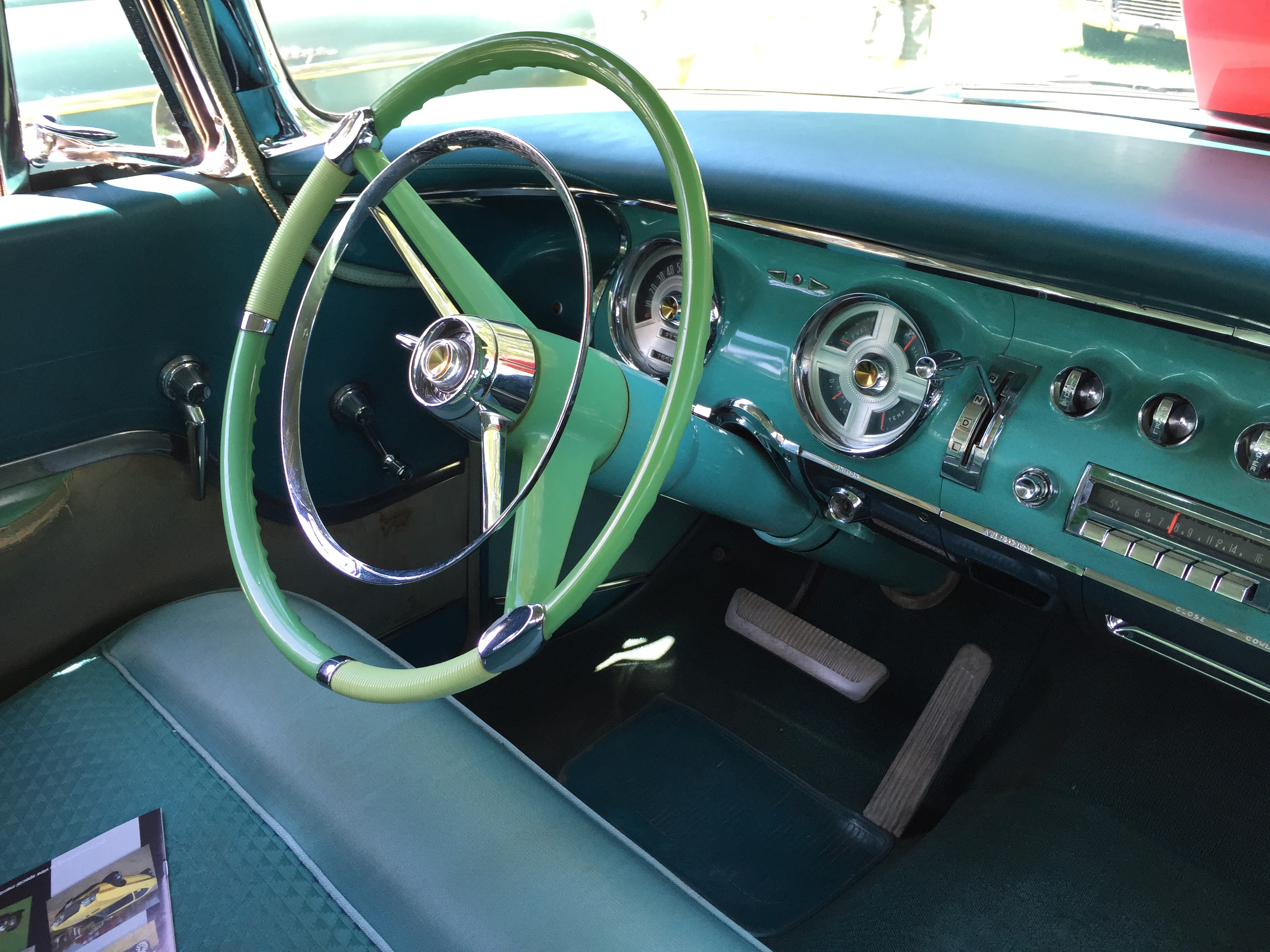
1955 New Yorker interior

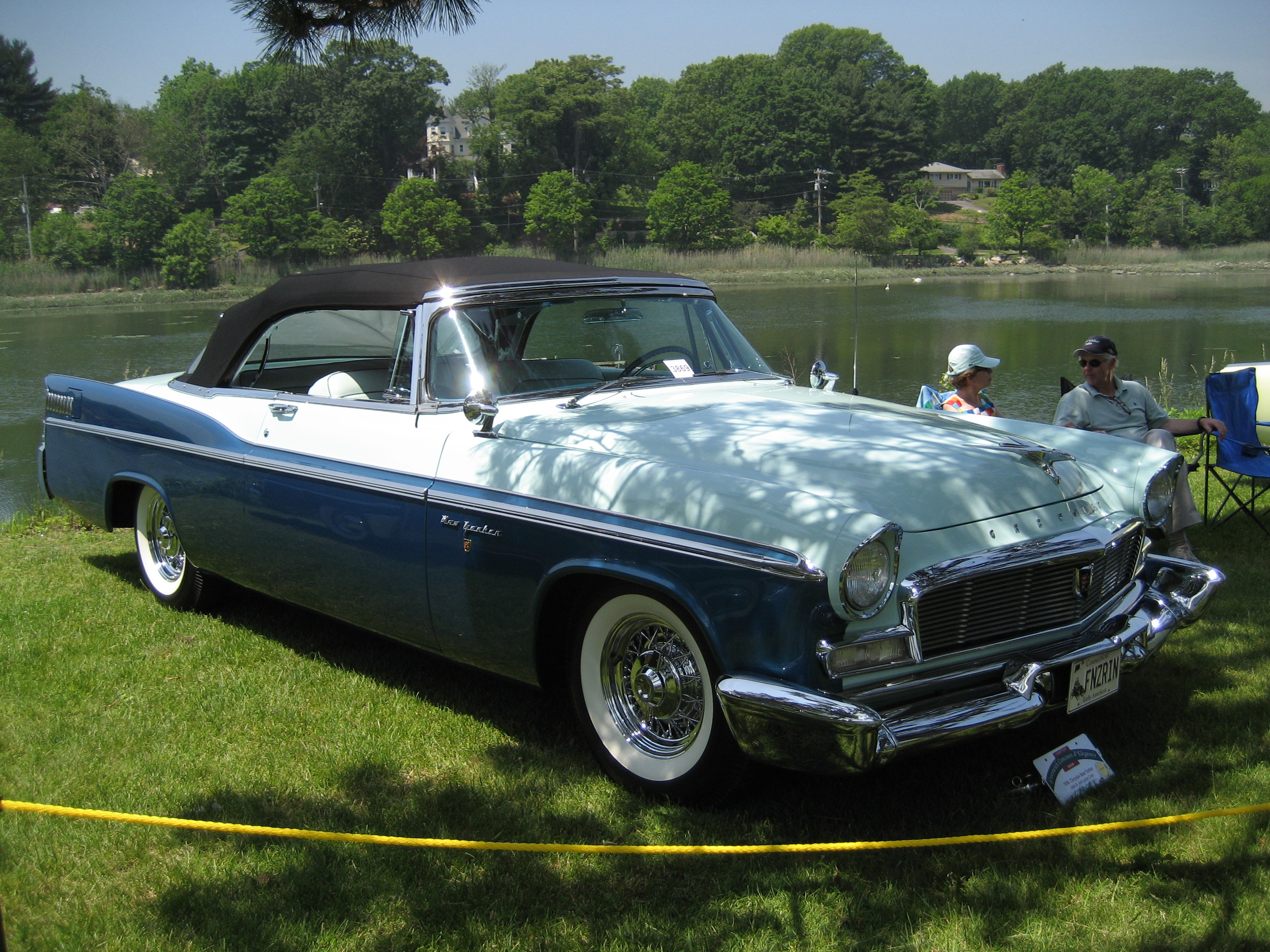
1956 New Yorker St. Regis convertible coupe

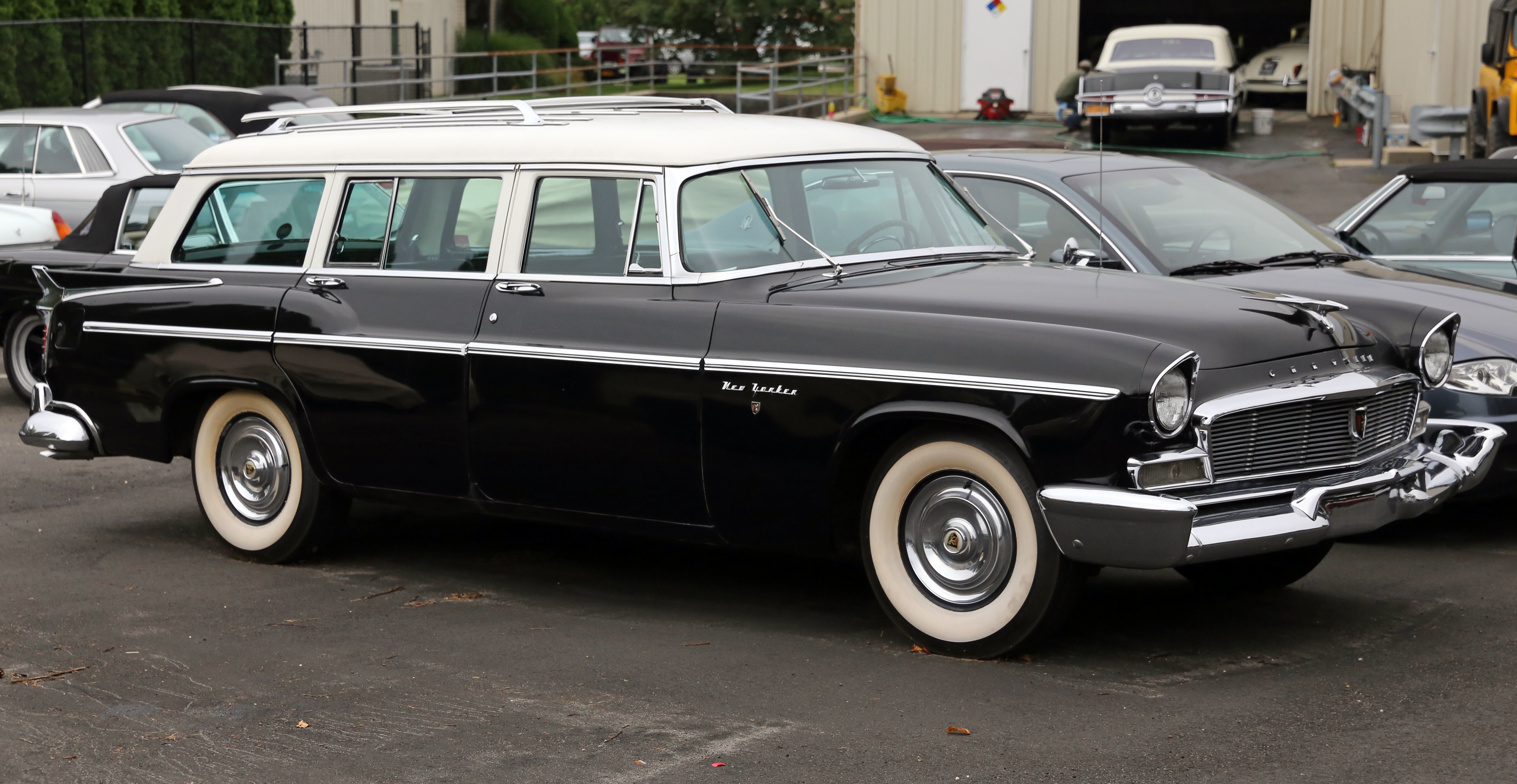
1956 New Yorker Town & Country

== 1957–1959 ==
Series C-76 / LC3-H / MC3-H
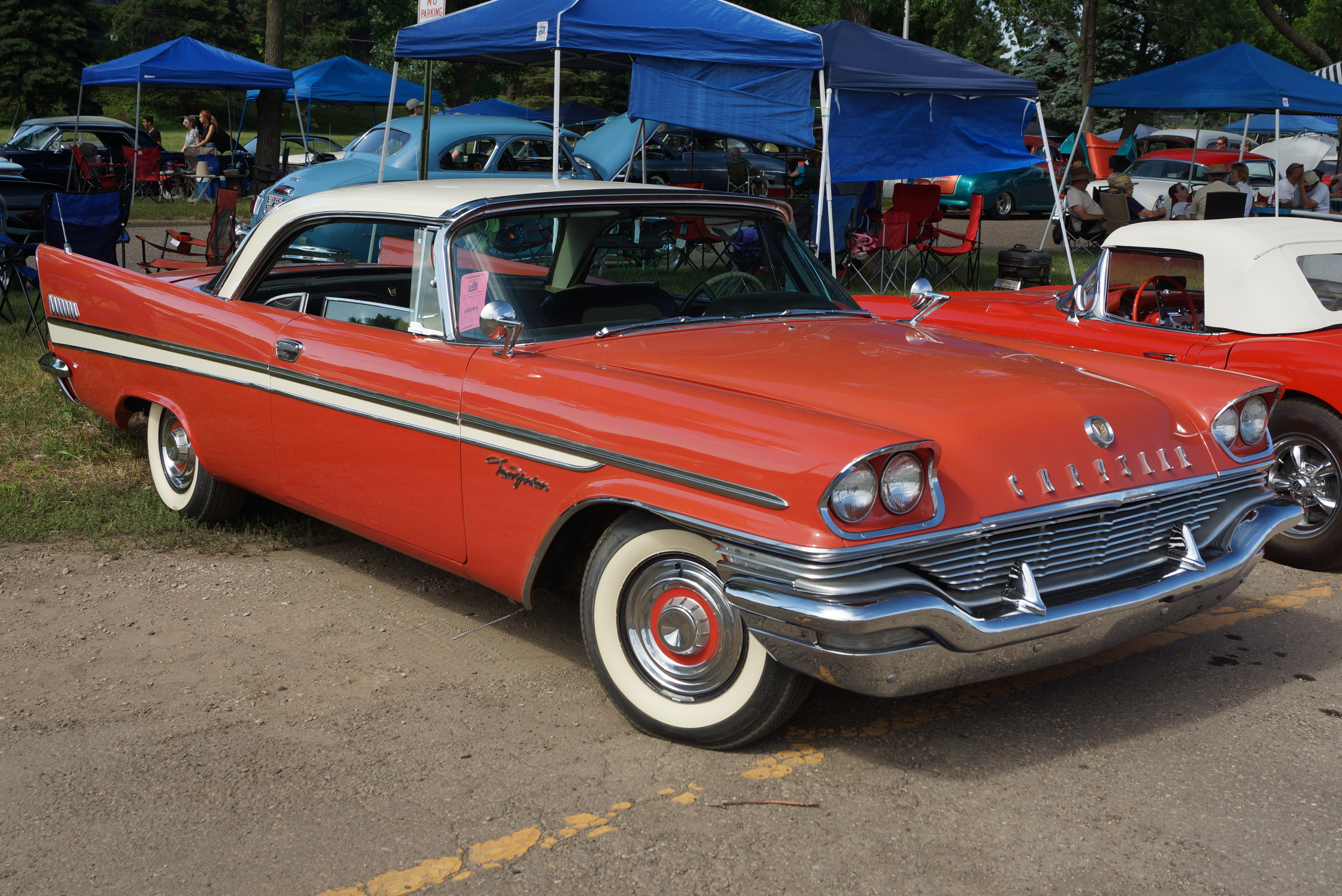
- 1957 New Yorker 2-door hardtop

Overview
- Model years: 1957–1959
- Assembly: United States: Detroit, Michigan (Jefferson Avenue Assembly); United States: Los Angeles, California (Maywood Assembly)
- Designer: Virgil Exner

Body and chassis
- Body style: 2-door hardtop 2-door convertible 4-door sedan 4-door hardtop 4-door station wagon
- Layout: FR layout
- Related: Chrysler 300; Chrysler Town & Country; Chrysler Saratoga; Chrysler Windsor; DeSoto Adventurer; DeSoto Fireflite; DeSoto Firedome

Powertrain
- Engine: 392 cu in (6.4 L) Hemi-V8; 413 cu in (6.8 L) Wedge V8
- Transmission: 3-speed TorqueFlite automatic

Dimensions
- Wheelbase: 126.0 in (3,200 mm)
- Length: 219.2 in (1957); 220.9 in (1959)

The 1957 Chrysler cars were redesigned with Virgil Exner's "Forward Look", which cost $300 million when Chrysler took on a loan from Prudential Insurance in 1954 to pay for expansion and updated car designs. The New Yorker sported fins that swept up from just behind the front doors, and its Hemi V8 was increased to 392 cu in (6.4 L) and 325 hp (242 kW). The TorqueFlite three-speed automatic transmission and a Torsion-Aire torsion bar front suspension were standard.

Early model year production had single headlamps with quad headlamps optional where state regulations permitted them. The single headlamps were dropped later in the year. A total of 10,948 New Yorkers were built, 1,049 of them convertibles.

The 1958 New Yorker received new body-side trim and smaller taillights. The Hemi output was increased again to 345 hp (257 kW). "Auto-Pilot" cruise control was introduced. Sales decreased due to the recession of 1958. The convertible model was still available, with only 666 made. The reputation of Chrysler cars became tainted due to rust problems caused by rushed production and testing.

The FirePower Hemi V8 in 1959 New Yorkers was replaced by a new, less expensive to produce wedge head 413 cu in (6.8 L) 350 hp (261 kW) Golden Lion V8. Tailfins and the front end were altered. With the departure of the Hemi, the New Yorker line was repositioned as a luxury car with styling similar to the 1958 Imperial.

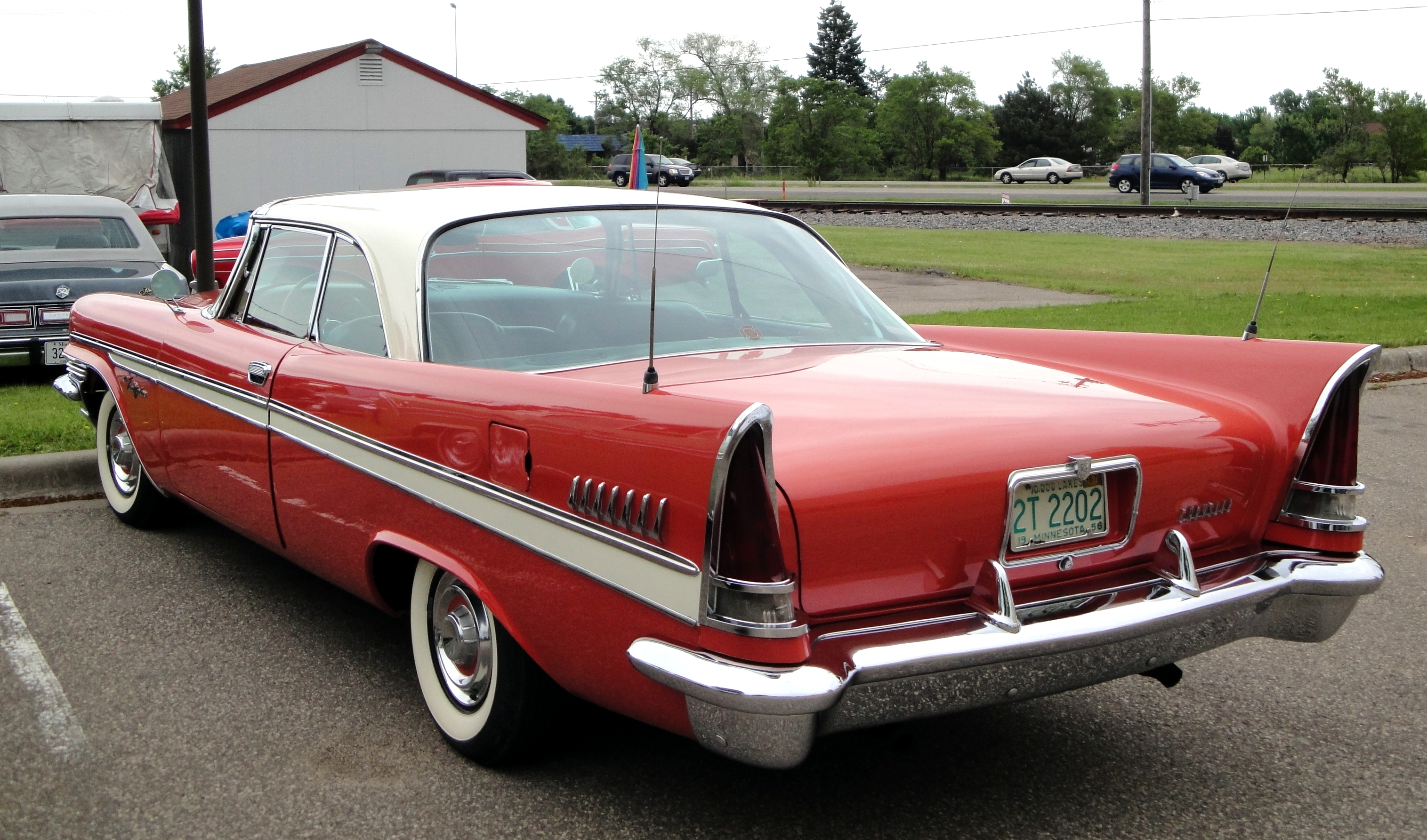
1957 New Yorker 2-door hardtop rear

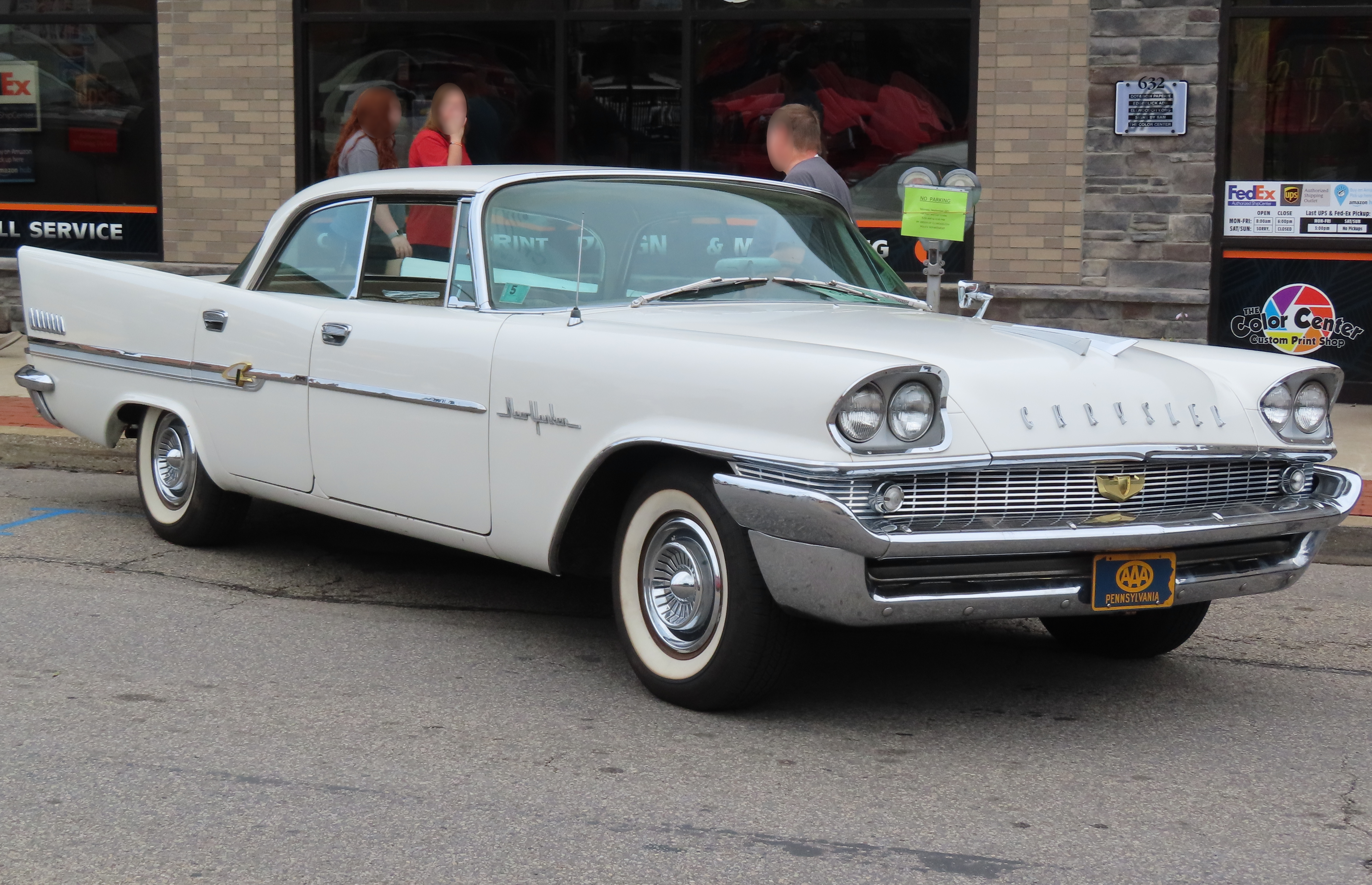
1958 New Yorker 4-door hardtop

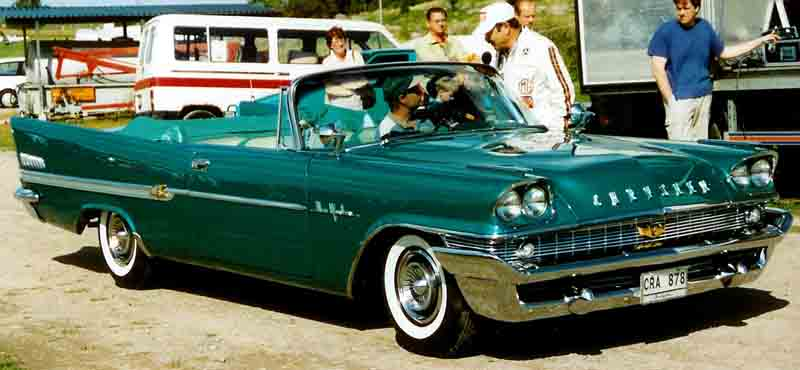
1958 New Yorker Convertible

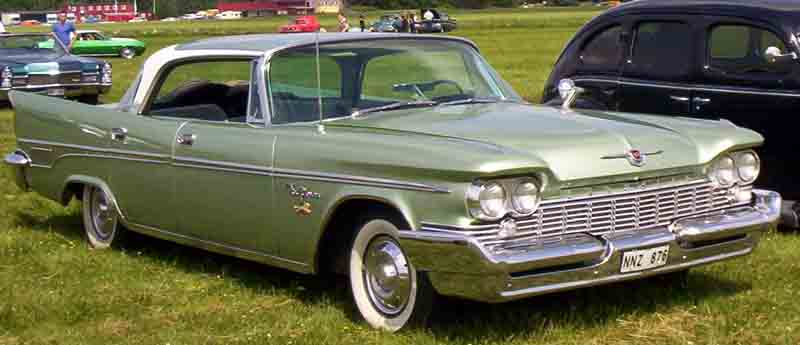
1959 New Yorker 4-door hardtop

== 1960–1964 ==
Series PC3-H / RC3-H / SC3-H / TC3-H / VC3-H
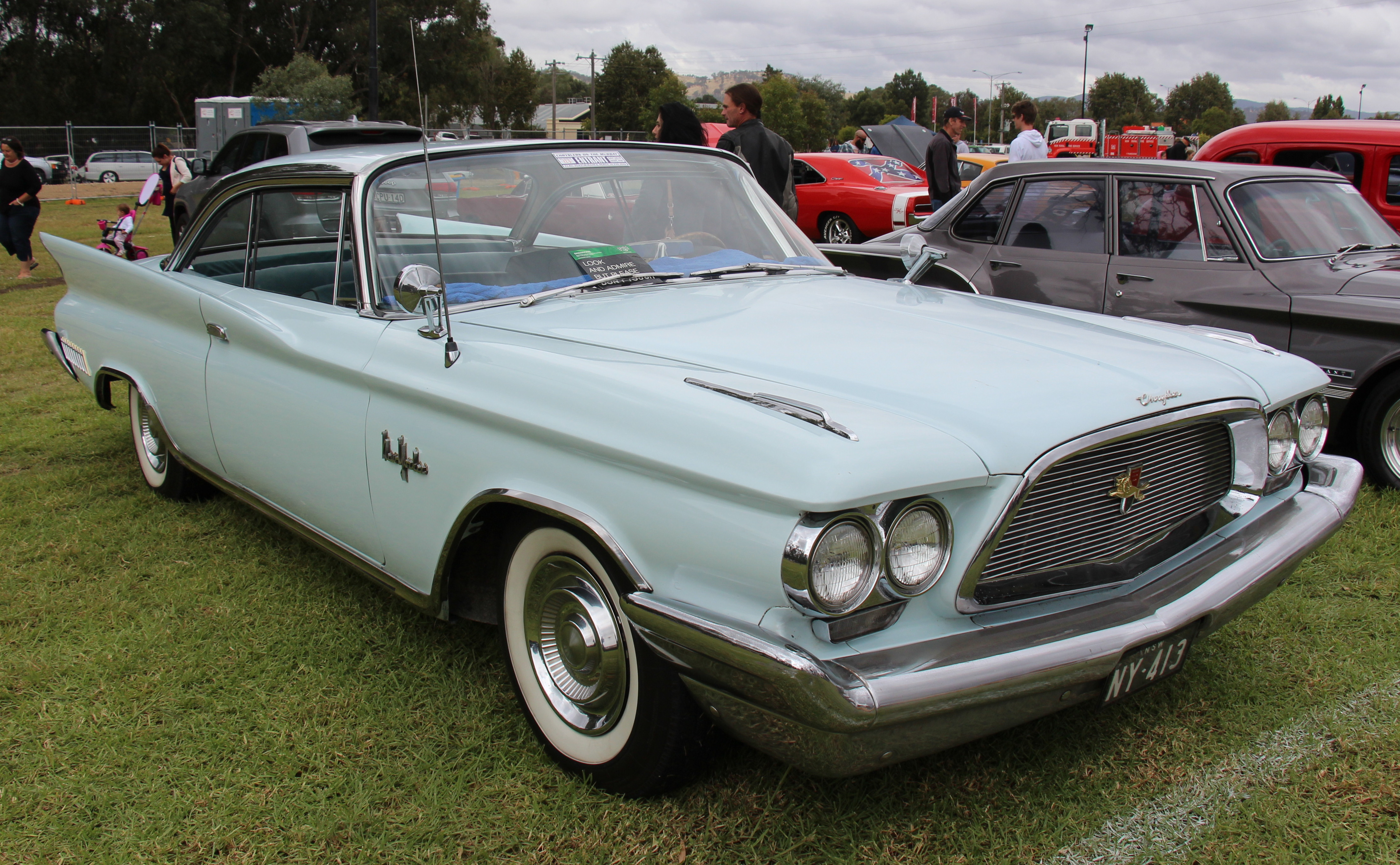
- 1960 New Yorker 2-door hardtop

Overview
- Model years: 1960–1964
- Assembly: United States: Detroit, Michigan (Jefferson Avenue Assembly); United States: Los Angeles, California (Maywood Assembly)

Body and chassis
- Body style: 2-door hardtop 2-door convertible 4-door sedan 4-door hardtop 4-door hardtop station wagon
- Layout: FR layout
- Related: Imperial Crown & Le Baron; Chrysler 300; Chrysler Town & Country; Chrysler Saratoga; Chrysler Windsor; Chrysler Newport; Dodge Custom 880; Plymouth Fury

Powertrain
- Engine: 413 cu in (6.8 L) Wedge V8

Dimensions
- Wheelbase: 126.0 in (3,200 mm); 1963–1964: 122.0 in (3,099 mm)

The 1960 New Yorkers used unibody construction, and the carry-over RB engine had an output of 350 hp (261 kW). Starting with 1960, all Chrysler models adopted the grille appearance from the Chrysler 300F. The rear bucket seats from the 300 models were optional on the New Yorker Custom coupe.

The 1961 New Yorker featured a new grille, slanted headlights, and a continental kit appearance on the trunk lid. The 413 CID "RB" Golden Lion V8 continued. This was the last of the "Forward Look" models. Chrysler built 2,541 New Yorker two-door hardtops, in Canada through 1964 and 1965 in the U.S., and no longer used the "Newport" nameplate for hardtop models when the Chrysler Newport became its model line.

The program to create new Chryslers for the 1962 model year was abruptly canceled in 1960. The alternative, as detailed by Chrysler designer Jeffrey I. Godshall, was instead to take Chrysler Corporation's full-sized 1961 models and literally "mix-and-match" them to create the 1962 models. The 1962 New Yorkers would only be offered as four-door models. Thus, both the 1962 hardtop sedan and the pillared sedan were made by taking the front end of a 1961 New Yorker (updated for 1962) and mating it to the de-finned body of a corresponding 1961 four-door Dodge Polara sedan. The Polara, which was Dodge's only long-wheelbase model, was chosen because its body's smoother sides proved to be easier to work with when creating a finless body, a significant requirement for the redesign. The 1961 Polara's existing tailfins and taillights were replaced by redesigned rear-quarter panels, which furnished the 1962 New Yorkers with finless rear fenders and new taillights. Similarly, the 1962 New Yorker station wagon was made by mating an updated front end of a 1961 New Yorker to the body of a 1961 four-door Plymouth Suburban station wagon. A station wagon was Plymouth's only long-wheelbase offering, and it was chosen because it was Chrysler Corporation's only finless full-sized station wagon. Thus, only four-door New Yorkers were offered in wagon, sedan, and hardtop body styles. The 1962 New Yorker was the last Chrysler to have a 126 in (3,200 mm) wheelbase.

The dash had been designed with Chrysler's push-button controls for the TorqueFlite automatic in mind, with the "AstraDome" instrument cluster covering the part of the steering column; a column shifter would come out from under then-standard practice, so manual cars used a floor shifter. Due to the installation of the "AstraDome" instrument cluster extending outward towards the steering wheel, the traditional installation of the turn signal lever was relocated to the dashboard underneath the "TorqueFlite" push-button gear selectors, and was installed as a sliding lever that would return to center as the steering wheel returned to the center position.

The 413 RB had a 4.1875 in (106 mm) bore and was used from 1959 until 1965. It powered all Chrysler New Yorker, 300G and 300H, and Imperial Custom, Crown, and LeBaron models during that period. It was also available on the Chrysler Newport, Dodge's Polara and Monaco, and the Plymouth Fury as an alternative to the 383-cubic-inch B series engine or the 318 Poly. With a compression ratio of 10:1, it developed 340 hp (254 kW) and 470 lb⋅ft (637 N⋅m) of torque with a four-barrel carburetor.

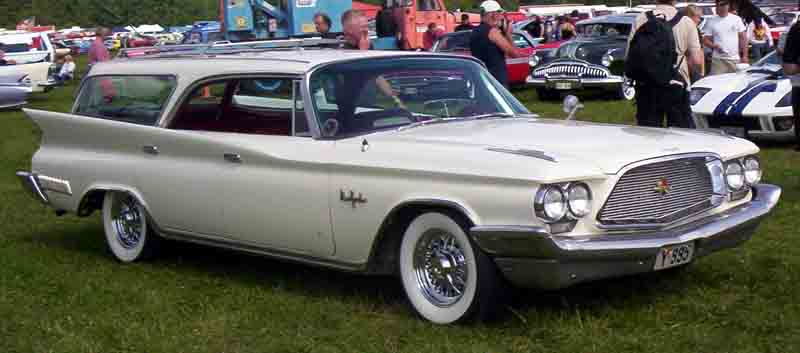
1960 New Yorker Town & Country

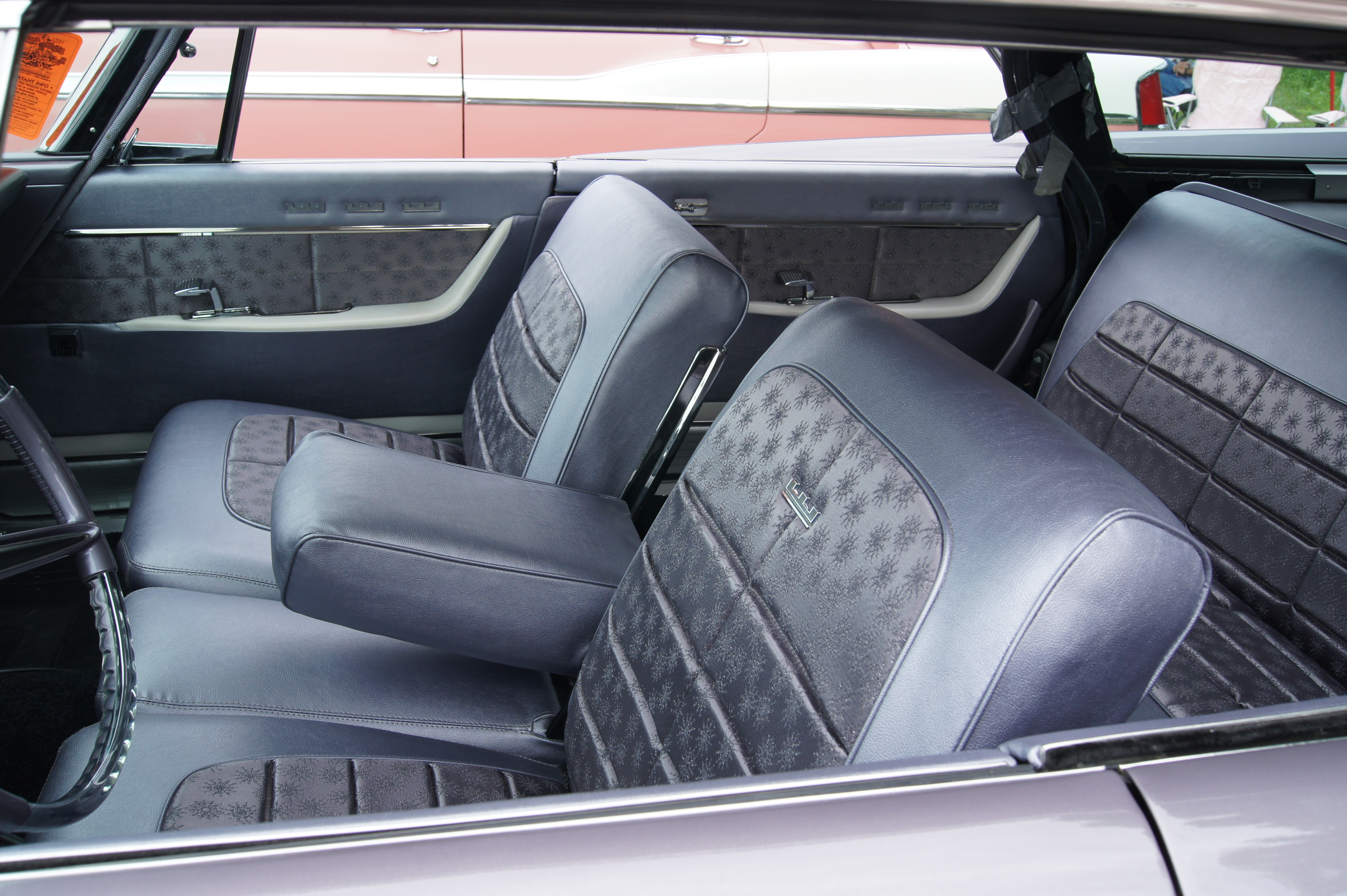
1960 New Yorker Town & Country hardtop station wagon interior

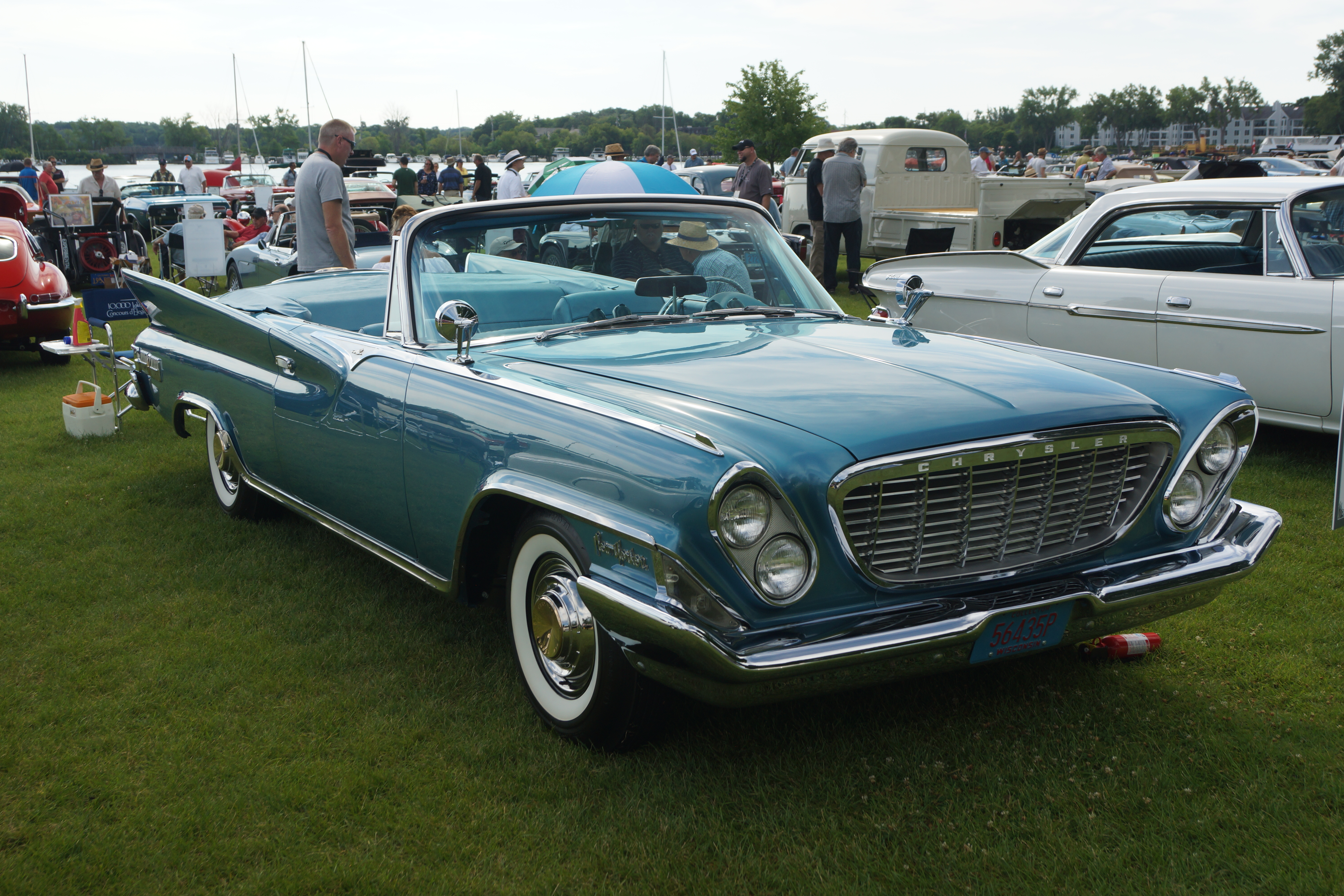
1961 New Yorker convertible

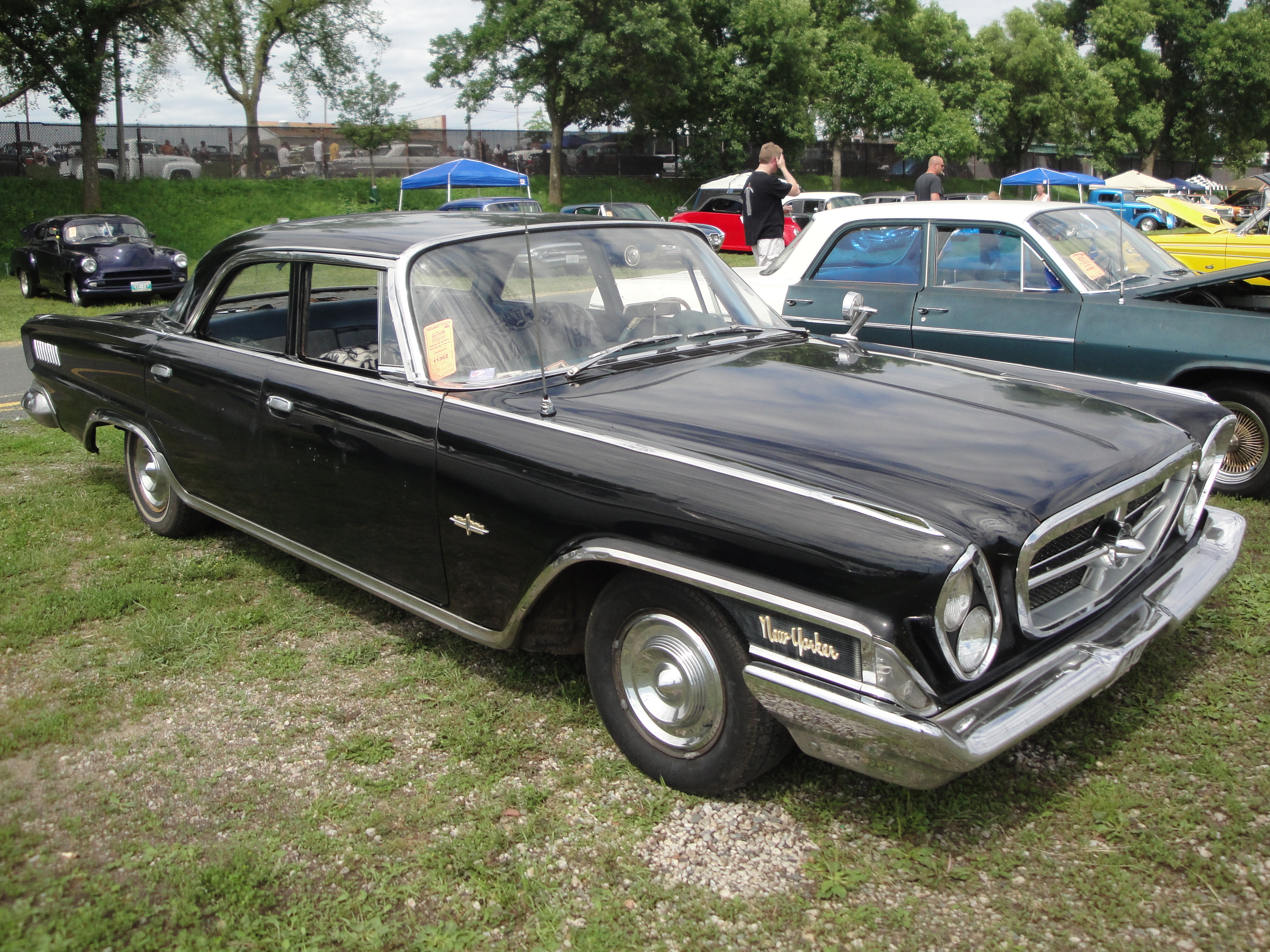
1962 New Yorker 4-door sedan

=== 1963–1964 ===
The 1963 New Yorker used Chrysler's wholly redesigned body, with only the windshield showing traces of the previous Forward Look designs. However, platform changes were minimal, with just a switch from 12-inch "Total Contact" to Bendix-made 11-inch Duo-Servo brakes. A new, more luxurious Salon four-door hardtop was added midway through the model year as a trim package in the U.S. Engine output was 340 hp (254 kW) and the wheelbase was 122 in (3,100 mm).

Chrysler sales increased in 1963 due to introducing a five-year/50,000-mile warranty, a business practice unmatched by its competitors in the 1960s.

Changes for the 1964 model year included a new grille, a larger rear window, and small tailfins giving the car a boxier look from the side. Canadians were given the choice of a new two-door hardtop, while Americans continued with the Salon option for the four-door pillarless hardtop. A convertible body style was no longer offered.

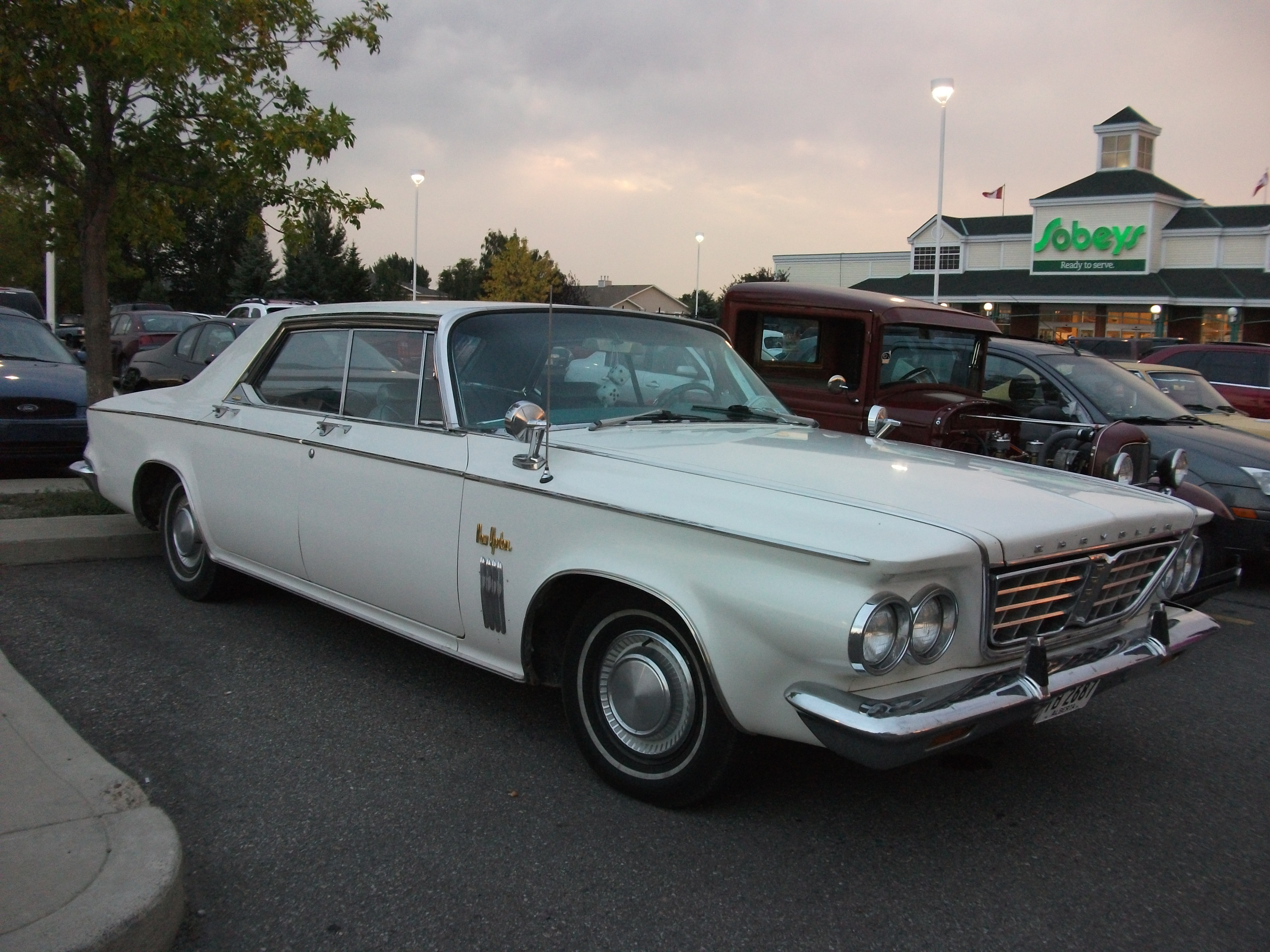
1963 New Yorker 4-door hardtop

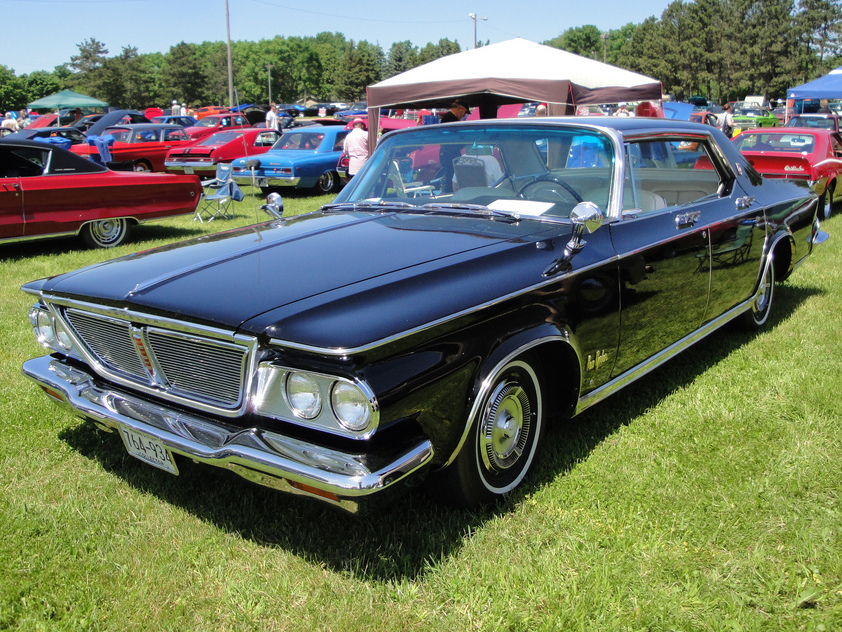
1964 New Yorker 4-door hardtop

== 1965–1968 ==
Series AC3-H / BC3-H / CC3-H / DC3-H
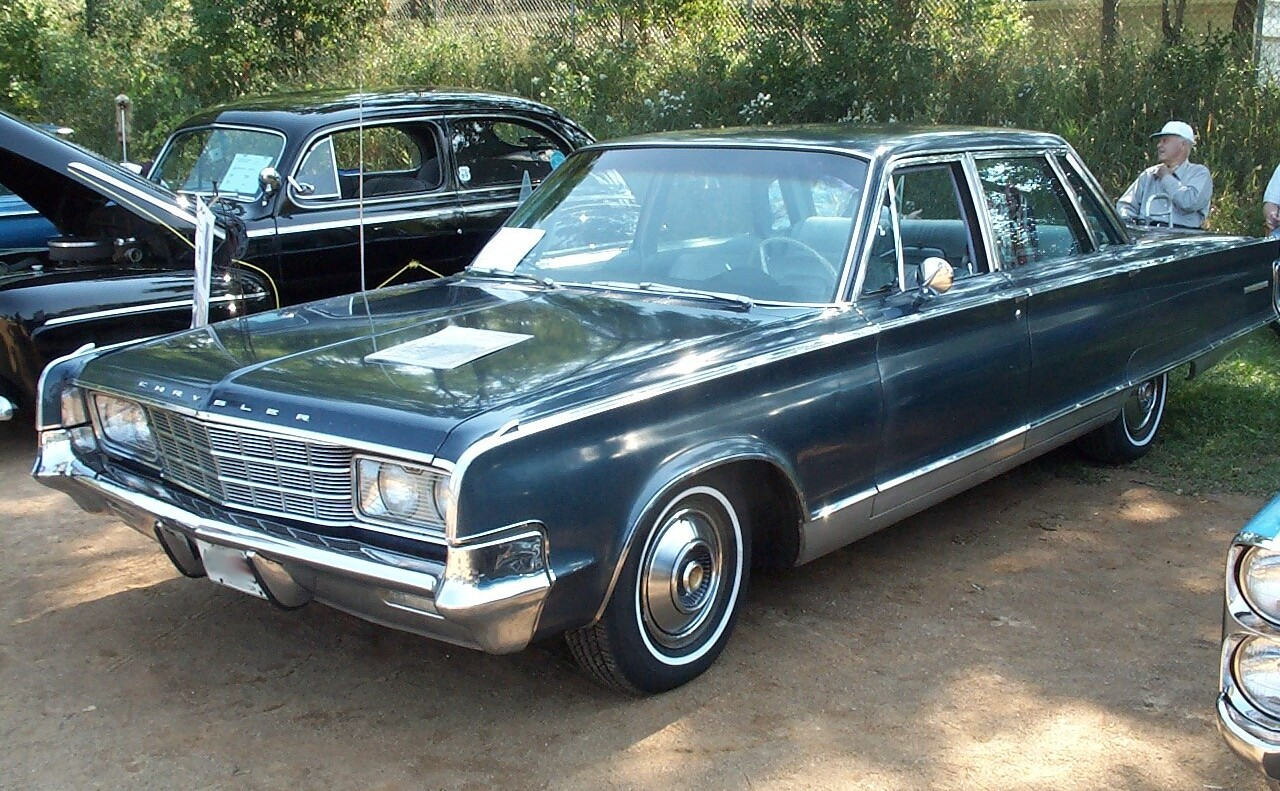
- 1965 New Yorker 4-door Town Sedan (6-window)

Overview
- Model years: 1965–1968
- Assembly: United States: Detroit, Michigan (Jefferson Avenue Assembly); United States: Belvidere, Illinois (Belvidere Assembly Plant)

Body and chassis
- Body style: 4-door sedan; 2-door hardtop; 4-door hardtop; 4-door station wagon
- Layout: FR layout
- Platform: C-body
- Related: Imperial; Chrysler 300L coupe Chrysler 300 (four-door hardtop); Chrysler Town & Country; Chrysler Newport; Dodge Monaco; Dodge Polara; Plymouth Fury

Powertrain
- Engine: 413 cu in (6.8 L) RB V8 (1965); 440 cu in (7.2 L) RB V8 (1966–1968)
- Transmission: 3-speed TorqueFlite automatic

Dimensions
- Wheelbase: 124.0 in (3,150 mm)
- Length: 218.2 in (5,542 mm)

All 1965 Chryslers (as well as full-sized Plymouth and Dodge models) were built on a new C-body unibody platform that featured a bolt-on, rubber-isolated front subframe. Elwood Engel designed the 1965 New Yorker (and all Chrysler models) with styling cues from his 1961 Lincoln Continental — slab sides with chrome trim along the top edges of the fenders. The styling began to share some visual similarities with Chrysler's premium luxury sedan, the Imperial, which received a redesign in 1964.

The standard engine was a 340 hp (254 kW; 345 PS) Firepower 413 cu in (6.8 L) V8, with a single four-barrel carburetion. Optional was the 360 hp (268 kW; 365 PS) 413 from that year's Chrysler letter cars, which came with an unsilenced air cleaner, dual breaker ignition, special camshaft, and dual exhaust. The three-speed TorqueFlite automatic transmission was standard. 1965 was the last year for the 413, before it was replaced in 1966 by the new 440.

The 1965 New Yorker was offered as a four-door sedan, two- and four-door hardtop, and as a Town & Country in two- or three-row station wagon configurations. The four-door sedan was a six-window Town Sedan, also available in the Newport line and Dodge Custom 880 4-door Sedan. A four-door, four-window sedan was produced, but not offered in the New Yorker line. The two-door hardtop was marketed in the United States. While the 300 and Newport two-door hardtops shared a rounded, convertible-styled roof, the New Yorker had a unique roofline resembling the four-door hardtops. A padded vinyl covering on the parallelogram-shaped rear pillar highlighted the more formal and squared-off lines. The wheelbase of the New Yorker models, except the wagon, was 124.0 in (3,150 mm). The Town & Country wagon was on the Dodge's 121 in (3,100 mm) wheelbase as all C-body wagons shared the same basic body. Factory options for 1965 included a vinyl rear roof pillar insert, Saginaw-sourced Tilt 'N Telescopic steering wheel, air conditioning, and power options (windows, antenna, and steering).

The 1965 Chrysler sales increased nearly 40% compared to 1963, to 204,002. 49,871 were New Yorkers, a 62% increase over 1964.

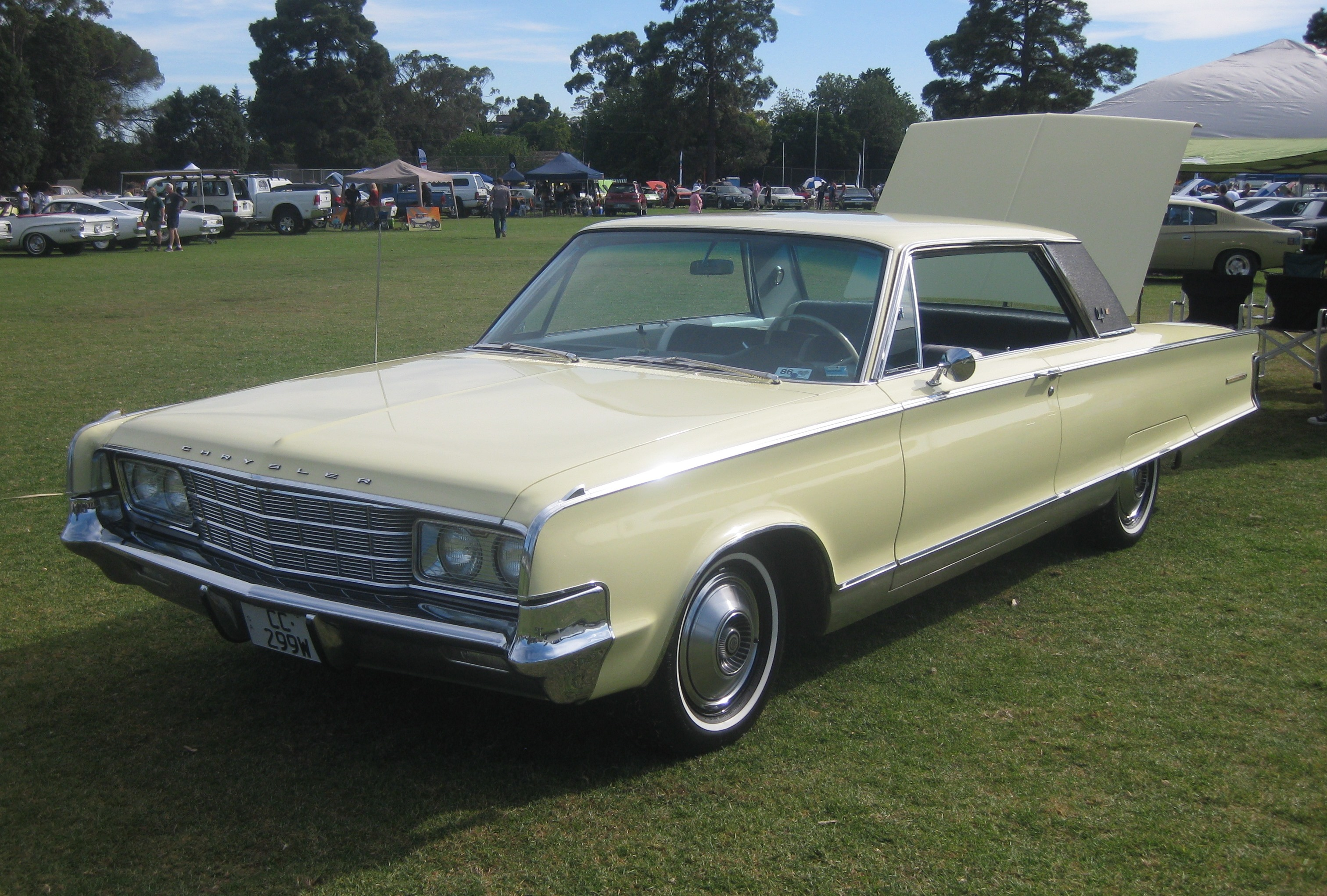
1965 New Yorker 2-door Hardtop

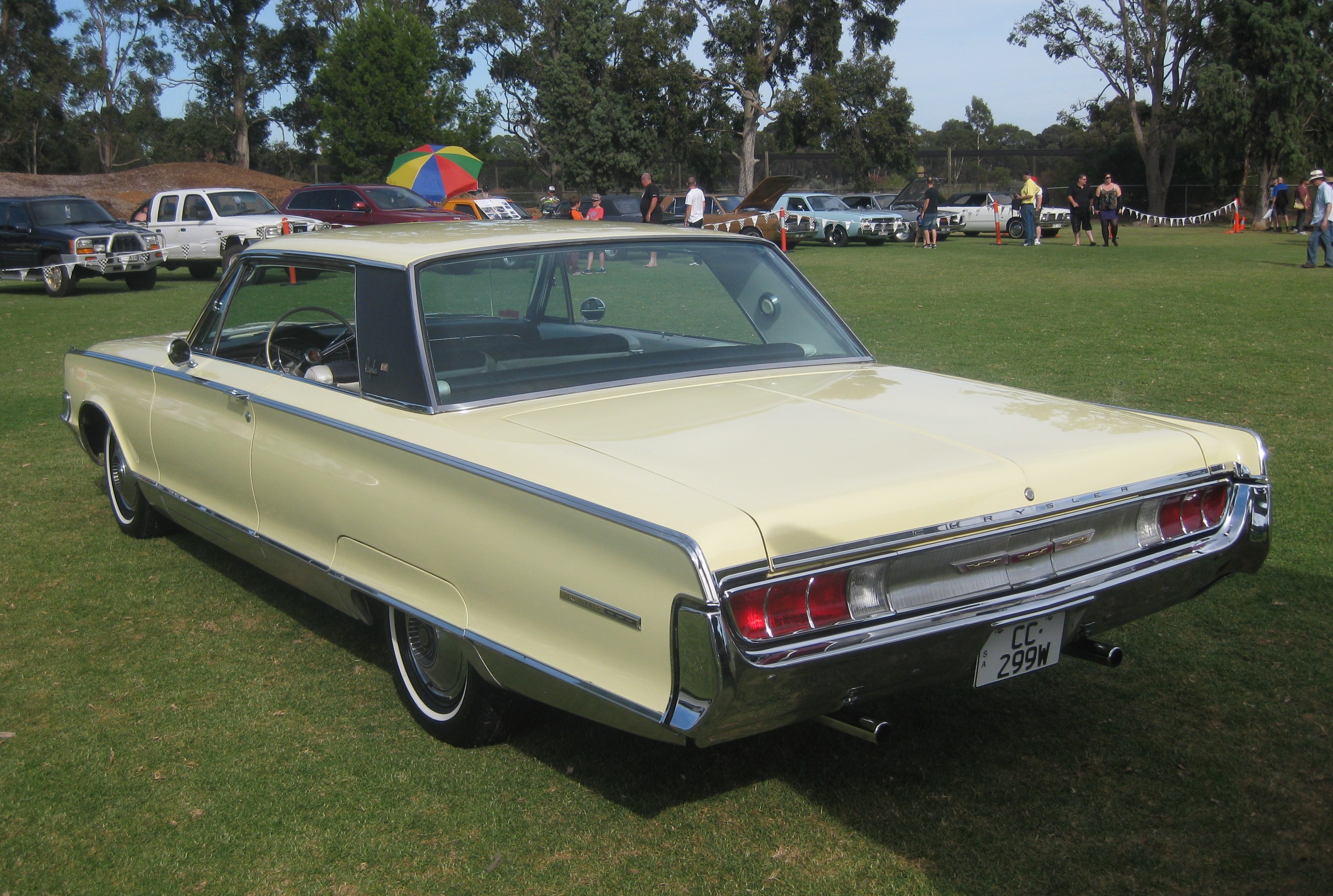
1965 New Yorker 2-door Hardtop

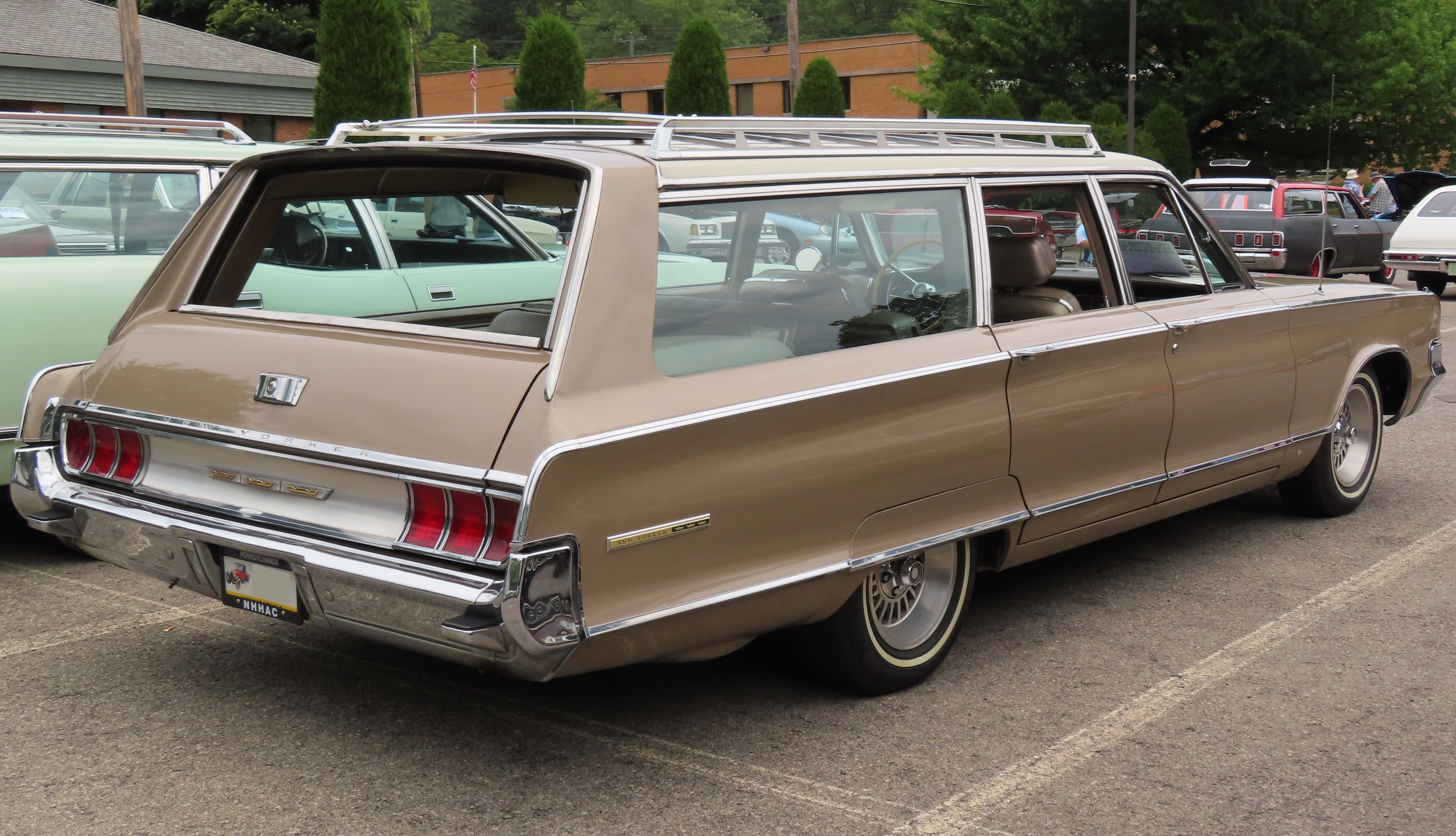
1965 New Yorker wagon, the final year for a New Yorker station wagon

Styling for the 1966 model year was an evolution of the 1965 themes. Changes included a new grille, tail lamps, and revised side trim. The biggest news was the adoption of the new Firepower 440 V8 engine. In standard form, it produced 350 hp (261 kW; 355 PS); the optional, high-performance 440 TNT 365 hp (272 kW; 370 PS) included a twin snorkel, silenced air cleaner, and dual exhausts. The New Yorker lineup no longer offered a station wagon body style for 1966, as the Town & Country wagon was now marketed as a series on its own. The four-door, six-window Town Sedan and two- and four-door hardtop body styles were continued.

Although 1966 was another successful sales year for the Chrysler division overall with a nearly 29% increase in production and sales of 262,495, New Yorker numbers were down to 47,579.

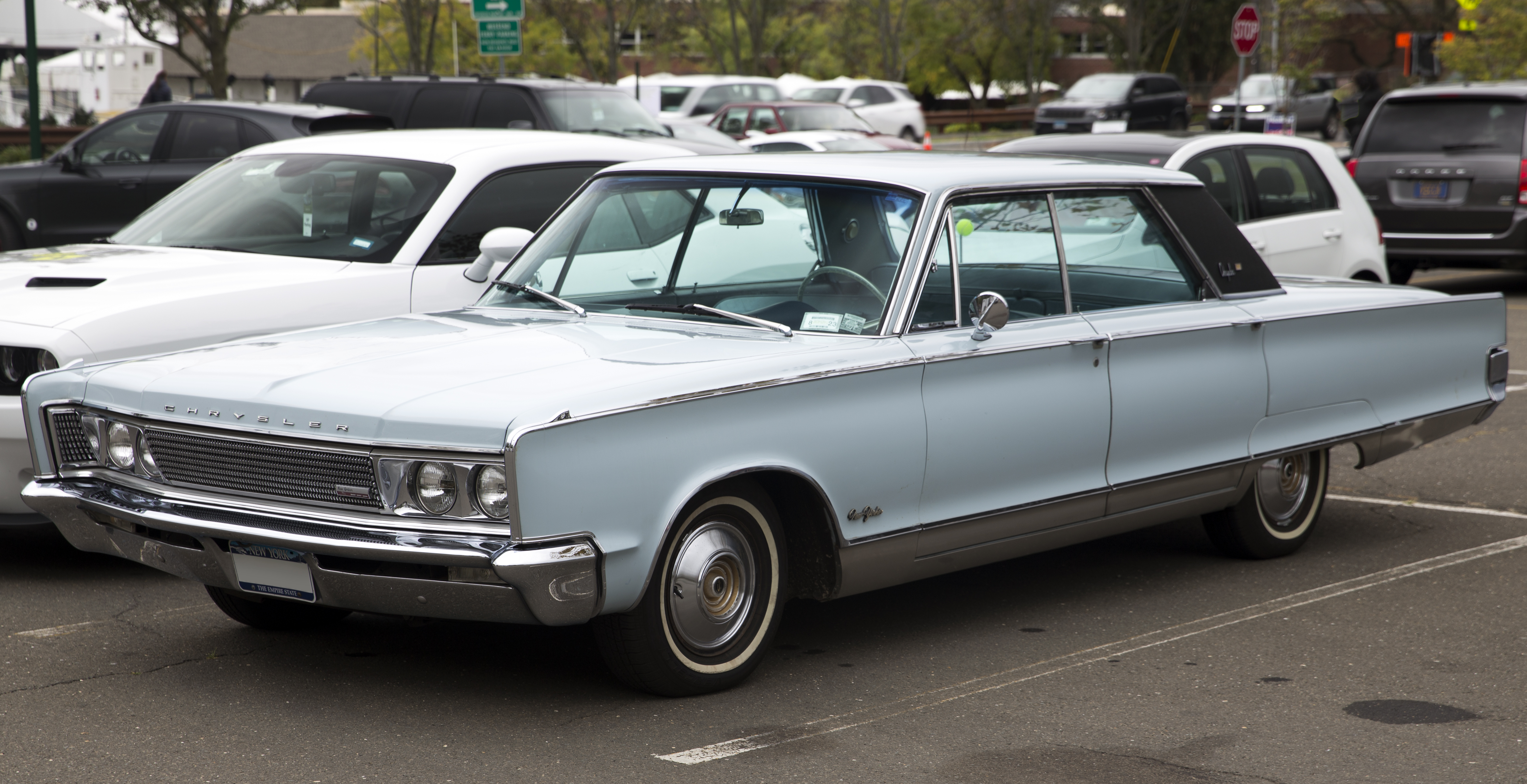
1966 New Yorker 4-door Hardtop

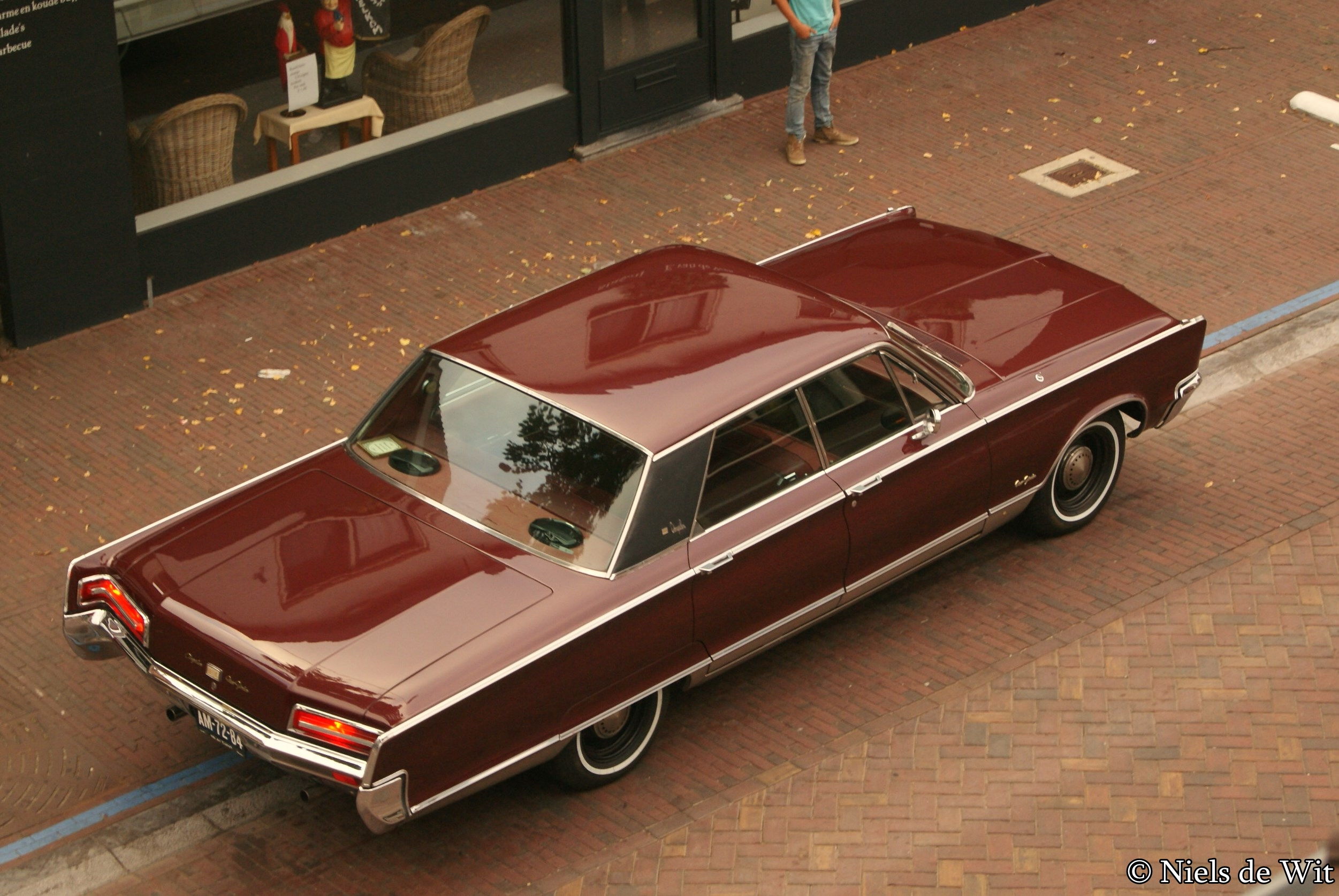
1966 New Yorker 4-door Hardtop

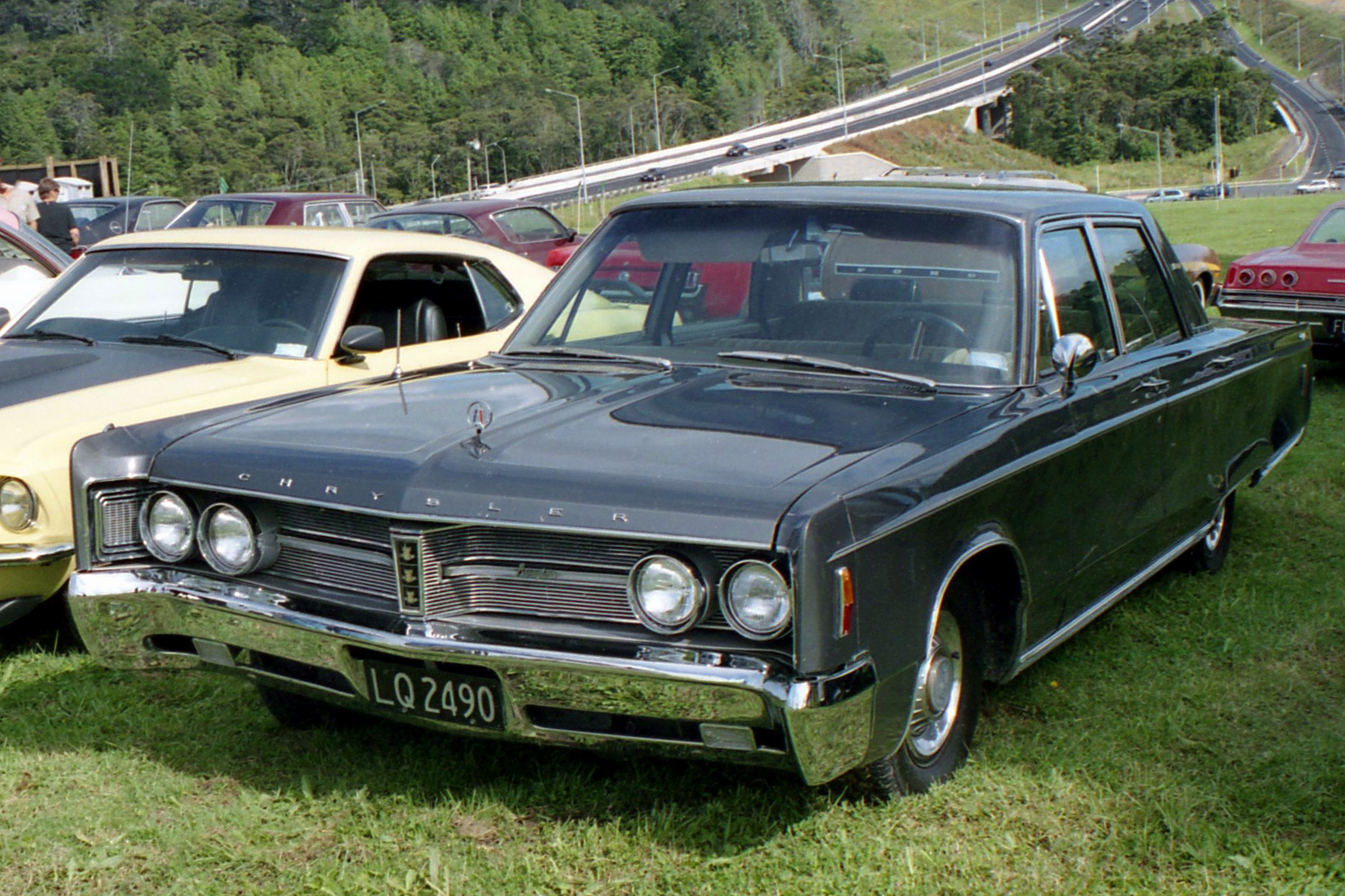
1967 New Yorker 4-door Sedan

Chrysler completely redesigned sheet metal below the beltline for the 1967 model year. New styling features were wraparound parking lights at the front and taillights at the rear. A new "fasttop" design for the two-door hardtop replaced the more formal look of the 1965 and 1966 designs. The four-door sedan reverted to the four-window style as used on the Newport line. Sales fell 20%, the company's lowest in five years, due to an economic slump that year.

Styling changes for 1968 included a new grille, bumpers, front sheet metal, rear fenders, and rear deck. Although the Newport and 300 four-door hardtops received a new, sportier roofline shared with Dodge and Plymouth, the New Yorker continued with the roofline introduced in 1965. The main exterior features distinguishing the New Yorker from the other Chrysler lines were a full-width grille with a rectangular pattern, repeated at the rear by the full-width deck trim, and continuous lower bodyside molding.

Chrysler production rebounded with this year, setting a record at 264,863 cars built. 48,143 were New Yorkers, a slight improvement over the 1966 level.

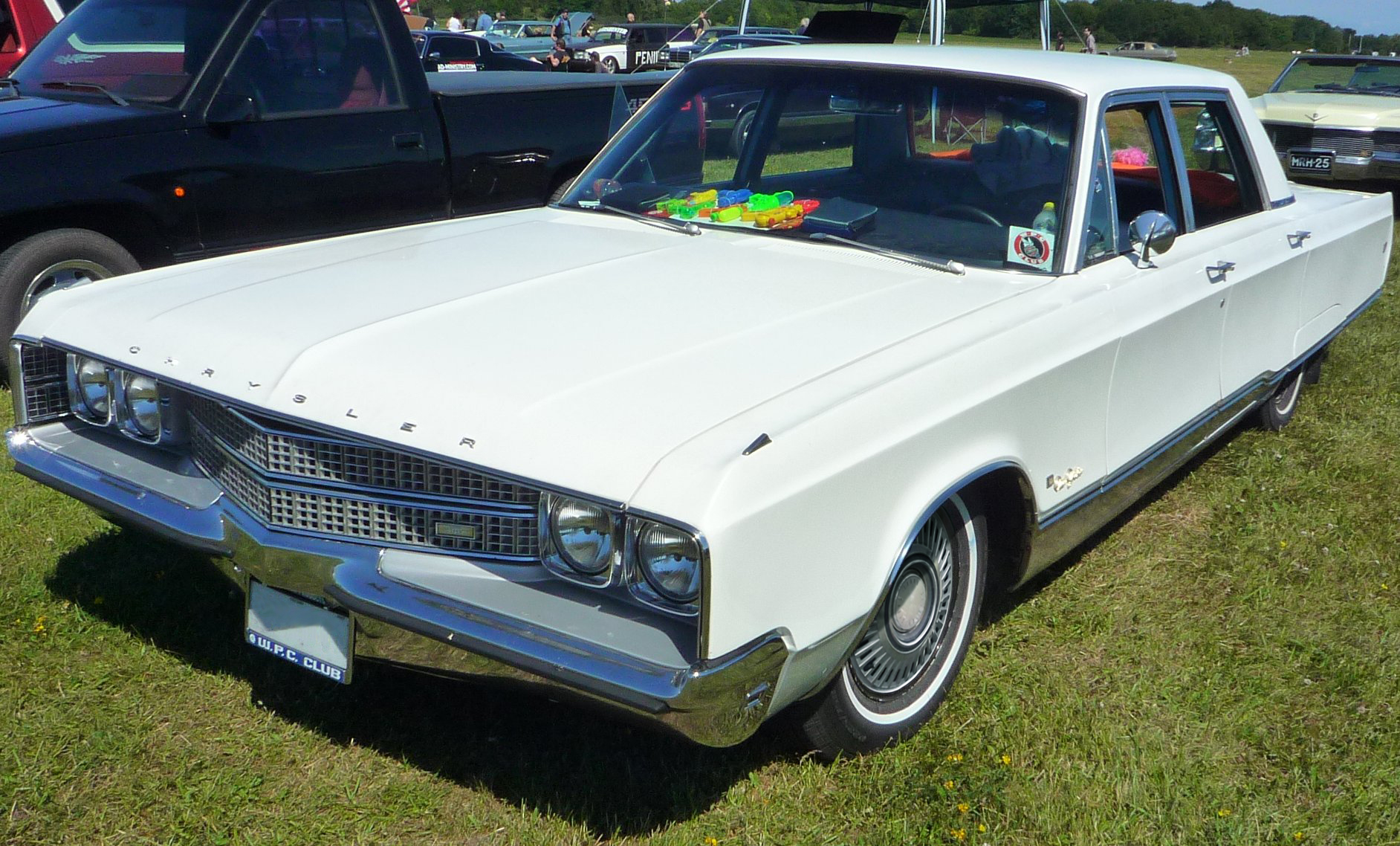
1968 New Yorker 4-door Sedan

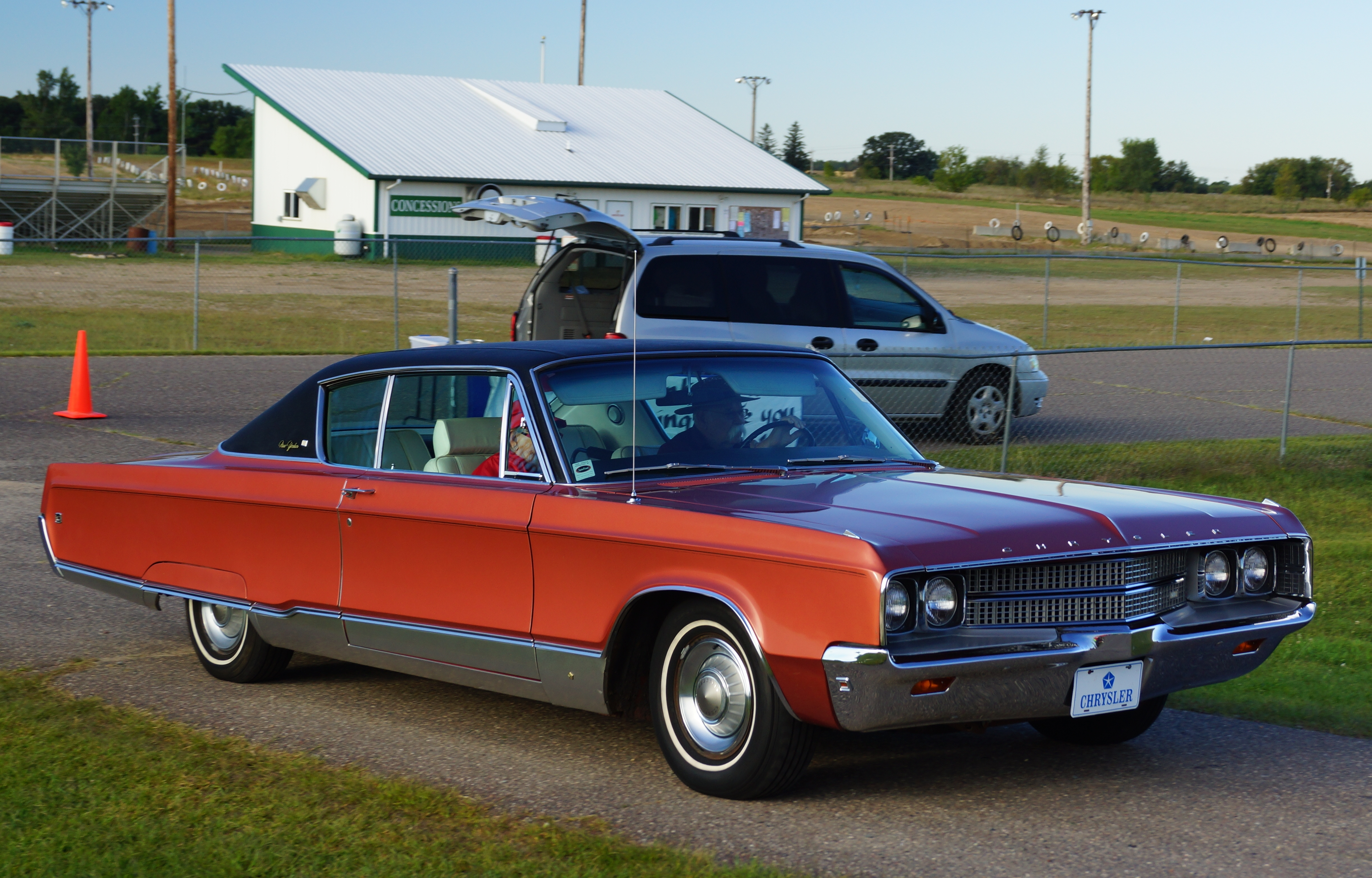
1968 New Yorker 2-door Hardtop

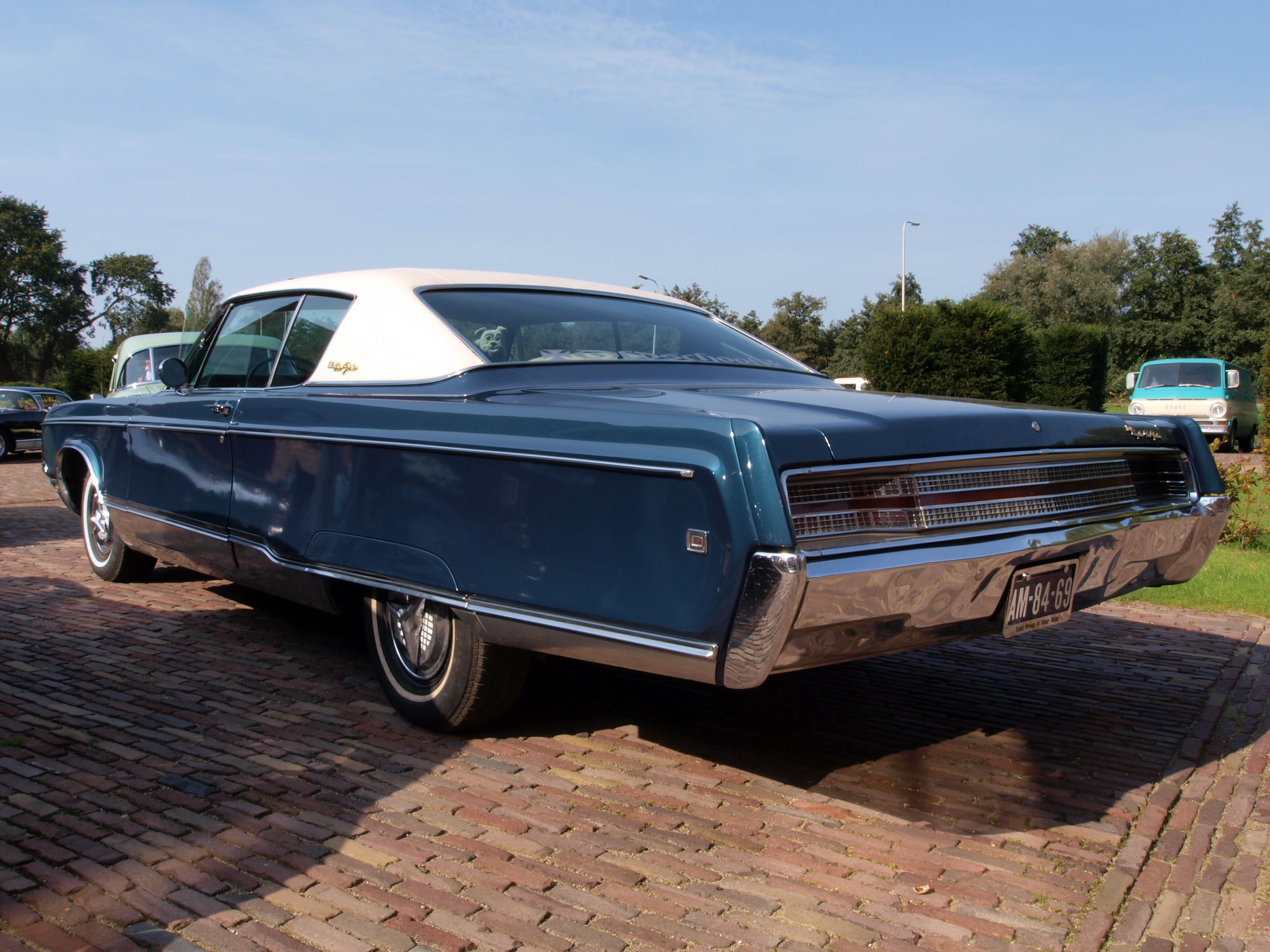
1968 New Yorker 2-door Hardtop

== 1969–1973 ==
Series EC-H / FC-H / GC-H / HC-H / 3C-H
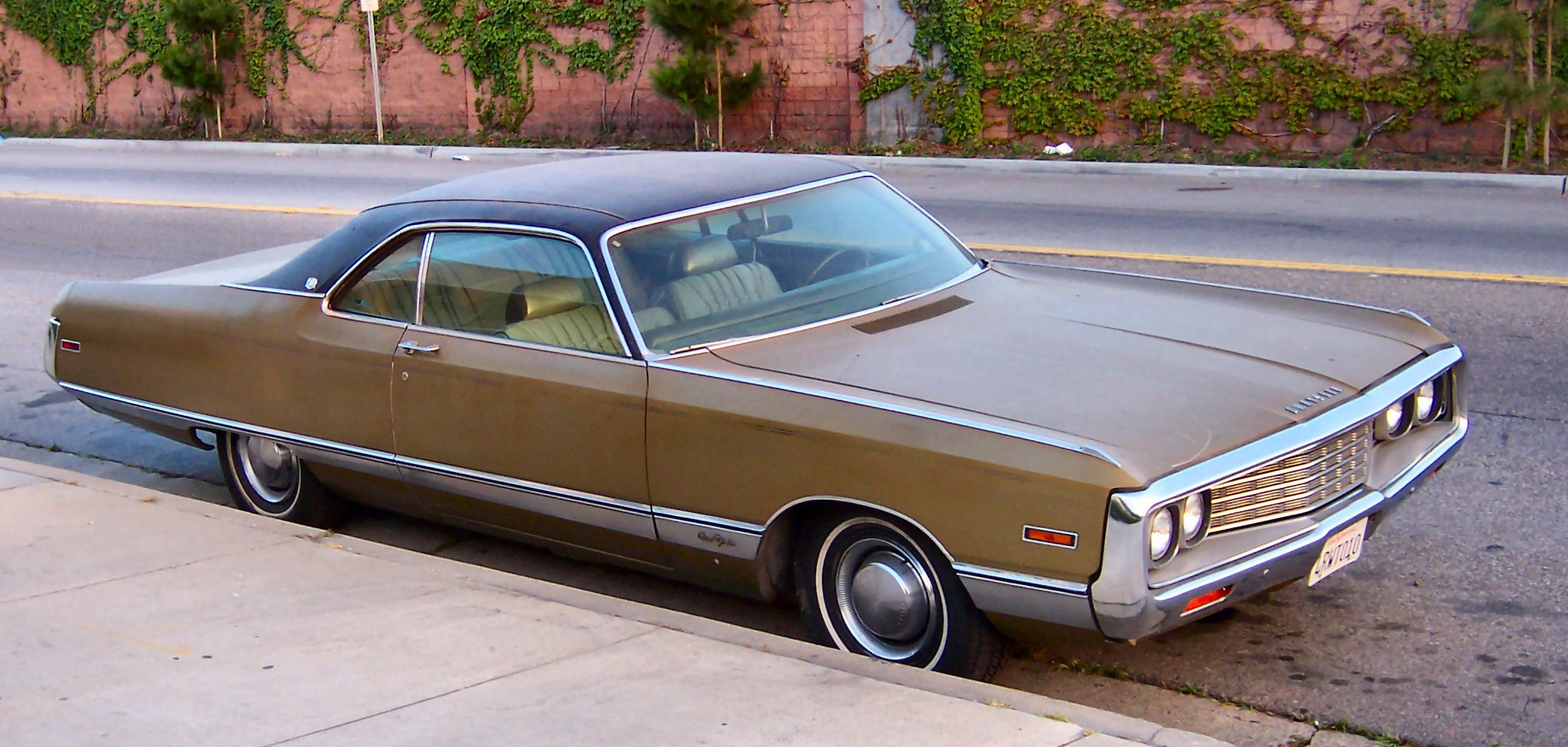
- 1970 New Yorker two-door hardtop

Overview
- Model years: 1969–1973
- Assembly: United States: Detroit, Michigan (Jefferson Avenue Assembly); United States: Belvidere, Illinois (Belvidere Assembly Plant)

Body and chassis
- Body style: 2-door hardtop 4-door sedan 4-door hardtop
- Layout: FR layout
- Platform: C-body
- Related: Imperial Le Baron; Imperial Crown; Chrysler 300; Chrysler Town & Country; Chrysler Newport; Dodge Monaco; Dodge Polara; Plymouth Fury

Powertrain
- Engine: 440 cu in (7.2 L) RB V8
- Transmission: 3-speed A-727 automatic

Dimensions
- Wheelbase: 124.0 in (3,150 mm)
- Length: 224.7 in (5,707 mm)

Introduced in August 1968, the 1969 full-size Chryslers featured a new "fuselage" styling shared with all C-body cars, including the completely restyled Imperial. Although the previous generation's platform continued, the "fuselage" styling was a major reworking. It featured plain curved smooth sides with a higher beltline. Distinguishing the full-size cars were details at the front and rear that had rectangular-frame bumpers, as well as different taillamps. However, the high beltline and fenders provided a bulky look because there was no beltline shoulder, resulting in a large expanse of rear quarter panel. This was most evident in the two-door hardtop model where the "greenhouse looked turret-topped". The two-door hardtop's new look was harking back to the club coupes of the 1940s.

The 1970 Chryslers received minor styling changes to the grille, taillamps, and trim. The small vent windows on the front doors were dropped on the two-door hardtops.

Due to lower-than-expected sales, the facelift scheduled for 1971 was delayed until 1972. Thus, the 1971 models only received new grilles and taillamps. Ventless front-door windows on the four-door sedan and hardtop were new this year. A new "Torsion-Quiet" system was introduced which added rubber cushions and blocks to isolate the suspension.

The 1972 model year engine output ratings dropped to meet stricter emissions standards and rising gas prices. Chryslers received a new "split grille" similar to the 1971–1974 Dodge Chargers. This would be the last year for the "loop"-style front bumpers on Chryslers.

The "fuselage" styling continued through the 1973 model year. However, the massive loop bumper was replaced with a new squared-off front end featuring a new bumper with rubber-faced guards to withstand the new 5-mph collision standards. The four-door hardtop was the best-seller for 1973, with 26,635 made, followed by the two-door hardtop with 9,190, and 8,541 four-door sedans.

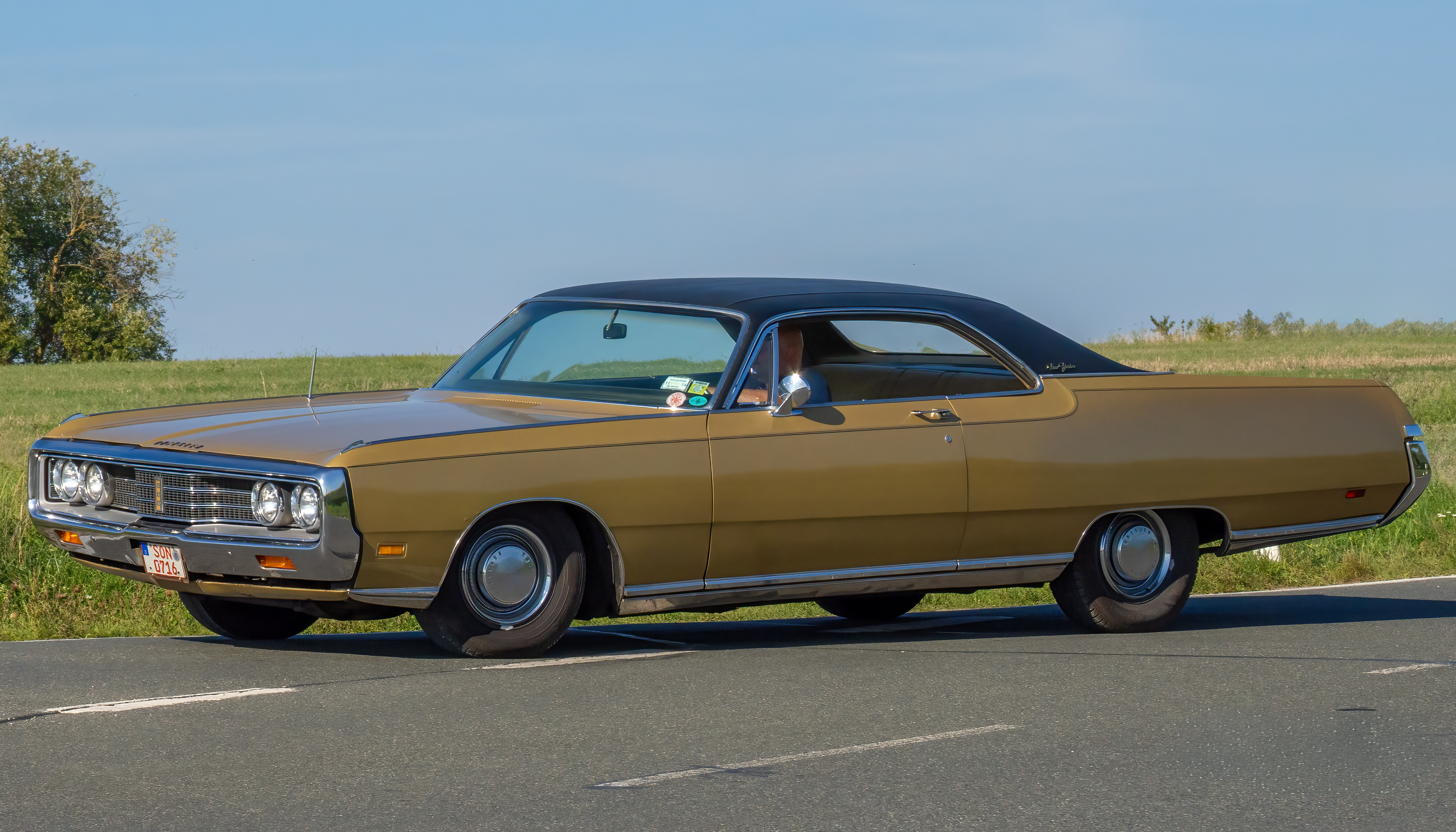
1969 New Yorker 2-Door Hardtop

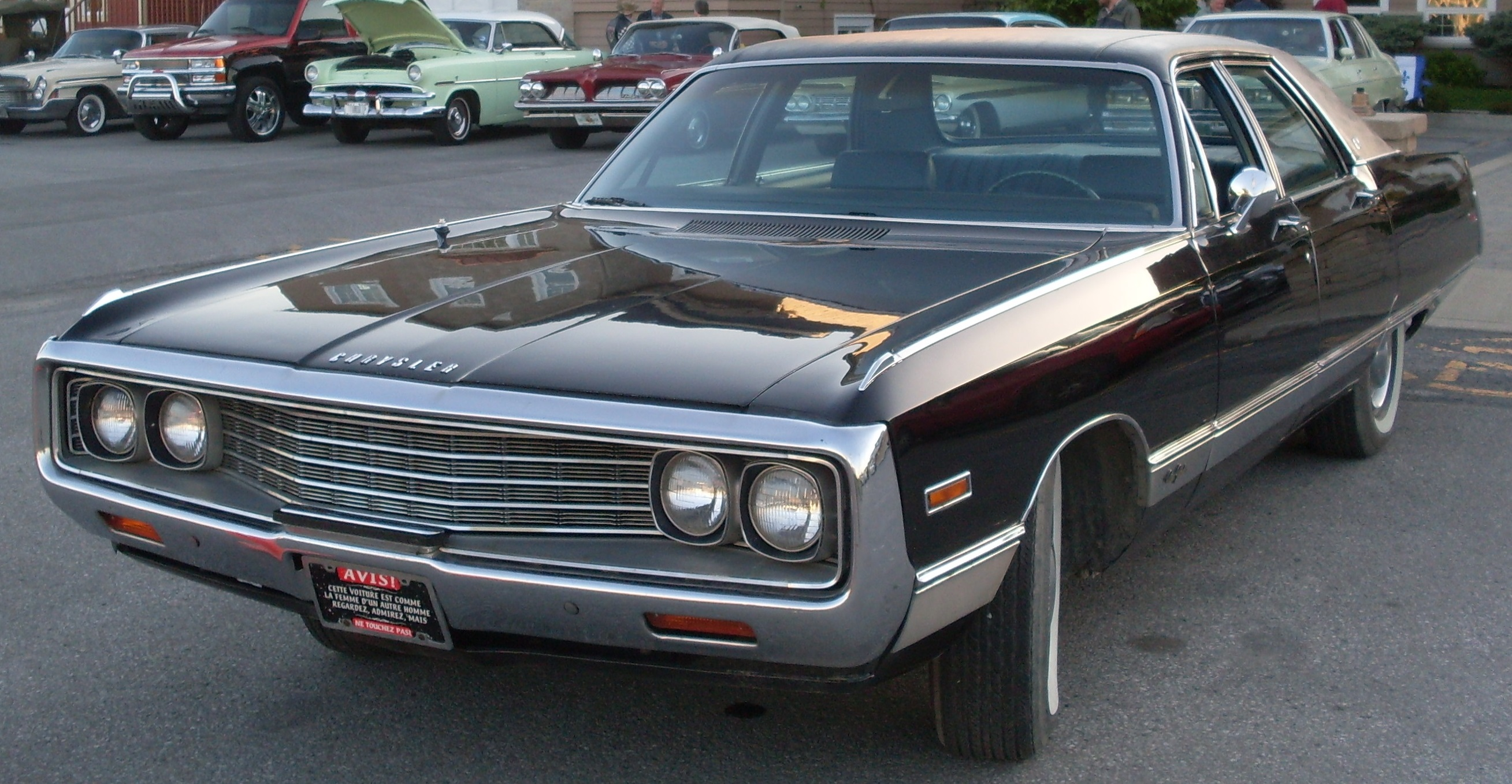
1970 New Yorker 4-Door Sedan

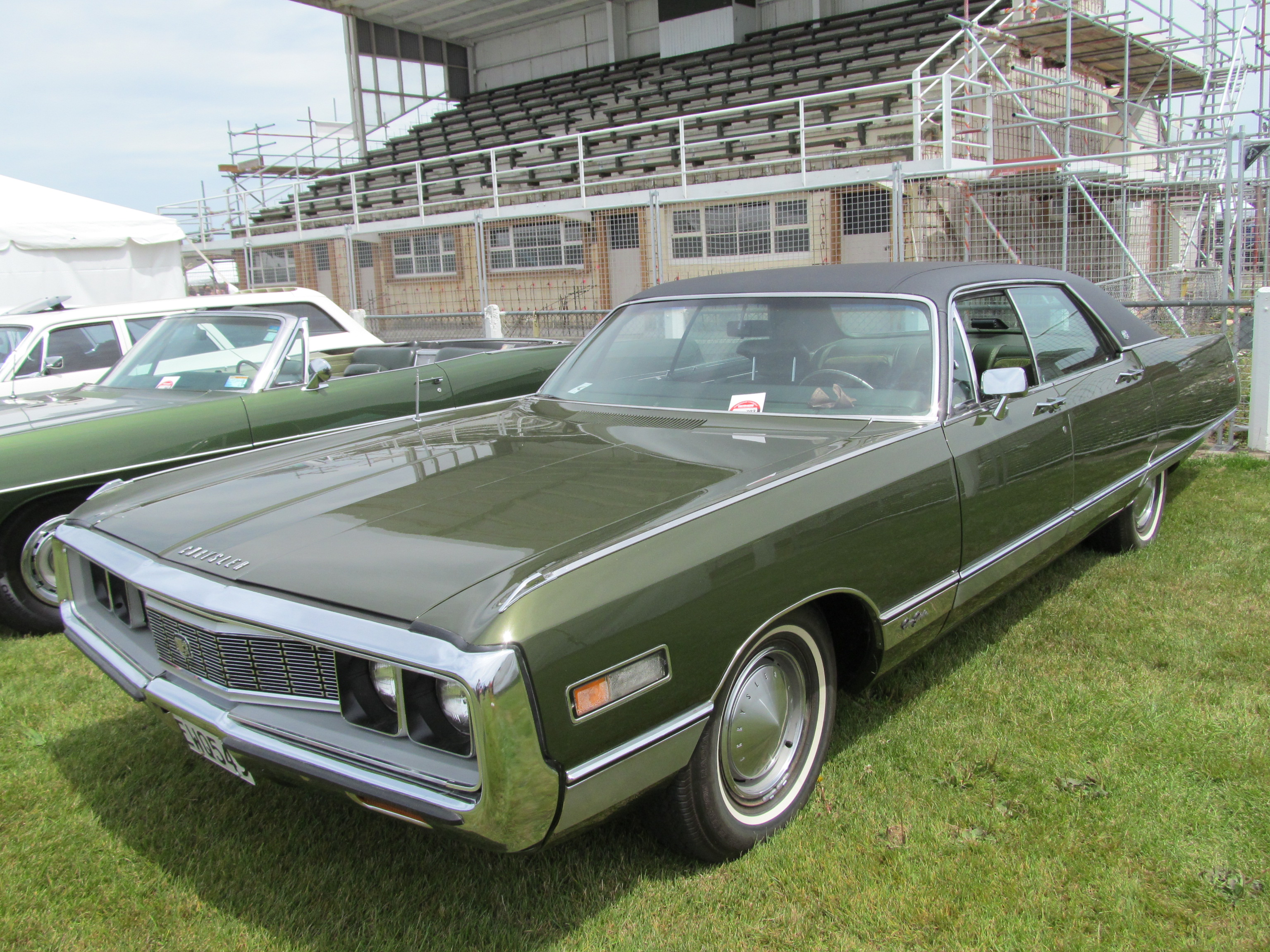
1971 New Yorker 4-Door Hardtop

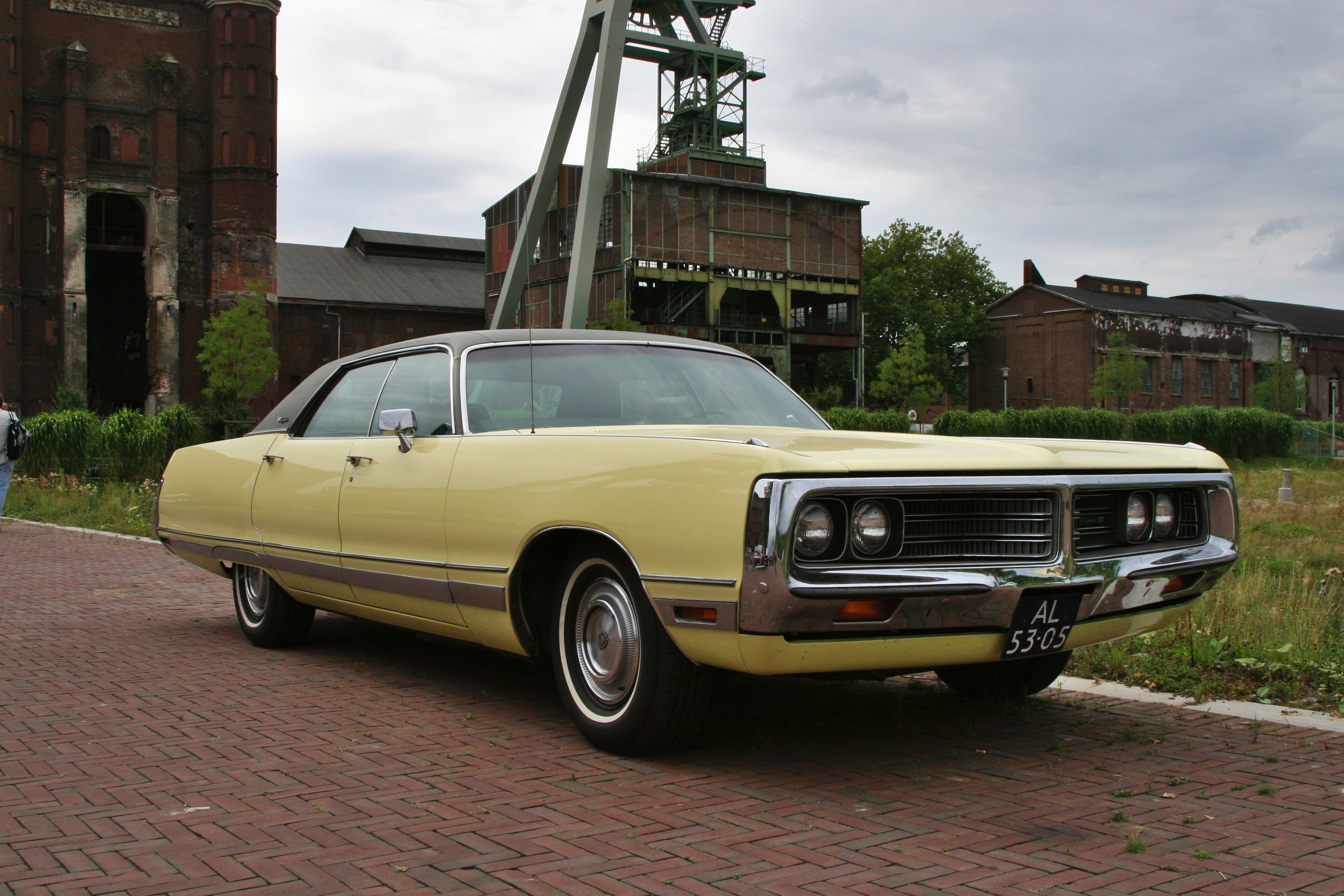
1972 New Yorker Brougham 4-Door Hardtop

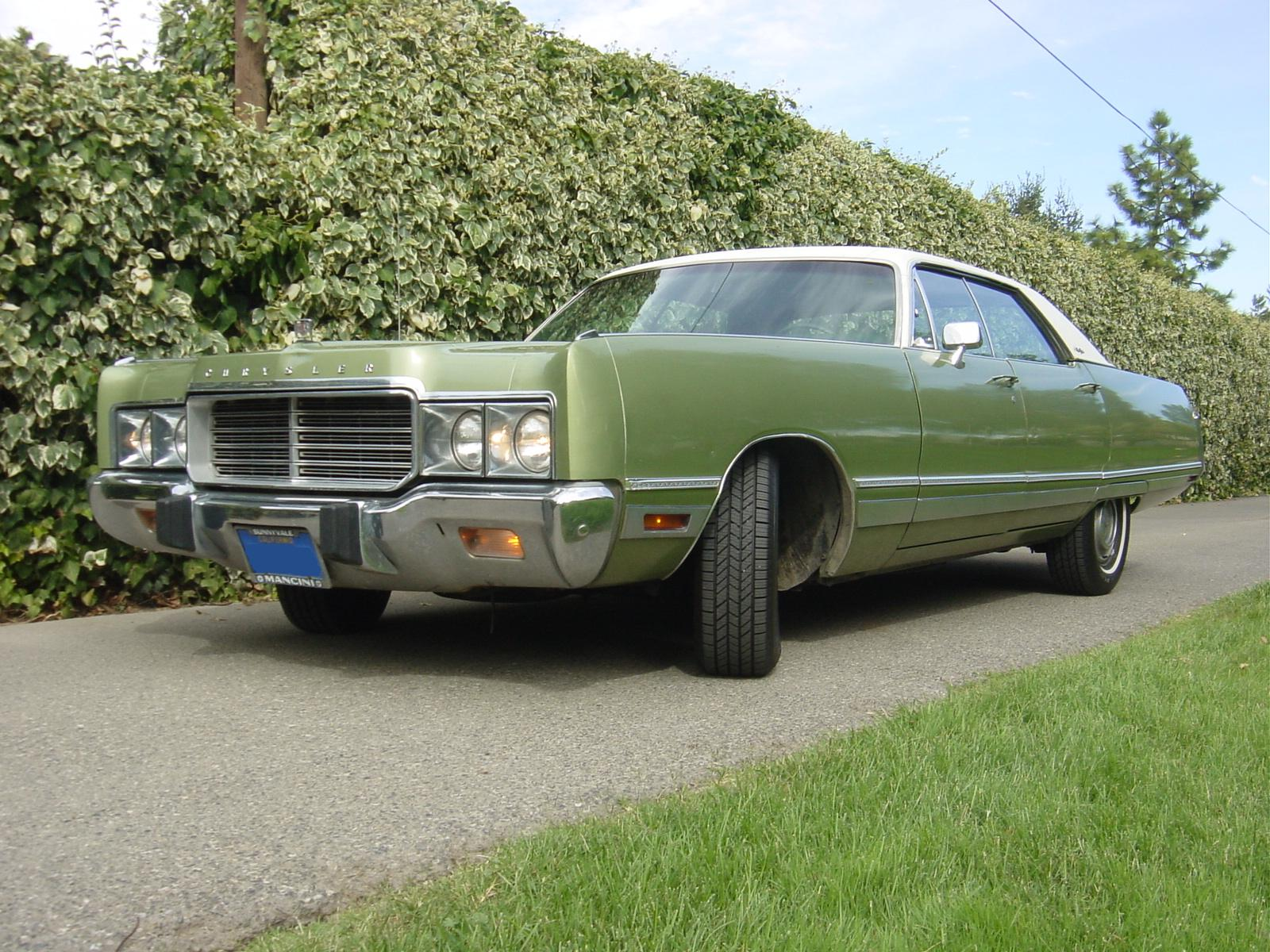
1973 New Yorker 4-door hardtop

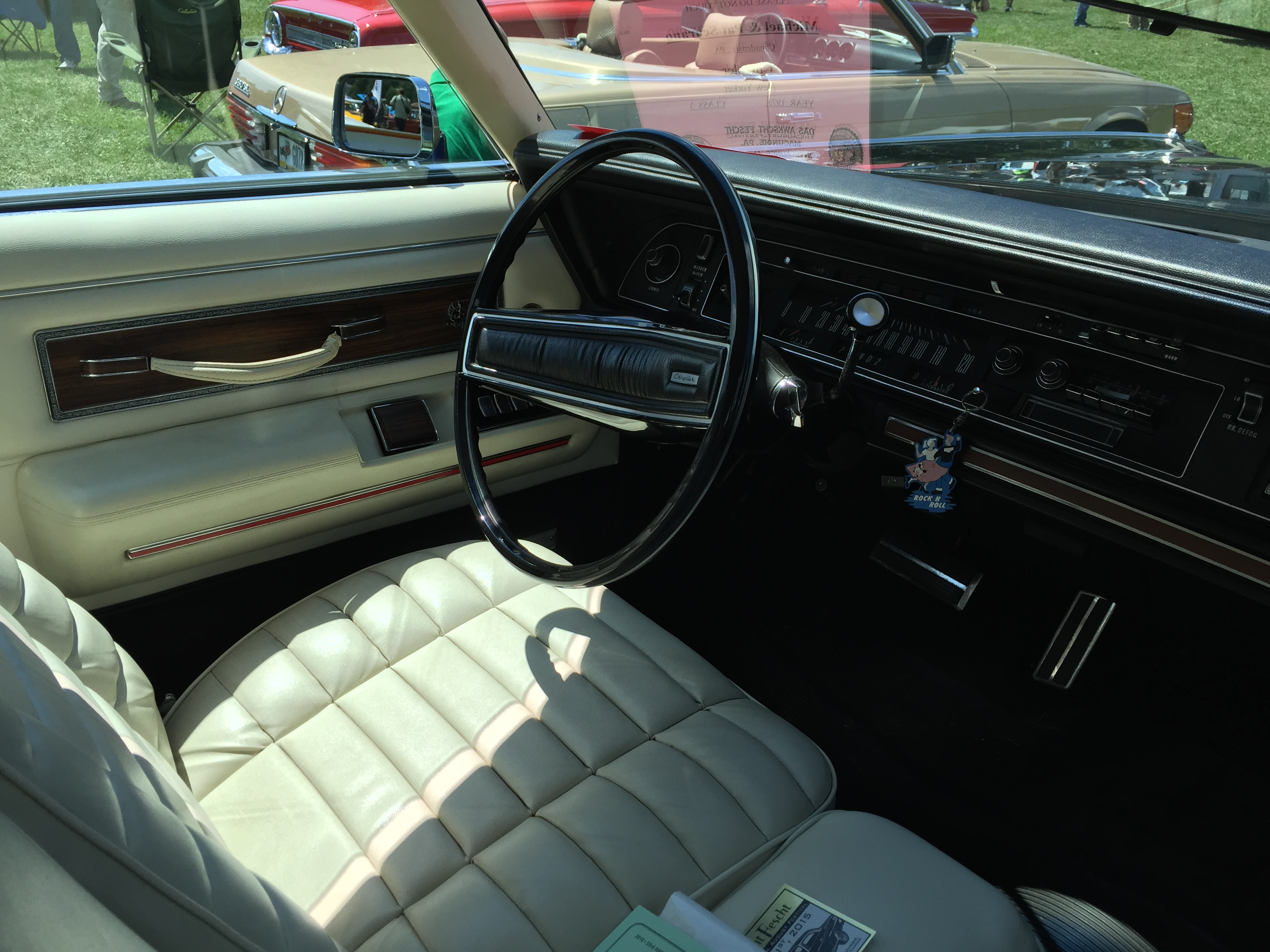
1973 New Yorker interior

== 1974–1978 ==
Series 4C / 5C / CS
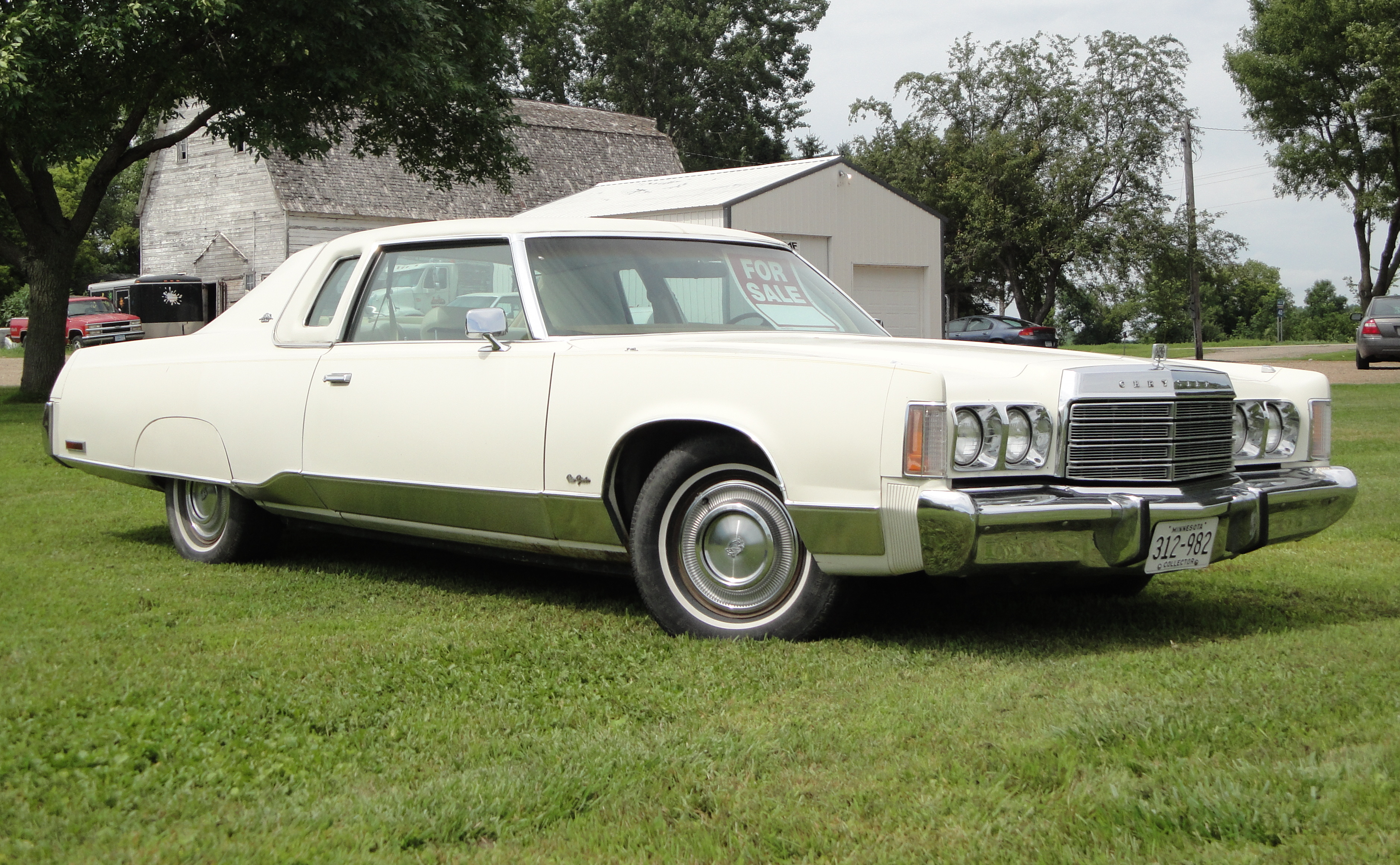
- 1974 New Yorker Brougham 2-door hardtop with St. Regis option package

Overview
- Model years: 1974–1978
- Assembly: United States: Detroit, Michigan (Jefferson Avenue Assembly); United States: Belvidere, Illinois (Belvidere Assembly Plant)

Body and chassis
- Body style: 2-door coupe 2-door hardtop 4-door sedan 4-door hardtop
- Layout: FR layout
- Platform: C-body
- Related: Imperial; Chrysler Town & Country; Chrysler Newport; Dodge Monaco; Plymouth Fury; Plymouth Gran Fury

Powertrain
- Engine: 440 cu in (7.2 L) Wedge V8; 400 cu in (6.6 L) Wedge V8; 360 cu in (5.9 L) Chrysler LA V8

Dimensions
- Wheelbase: 124.0 in (3,150 mm)
- Length: 232.7 in (5,911 mm)
- Width: 79.5 in (2,019 mm)
- Height: 54.5 in (1,384 mm)
- Curb weight: 4,832 lb (2,192 kg)

Chronology
- Successor: Chrysler Fifth Avenue

The 1974 models were the last full-size models Chrysler designed from the ground up. The rounded "fuselage" styling gave way to an even more massive slab-sided body on all full-size Chryslers. This generation utilized popular styling motifs, primarily used on the Lincoln Continental. However, they debuted almost simultaneously with the start of the 1973 OPEC oil embargo, which contributed to Chrysler's economic woes in the late 1970s.

The 1974 New Yorkers emphasized luxury and comfort with roomy interiors, plush upholstery, additional sound insulation, and more standard amenities. Two New Yorker trim levels were offered in 1974: the base New Yorker and an upgraded New Yorker Brougham. The listed retail price for the four-door hardtop sedan was US$6,611 ($43,159 in 2025 dollars) and 13,165 were sold. Midway through the 1974 model year, the St. Regis appearance option package of the mid-1950s returned, offering fixed formal opera windows, body paint accent stripes, and a forward half-covered vinyl covered roof. The 440 cu in (7.2 L) V8 became the standard engine on the New Yorker, replacing the previous 400 cu in (6.6 L) V8. Fuel economy decreased because of the larger engine and the car's heavier weight.

The 1975 New Yorkers were largely a carryover. They received a slightly revised grille, and New Yorker Brougham became the sole trim designation. The St. Regis package, introduced in mid-1974, returned for its first full year.

The 1976 New Yorker inherited the front- and rear-end styling of the discontinued Imperial, including the covered headlights flanking the vertical waterfall split grille topped with a hood ornament. The rear end included vertical taillamps finishing the peaked rear fenders between a massive rear bumper. The Imperial styling gave the New Yorker an unforeseen boost in sales, as the car looked distinctly different from the lower-priced Chrysler Newport. In turn, the styling cues formerly used on the 1974 and 1975 New Yorkers were passed on to the Chrysler Newport Custom, which was positioned between the standard Newport and the New Yorker. The 1976 New Yorker also inherited the Imperial's interior styling. The Chrysler New Yorker Brougham, introduced as an optional trim package in 1974, became the standalone top-of-the-line model for 1976. Brougham offered a higher level of luxury appointments compared to the standard New Yorker. Upgrades included premium upholstery in leather or plush fabrics, enhanced woodgrain interior trim, and additional exterior badging. The standard engine, 400 cu in (6.6 L) V8, included "lean-burn" and was rated at 175 hp (130 kW; 177 PS) and 300 lb⋅ft (407 N⋅m) of torque.

In 1977, the standard 440 cu in (7.2 L) V8 engine was revised to include a new computer-controlled "lean burn" system, allowing for more responsive acceleration and performance, but was aimed to improve fuel efficiency. However, the technology could be problematic and require maintenance. The 440 cu in (7.2 L) V8 was available, rated at 195 hp (145 kW; 198 PS) and 320 lb⋅ft (434 N⋅m) of torque. This was needed for the 4,739 lb (2,150 kg) weight of a typical New Yorker.

The 1978 New Yorker Brougham was available in two-door and four-door hardtop body styles. Both were the last U.S.-built true pillarless hardtop models with frameless door glass and fully opening windows. An optional "St. Regis" package included a partial "formal" padded vinyl roof that had a fixed B-pillar and opera window. This was also the final year a two-door New Yorker was offered. Appearance changes were limited to a new segmented grille design, dual accent tape strips on the lower body sides, new rear deck stripes, and bright accents on the taillamps. The 400 cu in (6.6 L) V8 engine (360 cu in (5.9 L) in California and high altitude regions) became the standard engine, with the 440 cu in (7.2 L) optional. The last year of the C-body New Yorker Broughams saw engineering changes, including a revised windshield wiper linkage bushing, redesigned front and rear plastic fender extensions for the bumpers, and thinner glass.

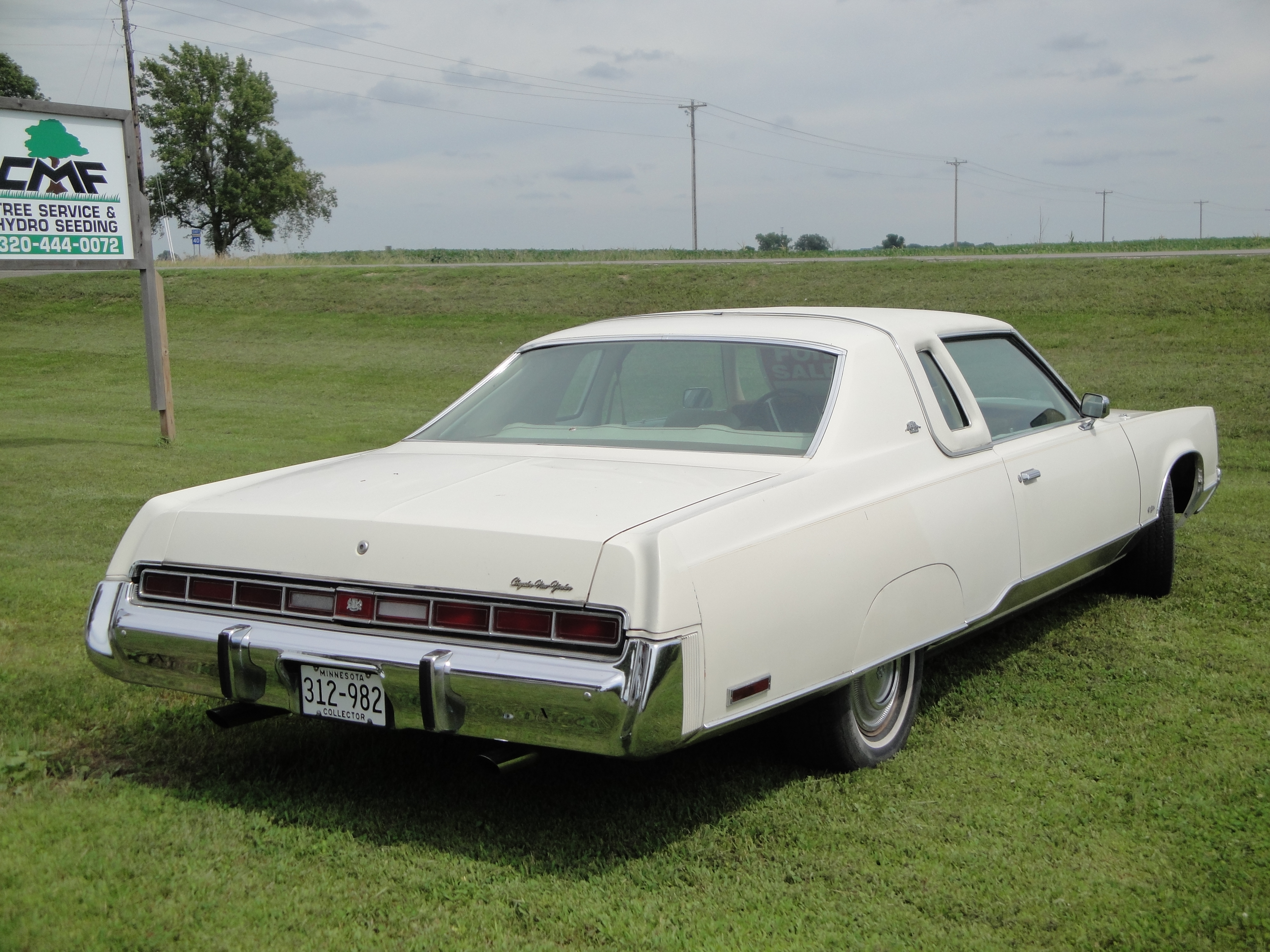
1974 New Yorker Brougham 2-door hardtop with St. Regis option package

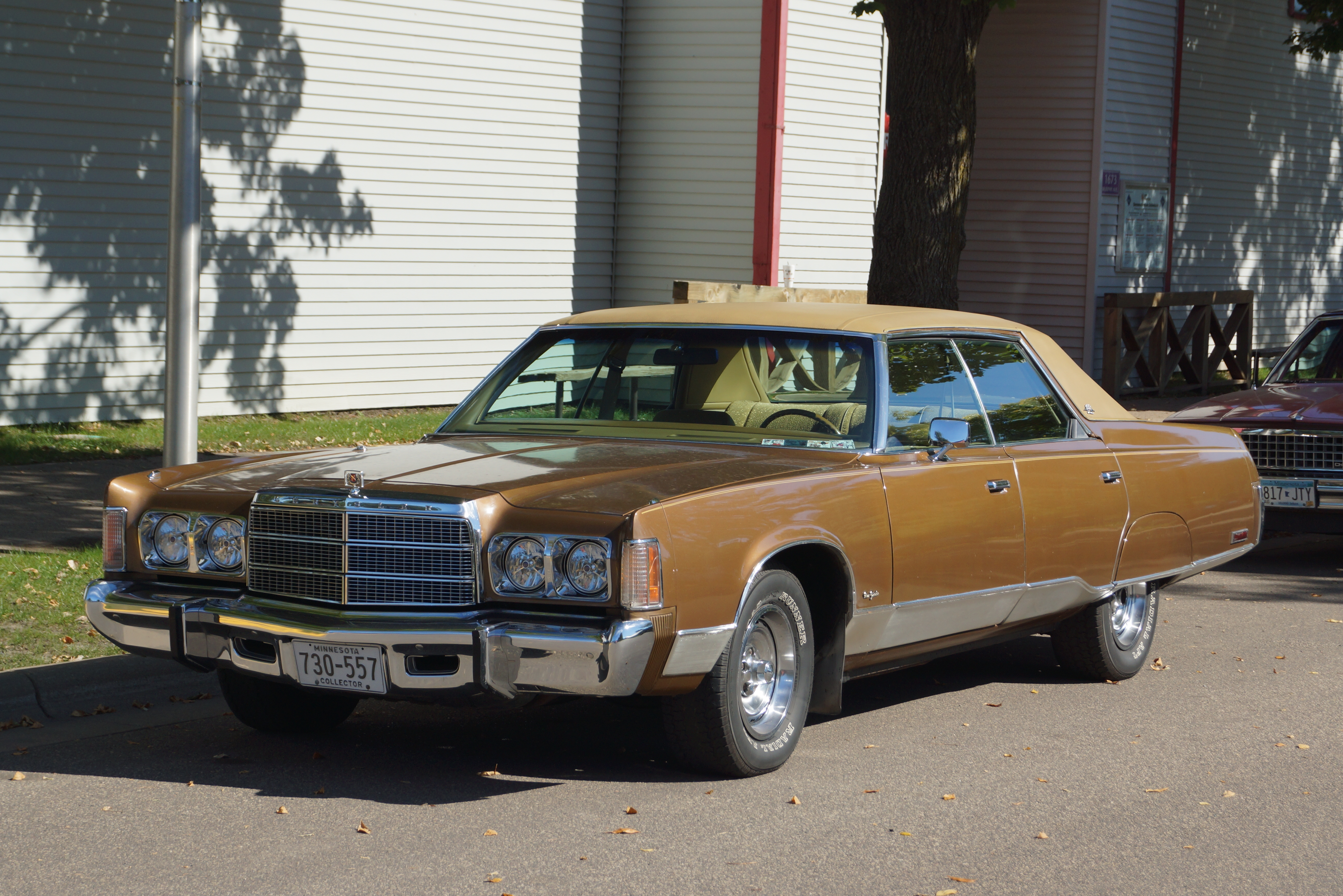
1975 New Yorker Brougham 4-door hardtop (with non-standard wheels)

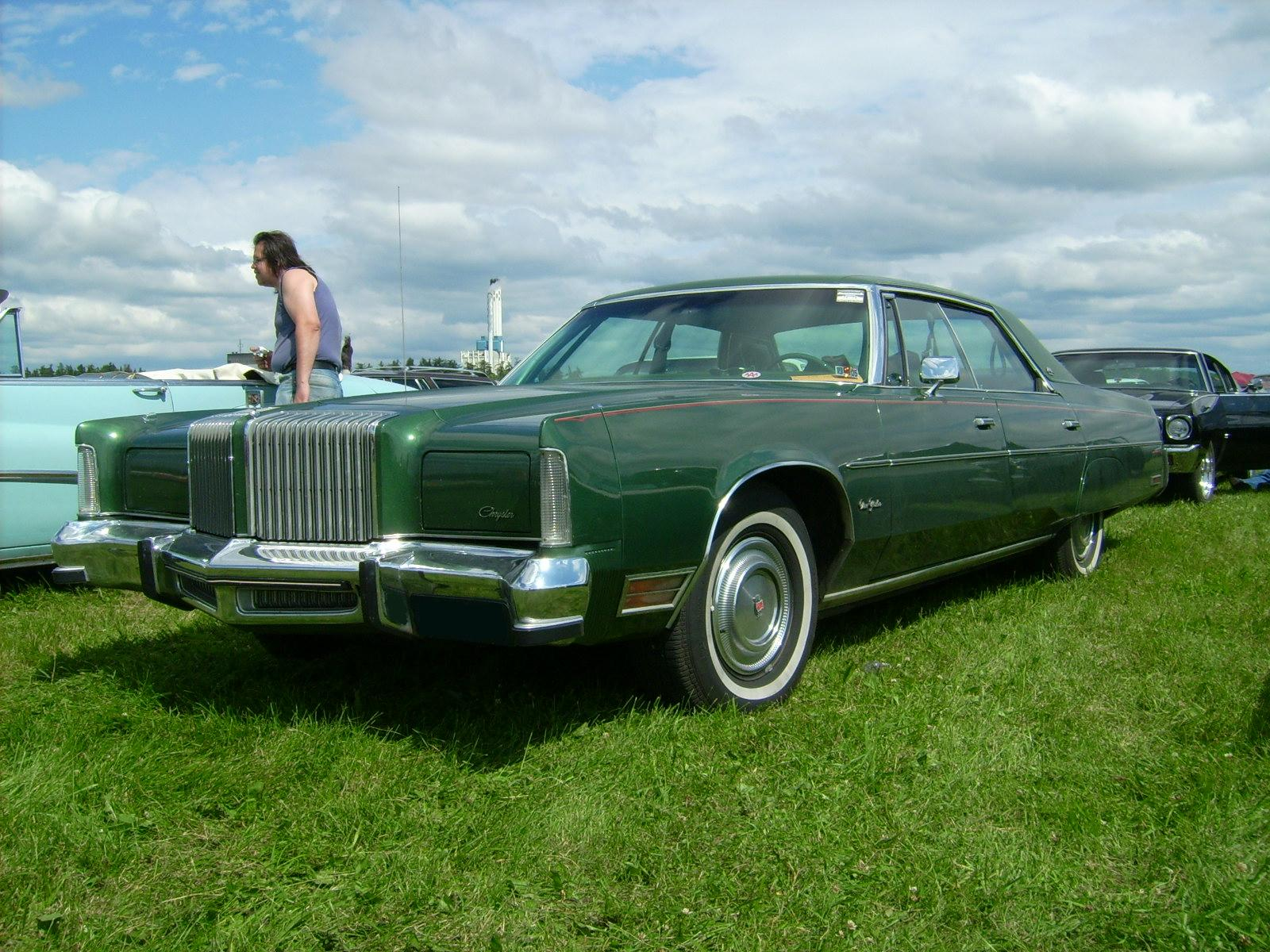
1976 New Yorker Brougham 4-door hardtop

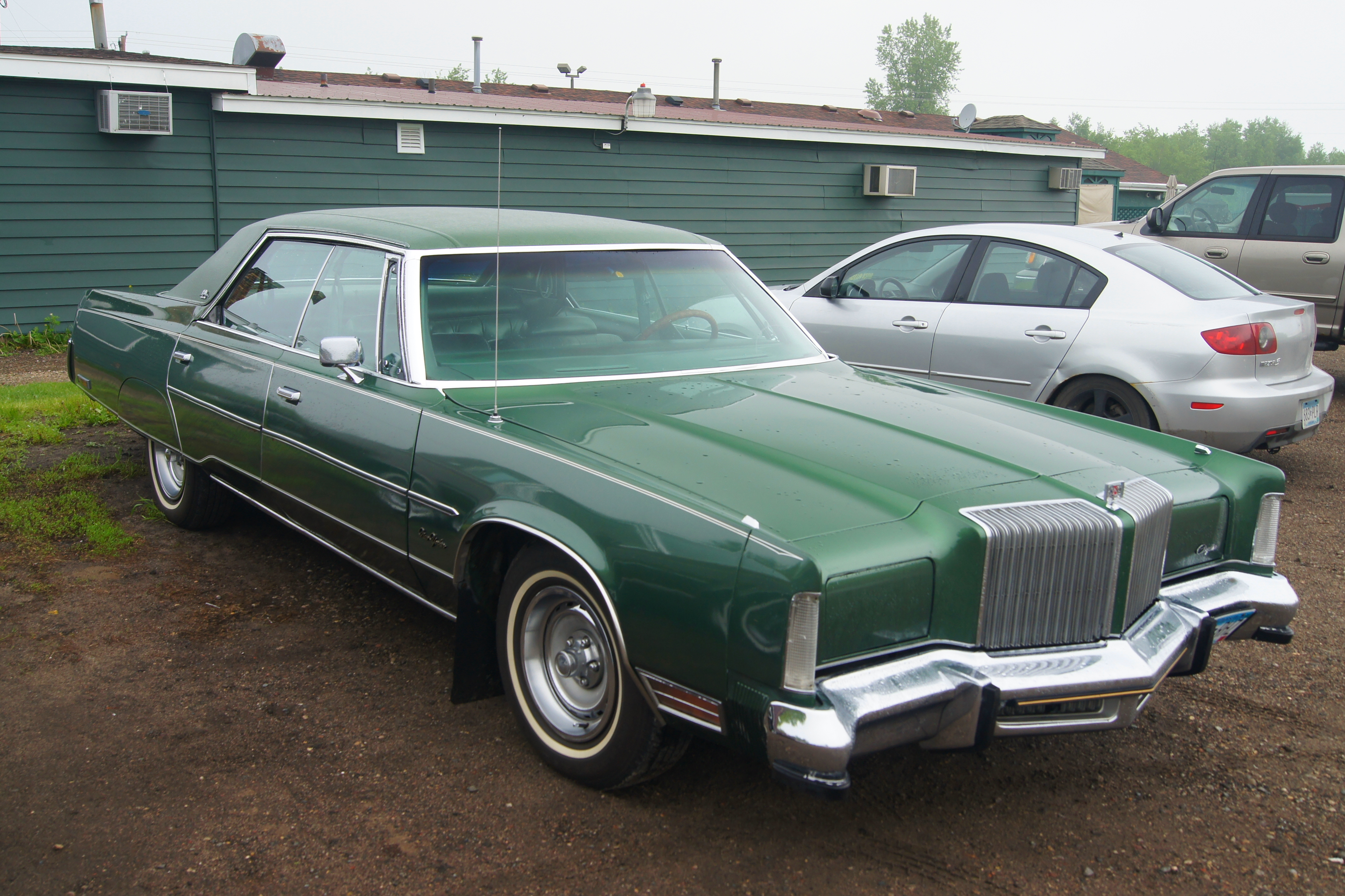
1977 New Yorker Brougham 4-door hardtop

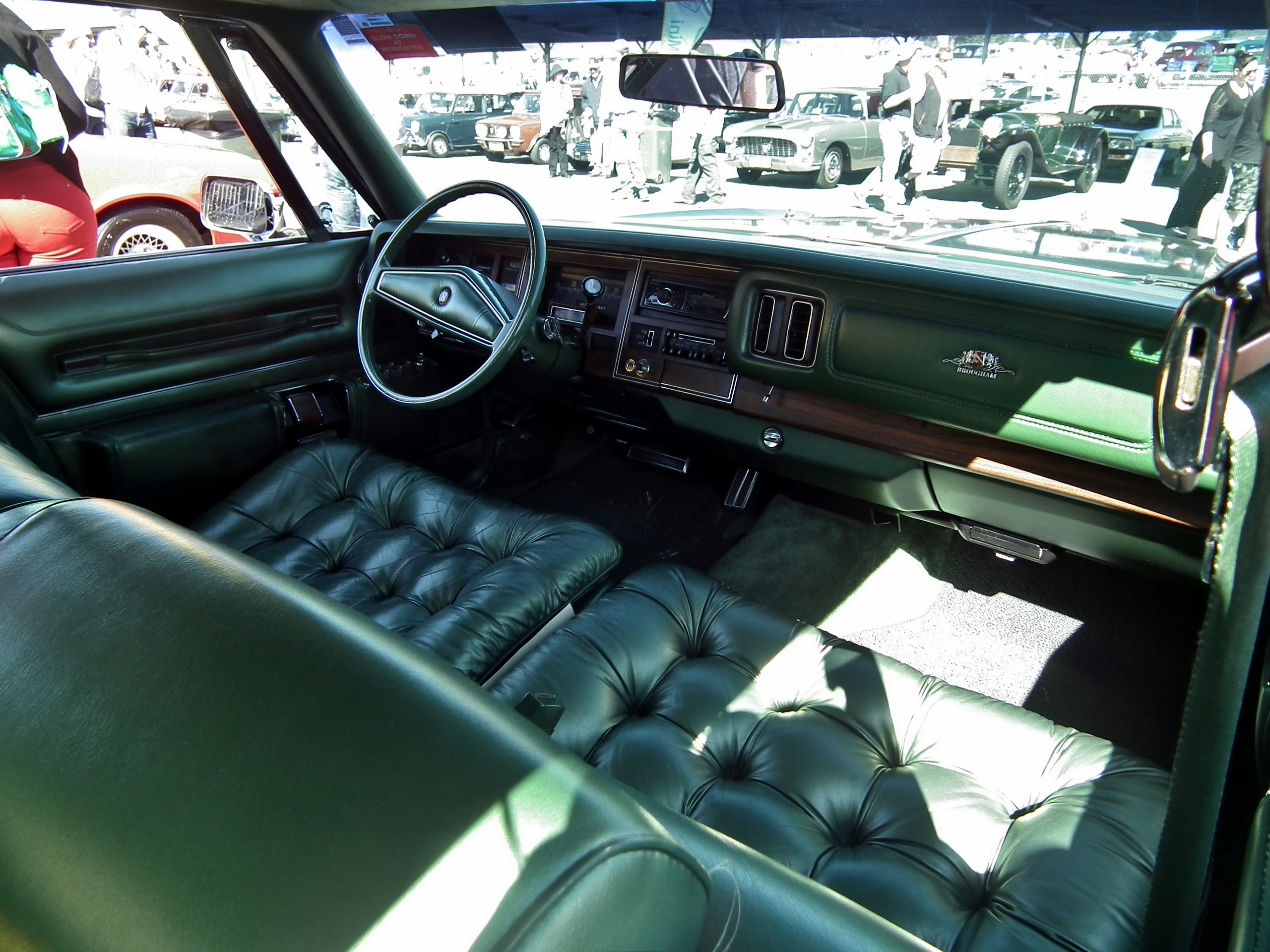
1977 New Yorker Brougham 4-door hardtop interior

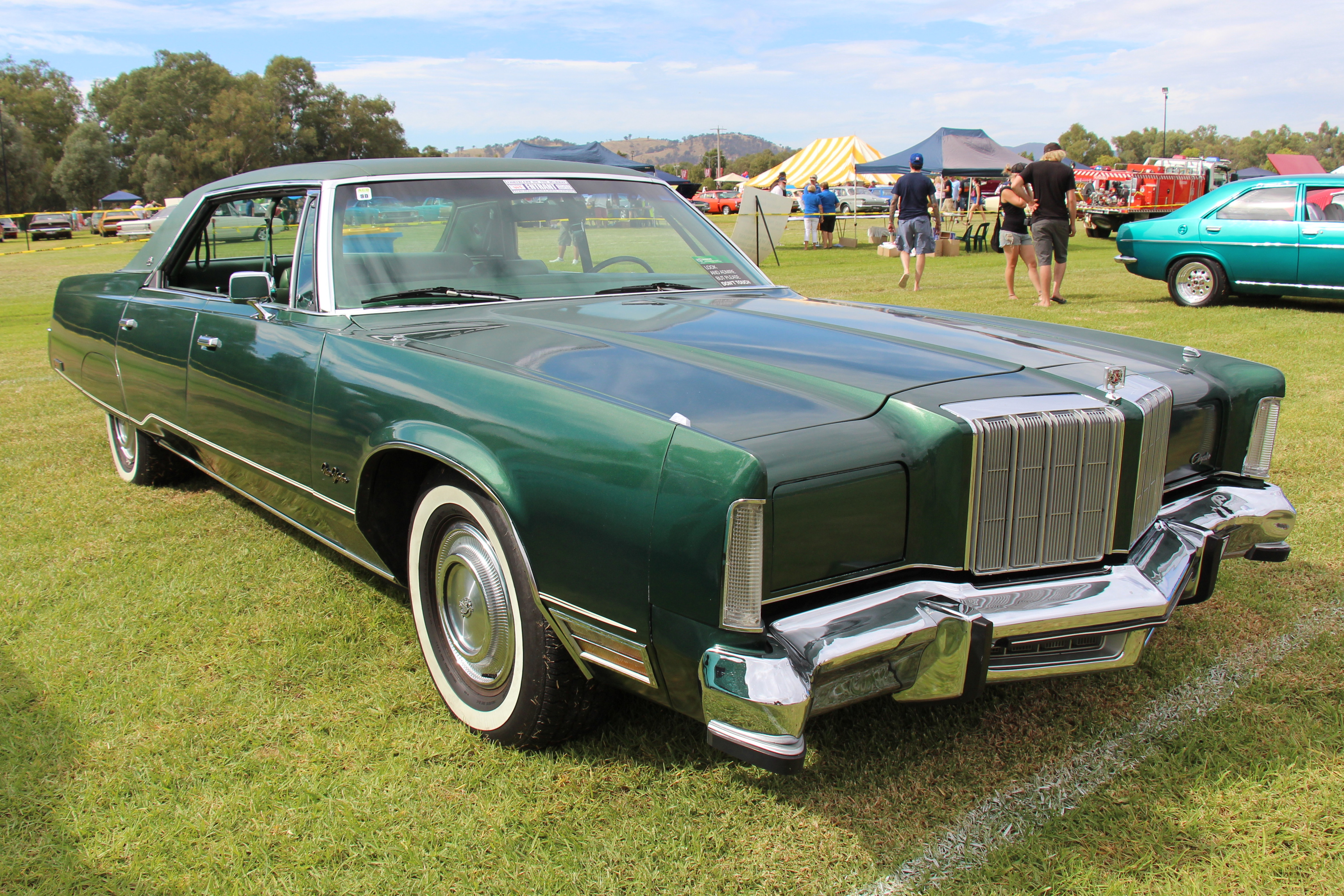
1978 New Yorker Brougham 4-door hardtop

== 1979–1981 ==
Series TP
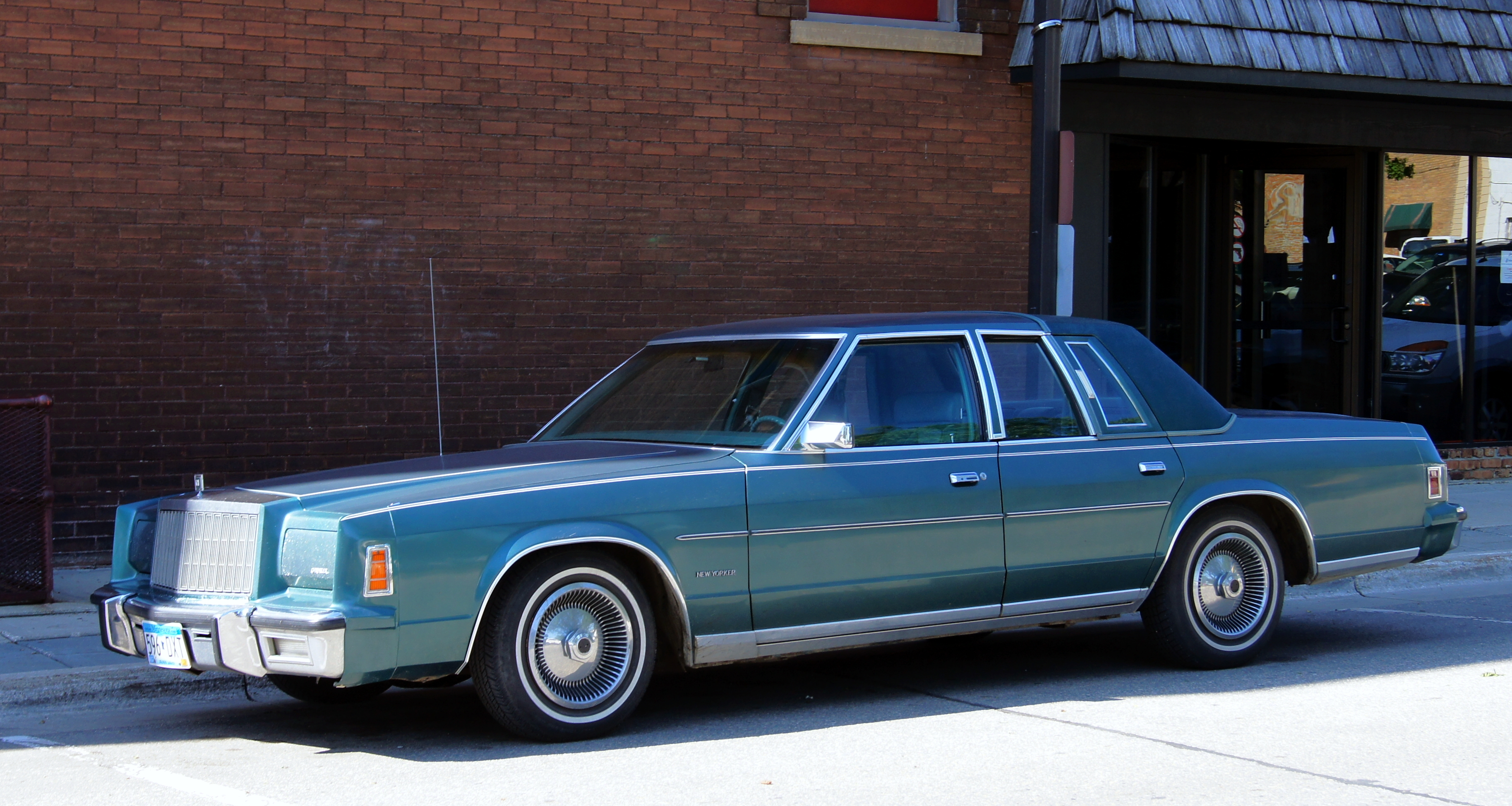
- 1979 New Yorker

Overview
- Model years: 1979–1981
- Assembly: United States: Detroit, Michigan (Lynch Road Assembly)

Body and chassis
- Body style: 4-door sedan
- Layout: FR layout
- Platform: R-body
- Chassis: body-on-frame
- Related: Chrysler Fifth Avenue; Chrysler Newport; Dodge St. Regis; Plymouth Gran Fury

Powertrain
- Engine: 318 cu in (5.2 L) Chrysler LA V8; 360 cu in (5.9 L) Chrysler LA V8

Dimensions
- Wheelbase: 118.5 in (3,010 mm)
- Length: 221.5 in (5,626 mm)
- Width: 77.1 in (1,958 mm)
- Height: 54.5 in (1,384 mm)
- Curb weight: 3,810 lb (1,730 kg)

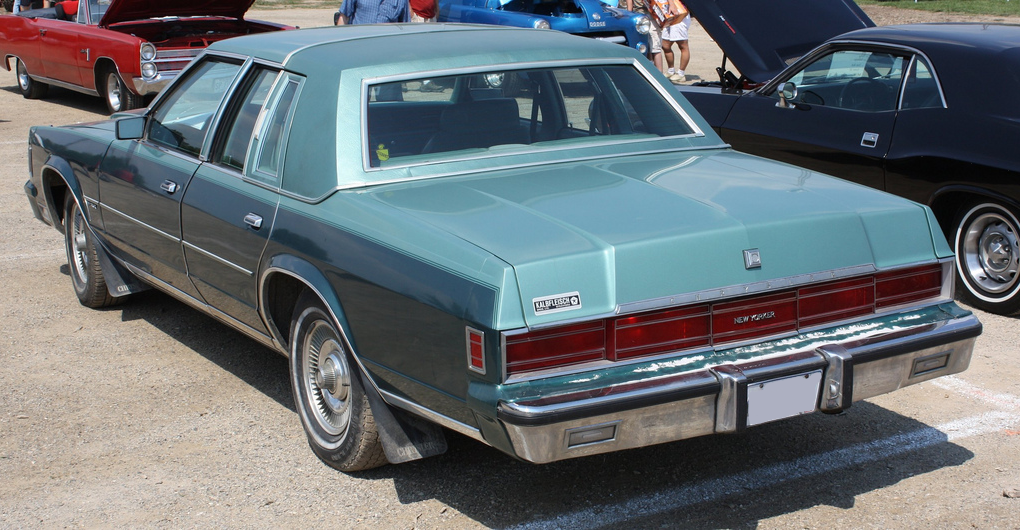
1979–1981 New Yorkers featured full-width tail lights

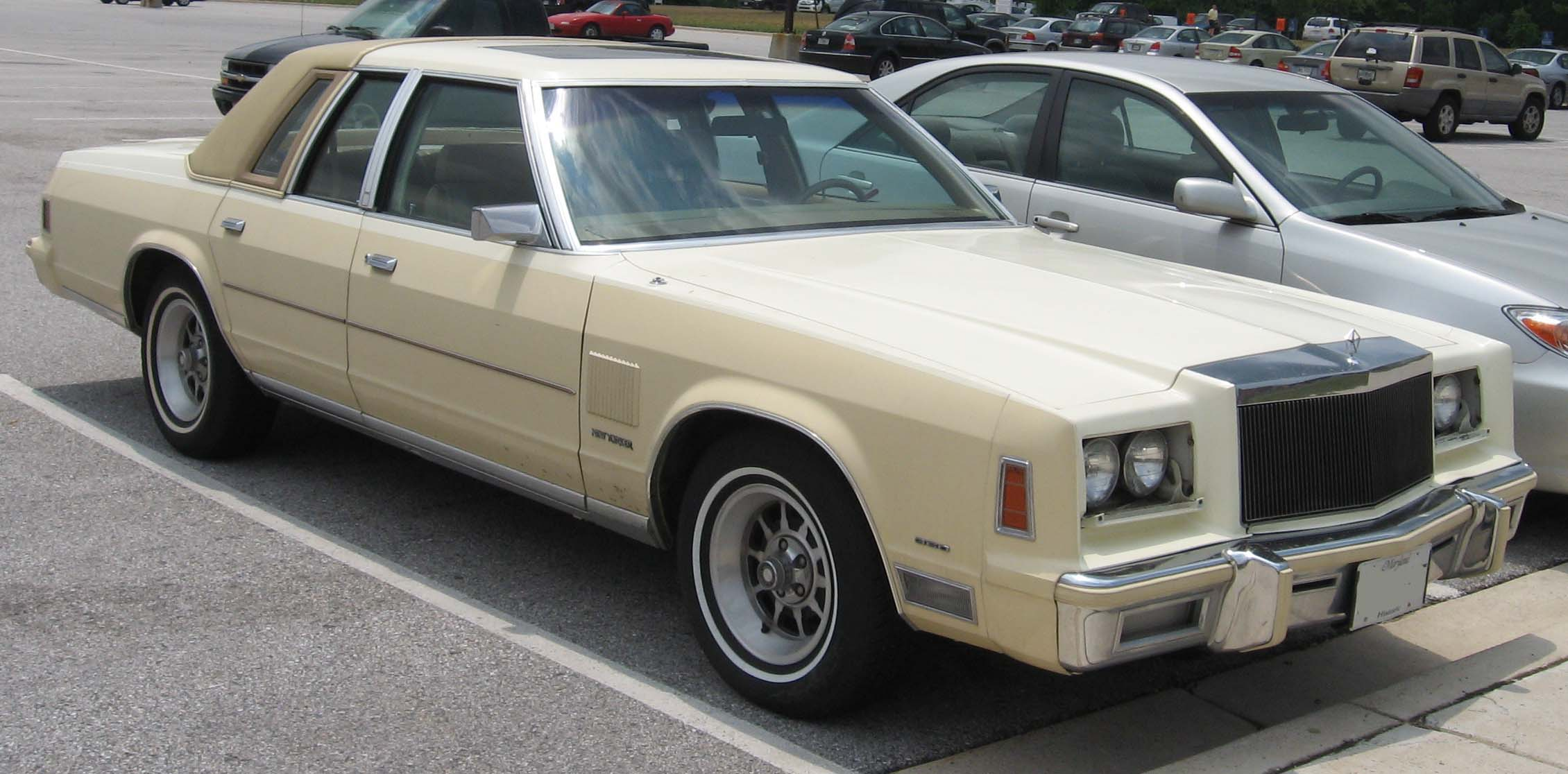
1981 New Yorker Fifth Avenue (shown with optional alloy road wheels, and concealed headlamp doors in open position)

The 1979 R-body series was a "pillared hardtop". The 318 cu in (5.2 L) V8 was standard, the 360 cu in (5.9 L) optional through 1980. While shorter and much lighter than the previous generation, these cars still had a big car look and ride. Hidden headlamps and full-width taillights distinguished it from its R-body siblings, the Chrysler Newport, Dodge St. Regis, and Plymouth Gran Fury. A new "Fifth Avenue" trim package was offered. Sales were robust, with almost 55,000 cars sold at a listed retail price of $8,631 ($38,287 in 2025 dollars).

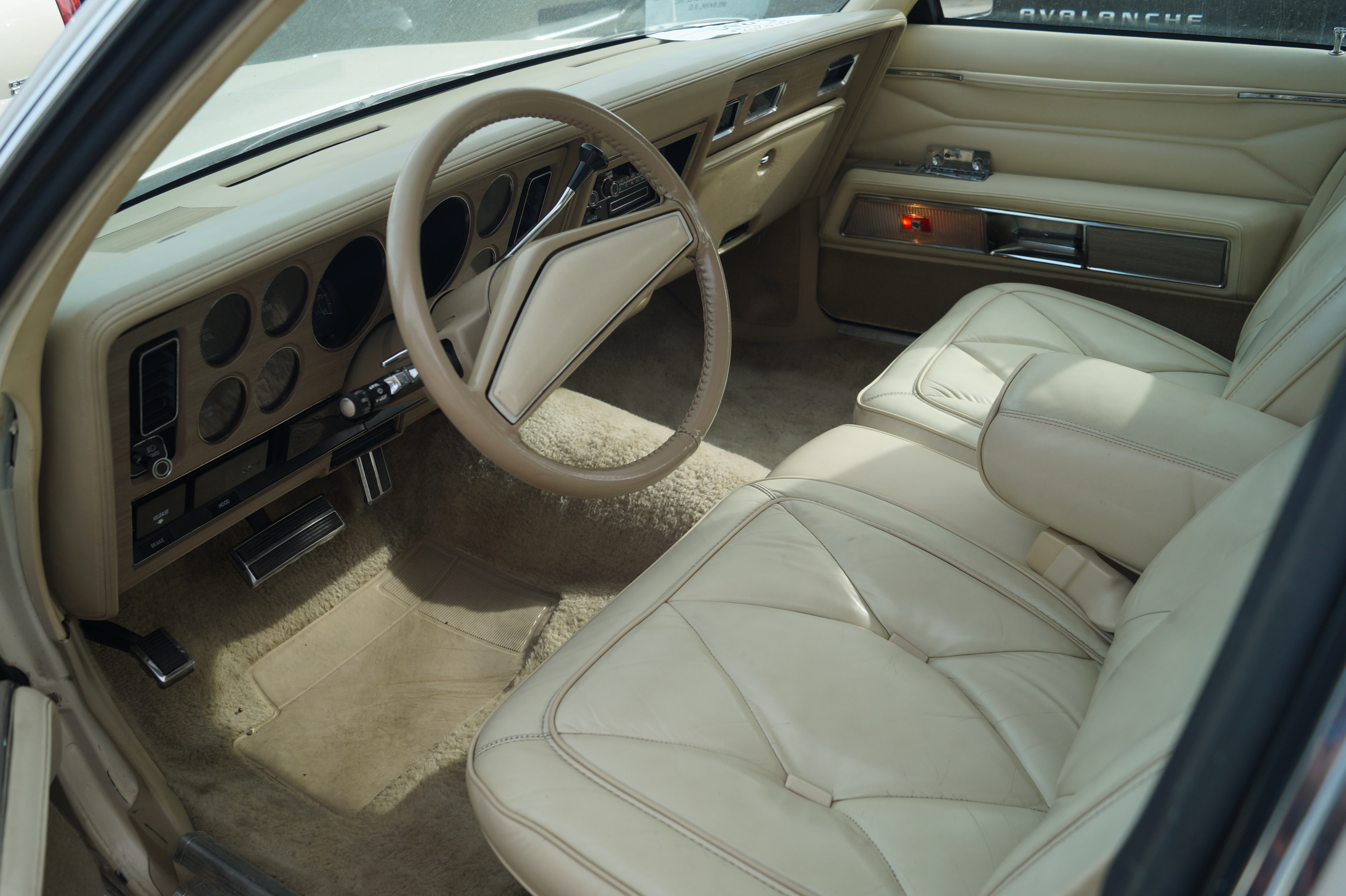
1979 New Yorker Fifth Avenue interior

The exterior colors offered were Dove Gray, Formal Black, Nightwatch Blue, Spinnaker White, metallic Teal Frost, Regent Red Sunfire, Sable Tan Sunfire, Medium Cashmere, Frost Blue and Teal Green Sunfire, all of which were shared with the Newport. The interior offered a front bench seat with a 60/40 split, upholstered in Richton cloth and vinyl with a folding center armrest. The front suspension continued to offer Chrysler's signature longitudinal front torsion bars, called Torsion-Aire, and anti-sway bar with a solid rear limited-slip differential connected to leaf springs.

To add to its exclusivity, Chrysler offered "Convenience and Appearance Options". The list offered Open Road Handling Package, Two-Tone Paint, interior lighting, air conditioning with an upgraded climate control feature, rear window defroster, cruise control, power adjustable front seat, power windows, power electric door locks, power trunk release, luxury appearance steering wheel with an extra cost leather wrapped feature, digital clock, locking gas cap, lighting and mirrors, halogen headlamps, cornering lamps, electric adjustable outside sideview mirrors, several AM/FM radio or separate stereo radio choices to include CB and 8-track cassette player, power electric extendable antenna, various vinyl side moldings and bumper guards, undercoating, color keyed seat belts, wheel covers, and aluminum wheels, all at extra cost.

In 1980, the New Yorker gained an upscale "Special Edition" trim package, featuring a brushed stainless steel roof treatment and exclusive mahogany metallic paint. It was more modest to the top level Fifth Avenue appearance and equipment option package, while six two-tone color combinations were also added to the options list. Sales were just over 13,500 cars as the price increased to $10,459 ($40,869 in 2025 dollars). The early 1980s recession had begun to take effect in the US, and sales of large and expensive cars were particularly impacted.

In 1981, a bold new grille with simple vertical ribs appeared. The "Fifth Avenue" option package remained, and a heavily optioned "Carriage Roof" package was added, available only in Nightwatch Blue or Mahogany Metallic, along with an extensive list of optional equipment. With a suggested retail price increased to US$10,459 ($37,039 in 2025 dollars) and an additional Fifth Avenue trim package price of US$1,300 ($4,604 in 2025 dollars), sales plummeted again to just over 6,500 cars.

Production Figures
Year	Units
1979	54,640
1980	13,513
1981	6,548
Total Production = 74,701

== 1982 ==
Series FS
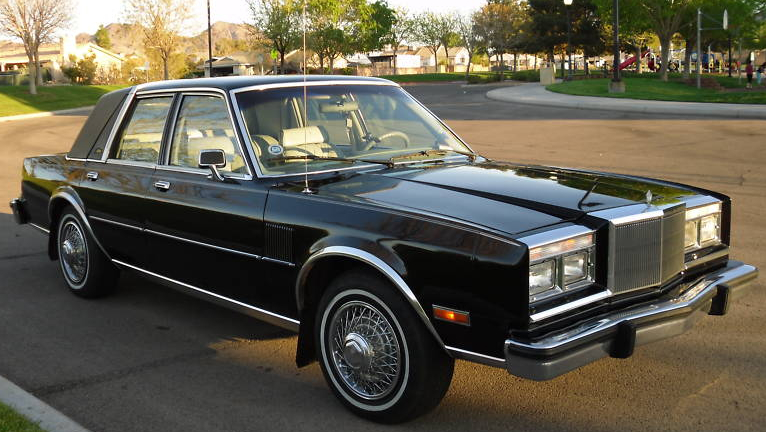

Overview
- Model years: 1982
- Assembly: Canada: Windsor, Ontario (Windsor Assembly)

Body and chassis
- Body style: 4-door sedan
- Layout: FR layout
- Platform: M-body
- Related: Chrysler Fifth Avenue; Chrysler LeBaron; Dodge Diplomat; Plymouth Gran Fury/Caravelle

Powertrain
- Engine: 225 cu in (3.7 L) RG I6; 318 cu in (5.2 L) LA V8

Dimensions
- Wheelbase: 112.7 in (2,863 mm)
- Length: 206.7 in (5,250 mm)
- Width: 74.2 in (1,885 mm)
- Height: 55.3 in (1,405 mm)

For 1982, Chrysler downsized both its New Yorker and LeBaron lines, with the New Yorker adopting the intermediate M-body chassis of the latter; the LeBaron became the flagship of the Chrysler K-car line (bridging the gap between compact and midsize cars). While retaining the use of rear-wheel drive, the New Yorker shed nearly 15 inches of length. In contrast to the preceding LeBaron, the New Yorker was offered solely as a four-door sedan, dropping the two-door coupe and five-door station wagon. While the front fascia was largely carryover (with a minor revision to the grille), the New Yorker adopted the formal 4-window roofline of the limited-edition Fifth Avenue, which returned as a flagship trim.

The M-body New Yorker became the first generation of the model line fitted with a six-cylinder engine, as the 3.7L Slant Six became standard fitment; the sole option was a 5.2L V8 (standard on Fifth Avenues); a three-speed automatic was paired with both engines.

=== Fifth Avenue (1982–1989) ===
After skipping the 1981 model year, the Fifth Avenue trim returned to the M platform, joining the New Yorker as its flagship trim line (rather than a limited edition). The formal "four-window" padded vinyl roof returned for 1981, and included nearly every available feature for the model line, including an illuminated entry system, power door locks, power driver's seat, power trunk release, AM/FM stereo, speed control, leather wrapped steering wheel, deluxe intermittent wipers, and wire wheel covers. Buyers chose between pillowed Corinthian leather or Kimberley velvet seats (standard New Yorkers had cloth or optional leather seats).

The 1982 model year would be the final model year that Chrysler offered the option of an 8-track cassette player and a CB radio.

As the renamed Chrysler Fifth Avenue, the model line continued production nearly unchanged through the 1989 model year.

Production figures
Year	Units
1982	50,509

== 1983–1988 ==
Series T / ET / E
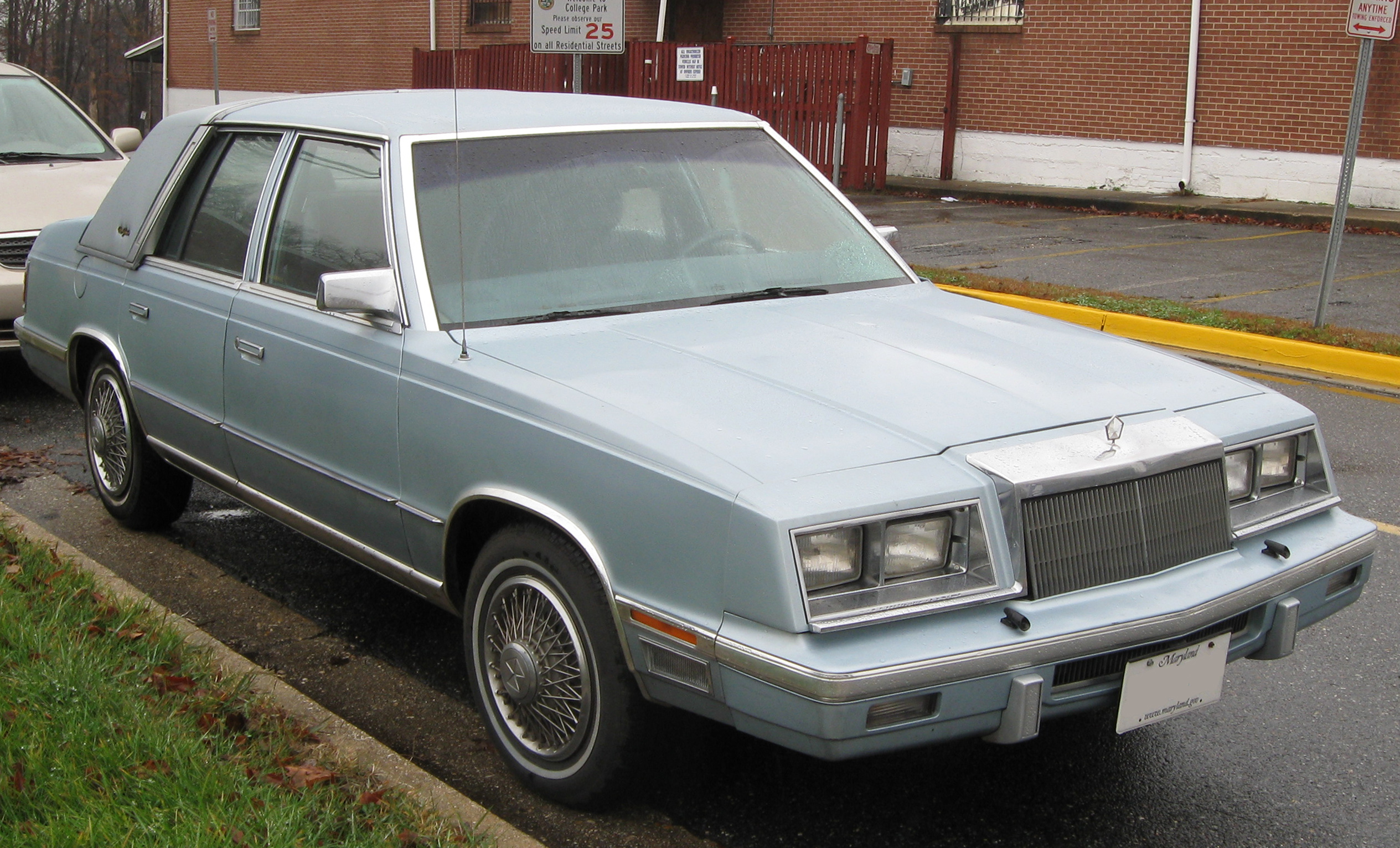
- 1987 New Yorker

Overview
- Also called: Chrysler New Yorker Turbo
- Model years: 1983–1988
- Assembly: United States: Detroit, Michigan (Jefferson Avenue Assembly); Mexico: Toluca (Toluca Car Assembly: 1986–1989)

Body and chassis
- Body style: 4-door sedan
- Layout: Transverse front-engine, front-wheel drive
- Platform: E-body
- Related: Chrysler Executive; Chrysler E-Class; Dodge 600; Plymouth Caravelle

Powertrain
- Engine: 2.2 L K I4; 2.2 L Turbo I I4; 2.5 L K I4; 2.6 L Mitsubishi G54B I4
- Transmission: 3-speed A413 automatic 3-speed A470 automatic

Dimensions
- Wheelbase: 103.3 in (2,624 mm)
- Length: 187.2 in (4,755 mm)
- Width: 68.0 in (1,727 mm)
- Height: 53.1 in (1,349 mm)

For 1983, Chrysler marketed two models of the New Yorker. The eleventh-generation (M-platform) New Yorker returned for 1983, exclusively with the flagship Fifth Avenue trim. In the spring of 1983, the twelfth-generation New Yorker was released. Sharing its body with the Dodge 600 and its companion Chrysler E-Class model line, the New Yorker shed nearly 9 inches of wheelbase, six inches of width, and approximately 20 inches of length.

The model line was based upon the front-wheel drive Chrysler E platform, extending the wheelbase of the LeBaron to 103.3 inches (three inches longer). Slotted between the E-Class and the New Yorker Fifth Avenue, the New Yorker was distinguished from its chassis counterpart by its standard padded "Landau" vinyl roof (which extended onto the rear fenders; in contrast to the LeBaron and Fifth Avenue, the New Yorker had exposed quarter glass on its rear doors). As with the E-Class, the New Yorker shared its front and rear fascias with the smaller LeBaron (along with its front doors). In contrast with the E Class/600, the New Yorker was a 5-passenger vehicle, equipped solely with a 50/50 split-bench seat (adding a center console between the front seats).

In contrast with its relatively classic appearance, the E platform New Yorker featured numerous technological advances over its predecessor. An electronic trip computer was an option, adding fuel economy, speed, and range information. The optional Electronic Voice Alert (EVA) system delivered a series of audio notifications related to the operational status of the vehicle; the EVA system also delivered several reminder notifications to the driver.

=== Model history ===
Along with serving as the first generation of the model line to adopt front-wheel drive, the E-platform is the smallest-ever version of the New Yorker.

1983: E platform New Yorker launched as a mid-year introduction. 2.2L I4 is standard, with 2.6L I4 optional; both engines paired with 3-speed automatic transmission. Two trim levels available: velour-upholstery standard New Yorker and leather-upholstery New Yorker Mark Cross. Only year for combination of analog gauges, trip computer and optional Electronic Voice Alert.

1984: M platform Fifth Avenue drops New Yorker prefix; Chrysler subsequently sells only the E platform model line. Minor exterior styling update, adopting wraparound taillamps and chrome-set headlamps (along with revised exterior trim). The 2.6L engine becomes standard, with a turbocharged version of the 2.2L I4 (140 hp) becoming optional. The seats are restyled with a "pillowed" design (similar to the Fifth Avenue); the Mark Cross package is dropped with a leather option trim (closer in style with the velour upholstery). Along with adoption of a redesigned Chrysler steering wheel, the dashboard undergoes several updates, with digital instruments becoming standard, adding a message center allowing the car to further display notifications of its status; the EVA and trip computer were options. As Chrysler integrated double-DIN radios into its vehicles, electronically-tuned radios became standard.

1985: Exterior largely carryover from 1984, with fixed head restraints added to the rear seats; overhead console becomes interior option. In a functional change, the design of the decklid and fuel-filler releases were revised to allow their opening without the vehicle running (or to set the decklid to be opened only with a key)

1986: The exterior underwent a minor styling update; distinguished by the integration of the opera lamp in the chrome trim, the rear taillamps are redesigned (relocating the license plate to the rear bumper). The chassis saw the introduction of load-leveling rear suspension (as an option). A 100hp Chrysler-built 2.5L I4 replaces the Mitsubishi 2.6L engine; the 146hp 2.2L turbocharged I4 remains an option. The 50/50 front seats are redesigned to accommodate a center passenger (making the New Yorker a 6-passenger vehicle). The dashboard underwent a facelift, adopting larger displays for the digital instrument panel (which also better integrated the message center, trip computer, and EVA). Electronically-controlled air conditioning became a new option.

1987: Minor exterior revision from 1986, as New Yorker Turbo saw its hood vents removed; fender louvers (seen since 1983) were removed from all New Yorkers. While most of the dashboard was largely carried over from 1986, the steering wheel was redesigned for a second time. A power antenna became a new option.

1988: Abbreviated model year, largely intended to use up leftover body production from 1987. In response to the introduction of its successor for 1988, Chrysler renamed this vehicle as the "New Yorker Turbo", with the 2.2L turbocharged I4 becoming the only available engine. In addition to the turbo engine becoming standard, many previously optional features became standard, including tilt steering, cruise control, power equipment, rear window defroster, and Infinity sound system; buyers typically had to choose between velour and leather upholstery and wheel design (load-leveling suspension was among the few extra-cost options).

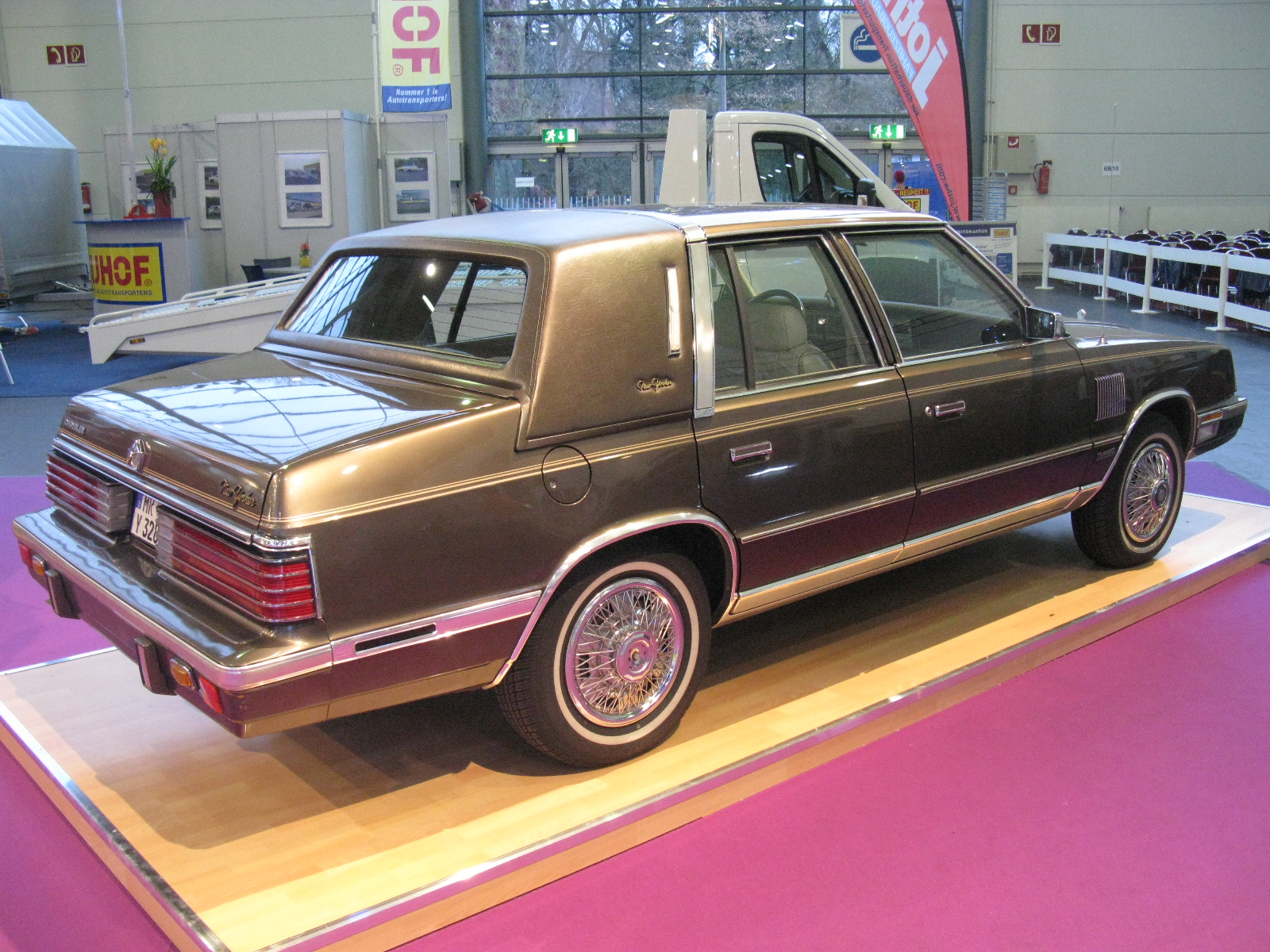
1984 New Yorker

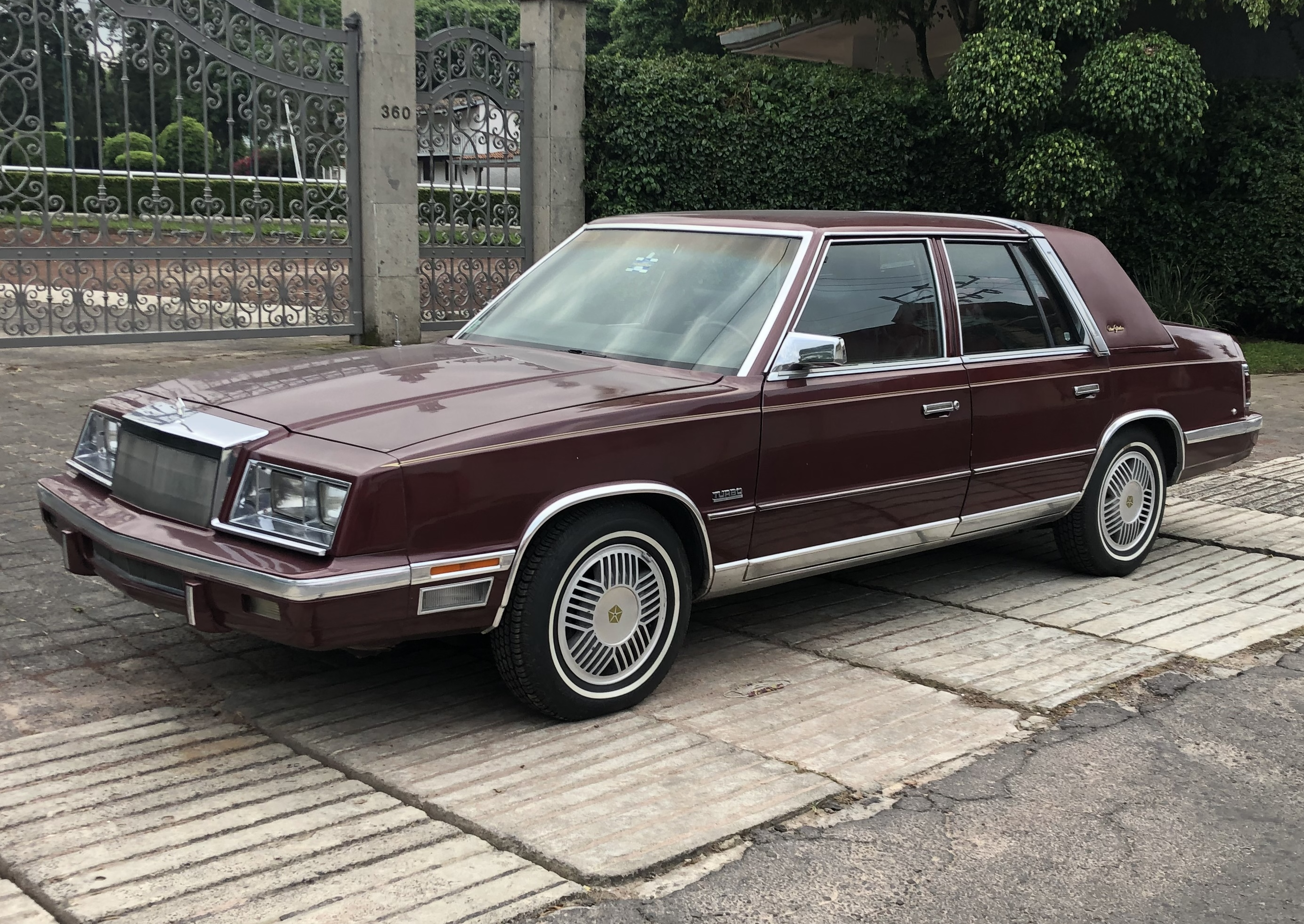
1988 New Yorker Turbo (Mexico)

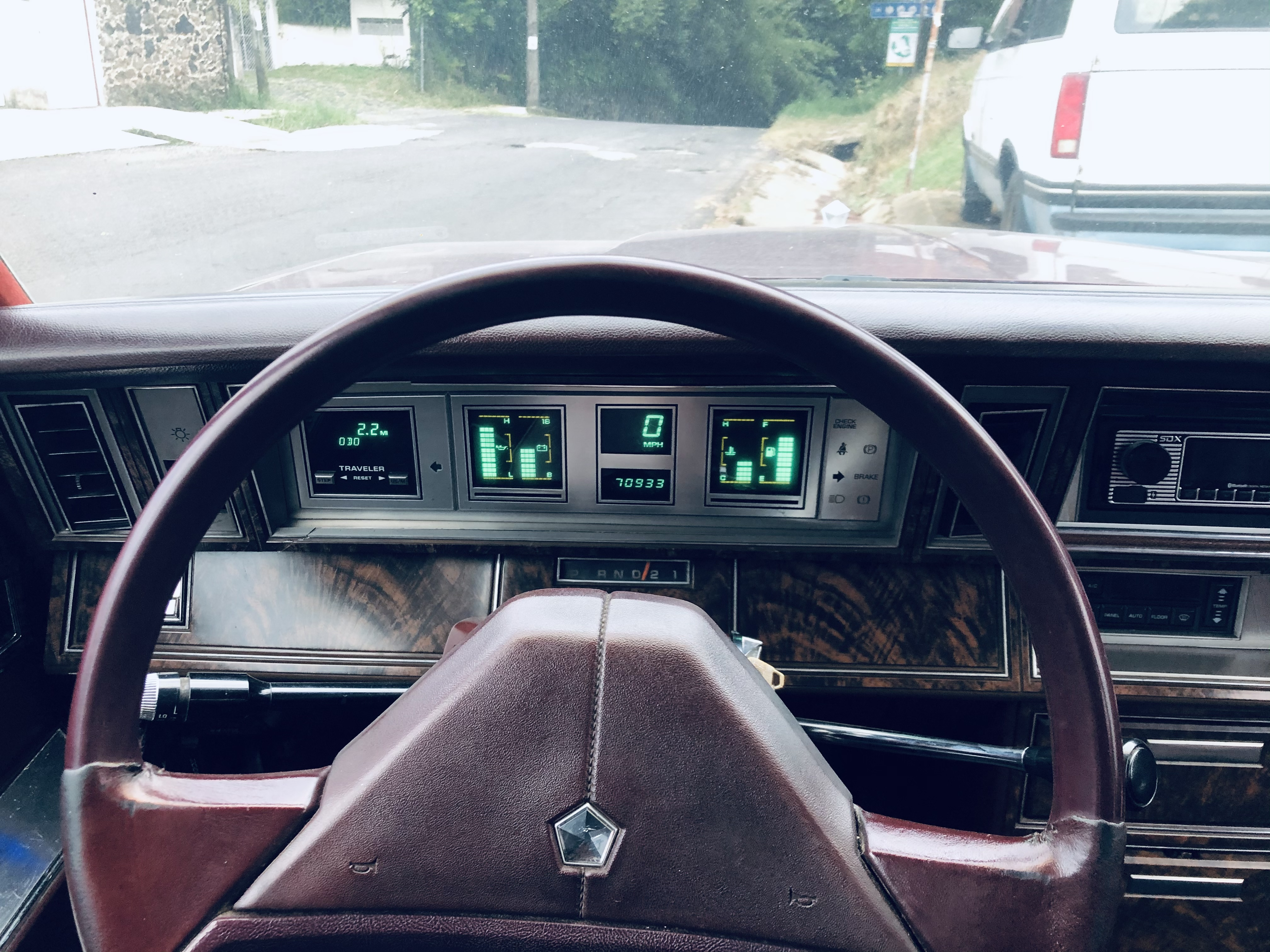
The New Yorker Turbo's digital instrument panel

Production figures
Year	Units
1983	33,832
1984	60,501
1985	60,700
1986	51,099
1987	68,279
1988 (Turbo)	8,805
Total Production = 283,216

== 1988–1993 ==
Series C
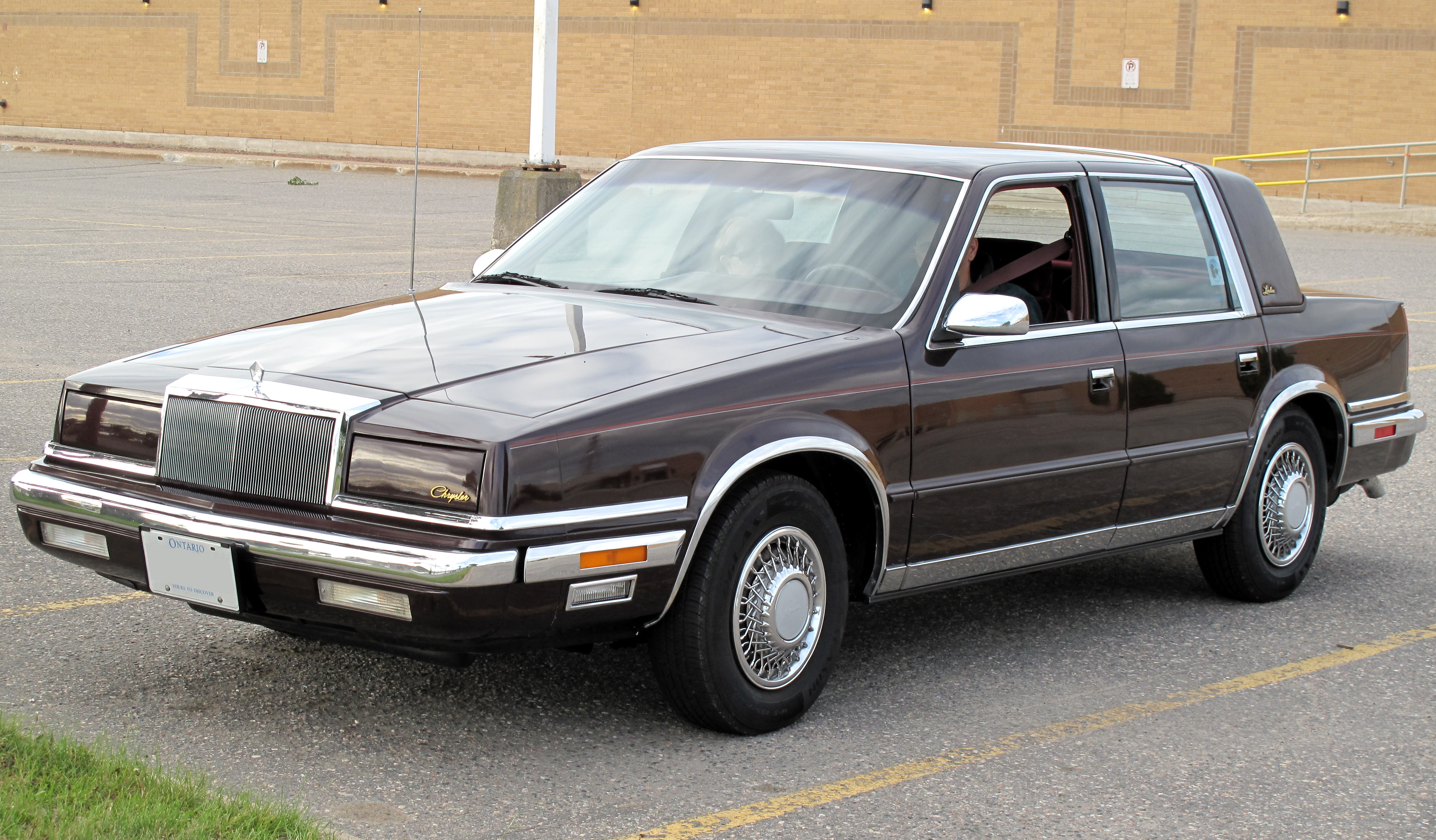
- 1990 New Yorker Landau

Overview
- Model years: 1988–1993
- Assembly: United States: Belvidere, Illinois (Belvidere Assembly Plant)

Body and chassis
- Body style: 4-door sedan
- Layout: Transverse front-engine, front-wheel drive
- Platform: C-body
- Related: Chrysler New Yorker Fifth Avenue; Chrysler Imperial; Dodge Dynasty

Powertrain
- Engine: 3.0 L (183.1 cu in) Mitsubishi 6G72 V6; 3.3 L (201.4 cu in) EGA V6
- Transmission: 3-speed A670 automatic 4-speed A604 automatic

Dimensions
- Wheelbase: 1988–1990: 104.3 in (2,649 mm); 1991–93: 104.5 in (2,654 mm)
- Length: 193.6 in (4,917 mm)
- Width: 1988–1990: 68.5 in (1,740 mm); 1991–93: 68.9 in (1,750 mm)
- Height: 1988–1990: 53.5 in (1,359 mm); 1991–93: 53.6 in (1,361 mm)

The redesigned 1988 New Yorker was larger (see Chrysler C platform), with many underbody and suspension components carried over and sharing much of its design with the rebadged variant, the Dodge Dynasty. The new version had a V6 engine, a Mitsubishi-sourced 3.0-liter unit, and optional anti-lock brakes. Maximum power was 136 hp (101 kW) at 4,800 rpm; for the first model year only, the New Yorker received a three-speed automatic transmission. Base and Landau trim choices were offered, the latter of which carried a rear-quarter vinyl top. Hidden headlamps, a feature lost when the R-body cars were discontinued in 1981, returned. All thirteenth-generation New Yorkers, as well as the reintroduced flagship 1990-1993 Imperial, were covered by Chrysler's market-leading "Crystal Key Owner Care Program", which included a 5-year/50,000-mile limited warranty and 7-year/70,000-mile powertrain warranty. A 24-hour toll-free customer service hotline was also provided.

For 1989, the 3.0 L V6 engine received a slight horsepower increase to 141 hp (105 kW) at 5,000 rpm, and was now mated to a new 4-speed Ultradrive automatic transmission. This year also marked the 50th anniversary of the "New Yorker" name. Although no special anniversary edition or recognition was offered at the time, it turned out to be the most popular New Yorker of the model run, with over 100,000 units produced that year.

In 1990, the base model New Yorker was replaced by the "New Yorker Salon". Unlike the previous base model, the Salon was essentially a rebadged Dodge Dynasty, using near-identical versions of that model's exposed headlamps, horizontal taillights, and grille. The only significant exterior difference other than the nameplates was the "waterfall" grille insert, with fine vertical bars, rather than the Dynasty's "crosshair" pattern. The New Yorker Salon was marketed as the Chrysler Dynasty in Canada. All models carried a new Chrysler-built 3.3 L V6 engine from this year on. Maximum power increased to 147 hp (110 kW) at 4,800 rpm, while torque also received a boost, from 171 to 183 lb⋅ft (232 to 248 N⋅m) at 3,600 rpm. Minor changes to the interior included a revised, contoured dash, while a driver's side airbag was made standard.

The Landau model, which overlapped with the New Yorker Fifth Avenue, was dropped for 1991 but the Salon was upgraded and included more standard equipment, hidden headlights, vertical taillights, and a traditional Chrysler grille.

A styling update for 1992 produced a more rounded appearance front and rear. A padded landau roof, similar to one previously featured on the "Landau" model, was now an option on the Salon.

The previous year's restyle carried into 1993. The last thirteenth-generation New Yorker was manufactured on May 28, 1993.

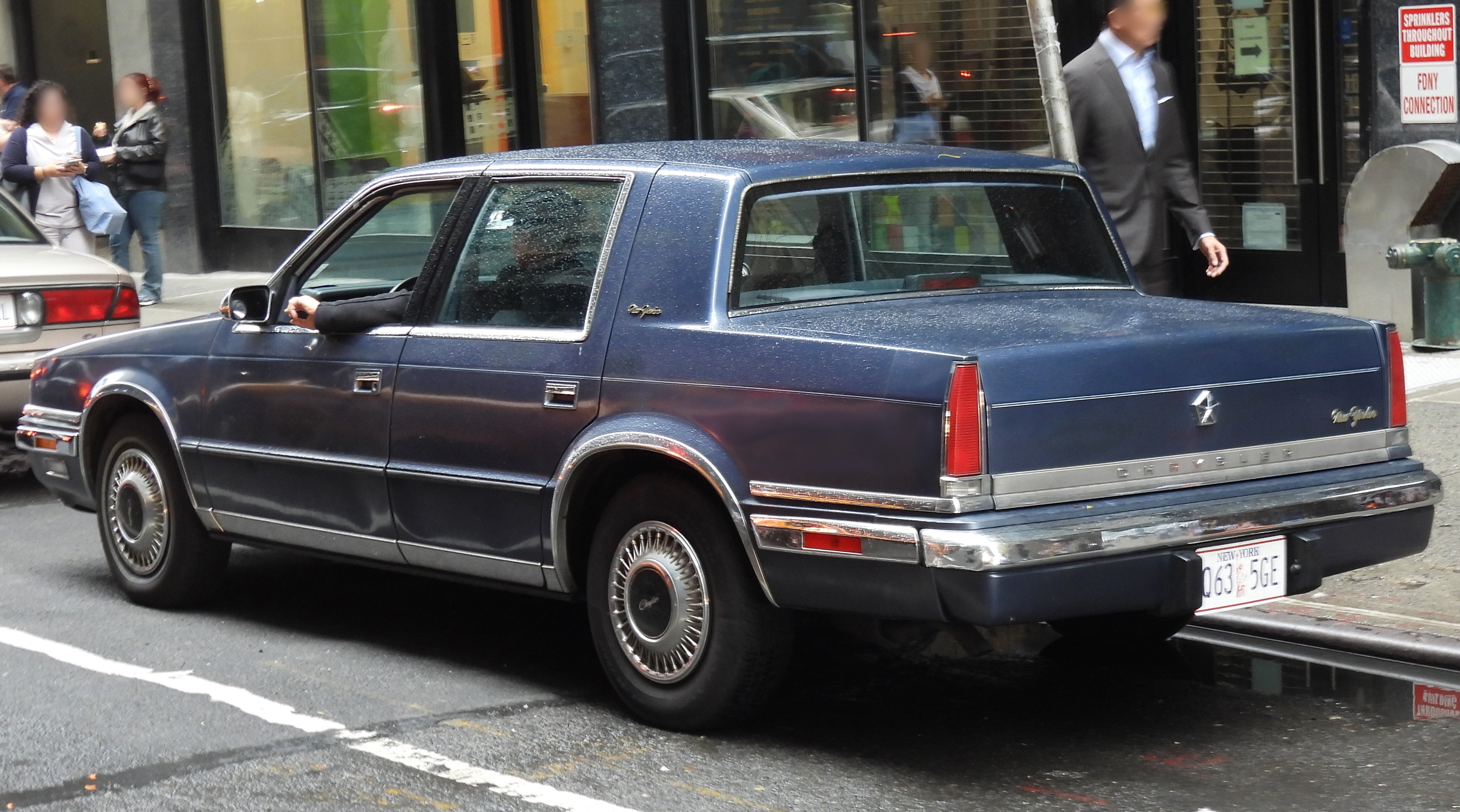
1989 New Yorker (base); this version received hidden headlamps but no vinyl roof

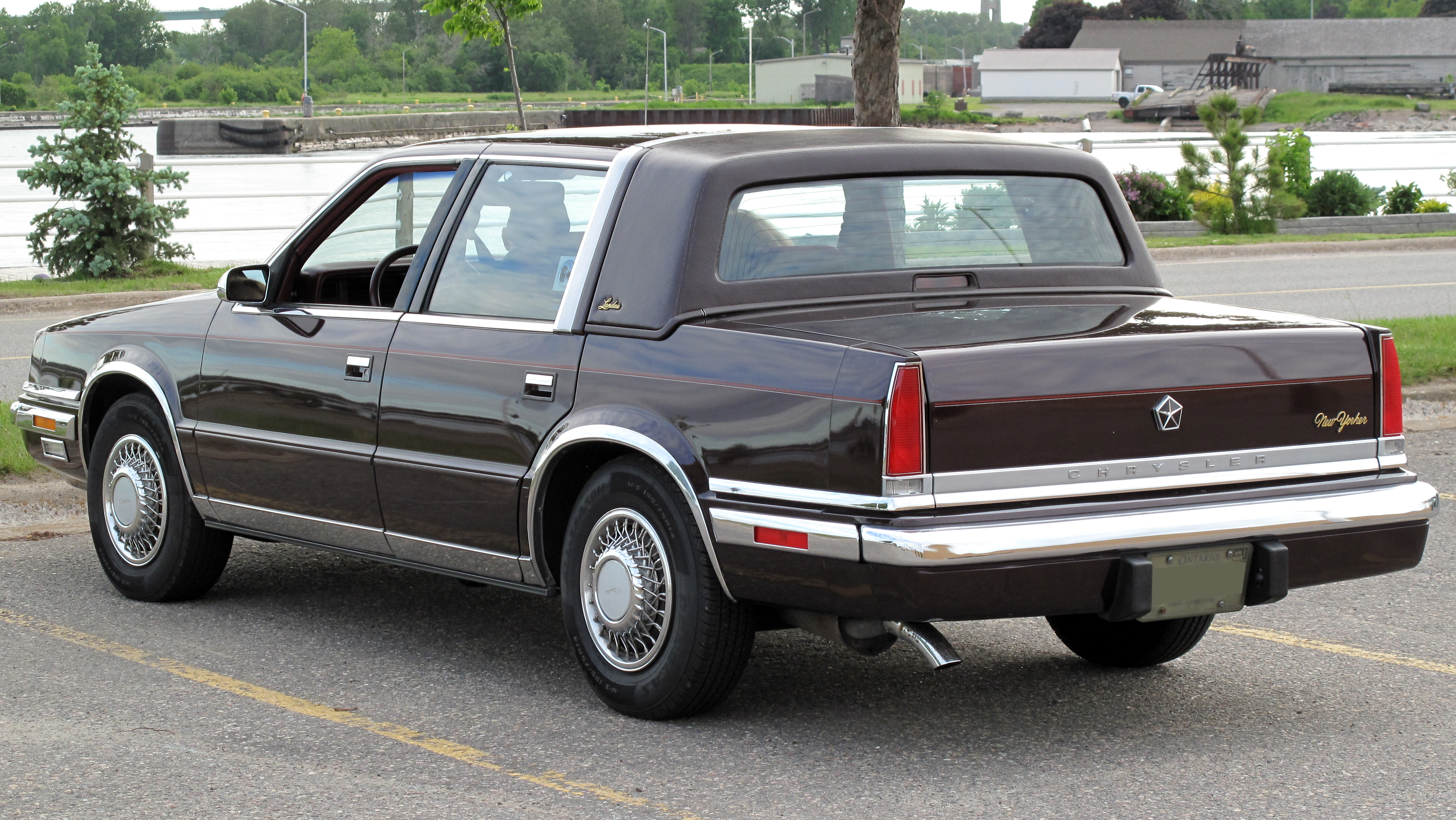
1990 New Yorker Landau; rear view

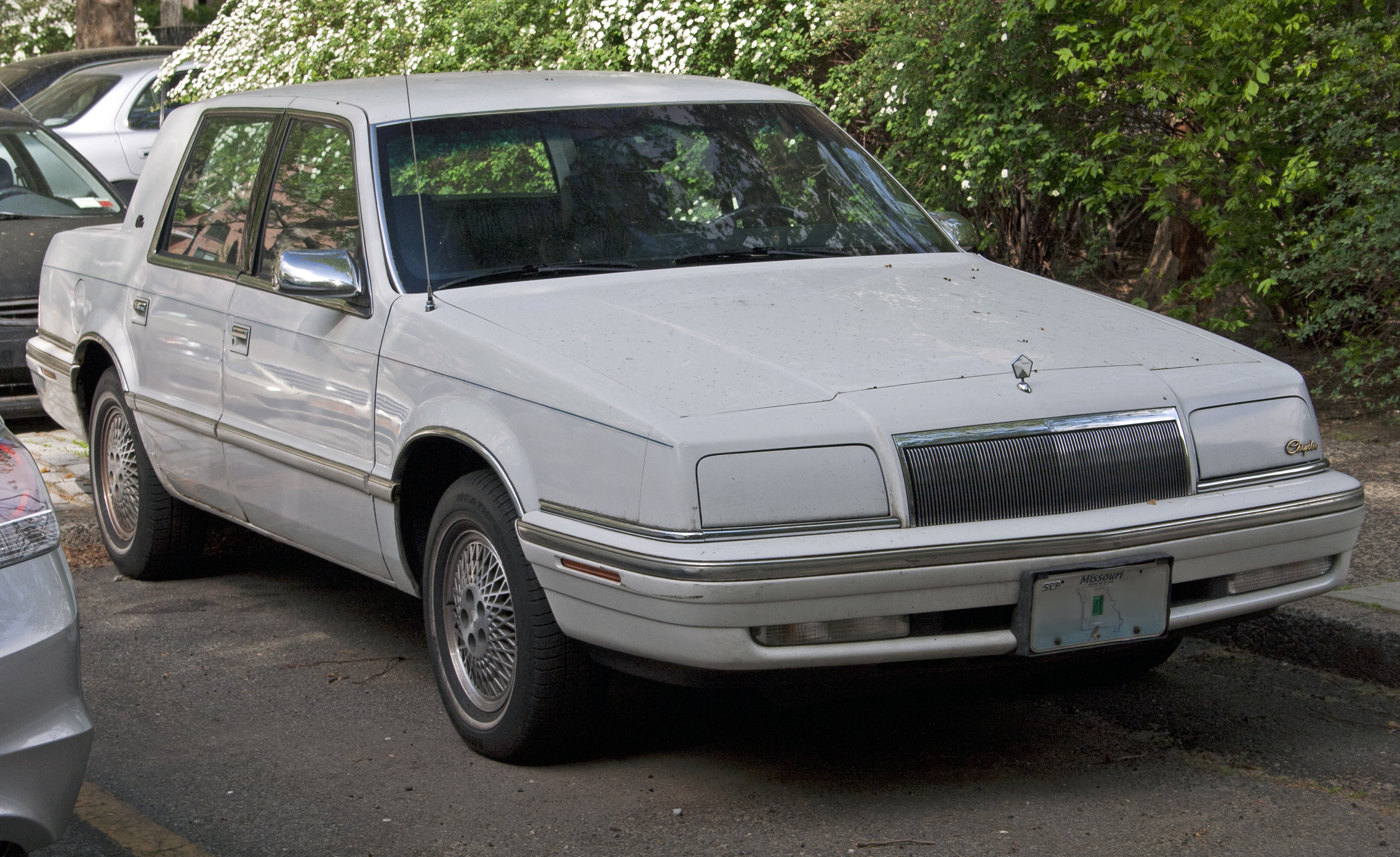
The more rounded front of the facelifted New Yorker Salon (1992-1993)

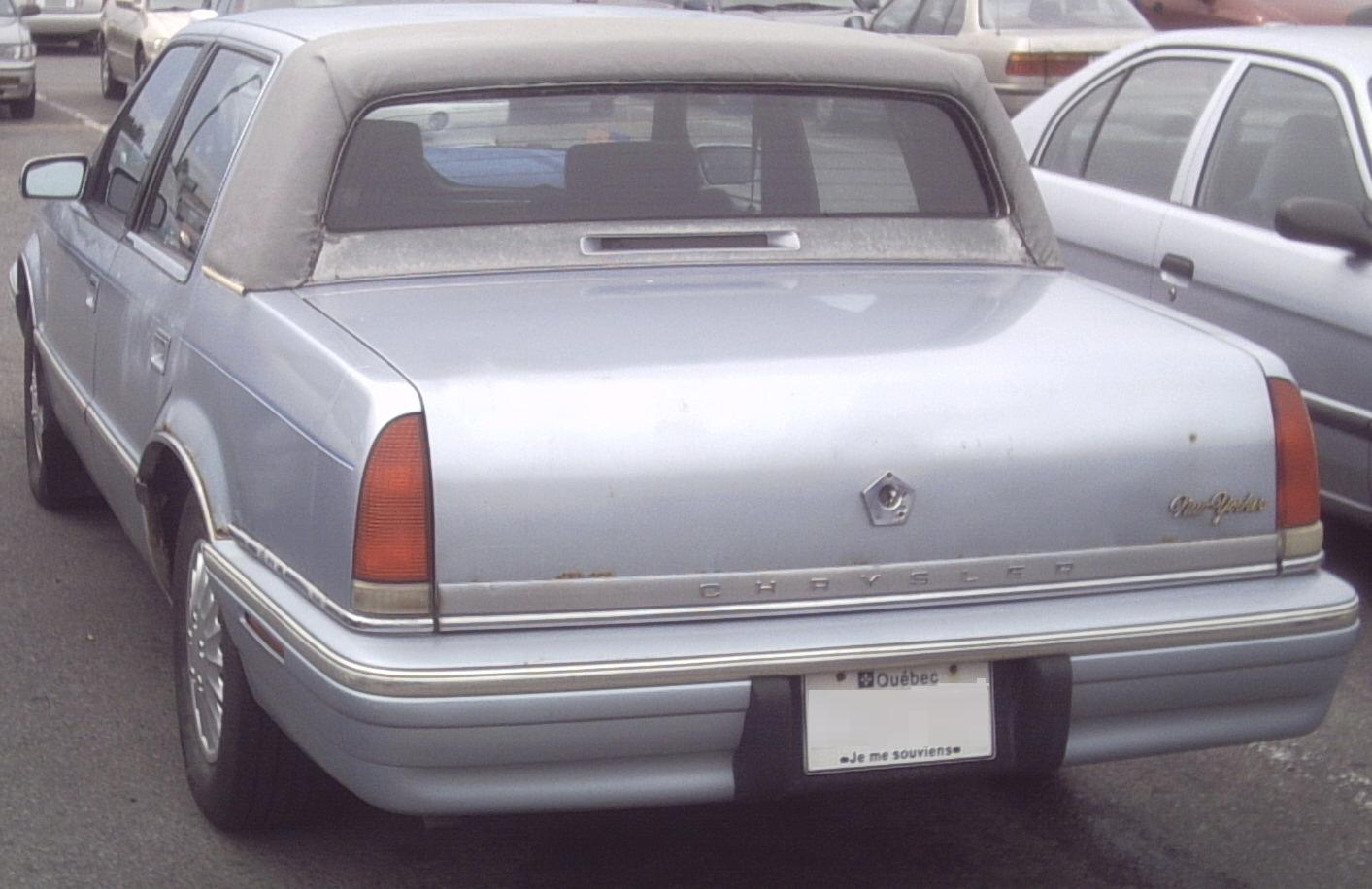
Facelift New Yorker Salon with a more rounded design; rear view

=== Mexico ===
In Mexico, the contemporary Chrysler LeBaron (AA) was sold as a New Yorker as the Series C was not available there.

=== New Yorker Fifth Avenue ===
Beginning with the 1990 model year, a stretched-wheelbase variant of the New Yorker was offered under the New Yorker Fifth Avenue name. This model was intended to replace the recently departed M-body platform. The New Yorker Fifth Avenue was discontinued in 1993.

Production Figures (New Yorker)
Year	Units
1988	70,968
1989	100,461
1990	86,004
1991	55,229
1992	51,650
1993	52,128
Total Production = 416,440

== 1994–1996 ==
Series H
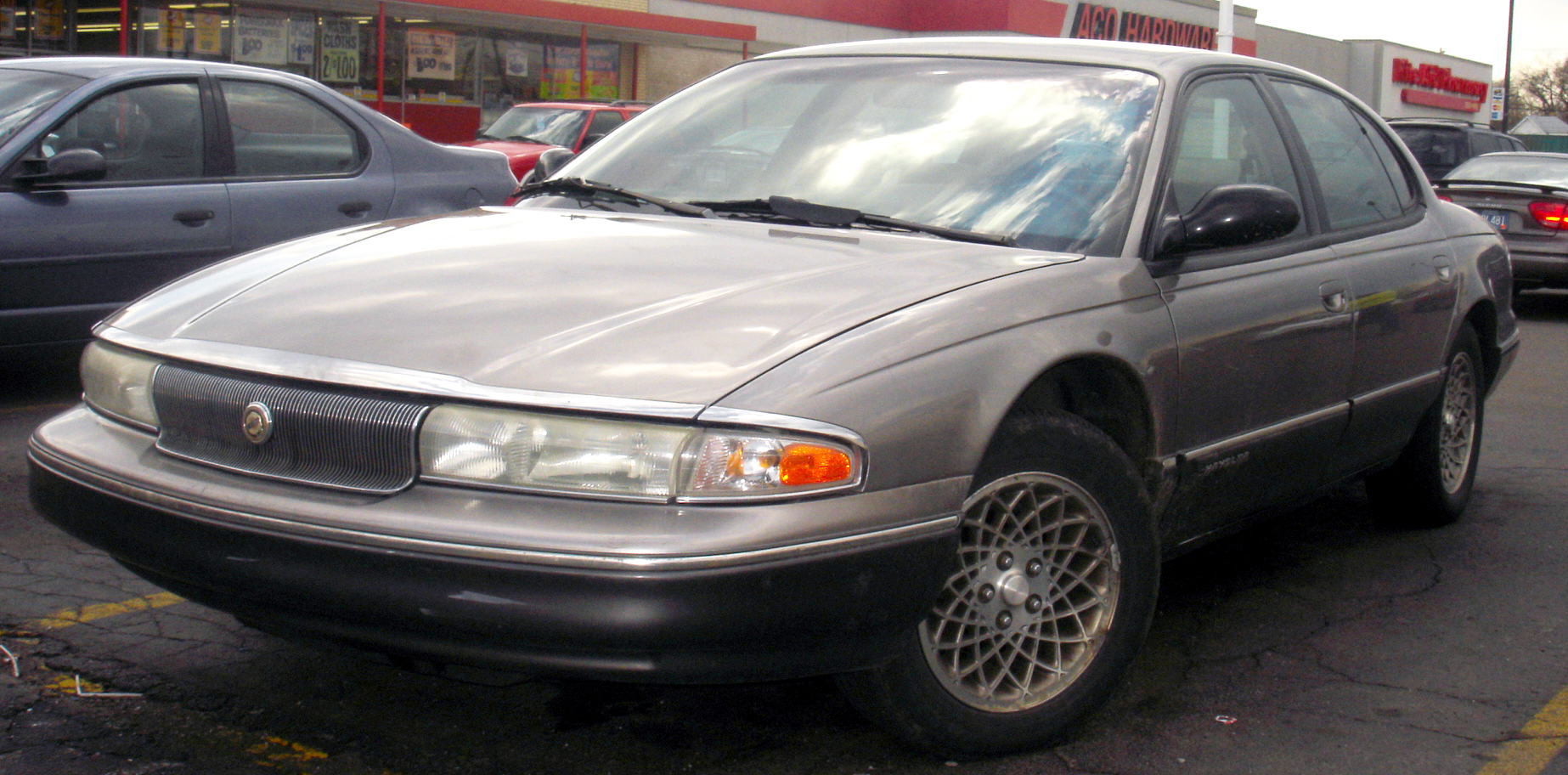
- 1995 New Yorker

Overview
- Also called: Chrysler LHS
- Model years: 1994–1996 (New Yorker); 1994–1997 (LHS)
- Assembly: Canada: Brampton, Ontario (Brampton Assembly)

Body and chassis
- Body style: 4-door sedan
- Layout: Longitudinal front-engine, front-wheel drive
- Platform: Chrysler LH platform
- Related: Chrysler Concorde; Chrysler LHS; Dodge Intrepid; Eagle Vision

Powertrain
- Engine: 3.5 L EGE V6
- Transmission: 4-speed 42LE automatic

Dimensions
- Wheelbase: 113.0 in (2,870 mm)
- Length: 207.4 in (5,268 mm)
- Width: 74.4 in (1,890 mm)
- Height: 1994: 55.7 in (1,415 mm); 1995–96: 55.9 in (1,420 mm)
- Curb weight: 3,483–3,587 lb (1,580–1,627 kg)

The final generation of the New Yorker continued with front-wheel drive on an elongated version of the new Chrysler LH platform, and was shown at the 1992 North American International Auto Show in Detroit. It was released in May 1993 along with the nearly identical Chrysler LHS as an early 1994 model, six months after the original LH cars: the Chrysler Concorde, Dodge Intrepid, and Eagle Vision, were introduced. The New Yorker came standard with the 3.5 L EGE, which produced 214 hp (160 kW). Chrysler gave the New Yorker a more "traditional American" luxury image and the LHS a more European performance image (as was done with the Eagle Vision). Little separated New Yorker from LHS in appearance, with New Yorker's chrome hood trim, body-color cladding, standard chrome wheel covers, and 15-inch wheels, column shifter and front bench seat, being the only noticeable differences. An option provided for 16-inch wheels and a firmer suspension type ("touring suspension"). This option eliminated the technical differences between the New Yorker and LHS. LHS came with almost all of New Yorker's optional features as standard equipment and featured the firmer tuned suspension, to go with its more European image. This model was also officially sold by Chrysler in Europe.

During the 1994 model run, various changes were made to the New Yorker. On the outside, New Yorker was switched to new accent-color body cladding, whereas LHS received body-color cladding. This change aligned New Yorker with the Chrysler Concorde, which also had accent-color cladding. The 16-inch wheels became standard. Likewise, the touring suspension option available on early 1994 New Yorker models was discontinued, leaving only "ride-tuned" suspension. This resulted in a permanent technical difference with LHS.

For 1995, the New Yorker received Chrysler's revived blue ribbon logo (last used in the 1950s) on its grille, which replaced the Pentastar that had been used on models beginning in 1980.

The 1996 model featured additional sound insulation and revised structural engineering to give it a quieter ride. A new built-in transmitter replaced the remote garage door opener. The antenna was now integrated into the rear window. Due to similarities between the New Yorker and LHS, and the LHS's strong sales, the New Yorker name was dropped after a short 1996 production run. Despite being far more contemporary and monochromatic in design compared to previous models, the traditional New Yorker with its two-tone cladding and chrome trim still did not follow the modern, monochromatic styling trend of the division's other vehicles in 1996.

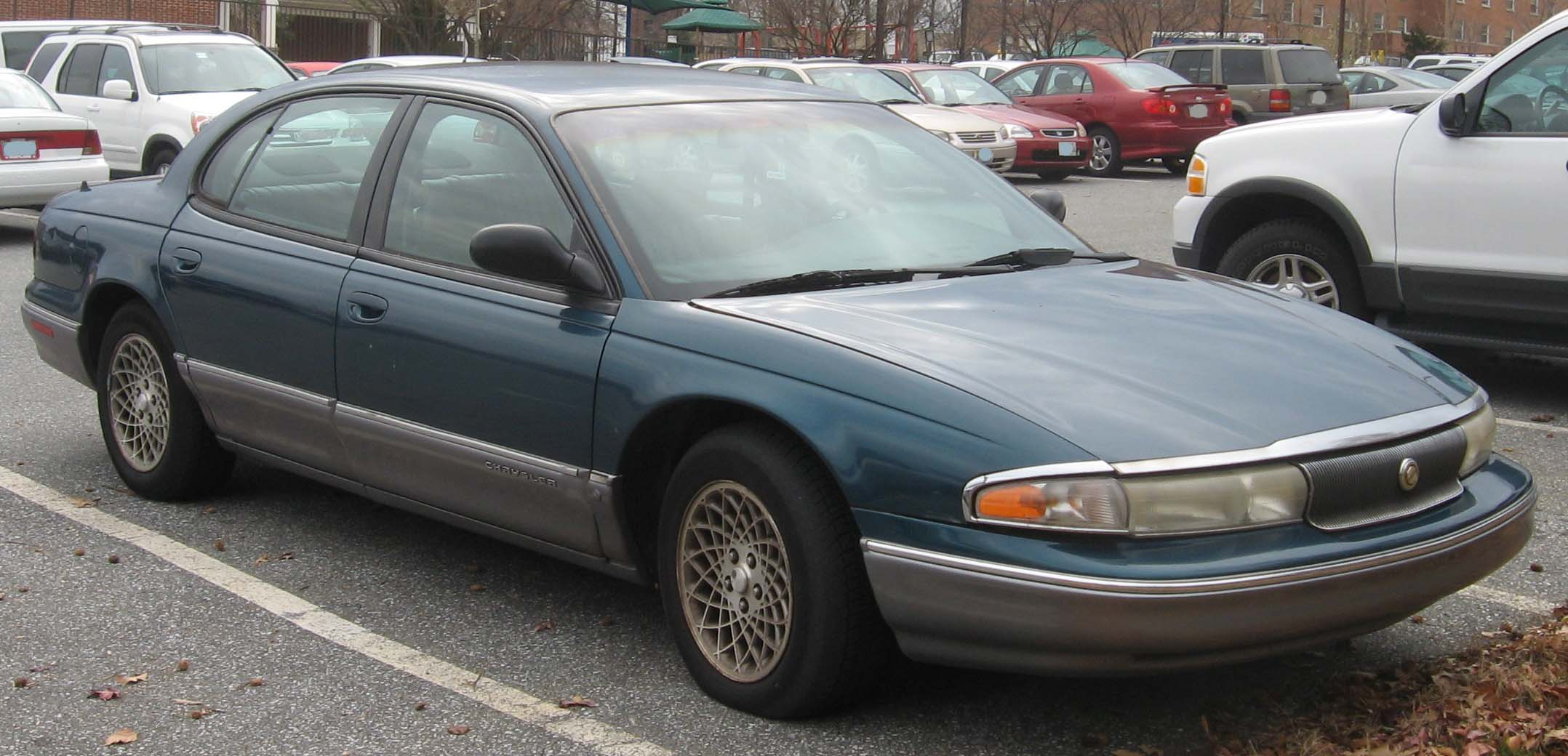
1994–1996 New Yorker

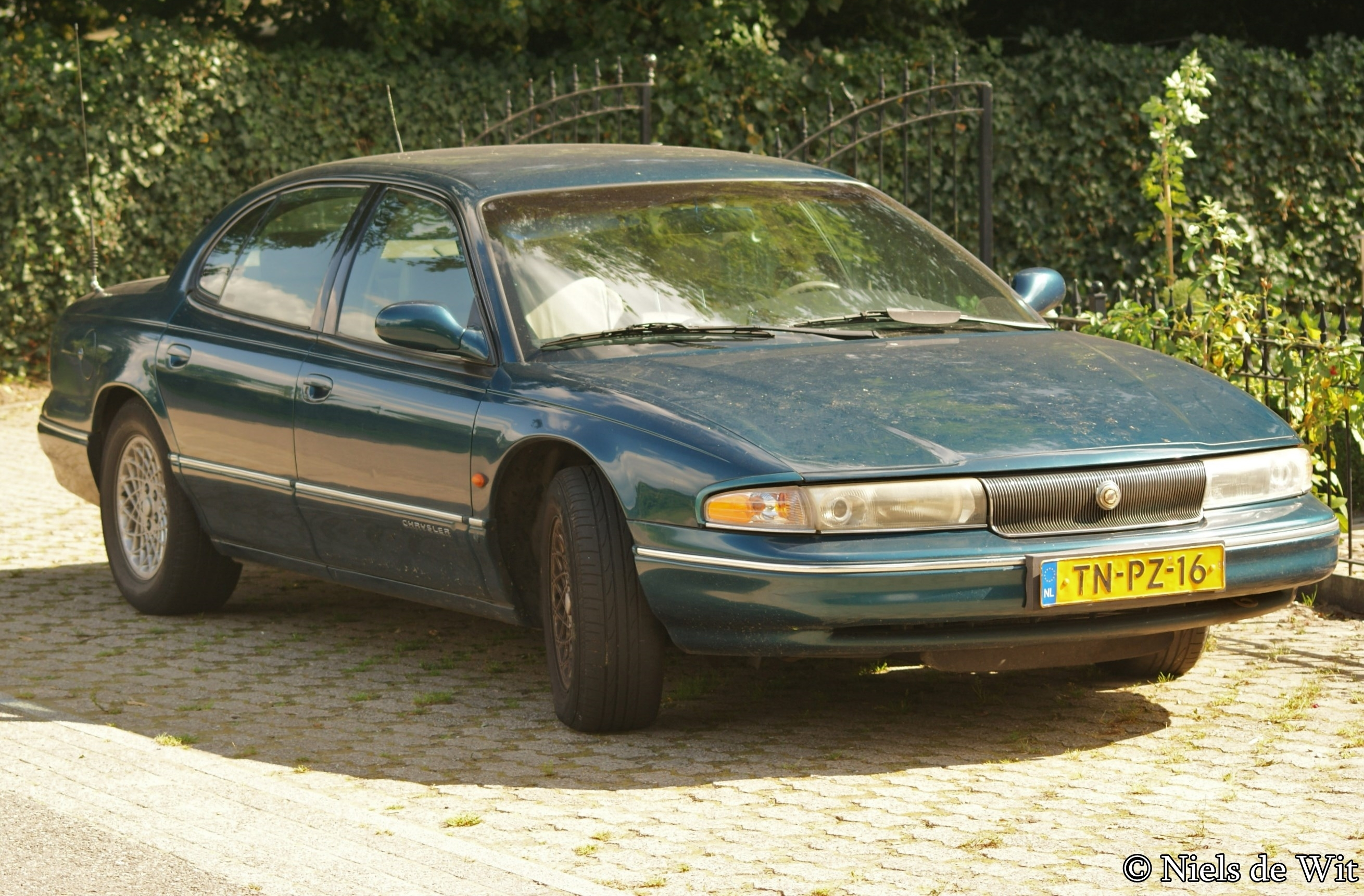
1998 New Yorker (Europe)

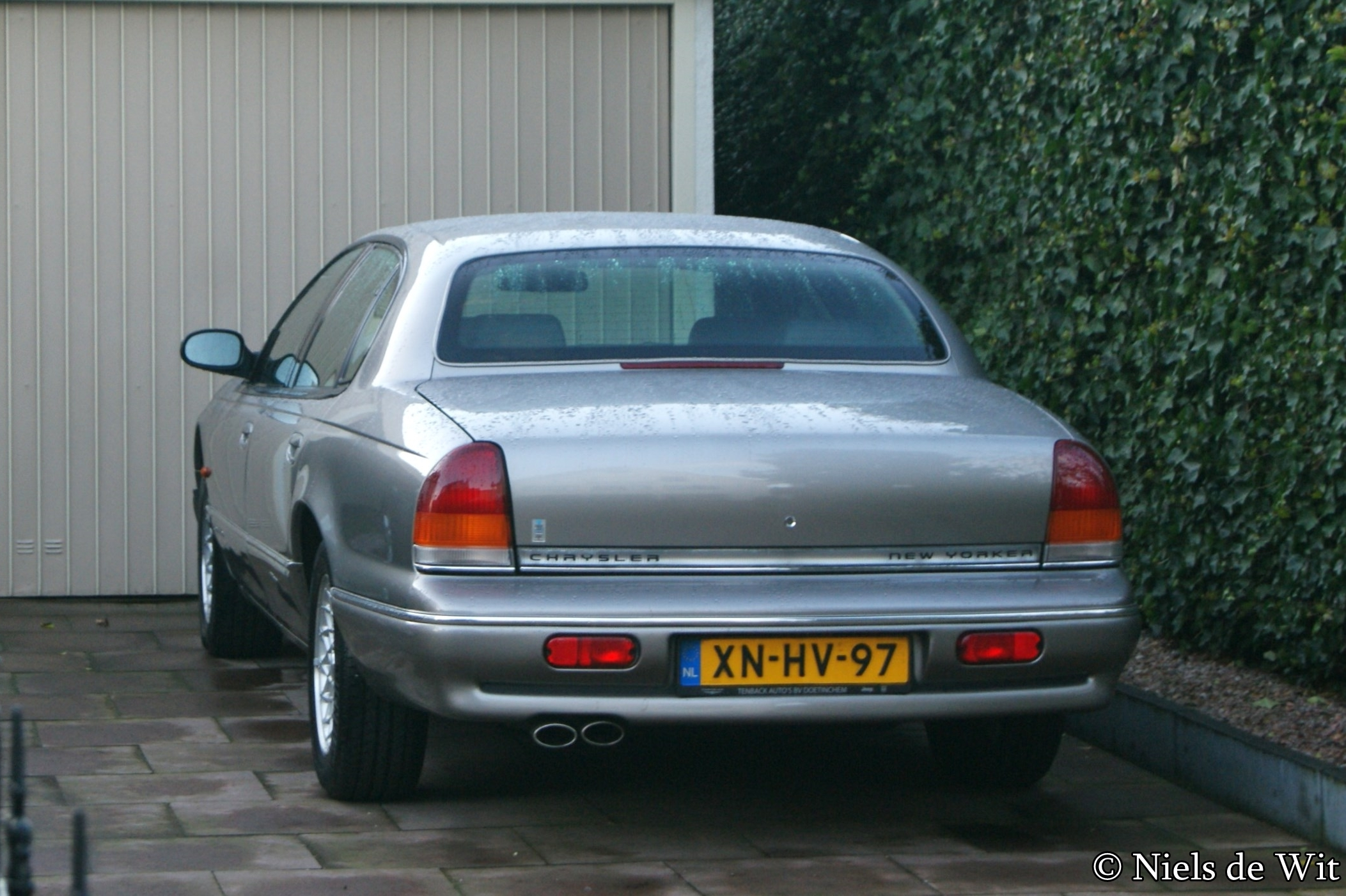
1999 New Yorker rear view

=== LH design background ===
The fourteenth and final generation New Yorker's design can be traced to 1986, when designer Kevin Verduyn completed the initial exterior design of a new aerodynamic concept sedan called "Navajo". The design never passed the clay model stage.

It was also at this time that the Chrysler Corporation purchased bankrupt Italian sports car manufacturer Lamborghini. The Navajo's exterior design was reworked and became the Lamborghini Portofino, released as a concept at the 1987 Frankfurt Auto Show. The Portofino was heralded as a design triumph, setting in motion Chrysler's decision to produce a production sedan with the Portofino's revolutionary exterior design, called "cab-forward". The cab forward design was characterized by the long, low slung windshield, and relatively short overhangs. The wheels were effectively pushed to the corners of the car, creating a much larger passenger cabin than the contemporaries of the time.

Design of the chassis began in the late 1980s, after Chrysler had bought another automaker: American Motors Corporation (AMC) in 1987. During this time, Chrysler began designing the replacement for the Dodge Dynasty and Chrysler Fifth Avenue, as well as a potential Plymouth. The initial design of Dodge's LH bore resemblance to the Dynasty, and this design was scrapped entirely after François Castaing, former vice president of product engineering and development at AMC, became Chrysler's vice president of vehicle engineering in 1988. Under Castaing's leadership, the new design began with the Eagle Premier, also sold later as the Dodge Monaco. The Premier's longitudinal engine mounting layout was inherited, as was the front suspension geometry, and parts of the braking system. The chassis itself became a flexible architecture capable of supporting front or rear-wheel drive (designated "LH" and "LX" respectively). The chassis design was continually refined throughout the following years, as it underpinned more Chrysler prototypes: the 1989 Chrysler Millennium and 1990 Eagle Optima.

The transmission was inspired by the Eagle Premier's ZF automatic. However, it borrowed heavily from Chrysler's A604 (41TE) "Ultradrive" transversely mounted automatic, it became the A606 (also known as 42LE). This Ultradrive transmission, however, was not without critics; on January 25, 1991, The New York Times reported that Consumers Union would publish a warning for consumers to not purchase a vehicle with this "Ultradrive" transmission in the February 1991 issue of Consumer Reports magazine, citing poor reliability and safety hazards. By 1990, it was decided that the new technologically advanced car would need a new technologically advanced engine to power it. Until that time, the only engine confirmed for use was Chrysler's 3.3 L pushrod V6, which would be used in the three original LH cars, the Intrepid, Vision, and Concorde, in base form. The 3.3 L engine's 60° block was bored out to 3.5 L, while the pushrod-actuated valves were replaced with SOHC cylinder heads with four valves per cylinder, creating an advanced 3.5 L V6 optional in the three smaller cars, but standard in LHS and New Yorker.

The general LH appearance, still based on the cab forward exterior design of the 1987 Lamborghini Portofino concept, with its aerodynamic shape, made for little wind noise inside this large car. This sleek styling gives the LH cars a low drag coefficient, which was ahead of its time. The New Yorker featured a more monochromatic design inside and out (but less so than its LHS sibling, which had very little chrome trim), and aluminum wheels with a Spiralcast design. The single color motif was more pronounced on models without the grey lower cladding.

Upscale New Yorker models feature leather-trimmed seats, steering wheel, shift knob, and door inserts. Passenger comforts include rear center rear armrest, and 8-way power seats for both the driver and passenger, as well as personal reading lamps. Power windows and central door locks were standard, as was climate control with air conditioning, and cruise control. remote keyless entry available as an option, as was a remote activated alarm, an overhead console with a computer, power moonroof, and alloy wheels. The best stock audio options found in New Yorker are the Infinity sound systems having eight speakers positioned throughout the cabin along with an equalizer. Head units include a radio with either cassette or CD playback, and up to a five-band adjustable graphic equalizer, with joystick balance and fade control. Standard safety features included dual front airbags, anti-lock brakes (ABS), and traction control.

Dual-way power sunroofs were available on this car. They were designed and installed by American Sunroof Company (now ASC Global) from its plant in Columbus, Ohio, not by Mopar itself. An installed sunroof eliminated most of the front overhead console that featured storage bins for a garage door opener and sunglasses. However, the Overhead Travel Information System (OTIS), or onboard computer with integrated map lights, was retained.

=== LHS ===
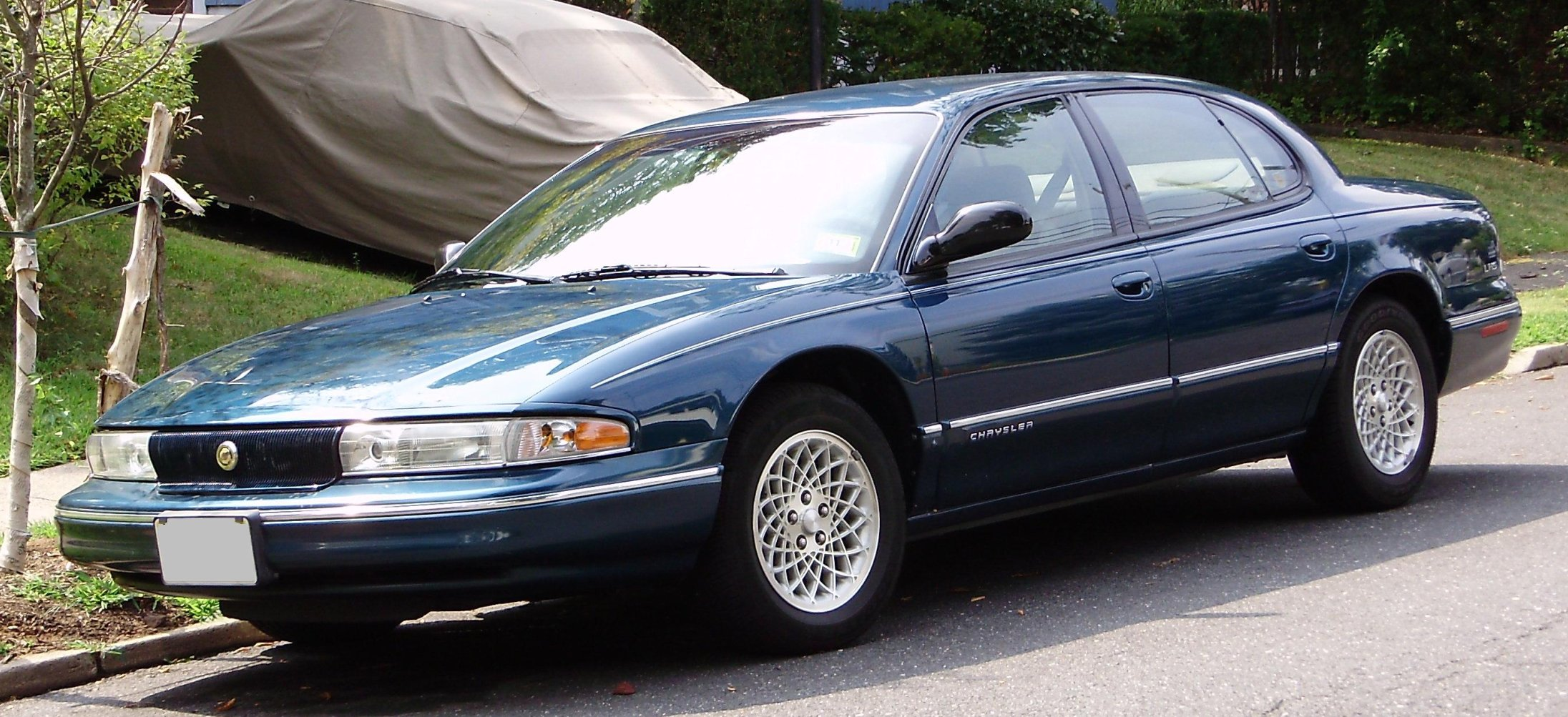
Chrysler LHS

The five-passenger Chrysler LHS was differentiated from its New Yorker counterpart by a floor console and shifter, five-passenger seating, lack of chrome trim, an upgraded interior, and a sportier image. After a short 1996 production run, the New Yorker was dropped in favor of a six-passenger option on the 1996-1997 LHS. The LHS received a minor face change in 1995, when the corporate-wide Pentastar emblem was replaced with the revived Chrysler brand emblem.

New Yorker Production

Production Figures
Year	Units
1994	34,283
1995	23,624
1996	3,295
Total Production = 61,202

== Works cited ==
- Lee, John (1990). Standard Catalog of Chrysler, 1924-1990. Iola, WI: Krause Publications. ISBN 0-87341-142-0.
