= Chrysler Cordoba =

Car model produced by Chrysler Corporation

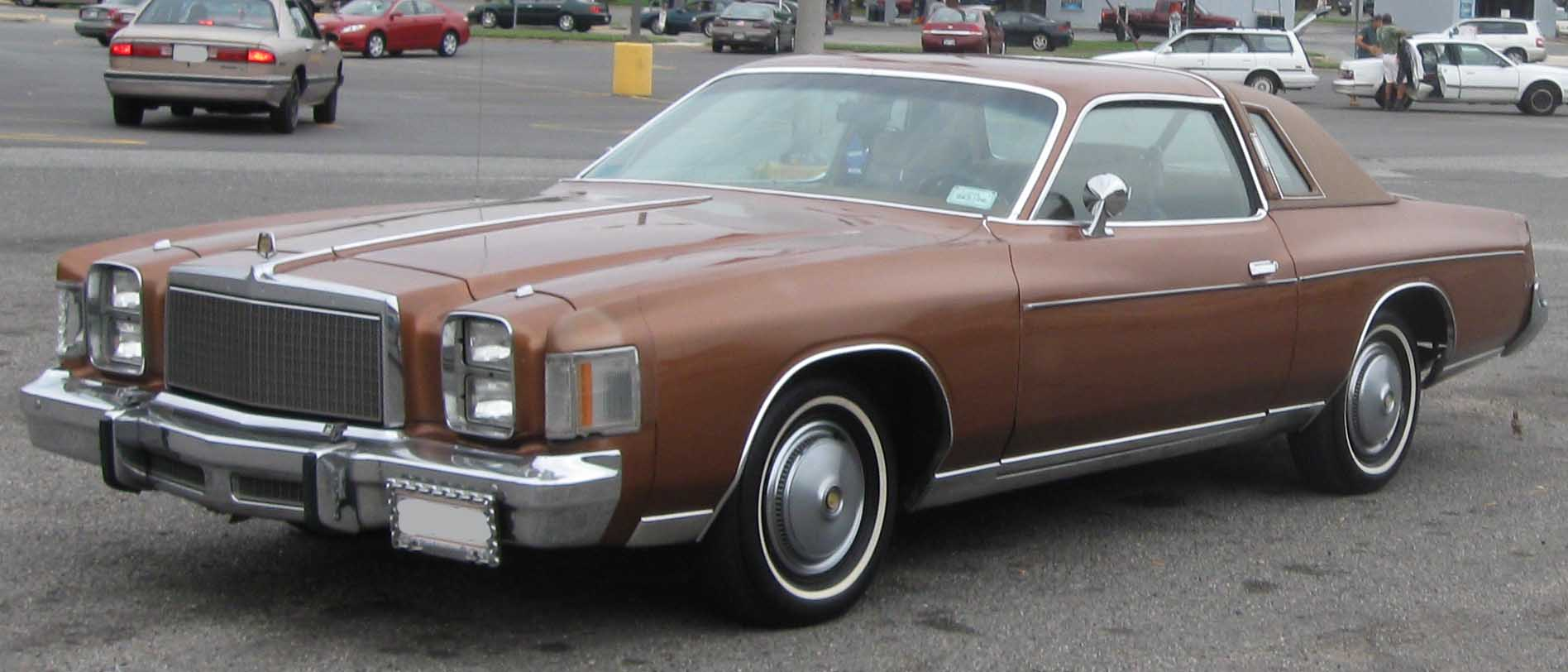
- 1978 Chrysler Cordoba

Overview
- Manufacturer: Chrysler Corporation
- Model years: 1970; 1975–1983
- Assembly: Windsor Assembly, Windsor, Ontario, Canada

Body and chassis
- Class: Personal luxury car
- Body style: 2-door coupe
- Layout: FR layout

Chronology
- Predecessor: Chrysler 300 (1971)
- Successor: Chrysler Laser

The Chrysler Cordoba is a full-sized luxury car based on the Chrysler Newport that was first introduced during the 1970 model year. The nameplate was then applied to an intermediate-sized two-door personal luxury car starting with the 1975 model year. The name was also used on a show car exhibited in 1970. The Cordoba was manufactured by Chrysler in North America over two generations until the 1983 model year.

The personal luxury version was the company's first model produced specifically for that market segment and the first Chrysler-branded vehicle smaller than full-size. The name was taken from the Spanish city of Córdoba, Spain.

== Background ==
In the early 1960s, when other upmarket brands were expanding into smaller cars with such models as the Mercury Comet and Buick Skylark, Chrysler publicly declared that there would "never" be a smaller Chrysler. The 1962 full line catalog proclaims on the rear cover: "There's not a jr. edition in the whole family!". The 1963 Chrysler prestige catalog described the New Yorker models as having "no jr. edition car."

== Cordoba de Oro concept ==
Chrysler developed a concept car, the Cordoba de Oro, which was shown at the 1970 Chicago Auto Show. Designed by Chrysler’s design chief, Elwood Engel, the show car was future-oriented with an angular wedge-shaped body that later evolved into the “fuselage aesthetic." Its advanced features included a cantilevered roof with no A-pillars between the windshield and the side windows, as well as a thermostatically controlled air intake with horizontal experimental headlights inside the grille.

== 1970 Newport Cordoba ==
The Chrysler Newport Cordoba name was introduced in the spring of 1970 as a specially trimmed individual model based on the Chrysler Newport available in either two-door or four-door hardtop body designs. This full-size model was a "limited edition luxury car, designed to introduce you to Chrysler" and consisted of an exclusive "Cordoba Gold" paint with matching wheels, wheel covers, and grille fascia, the side molding had textured vinyl inserts, an "Espanol" vinyl roof cover featured a distinctive pattern, and the hood ornament included an "Aztec" eagle. The Aztec motif continued into the interior with textured antique gold vinyl seats and door panels as well as special dash and glovebox appliqué. Chrysler marketing described these as a "quiet Spanish motif".

Included in the US$3,769 (equivalent to $31,247 in 2025) base price were the 383 cu in (6.3 L) 200 hp (149 kW; 203 PS) two-barrel carburetor V8 along with a special gold vinyl roof as well as the exterior and interior Axtec trim. Adding an automatic transmission, power steering, H78x15 fiberglass-belted whitewall tires, and a "golden tone" AM radio raised the price to $4,241.65. A total of 3,741 Newport Cordobas were produced for 1970, of which 1,868 were two-door hardtops, and 1,873 were four-door hardtops.

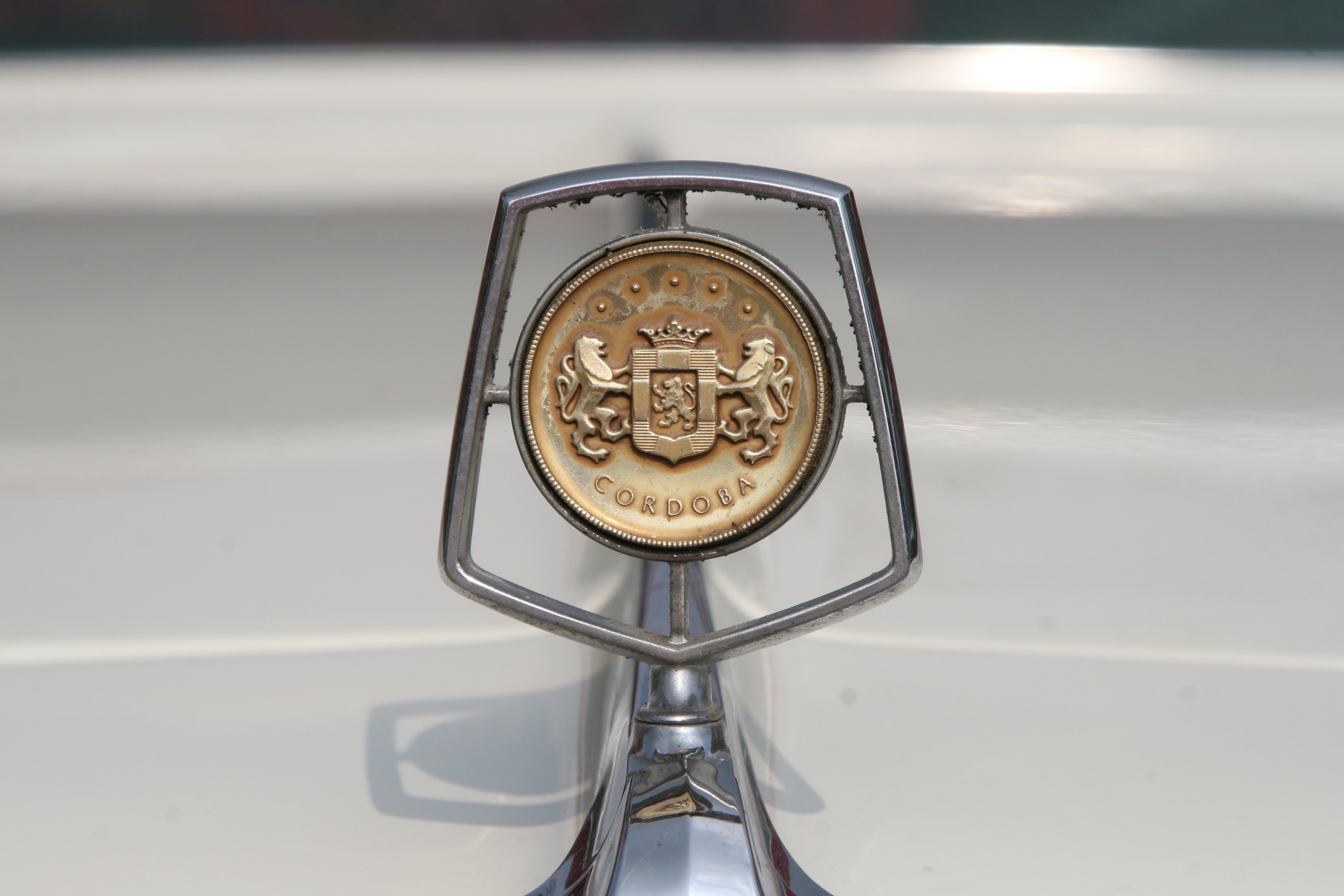
1975 Chrysler Cordoba hood ornament

== Development ==
Chrysler initially designed the 1974 Cordoba to be the all-new Plymouth Sebring for 1975, which was to share bodies with the Dodge Charger SE. Instead, a decision was made to position the model as a personal luxury car and introduce it as the first small Chrysler. The Cordoba was available with smaller, more economical engines than other Chryslers, and rode on a 115 in (2,921 mm) wheelbase, 9 in (229 mm) less than its next largest sibling.

Córdoba is the name of a city in Spain, which was intended to evoke some noteworthy meaning with customers. However, the only thing remotely Hispanic about Chrysler Cordoba was its name. Even the car's emblem is a stylized version of the Argentine cordoba coin, and there is also a Córdoba Province, Argentina.

The marketing theme was also carried out with the somewhat baroque trim inside the vehicle. The first spokesperson for the car was Richard Basehart; however, Chrysler secured movie and television actor Ricardo Montalbán as the car's advertising spokesman through its entire run. Notable was his eloquent praise of its "rich Corinthian leather" interior.

Chrysler had previously sought to evoke a Spanish exotic flair in their products when they introduced the 1929 DeSoto Six with model names of "cupe", "coche" and "de Lujo", or Spanish for "coupe", "coach", and "deluxe", while the roadster was called the "Roadster Espanol".

The single-body style coupe model was one of Chrysler's few genuine successes during the 1970s. At a time when the automaker was teetering on bankruptcy, demand for Cordobas exceeded supply for its first years, with the production of over 150,000 units for the inaugural 1975 models, and the highest number built in 1977, with 183,000 units. Half of the Chrysler division production during this period (and occasionally more) was composed of Cordobas. This model helped to revive the division. The model combined "just the right amount of amount of neoclassic styling with the prestige of the Chrysler nameplate."

== First generation (1975–1979) ==
First generation
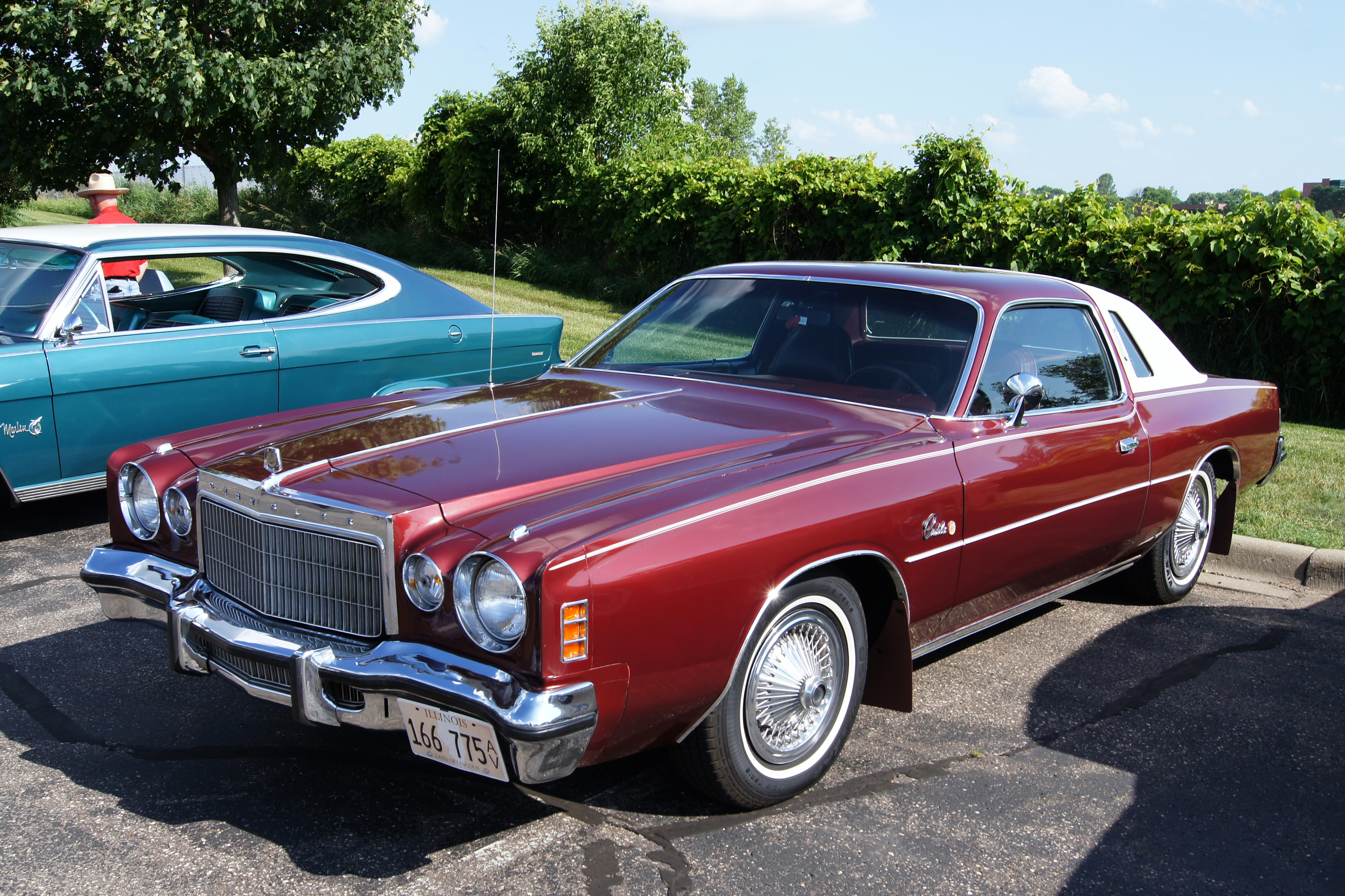
- 1975 Chrysler Cordoba

Overview
- Production: 1974–1979
- Model years: 1975–1979

Body and chassis
- Platform: B-body
- Related: Chrysler 300 (1970 only); Dodge Charger, Dodge Coronet, Dodge Magnum, Dodge Monaco, Plymouth Fury

Powertrain
- Engine: 318 cu in (5.2 L) LA V8; 360 cu in (5.9 L) LA V8; 400 cu in (6.6 L) B V8
- Transmission: 3-speed A727 automatic

Dimensions
- Wheelbase: 115 in (2,921 mm)
- Length: 215.3 in (5,469 mm)
- Width: 77.1 in (1,958 mm)
- Height: 52.6 in (1,336 mm)

The Cordoba was introduced by Chrysler for the 1975 model year as an upscale personal luxury car, competing with the Oldsmobile Cutlass, Buick Regal, and Mercury Cougar. However, the Cordoba was initially intended to be marketed under the Plymouth marque. Model names Mirada, Premier, Sebring, and Grand Era were associated during the development project. All except Grand Era would be used on later Chrysler, Dodge, and Eagle vehicles, though only the Dodge Mirada would be related to the Cordoba. However, losses from the newly introduced full-size C-body models due to the 1973 oil crisis encouraged Chrysler executives to seek higher profits by marketing the model under the more upscale Chrysler brand.

The car was a success, with over 150,000 units sold in 1975, a sales year that was otherwise dismal for the company. Gauges, except the tachometer, were standard. For the 1976 model year, sales increased slightly to 165,000. The mildly revised 1977 version also sold well, with just under 140,000 cars. The success of using the Chrysler nameplate strategy is contrasted to the far fewer sales of its similar and somewhat cheaper corporate cousin, the Dodge Charger SE.

Interiors were more luxurious than the Dodge Charger SE and much more than the top-line standard intermediates (Plymouth Fury, Dodge Coronet) with a velour cloth notchback bench seat and folding armrest standard. Optionally available were bucket seats upholstered in Corinthian leather with a center armrest and cushion, or, at extra cost, a center console with floor shifter and storage compartment. The dashboard and door panels featured simulated burled elm trim and metal stampings in 1975, while the 1976 through 1979 models featured simulated rosewood trim. A 60/40 bench seat was introduced in 1976, and other seating/upholstery options were added each year through 1979. The first-generation B-body Cordoba was very opulent for the price.

The original design endured only minor changes for three years before various factors contributed to a decline in sales. For 1978, there was a modest restyling with the then-popular rectangular headlights in a stacked configuration (the Dodge Charger SE kept its round headlamps for 1978 rather than the rectangular stacked design of the Cordoba). A Chrysler designer, Jeffrey Godshall, wrote in Collectible Automobile magazine that this restyling was viewed as "somewhat tacky" and eliminated much of the visual appeal that 1975 through 1977 Cordobas had been known for. The restyle also made the car appear heavier than the predecessor versions at a time when other cars in this class were being downsized to smaller dimensions such as the Ford Thunderbird in 1977 as well as the Chevrolet Monte Carlo and Pontiac Grand Prix in 1978.

The Cordoba's sales decline in 1978 and 1979 could also be attributed to the introduction of the smaller Chrysler LeBaron in mid-1977 which was available in both sedan and coupe models and offered similar personal-luxury styling and options. At the same time, Chrysler's financial position and quality reputation were in steady decline. Rising gas prices and tightening fuel economy standards made the Cordoba's nearly 3,700 lb (1,700 kg) weight with 360 cu in (5.9 L) or 400 cu in (6.6 L) V8 engines obsolete.

For 1979 a $2,040 "300" option package was offered on the Cordoba, featuring an all-white exterior, "Chrysler 300"-style grille, and a four-barrel 360 V8 engine. The Chrysler 300 was advertised and marketed as a separate model, not as a "Cordoba 300."

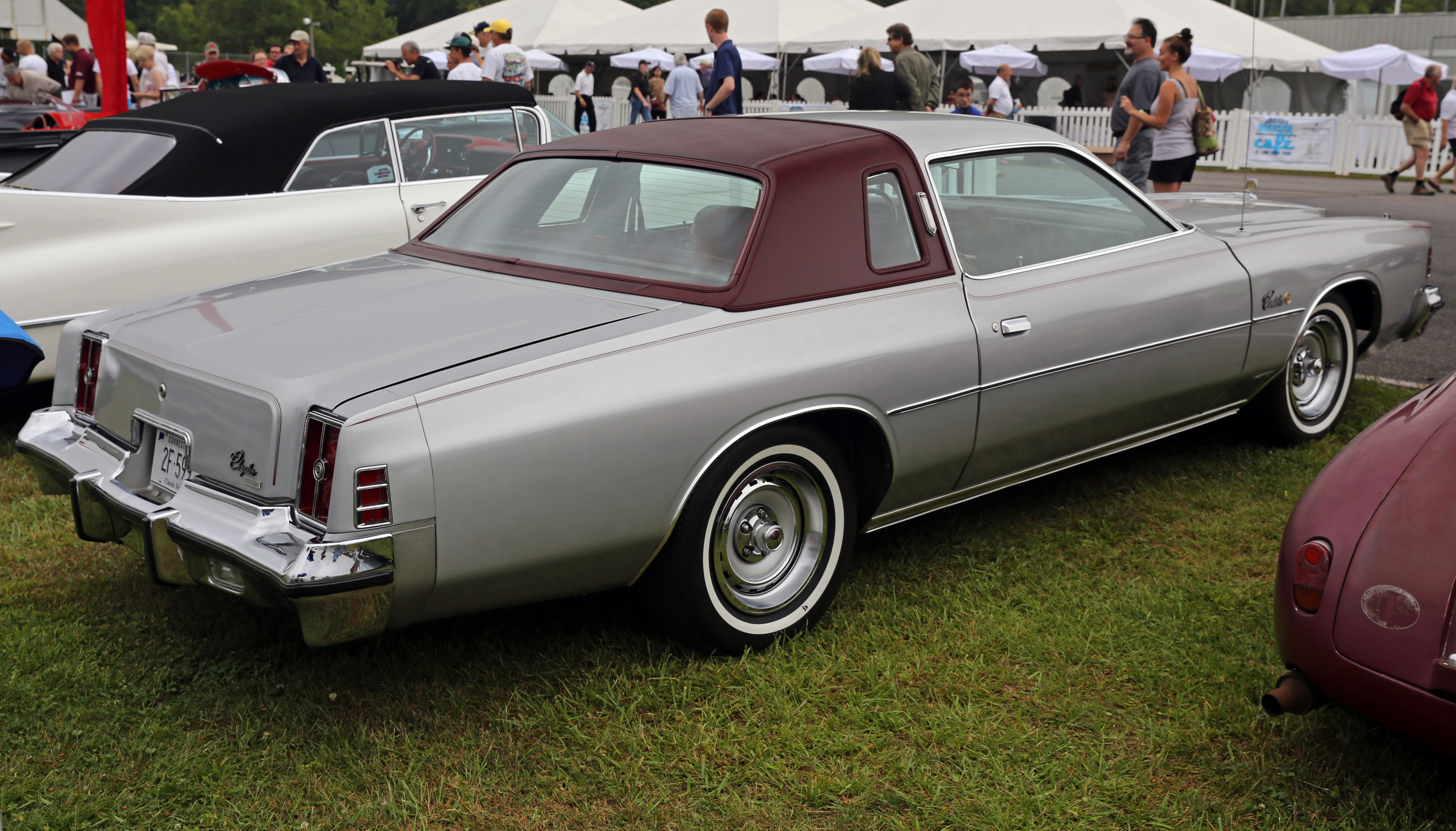
1975 Chrysler Cordoba

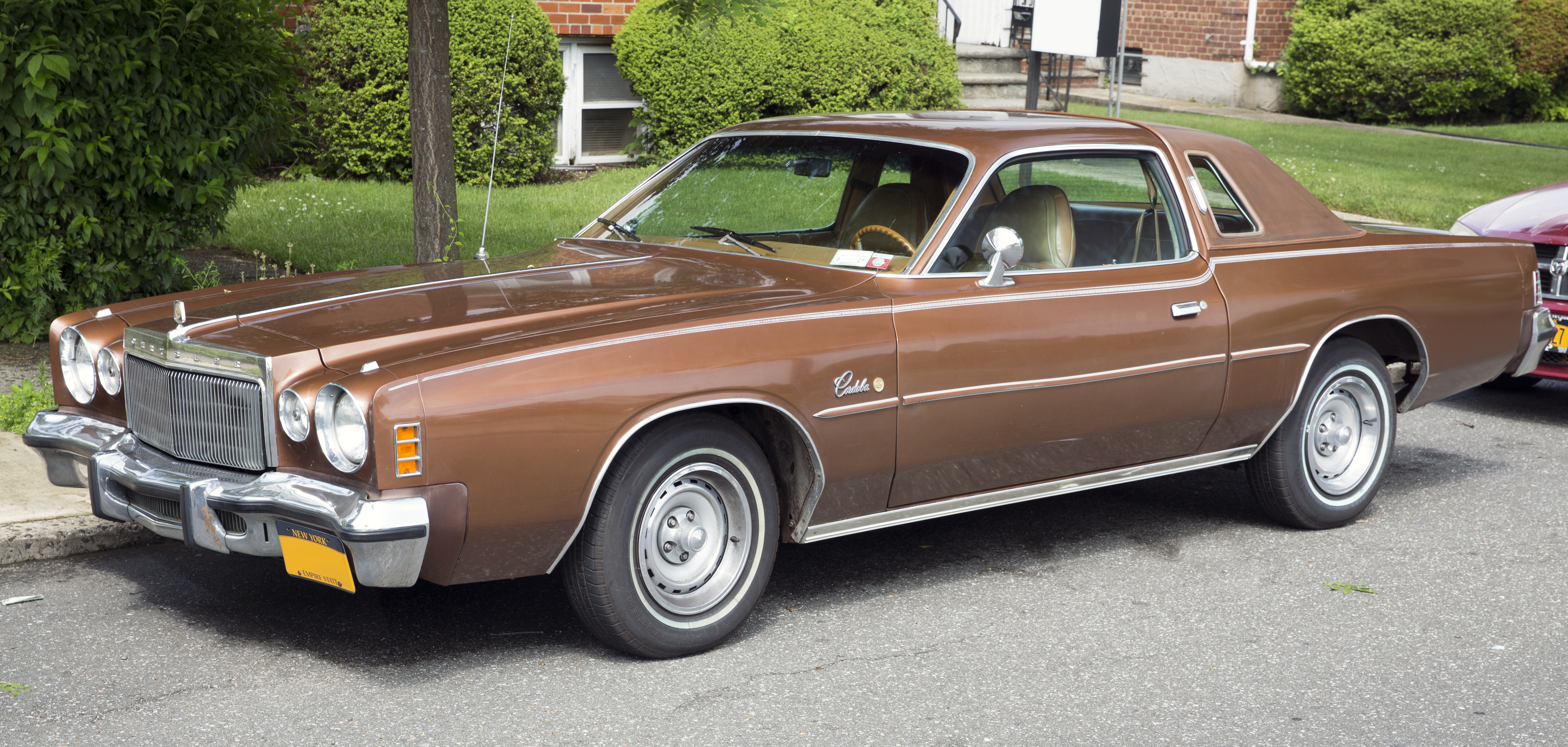
1976 Chrysler Cordoba

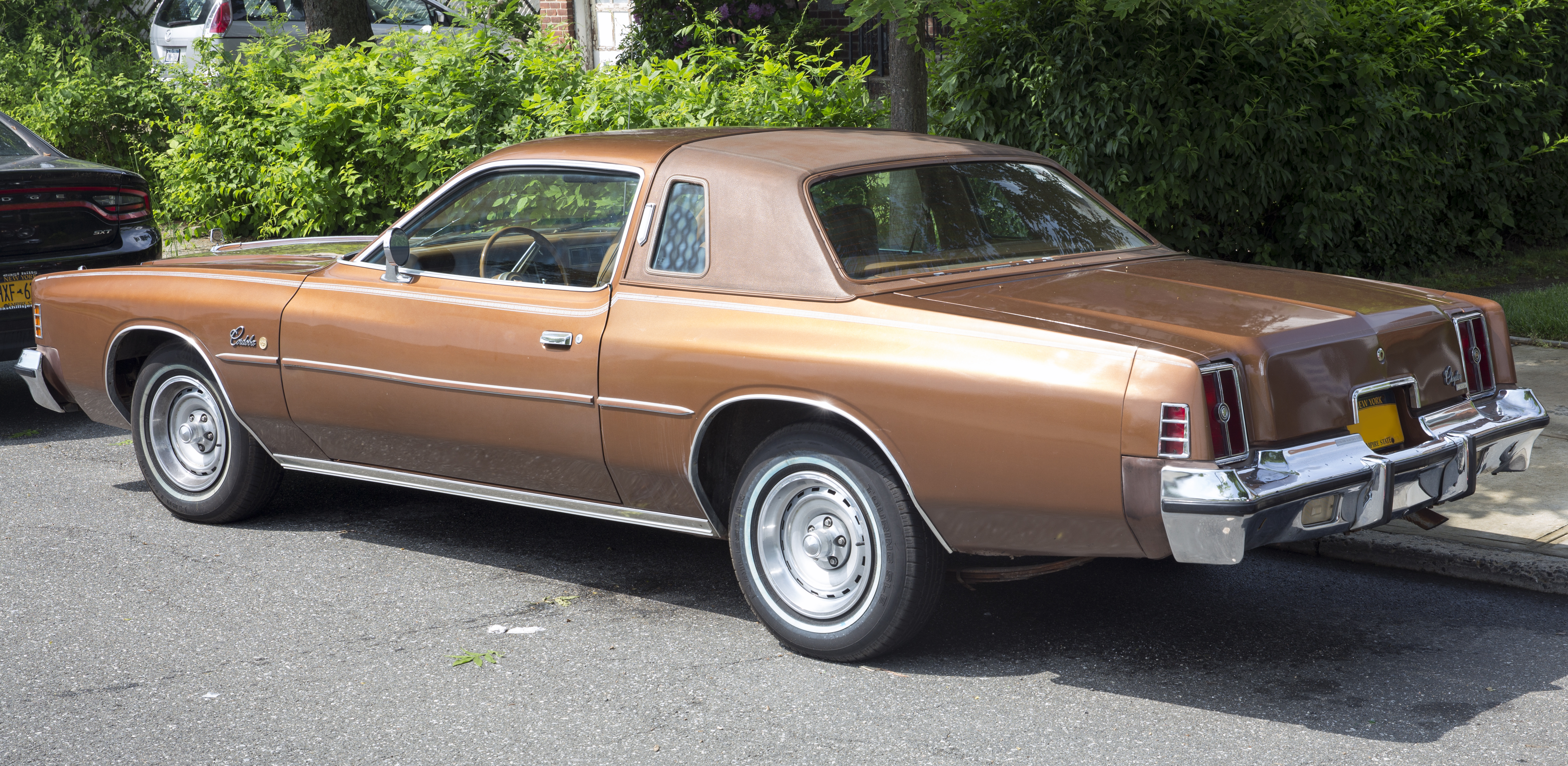
1976 Chrysler Cordoba

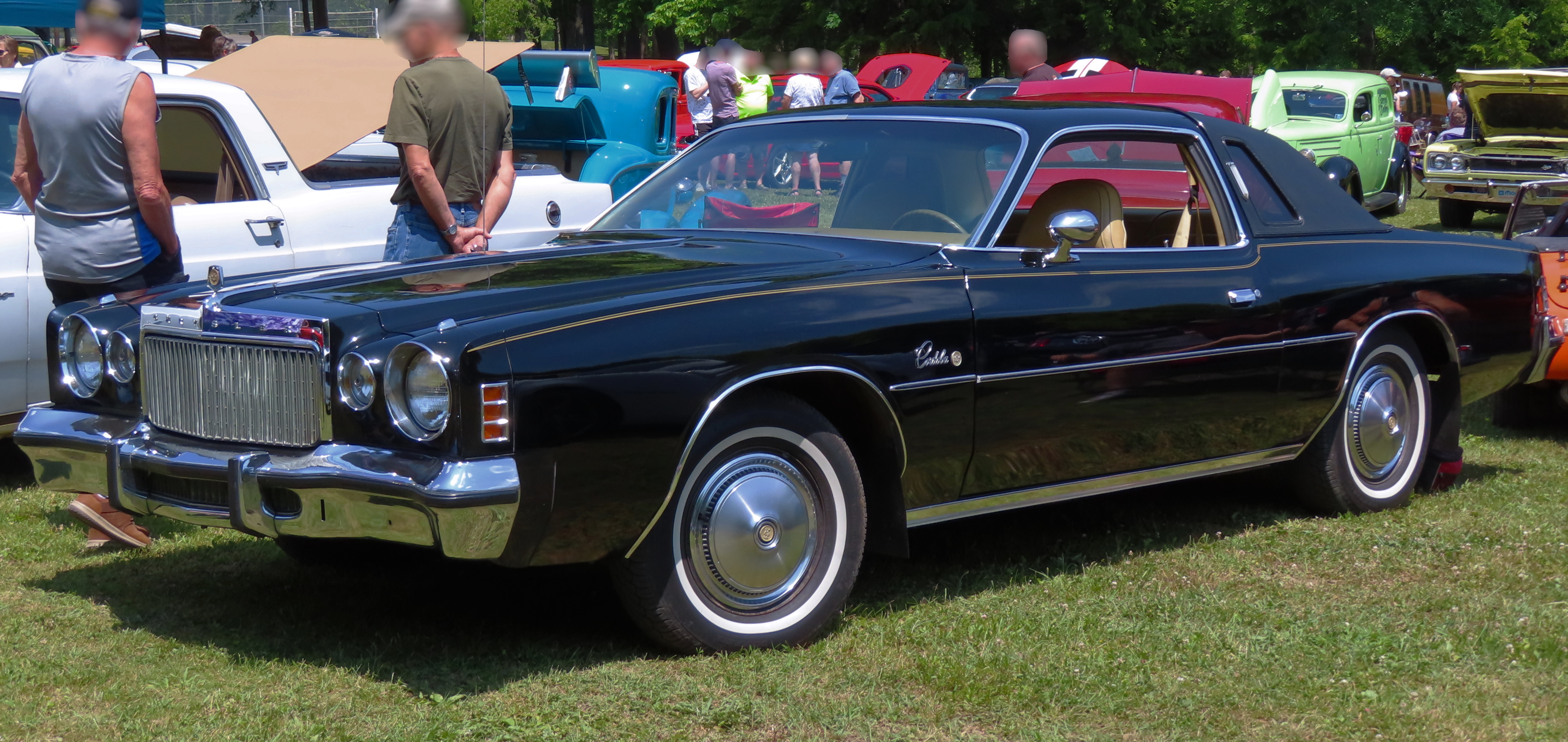
1977 Chrysler Cordoba

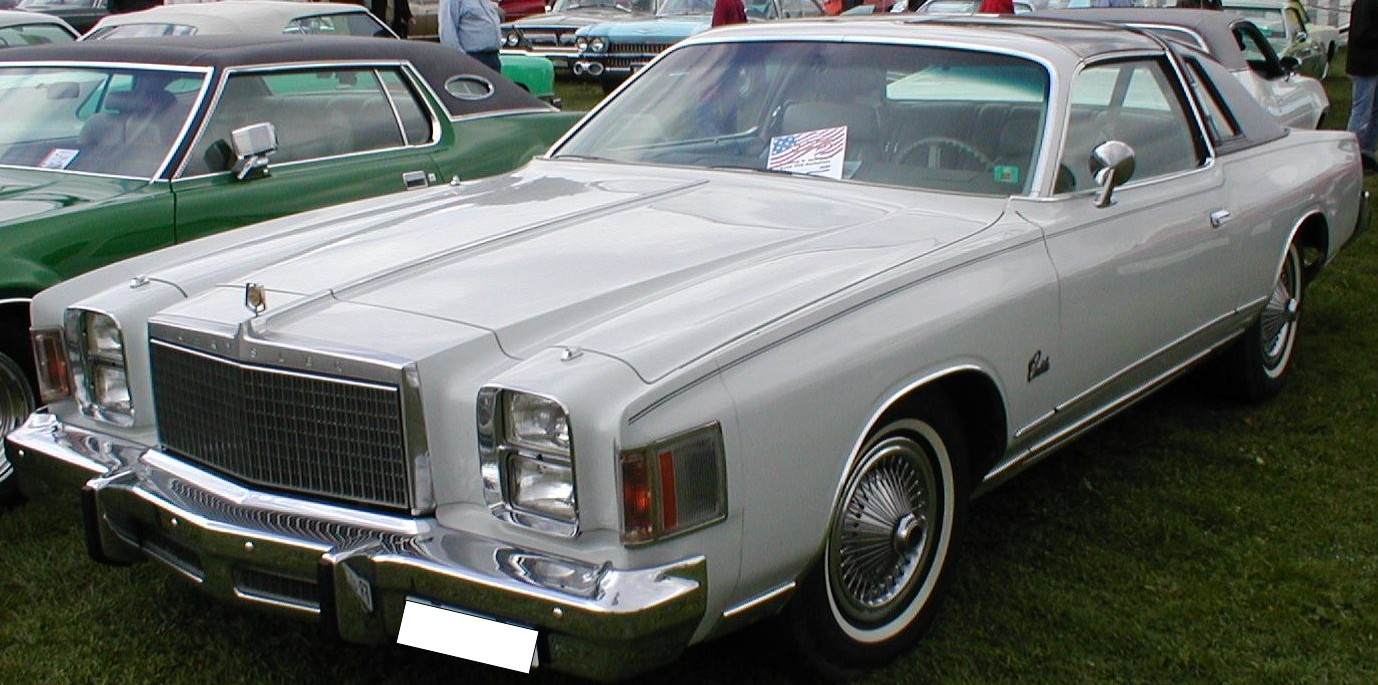
1978 Chrysler Cordoba

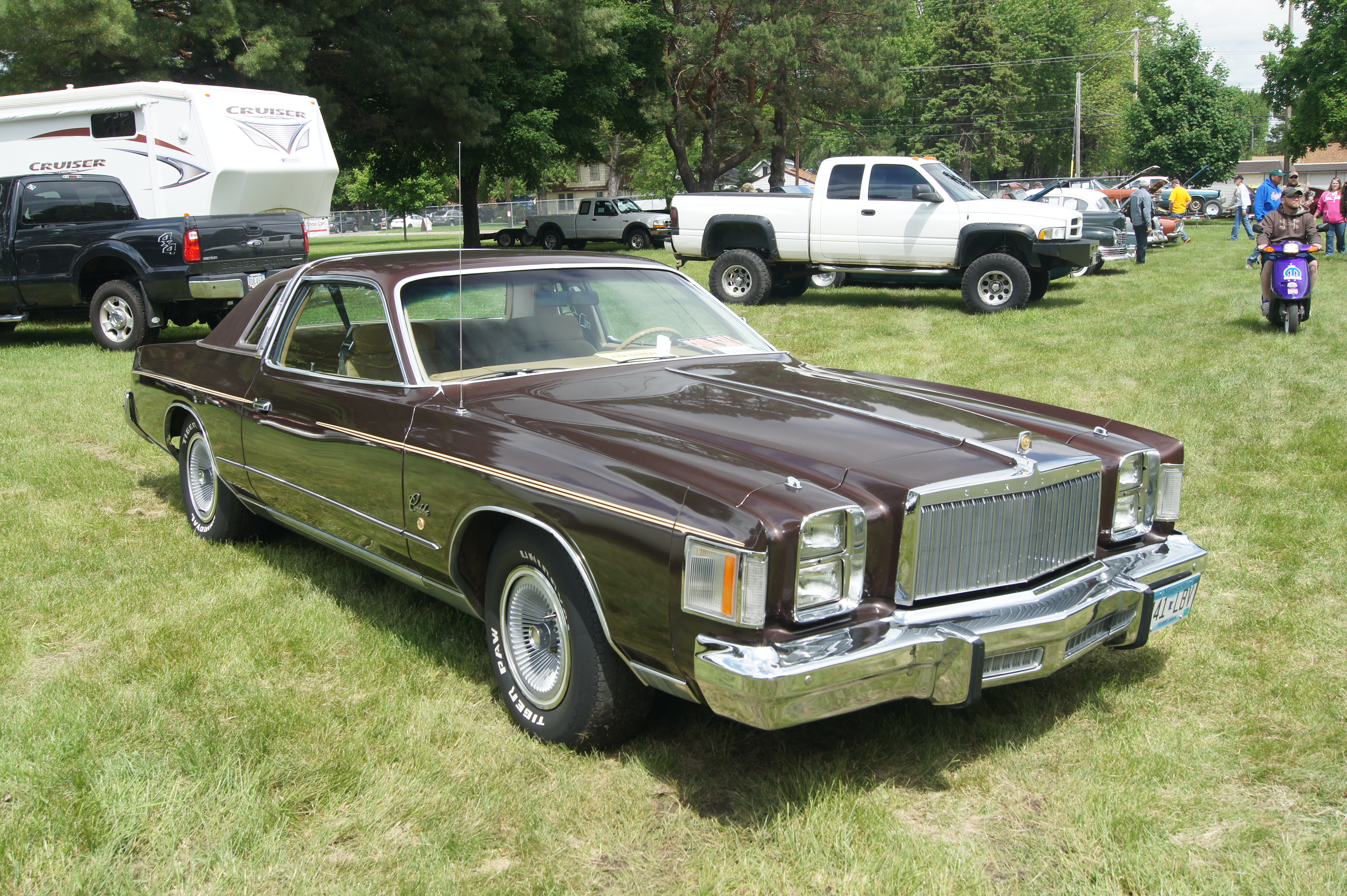
1979 Chrysler Cordoba

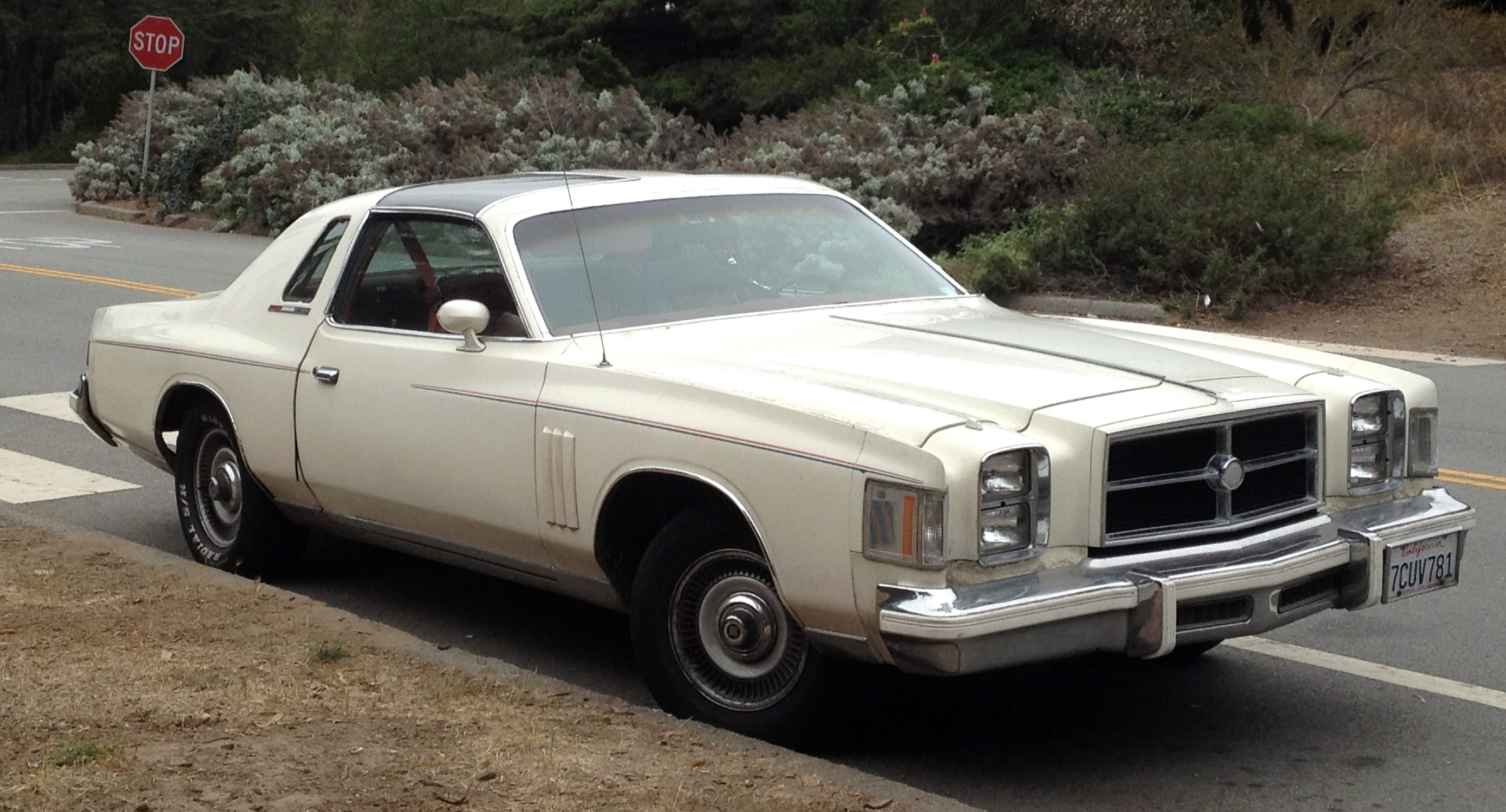
1979 Chrysler Cordoba with "300" option package

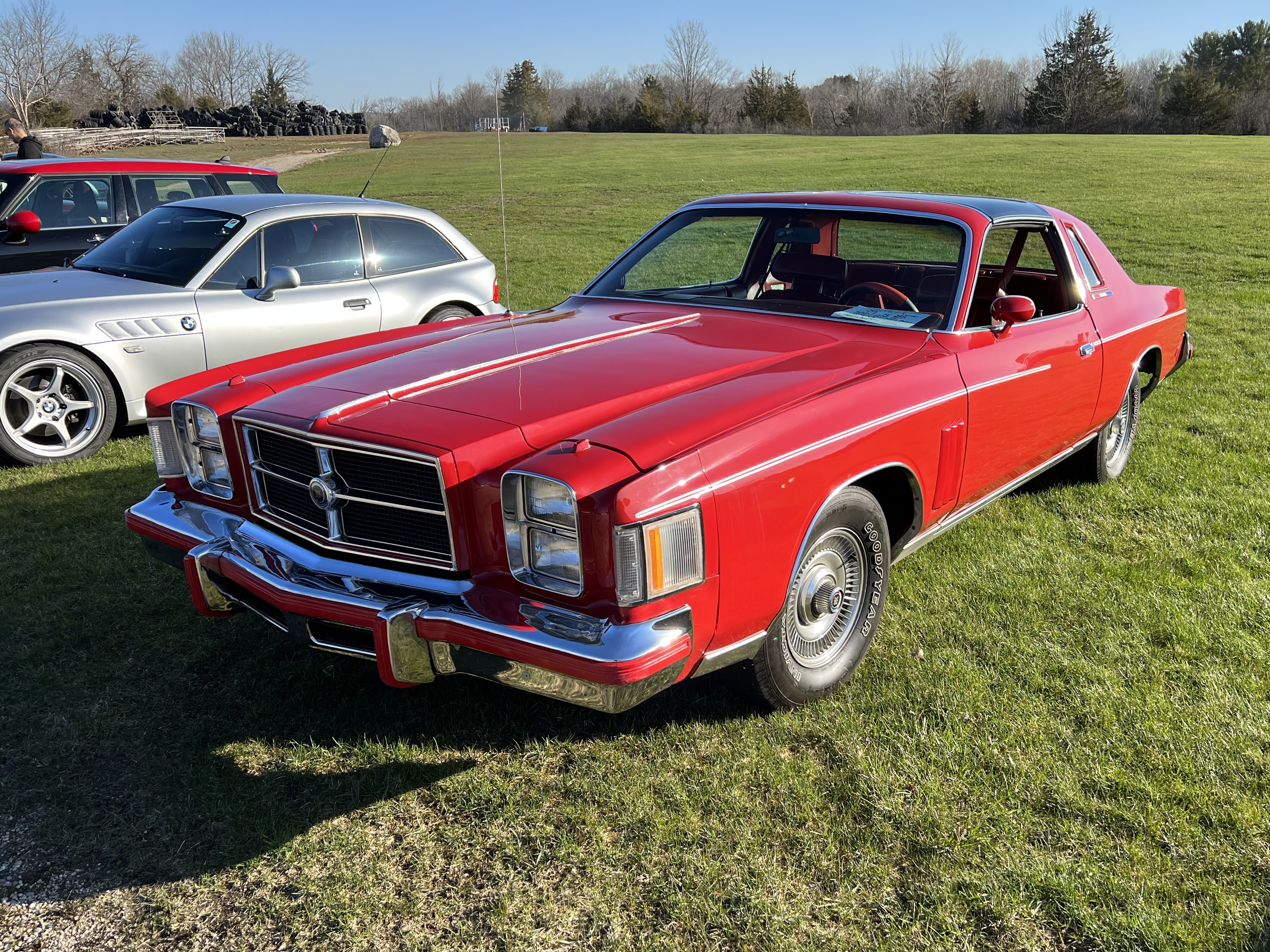
1979 Chrysler Cordoba with "300" option package (Canada only red variant)

== Second generation (1980–1983) ==
Second generation
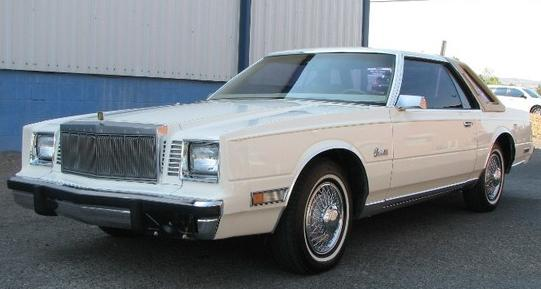
- 1980 Chrysler Cordoba

Overview
- Production: 1979–1983
- Model years: 1980–1983

Body and chassis
- Platform: J-body
- Related: Dodge Mirada; Imperial Series YS coupe

Powertrain
- Engine: 225 cu in (3.7 L) Slant 6 I6; 318 cu in (5.2 L) LA V8 V8; 360 cu in (5.9 L) (1980 Only)
- Transmission: 3-speed A904 automatic

Dimensions
- Wheelbase: 112.7 in (2,863 mm)
- Length: 209.8 in (5,329 mm) (1980); 210.1 in (5,337 mm) (1981); 209.6 in (5,324 mm) (LS)
- Width: 72.7 in (1,847 mm)
- Height: 53.3 in (1,354 mm) (1980–81); 53.2 in (1,351 mm) (1982–83)
- Curb weight: 3,446 lb (1,563 kg) (1980–81); 3,460 lb (1,569 kg) (1982); 3,467 lb (1,573 kg) (1983); 3,389 lb (1,537 kg) (LS 1981–82); 3,404 lb (1,544 kg) (LS 1983)

The Cordoba was downsized for the 1980 model year. The smaller, second-generation model used the J-platform dating to the 1976 F-body Plymouth Volaré, and its rebadged variant, the Dodge Mirada. Chrysler also revived the Imperial for 1981 as a third variant of the J-platform.

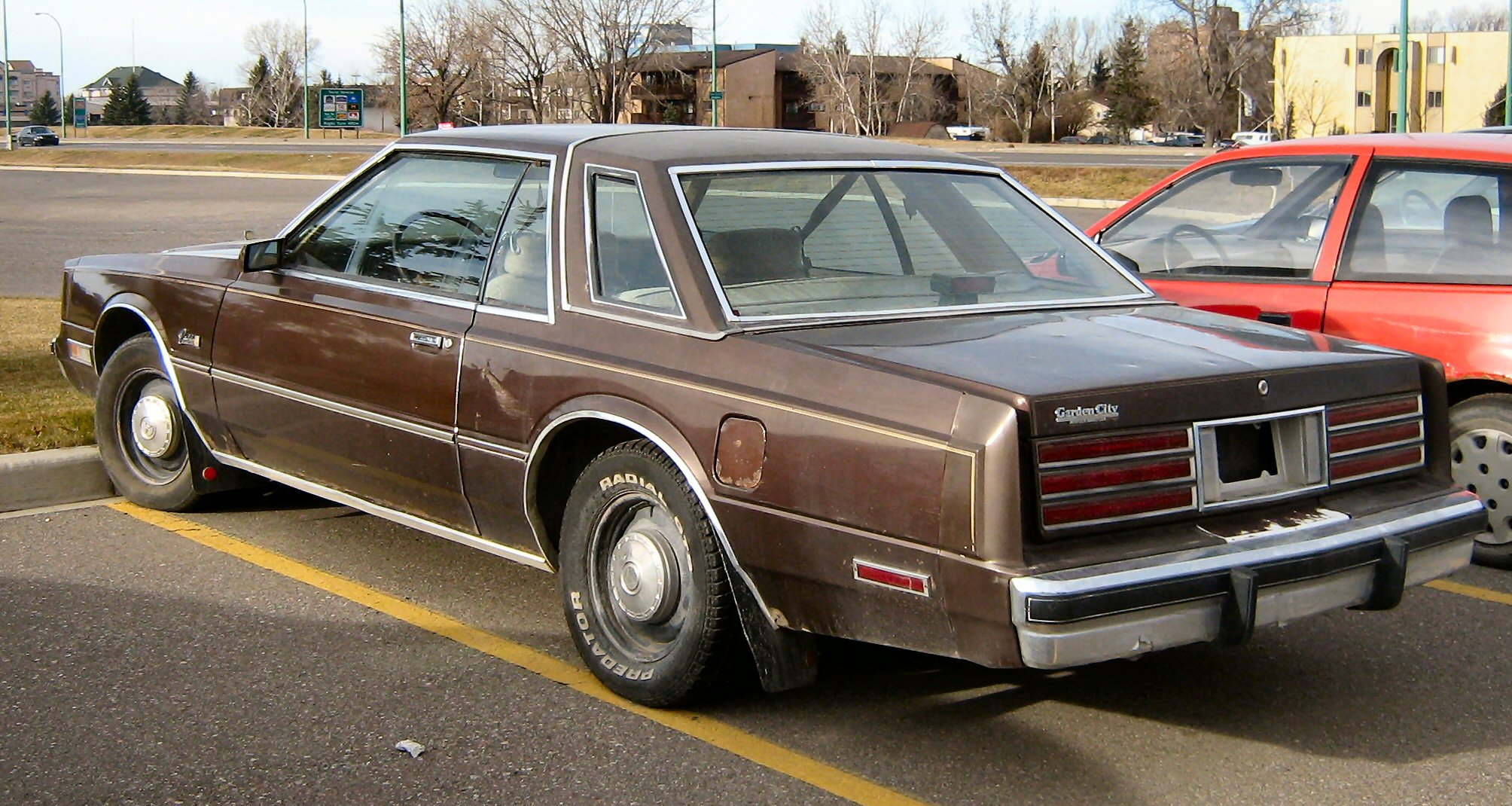
Rear view

The Cordoba and Mirada standard engine was the 225 cu in (3.7 L) Slant six rated at 95 hp (71 kW; 96 PS). The detuned 318 cu in (5.2 L) 130 hp (97 kW; 132 PS) V8 was an option (standard on the Imperial, with EFI), and the (code E58) 360 cu in (5.9 L) 185 hp (138 kW; 188 PS) V8. This higher-output option was not popular, with fewer than 100 cars ordered and was discontinued after the 1980 model year.

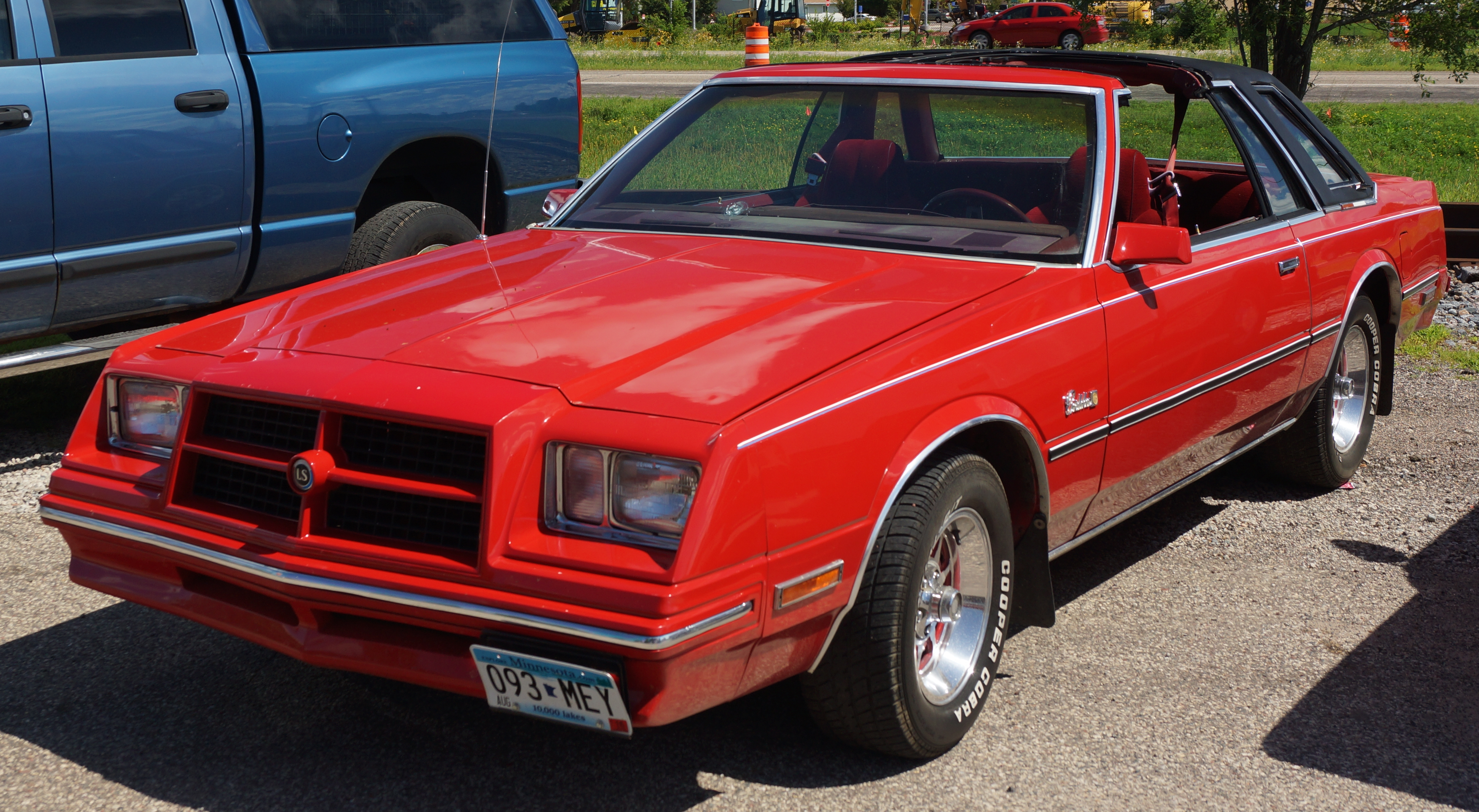
1981 Chrysler Cordoba LS

The 1980 and 1981 LS model (which was intended to be the "300") featured an aerodynamic-appearing nosecone (nearly identical to that on the Mirada) with a "crosshair" grille. Other features of this model were the deletion of the vinyl roof cover and a monotone color exterior.

The second-generation Cordoba sales were down substantially. The U.S. automobile industry's downsizing of vehicles also affected personal luxury models. For example, the Chevrolet Monte Carlo shrank in size in 1978 and the Ford Thunderbird was downsized for the 1980 model year.

With changes in the marketplace, Chrysler increasingly concentrated on its compact, front wheel drive models with four and six-cylinder engines. The Cordoba was discontinued in 1983.

=== Production figures ===
	Yearly Total
1980	46,406
1981	20,293
1982	14,898
1983	13,471
Total	95,068

=== Powertrains ===
The 225 cu in (3.7 L) Slant-6 was standard and the 318 cu in (5.2 L) V8 optional for the 1981 through 1983 model years.

engine displacement, type, carburetor type	max. motive power at rpm	max. torque at rpm	transmission
225 cu in (3,687 cc) Slant 6 I6; 1-barrel	90 bhp (67 kW; 91 PS) (1980); 85 bhp (63 kW; 86 PS) (1981–83) @ 3600	160 lb⋅ft (217 N⋅m) (1980); 165 lb⋅ft (224 N⋅m) (1981–83) @ 1600	3-speed A904 automatic
318 cu in (5,211 cc) LA V8; 2-barrel	120 bhp (89 kW; 122 PS) (1980); 130 bhp (97 kW; 132 PS) (1981–84) @ 3600	245 lb⋅ft (332 N⋅m) (1980); 230 lb⋅ft (312 N⋅m) (1981–83) @ 1600	3-speed A904 automatic

== NASCAR ==
Both the first- and second-generation Cordobas appeared in NASCAR. Ed Negre campaigned on occasion during the 1978 and 1979 seasons. Buddy Arrington ran a second-generation car in the 1982 through 1984 seasons, alternating with Dodge Miradas and Chrysler Imperials. The Cordoba was no more aerodynamic than the other Mopars. The owner/driver never won a race, but was "able to collect 26 top 10s and $334,000 in career earnings."

== Collectibility ==
There are examples of Chrysler Cordobas available for collectors. However, the cars were not viewed as valuable or worth saving after the 1990s, with good examples going to the scrap yards. There is not much aftermarket support for these vehicles so collectors may encounter challenges if a complete restoration is needed.

Regarding the 300 version, Consumer Guide described in 2007 that "the '79 could become a minor collectible in the distant future, but LS prospects seem slim to non-existent at this time."
