= Chrysler 300 non-letter series =

Chrysler 300
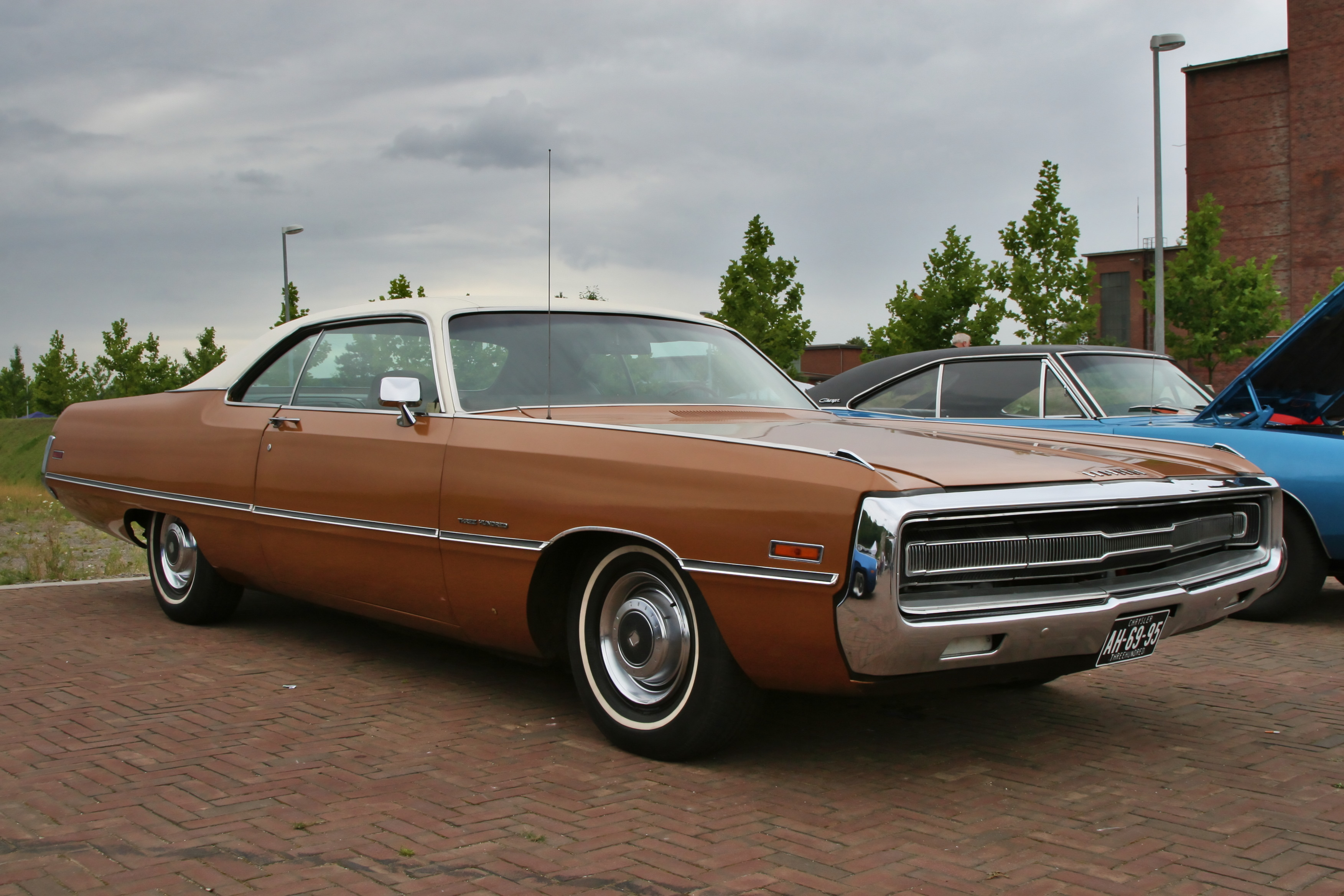
- 1971 Chrysler 300

Overview
- Manufacturer: Chrysler Corporation
- Production: 1962–1971
- Assembly: Jefferson Avenue Assembly; Detroit, Michigan, United States

Body and chassis
- Class: Fullsize car Muscle car
- Body style: 4-door hardtop 2-door hardtop 2-door convertible
- Layout: FR layout
- Related: Imperial; Chrysler New Yorker; Chrysler Newport; Chrysler Saratoga

Chronology
- Predecessor: Chrysler Saratoga
- Successor: Chrysler Cordoba

The Chrysler 300 (Chrysler 300 Sport Series) is a full-size automobile produced by Chrysler from 1962 until 1971. It was a continuation of the earlier Chrysler 300 letter series. Chrysler decided to consolidate its product line and the sedan replaced the 1961 Chrysler Windsor, which itself filled the place in Chrysler's line previously occupied by the Saratoga just the year before that (1960) and also filled in for the discontinued DeSoto product line. At the time, it was considered a luxurious "muscle car", with all the performance of the Dodge and Plymouth products of the time, but with the luxury features expected of the Chrysler name.

The 300 was positioned as a more affordable version of the exclusive 300 "letter series", and a sporty variant of a full-size automobile, adding 4-door hardtop version and running alongside that model until its discontinuation in 1966. It became the sole 300 model until 1971, when production ended. The 300 name returned to the Chrysler line in 1979 as an option package on the Cordoba coupe.

== 1962–1964 ==
Chrysler 300: 1962–1964
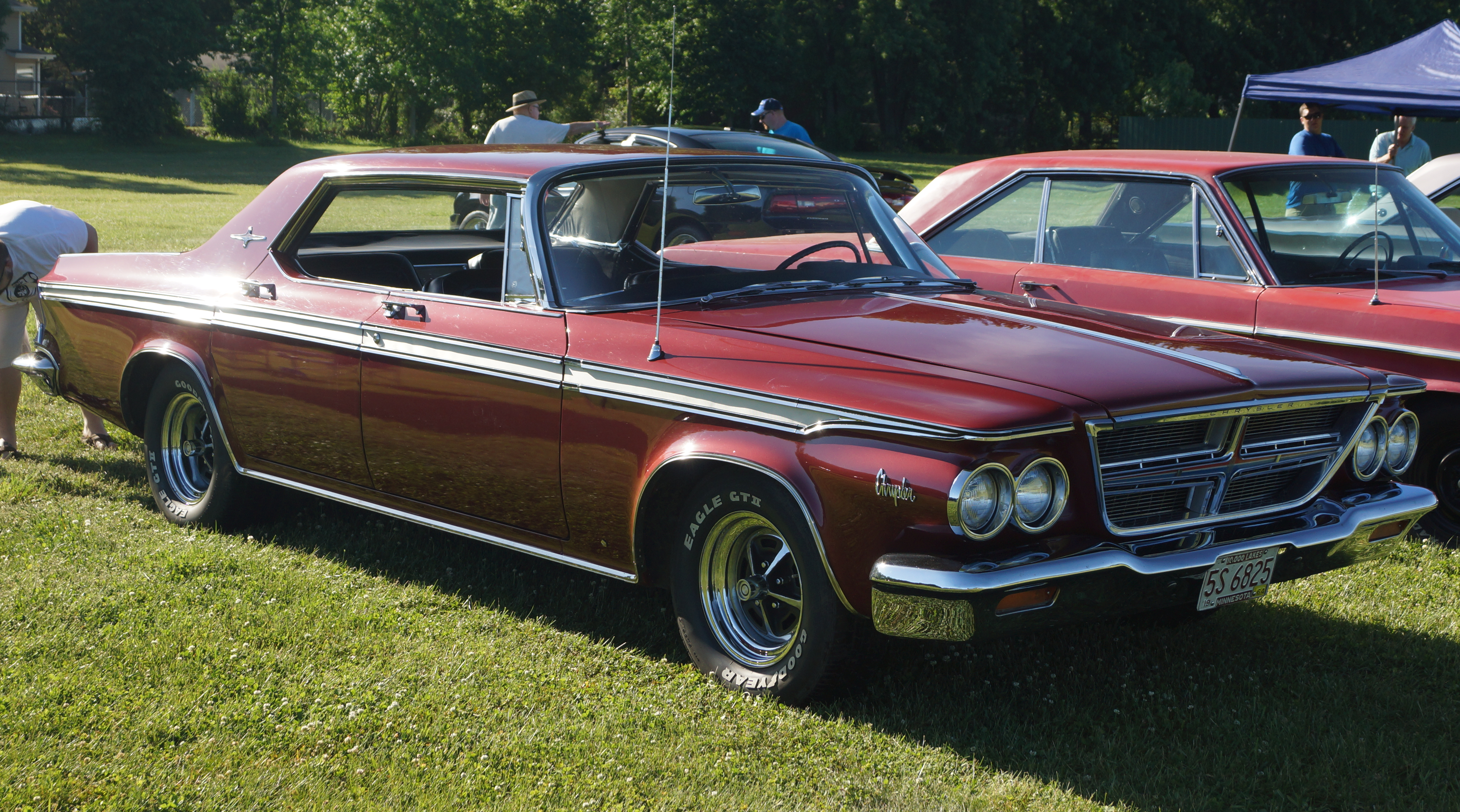
- 1964 Chrysler 300 4-door hardtop

Overview
- Production: 1962–1964
- Designer: Virgil Exner

Body and chassis
- Body style: 4-door hardtop 2-door hardtop 2-door convertible
- Platform: C-body

Powertrain
- Engine: 383 cu in (6.3 L) B V8; 413 cu in (6.8 L) RB V8
- Transmission: 3-speed automatic 3-speed manual

Dimensions
- Wheelbase: 122 in (3,099 mm)
- Length: 215.3 in (5,469 mm)
- Width: 79 in (2,007 mm)
- Height: 55 in (1,397 mm)
- Curb weight: 3,970 lb (1,801 kg) (4-door hardtop)

The Sport Series was introduced in 1962 along with the letter series 300H when DeSoto was cancelled. The Sport Series was the hardtop coupe, sedan and convertible and had only bench seats installed for all passengers, while the letter series was a coupe or convertible with only bucket seats for all passengers and a full length center console.

Chrysler expanded the 300 product line to include a 4-door hardtop, which previously appeared on the 1960 DeSoto Adventurer, adding 383 V8 as a choice (whereas letter cars had a 413 V8 standard).

For the Canadian market a similar Chrysler Saratoga was offered instead, also as a 4-door sedan; from 1964 named Chrysler Saratoga 300 and with similar trim.

1963 saw all-new sheet metal and the canted headlights were no longer offered.

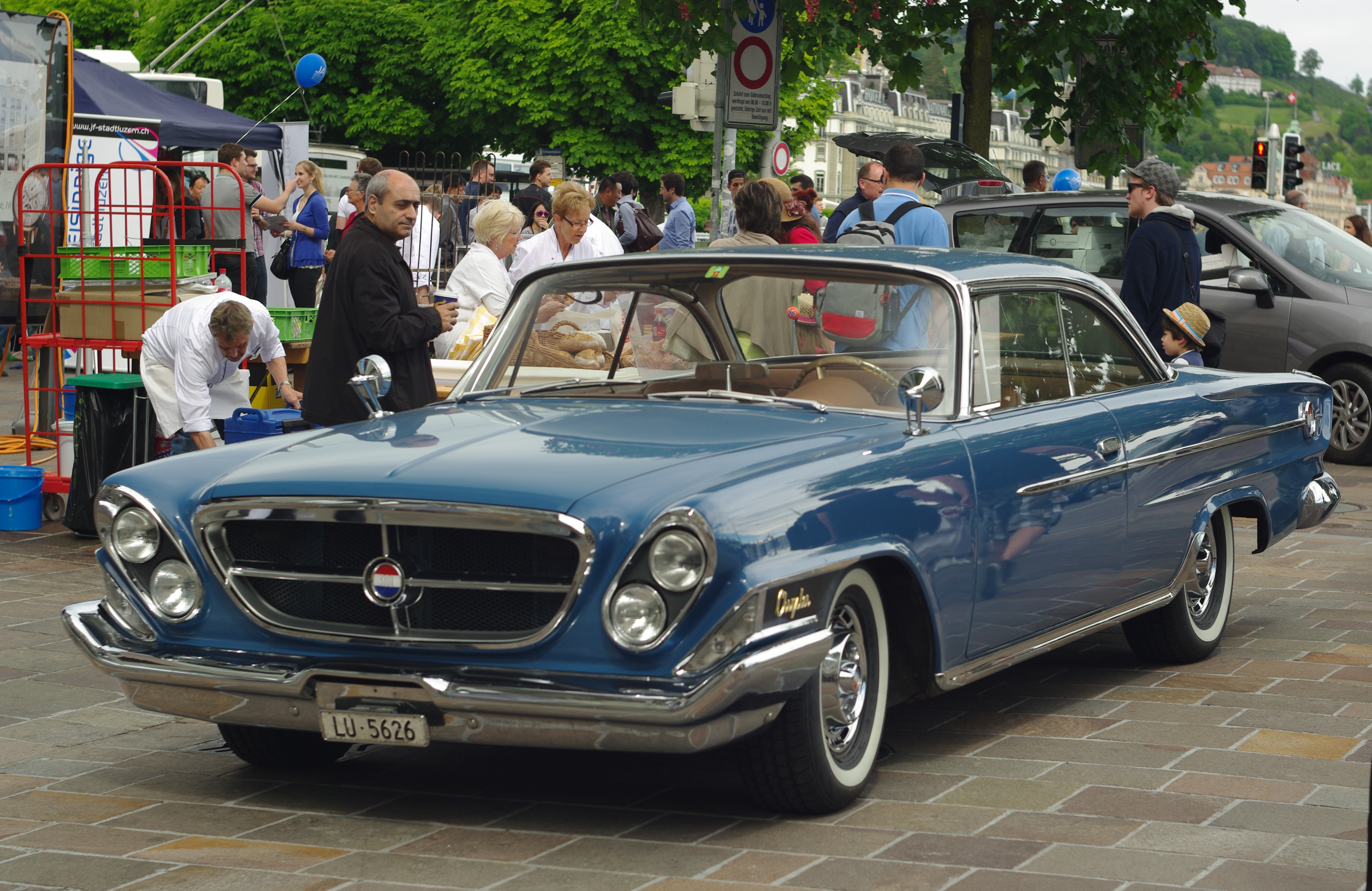
1962 Chrysler 300 Sport Series 2-door hardtop

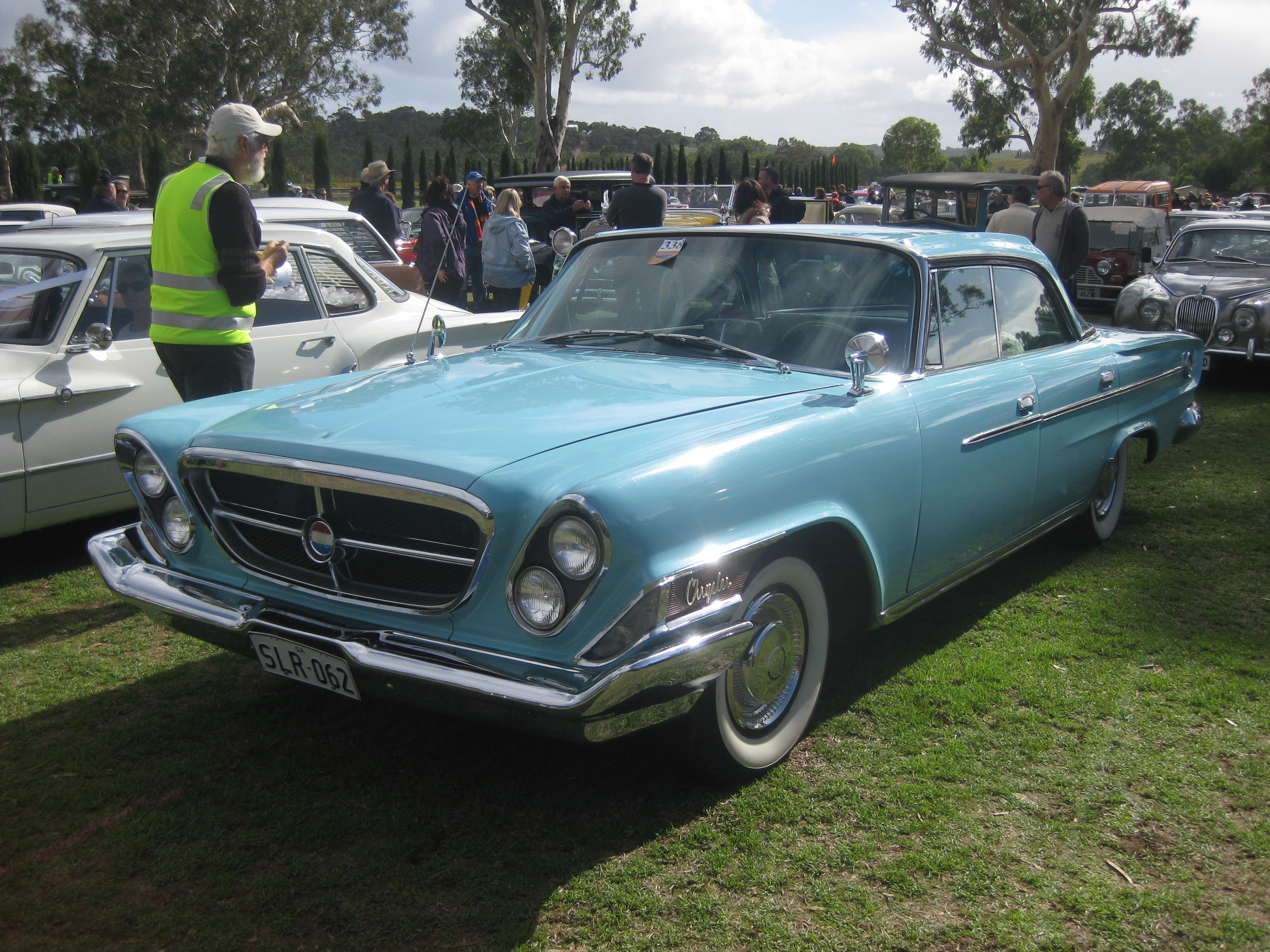
1962 Chrysler 300 Sport Series 4-door hardtop

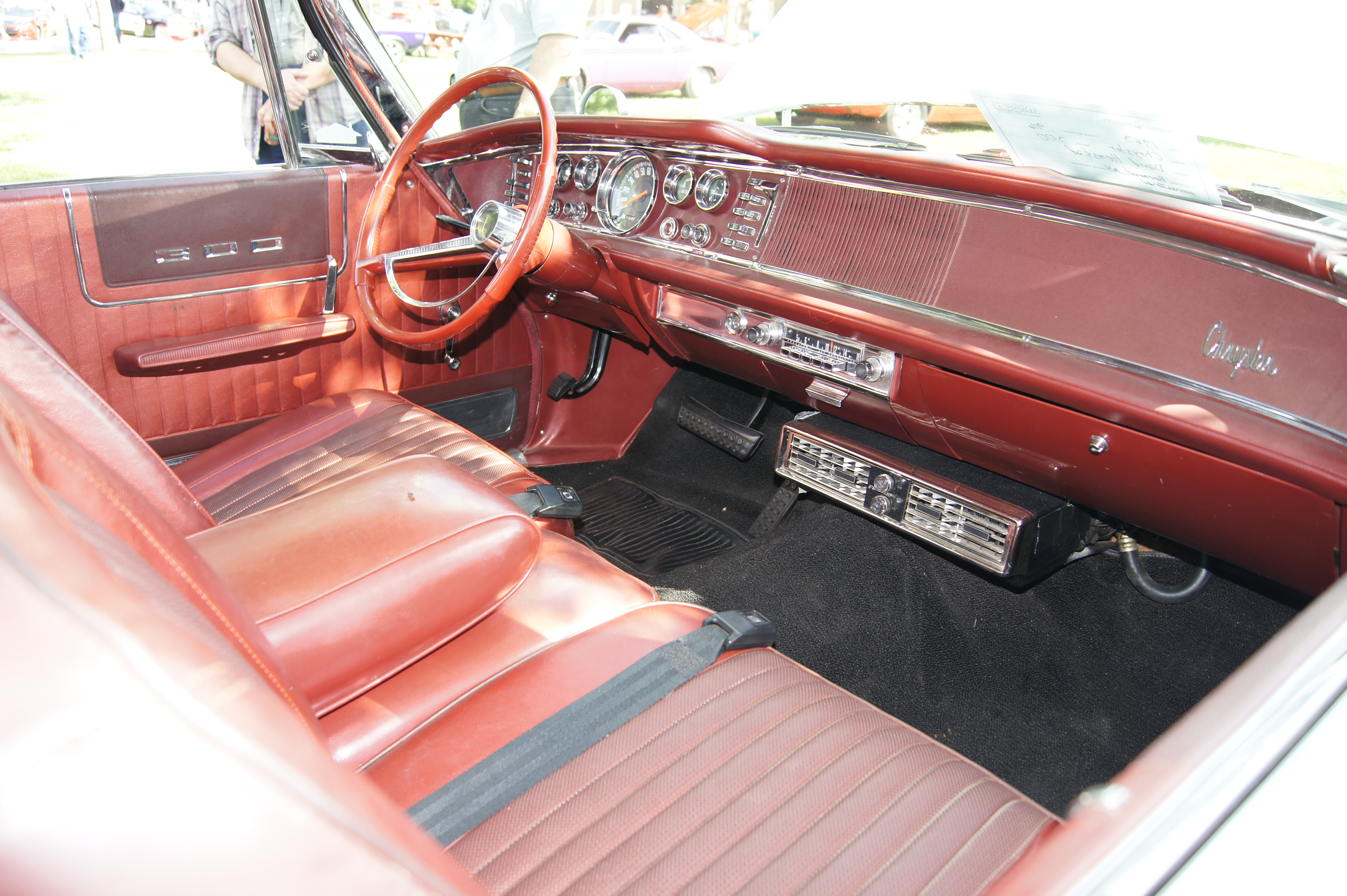
1963 Chrysler 300 interior

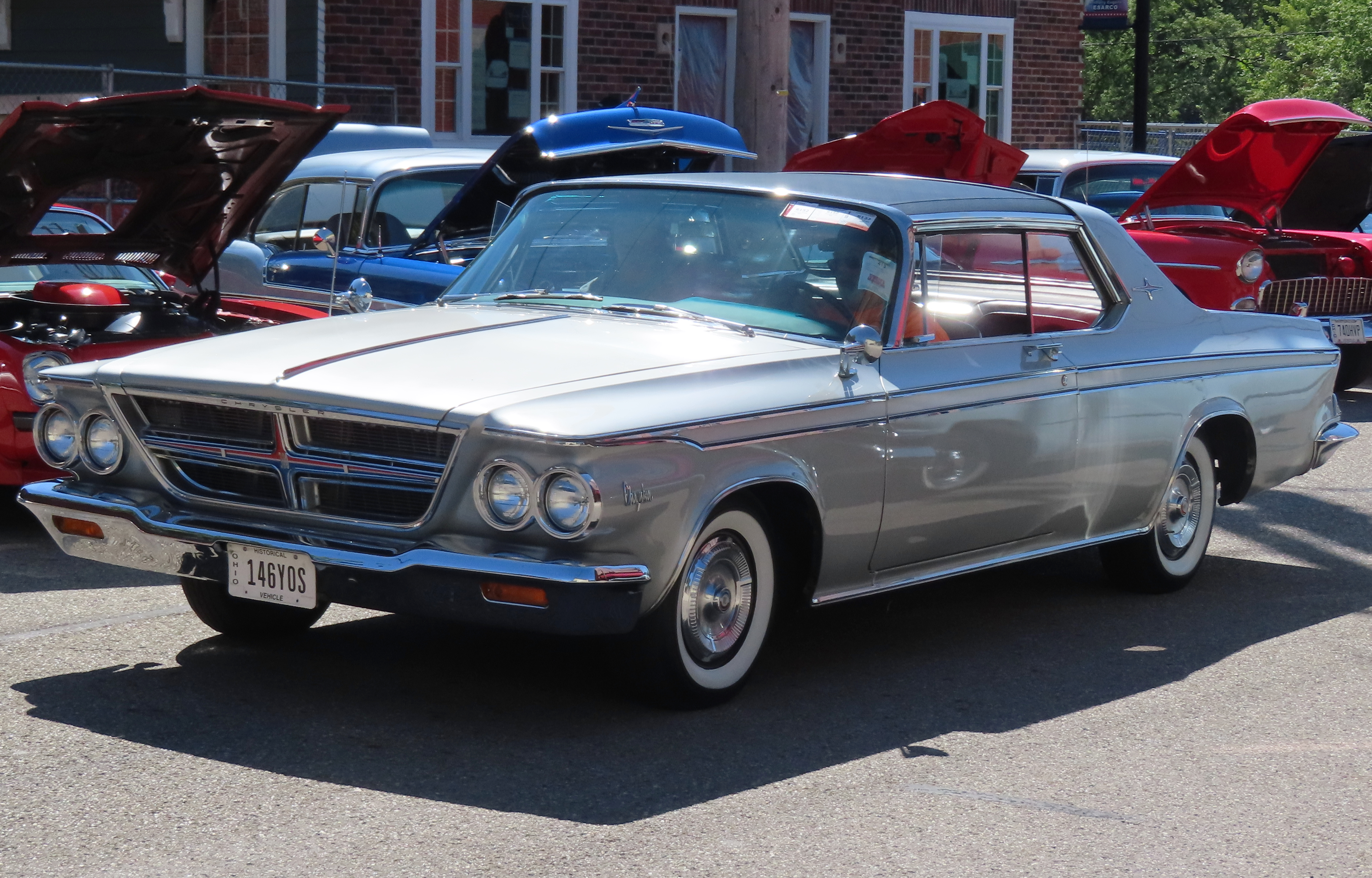
1964 Chrysler 300 2-door hardtop

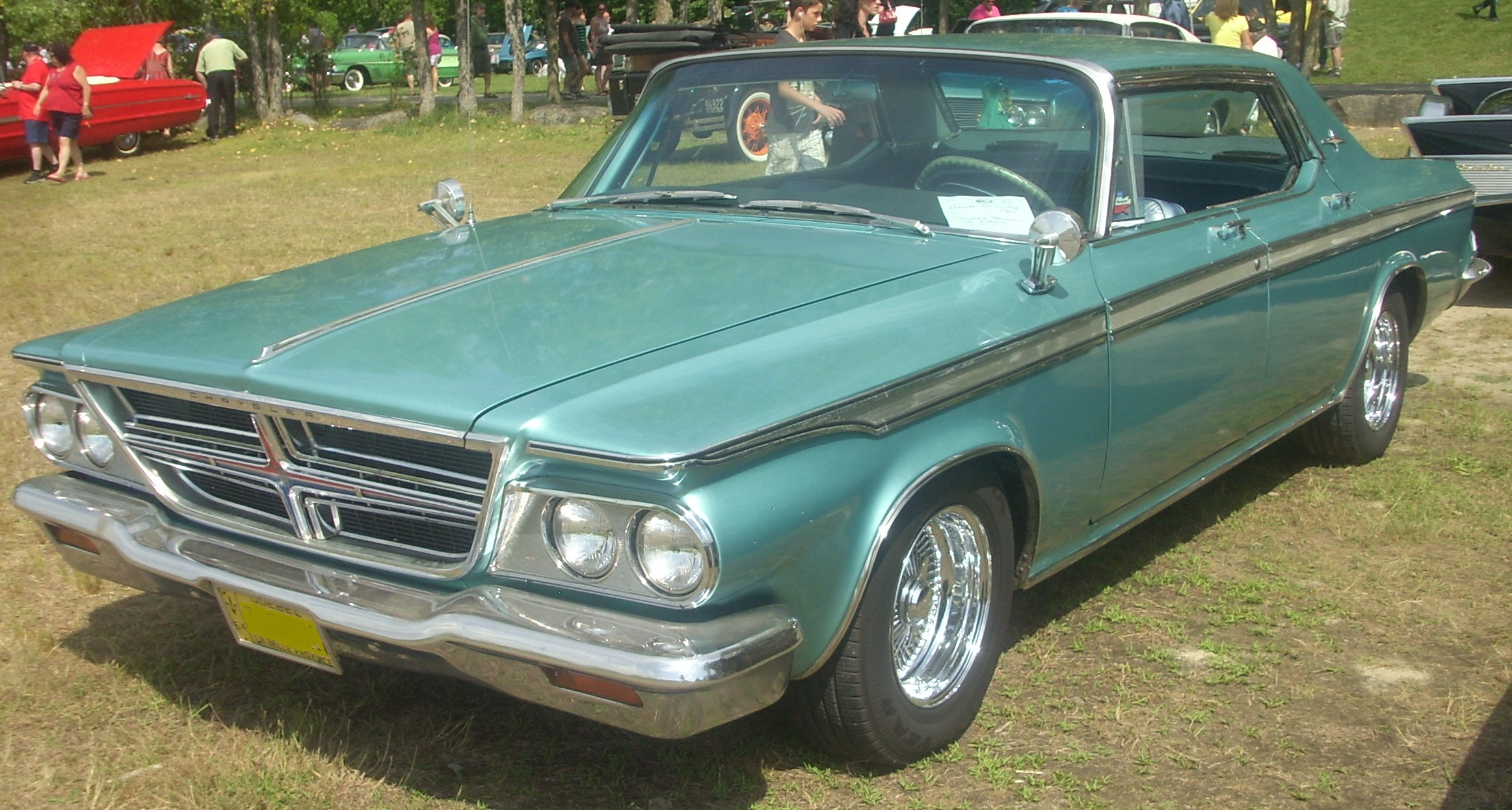
1964 Chrysler Saratoga 300 (Canadian) 4-door hardtop

== 1965–1968 ==
Chrysler 300: 1965–1968
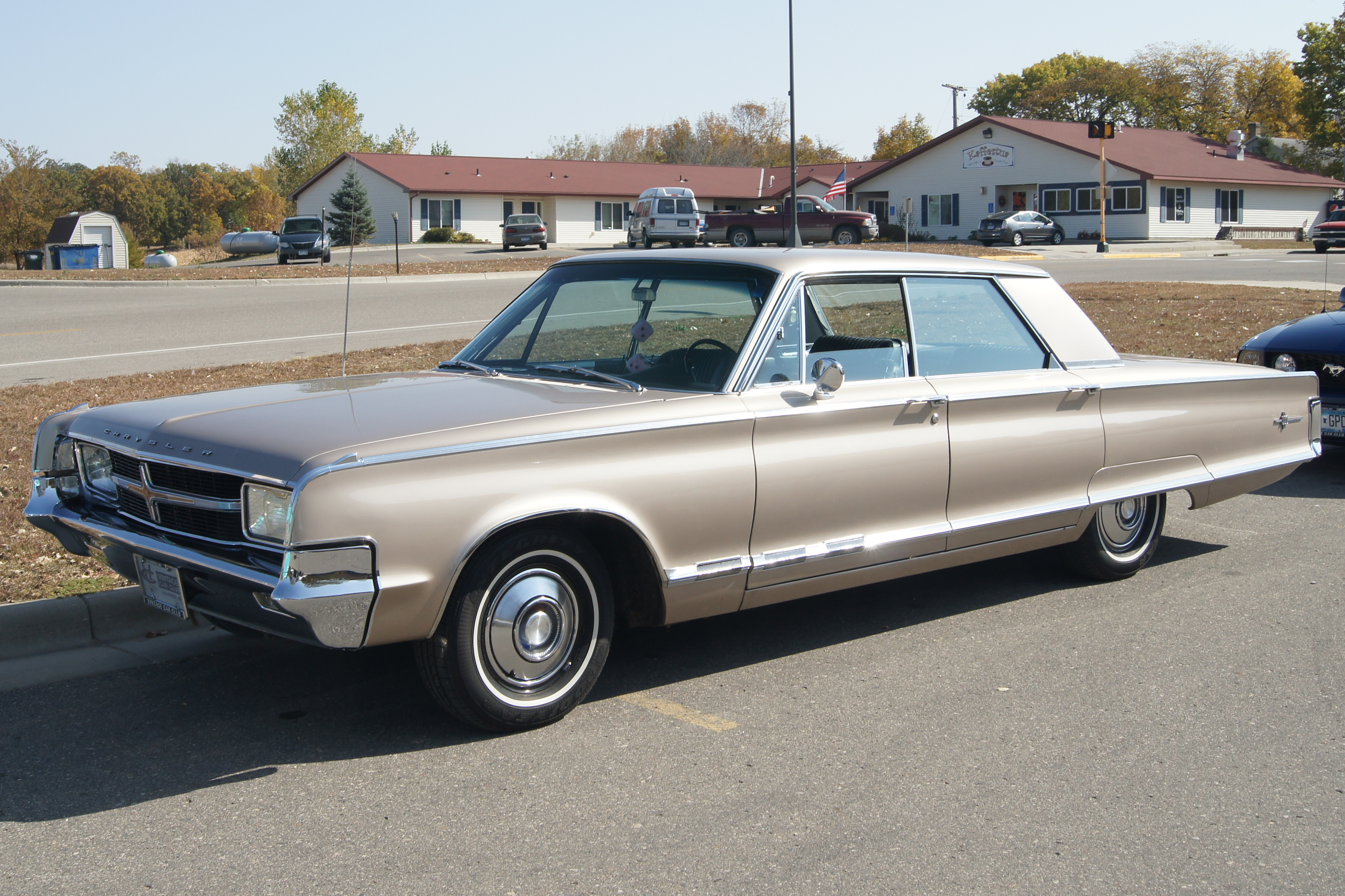
- 1965 Chrysler 300 4-door hardtop

Overview
- Production: 1965–1968
- Designer: Elwood Engel

Body and chassis
- Body style: 4-door sedan; 4-door hardtop sedan; 2-door hardtop coupe; 2-door convertible
- Platform: C-body

Powertrain
- Engine: 383 cu in (6.3 L) B V8; 413 cu in (6.8 L) RB V8; 440 cu in (7.2 L) RB V8
- Transmission: 3-speed automatic 4-speed manual

Dimensions
- Wheelbase: 124 in (3,150 mm)
- Length: 218.2 in (5,542 mm)
- Width: 79.5 in (2,019 mm)
- Height: 54.9 in (1,394 mm)
- Curb weight: 4,390 lb (1,991 kg) (4-door hardtop)

There was all-new sheetmetal in 1965. When the performance-first Chrysler 300 letter series was discontinued in 1966, the 440 V8 replaced the 413 V8 in this "non-letter" version, and there was a mild facelift.

1967 brought makeovers which changed front and rear styling extensively. The 4-door sedan was dropped from lineup (leaving the 4-door hardtop, 2-door hardtop, and 2-door convertible), the 440 V8 remained and was the only available powerplant, in two guises: base and more powerful TNT. A 1968 face-lift brought concealed headlamps which were to be 300 trademark until 1971.

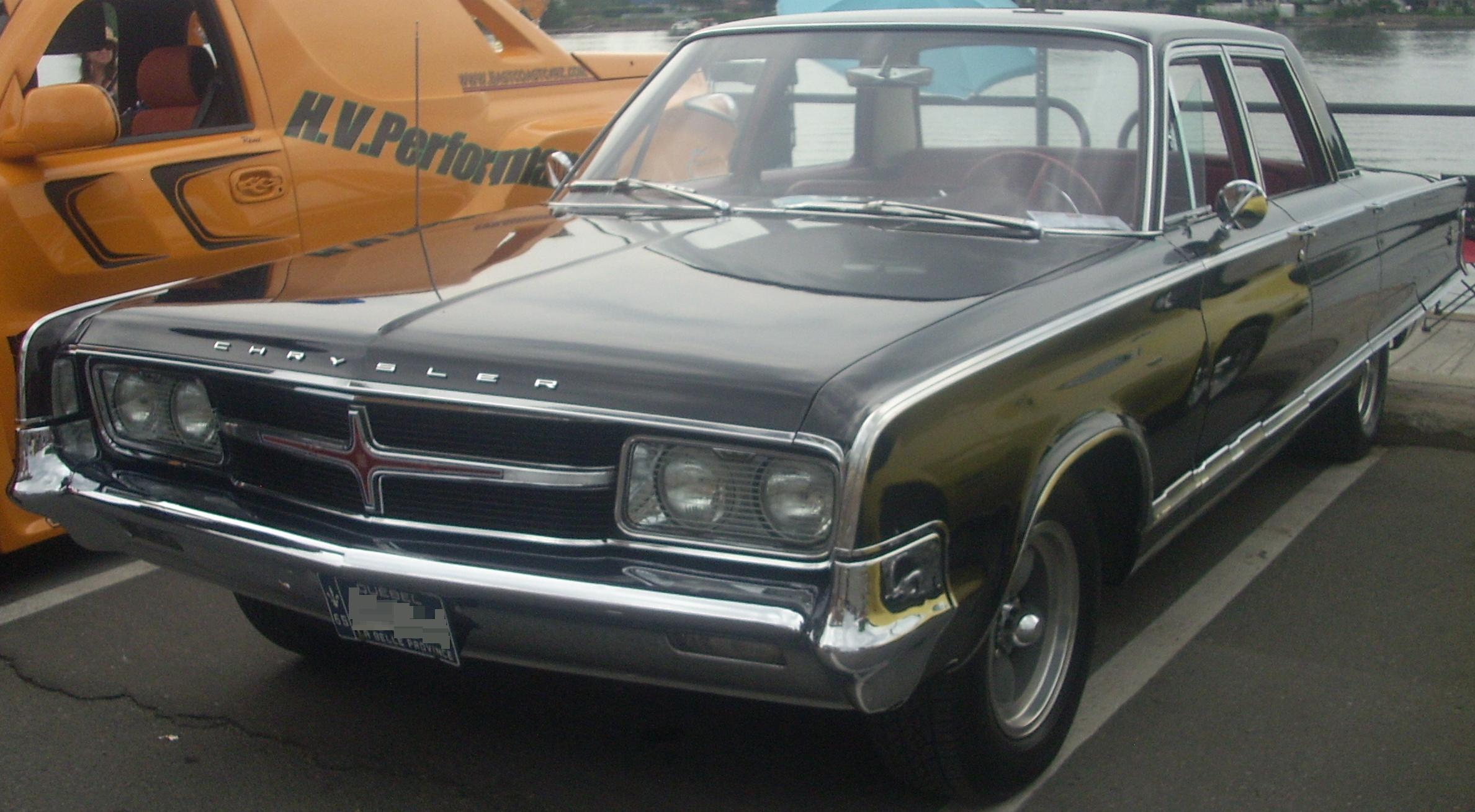
Canadian 1965 Chrysler Saratoga 300 4-door sedan

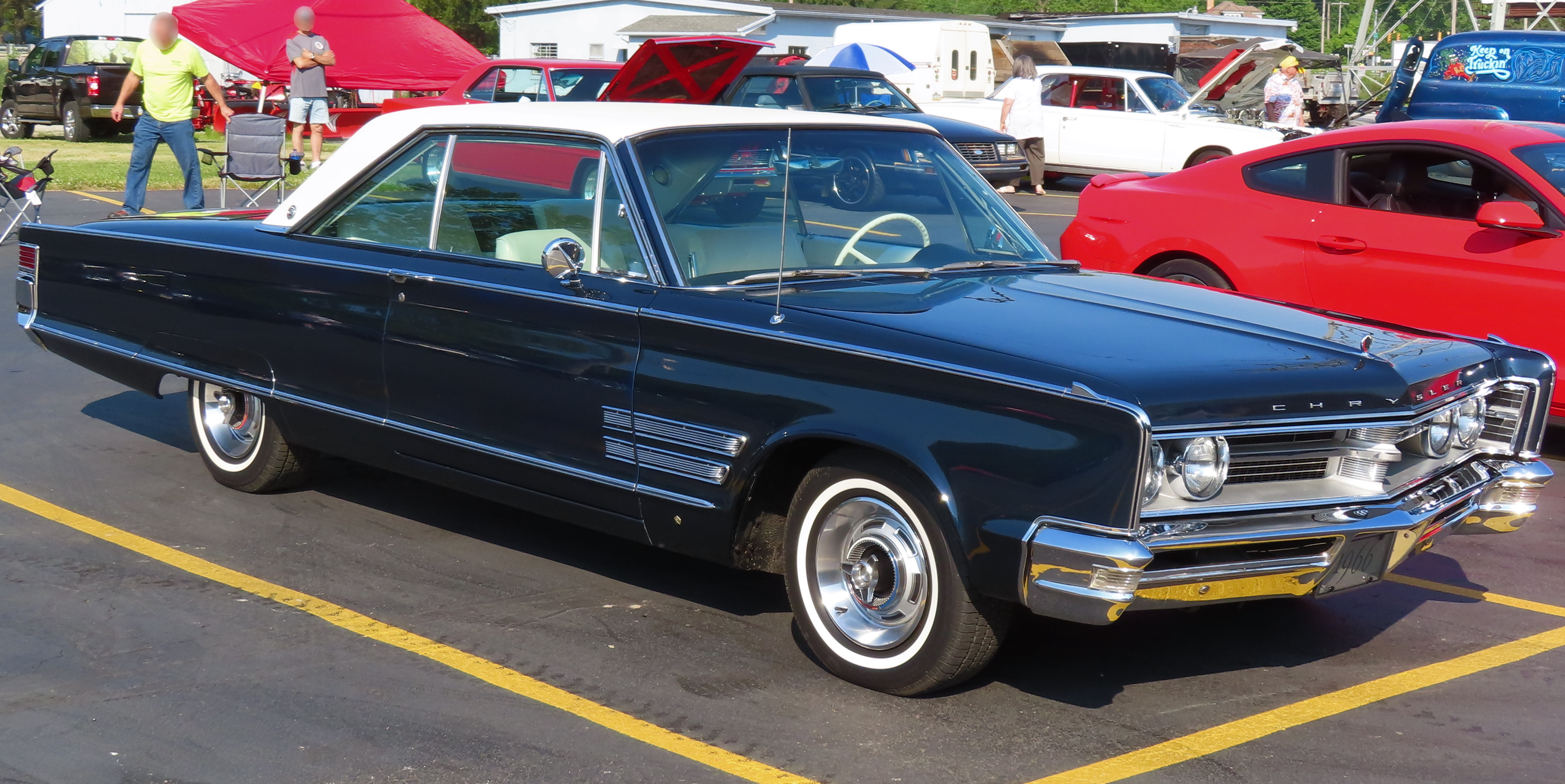
1966 Chrysler 300 2-door hardtop

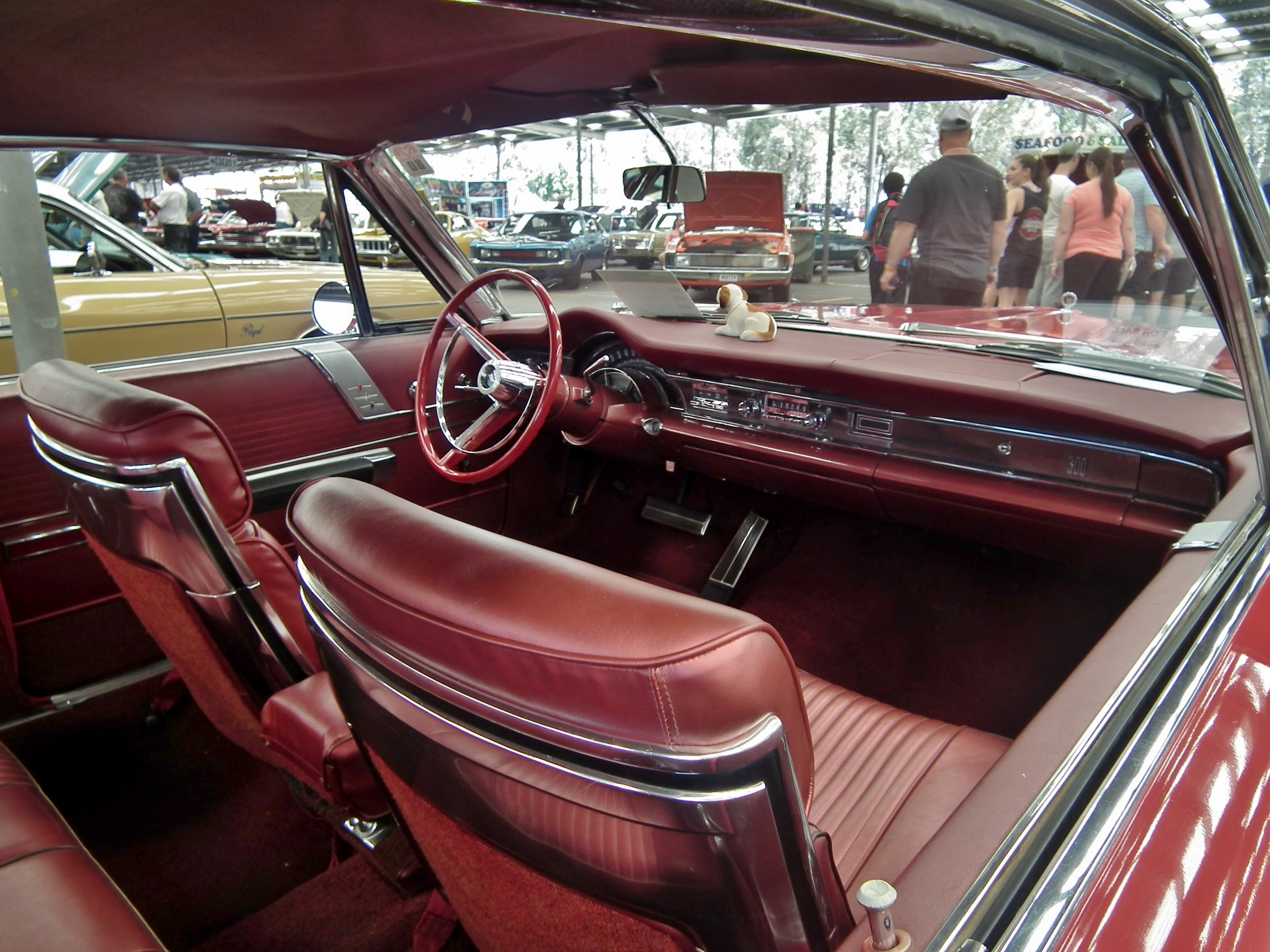
1966 Chrysler 300 2-door hardtop interior

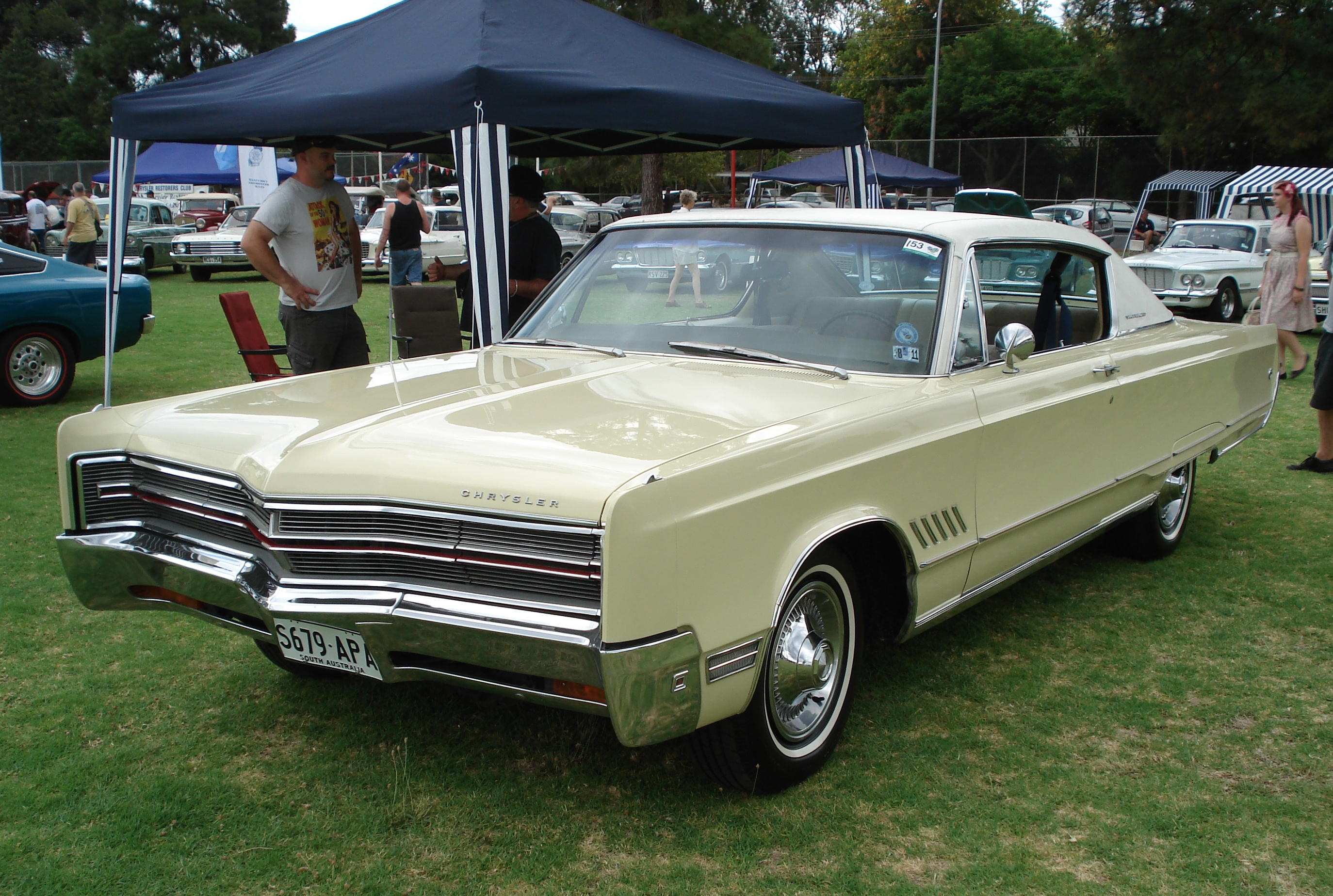
1968 Chrysler 300 2-door hardtop

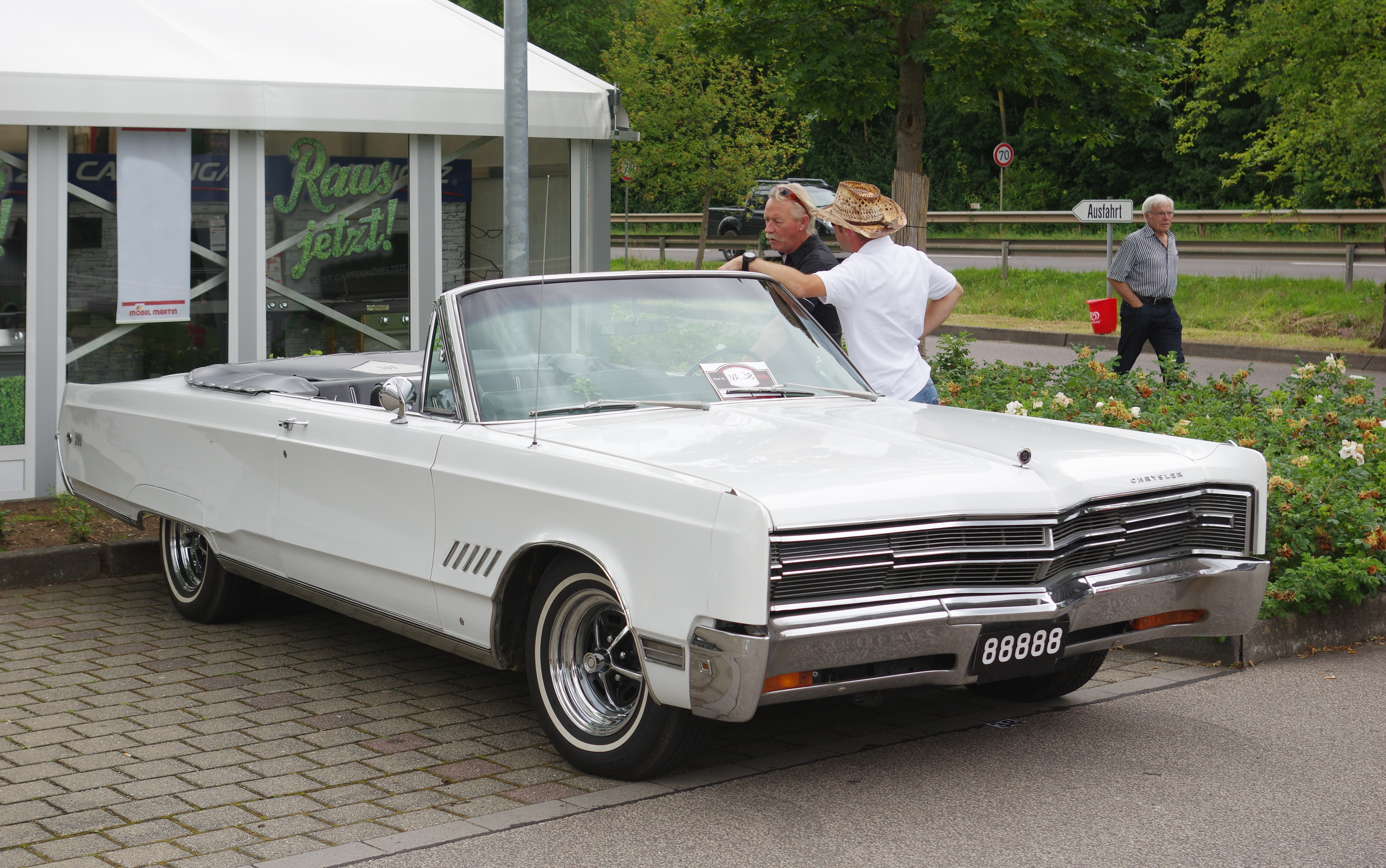
1968 Chrysler 300 convertible

== 1969–1971 ==
Chrysler 300: 1969–1971
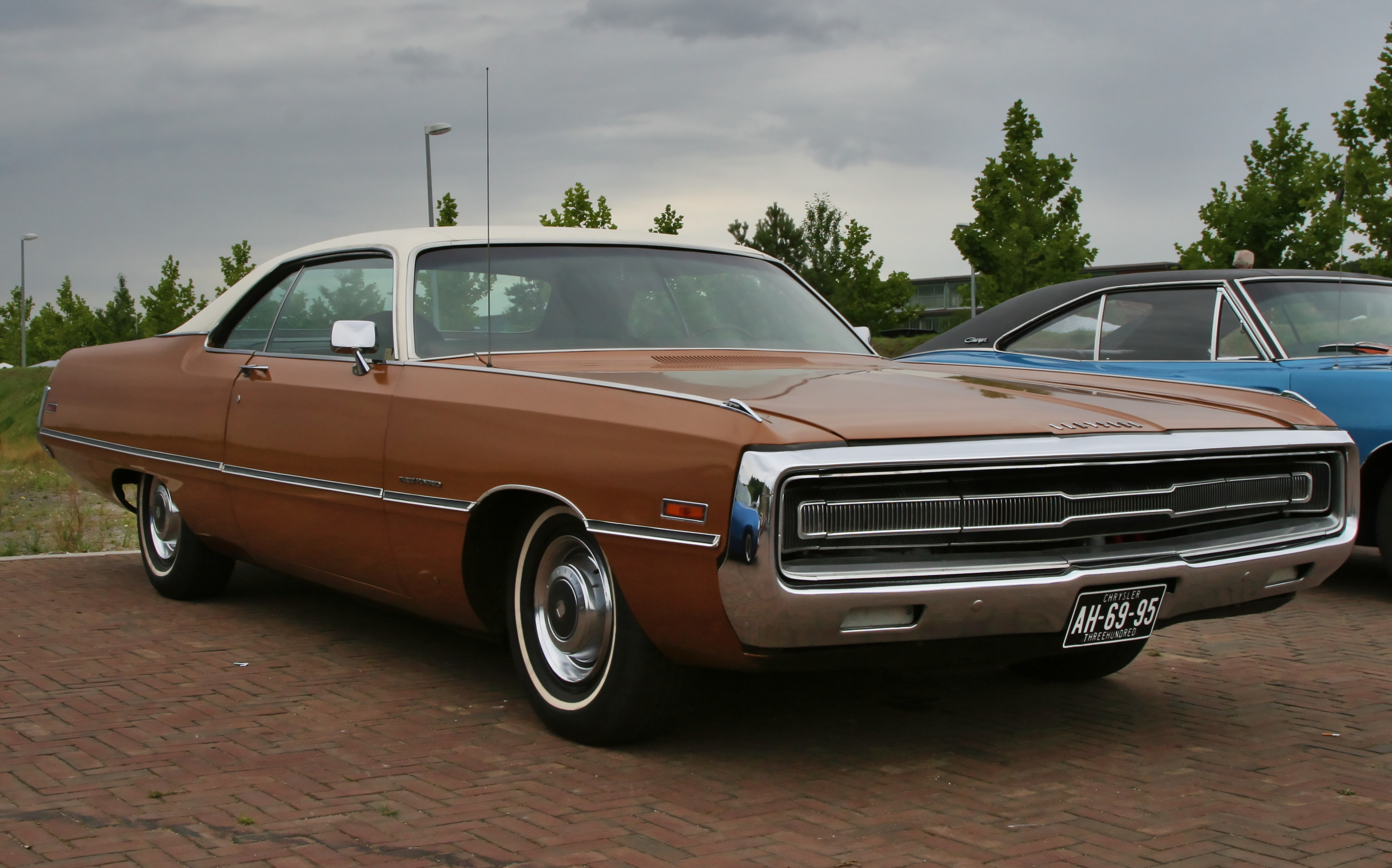
- 1971 Chrysler 300 2-door hardtop

Overview
- Production: 1969–1971

Body and chassis
- Body style: 4-door hardtop 2-door hardtop 2-door convertible
- Platform: C-body

Powertrain
- Engine: 440 cu in (7.2 L) RB V8; 440 cu in (7.2 L) TNT V8
- Transmission: 3-speed automatic

Dimensions
- Wheelbase: 124 in (3,150 mm)
- Length: 224.7 in (5,707 mm)
- Width: 79.1 in (2,009 mm)
- Height: 55.6 in (1,412 mm)
- Curb weight: 4,320 lb (1,960 kg) (4-door hardtop)

1969 was first year for "fuselage styling", there were two engine options; 440 and 440 TNT.

For 1970, taking a cue from Oldsmobile, a Hurst 300 was offered in Spinnaker White trimmed in Satin Tan with leather interior (borrowed from the Imperial), powered by a 375 hp (280 kW) 440 cu in (7.2 L) TNT V8, as a limited edition of 485. The single convertible built used a standard Chrysler 300 white interior.

In 1971, the convertible was no longer offered, as Chrysler halted production of convertibles across the entire lineup in 1971.

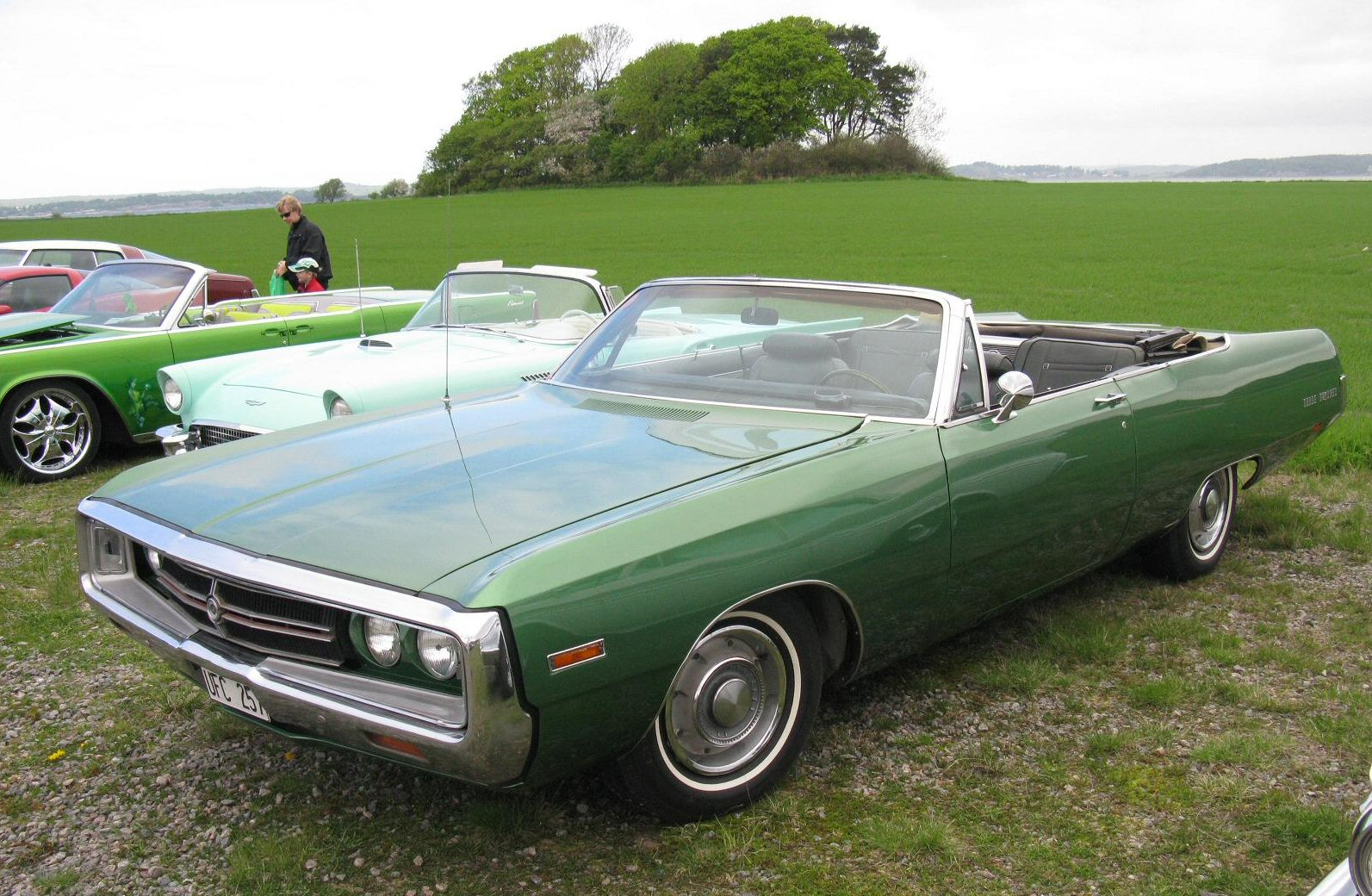
1969 Chrysler 300 Convertible

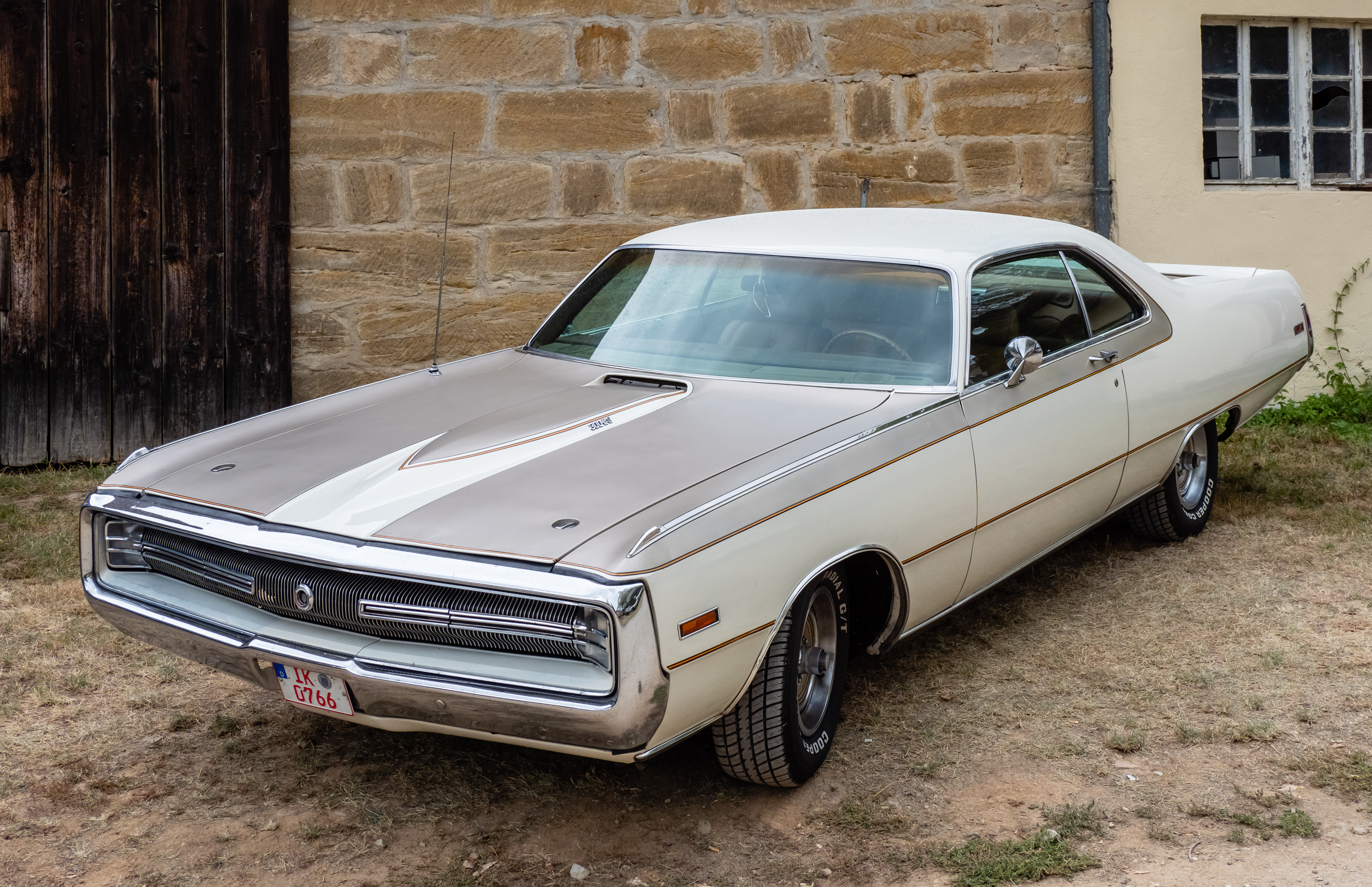
1970 Chrysler 300 Hurst 2-door hardtop

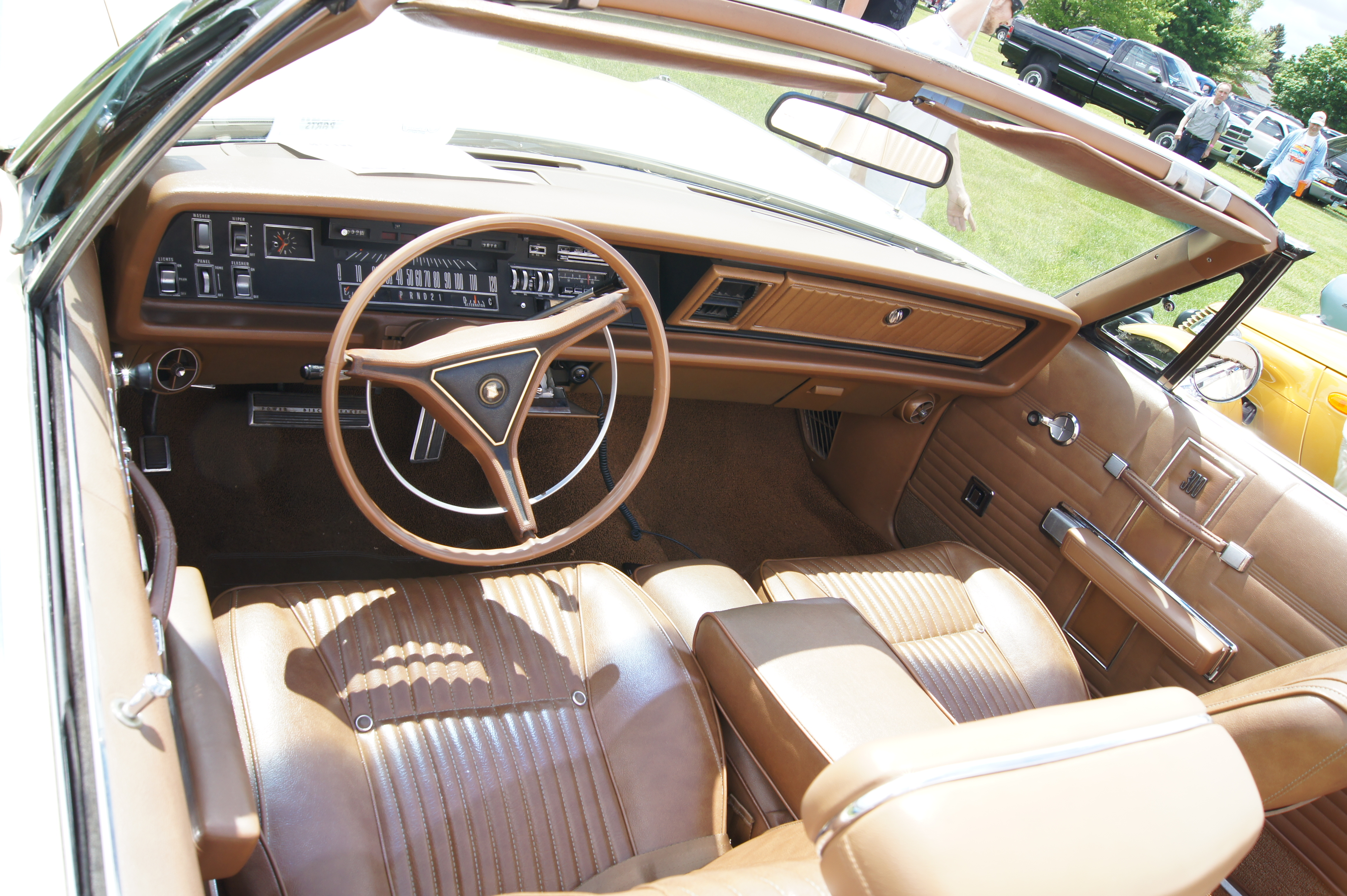
1970 Chrysler 300 interior

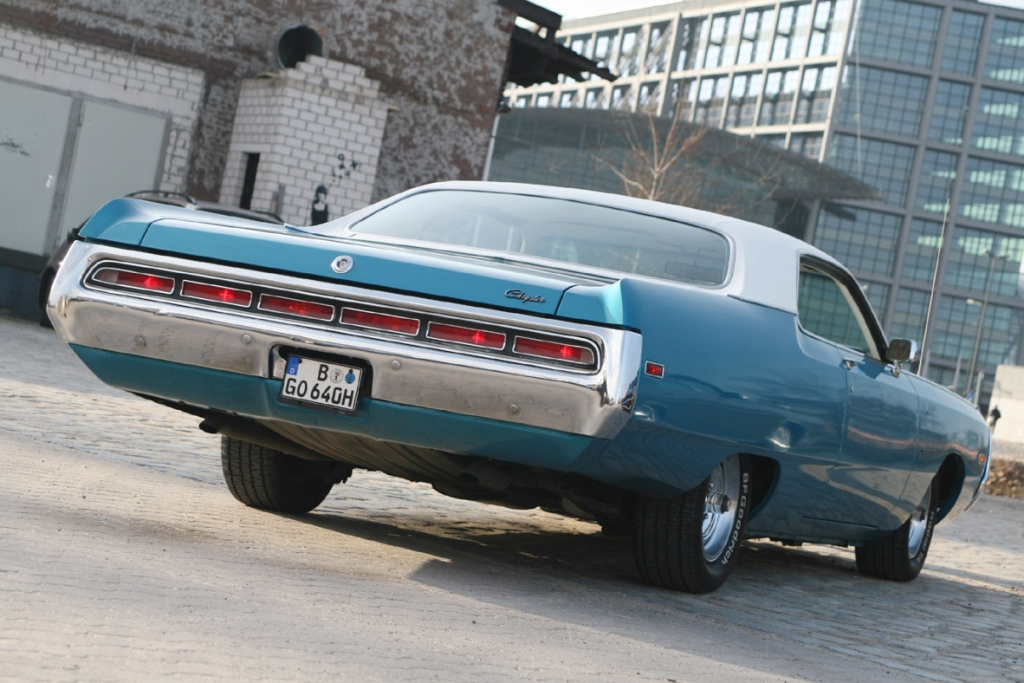
1971 Chrysler 300 2-door hardtop rear

=== Engines ===
engine displacement, type, carburetor type	max. motive power at rpm	max. torque at rpm
440 cu in (7.2 L) RB V8 (1971) 4-barrel	335 bhp (250 kW; 340 PS) [220 bhp (164 kW; 223 PS)] @ 4,400 [4,000]	460 lb⋅ft (624 N⋅m) [350 lb⋅ft (475 N⋅m)] @ 3,200
440 cu in (7.2 L) RB V8 (1969–1970) 4-barrel	350 bhp (261 kW; 355 PS) @ 4,400	480 lb⋅ft (651 N⋅m) @ 2,800
440 cu in (7.2 L) TNT V8 (1971) 4-barrel	370 bhp (276 kW; 375 PS) [305 bhp (227 kW; 309 PS)] @ 4,600	480 lb⋅ft (651 N⋅m) [400 lb⋅ft (542 N⋅m)] @ 3,200
440 cu in (7.2 L) TNT V8 (1968–1970) 4-barrel	375 bhp (280 kW; 380 PS) @ 4,600	480 lb⋅ft (651 N⋅m) @ 3,200
[ ] denoting net figures

== 1979 ==
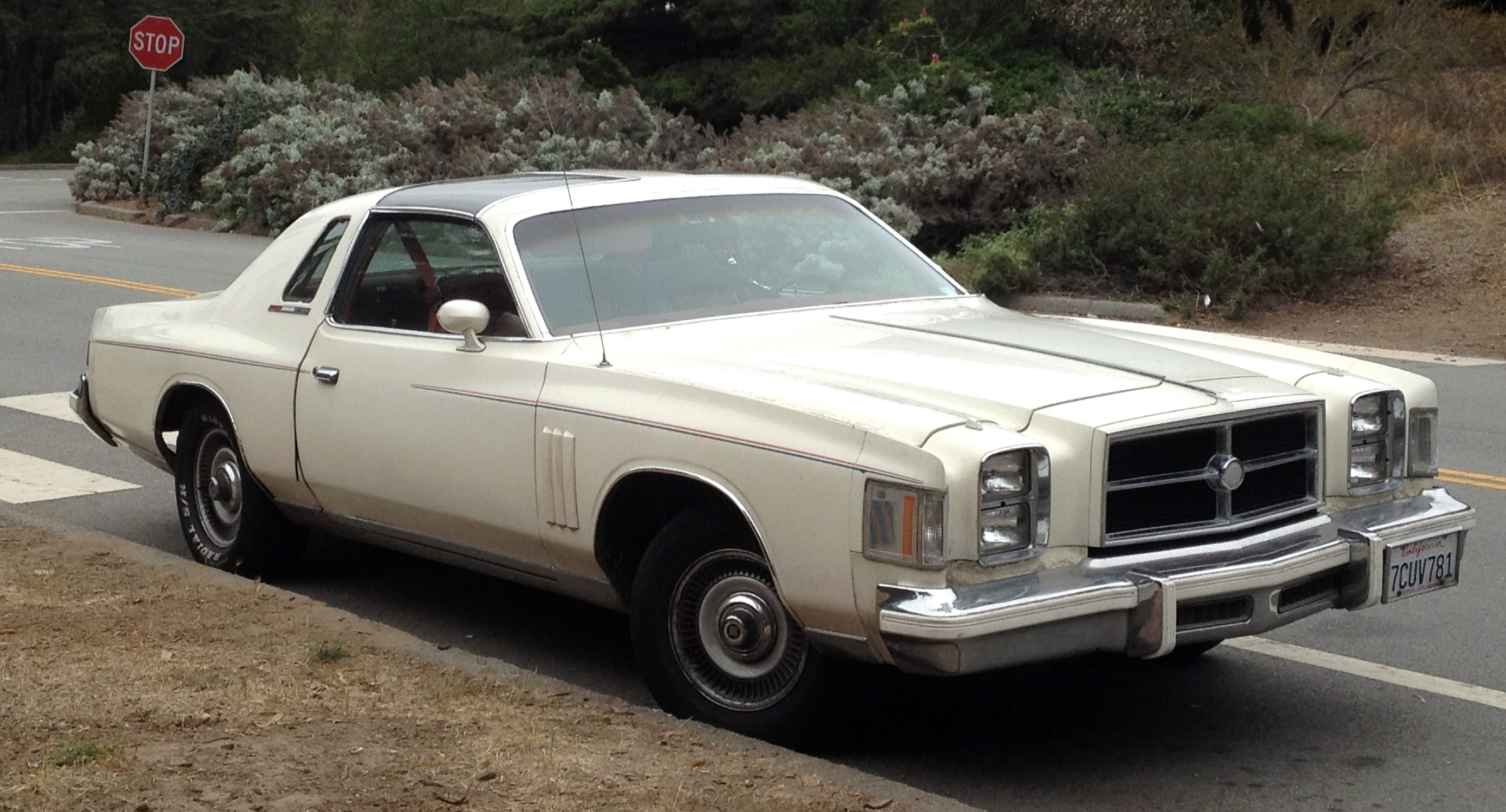
1979 Chrysler Cordoba with "300" option package

The 300 name returned to the Chrysler line in the spring of 1979; this time based on the Cordoba coupe. The 300 was a $2,040 option package featuring special emblems and traditional "cross-hair" 300-style grille. It was available in Spinnaker White (perhaps 30 were painted Rallye Red) with a red-leather interior and red pin stripes. The model came with the code E58 195 hp (145 kW; 198 PS) 360 cu in (5.9 L) V8, featuring a four-barrel carburetor, a performance camshaft, and dual exhausts.

Other features included police-spec suspension with 15"x7" wheels, heavy duty torsion bars/leaf springs/shocks, front and rear sway bars, and a 3.23 rear gear ratio. The deteriorating U.S. domestic economic conditions that led to the early 1980s recession reflected in low demand and less than 2,900 were built. The 300 model was planned for the 1980 model year using the new 2nd-generation Cordoba (based on the downsized Chrysler J platform), but was instead called the "LS".
