= Corinthian leather =

Marketing term used by Chrysler

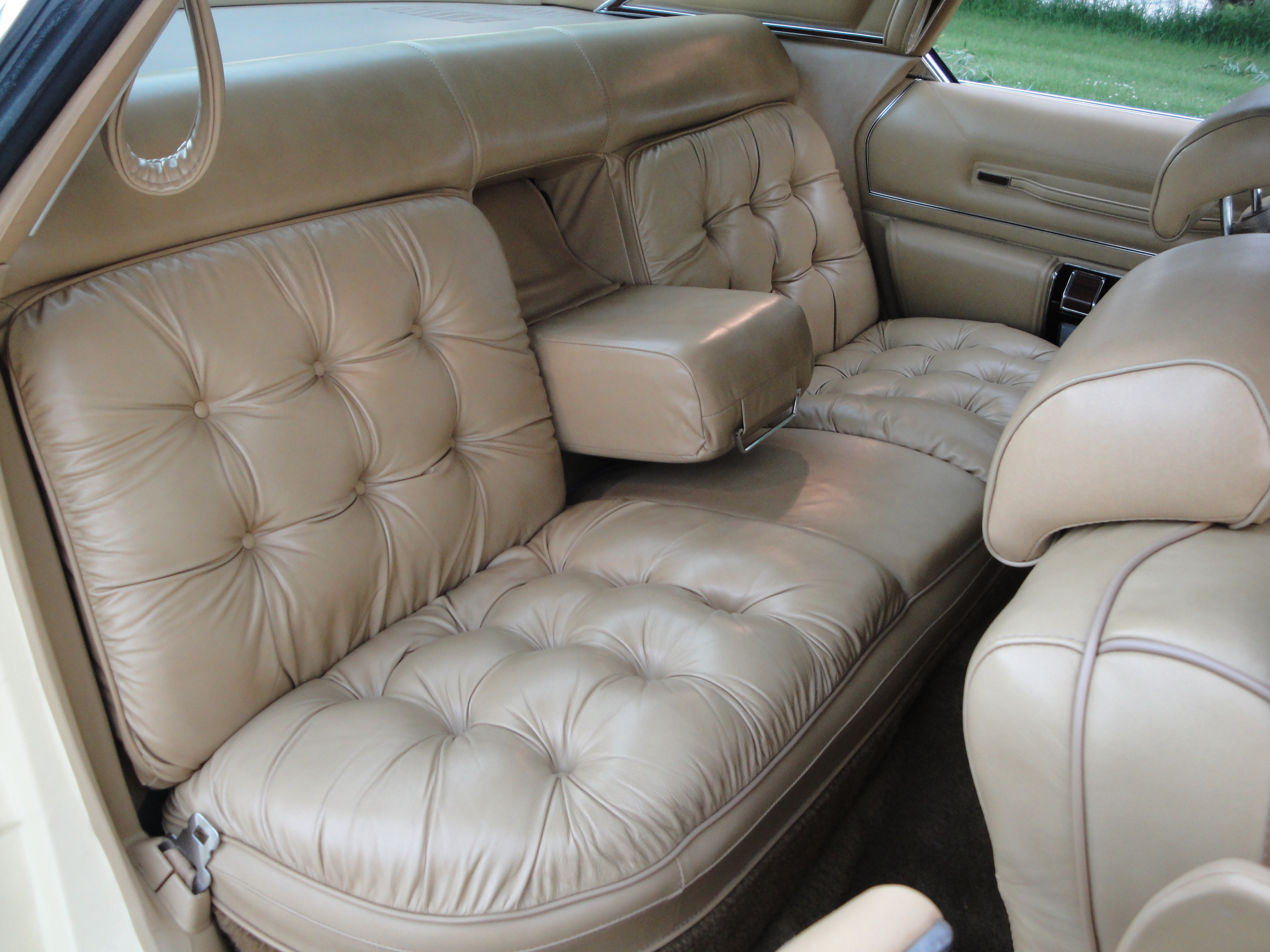
The Corinthian leather upholstery of a 1978 Chrysler New Yorker automobile.

Corinthian leather is a marketing term coined by copywriter Jim Nichols with the Omaha-based Bozell advertising agency in 1974 to describe a leather upholstery used in certain luxury vehicles of the Chrysler automobile company.

The advertisements developed the term Corinthian leather to imply a premium product of foreign origin denoting something rich, rare, and luxurious, though the product was in fact made by the Radel Leather Manufacturing Company in Newark, New Jersey.

Though Chrysler first used the term Corinthian leather in advertisements for the 1974 Imperial LeBaron, the term itself would ultimately become heavily associated with the 1975 Cordoba, an intermediate personal luxury car. The success of the advertising campaign closely associated actor Ricardo Montalbán, the spokesman, with the Cordoba's so-called Corinthian leather. In promoting the Cordoba model, Montalbán described a car interior with thickly-cushioned, luxury seats upholstered in what were variously described as either fine, soft, or rich Corinthian leather.

When asked on Late Night with David Letterman what the term denoted, Montalbán said that Corinthian leather was a marketing term. Montalbán credited commercial writer Jim Nichols for the term. In promoting the Chrysler New Yorker in 1988, Montalbán described the Corinthian leather as a "rich" leather. The term came to include the vinyl upholstering for interior surfaces, such as the backs of the front seats and the head rests, and the lower parts of door facings.

In the book BAD — Or, The Dumbing of America (1991), Paul Fussell wrote that the term Corinthian leather was chosen "because a reference book suggested that Corinthian connotes rich desirability" and so appeal to modern people who love luxury, as much as did the people of Ancient Corinth. That love of luxury of the Corinthians, Fussell noted, was “why Saint Paul selected them to receive one of his loudest moral blasts. He told them, ‘It is reported that there is fornication among you. . .’. ” Fussell concluded that whoever coined the term Corinthian leather would have to admit that the term itself "is just words" and that the leather in question "never saw Corinth at all."

Apart from describing actual leather, Ford also used the descriptive Corinthian to market an optional vinyl seating material for its 1977 Maverick.
