= C200 =

C200 may refer to:

== Vehicles ==
- Chrysler C-200, a 1952 concept car created by Chrysler
- Honda Super Cub C200
- Macchi C.200, a World War II fighter plane manufactured in Italy
- Mercedes C200, is a model of compact executive car produced by the Mercedes-Benz division of Daimler AG
- SsangYong C200, a future automobile planned for production in late 2009 by Korean automaker SsangYong Motor Company
- SpaceX Dragon 2 space capsule, the C200-series Dragon capsules

== Other uses ==
- Arachidic acid (code C20:0)
- Sansa c200, is a model of flash memory-based digital audio players and portable media players produced by SanDisk

== See also ==
- Chrysler 200C EV, a plug-in hybrid electric concept car created by Chrysler
- C2000
- 200
- C20 (disambiguation)
- C2 (disambiguation)
- C (disambiguation)
