= Stutz Bearcat =

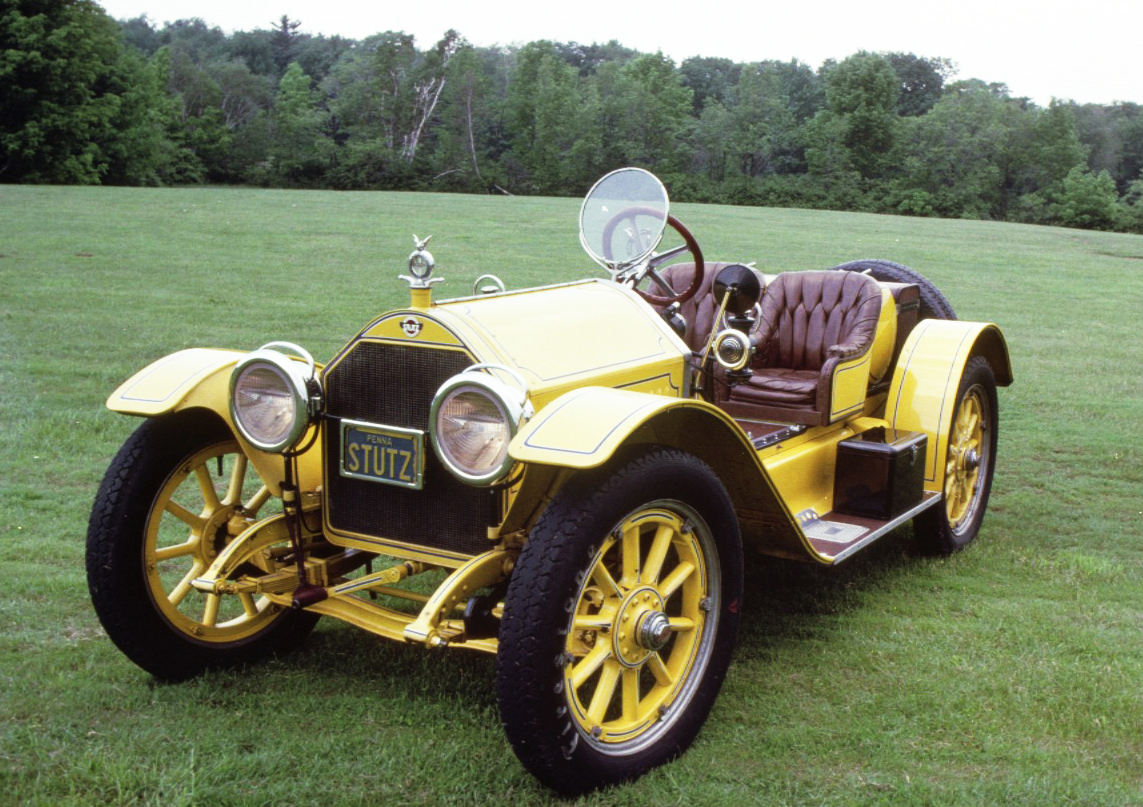
1914 Stutz Bearcat

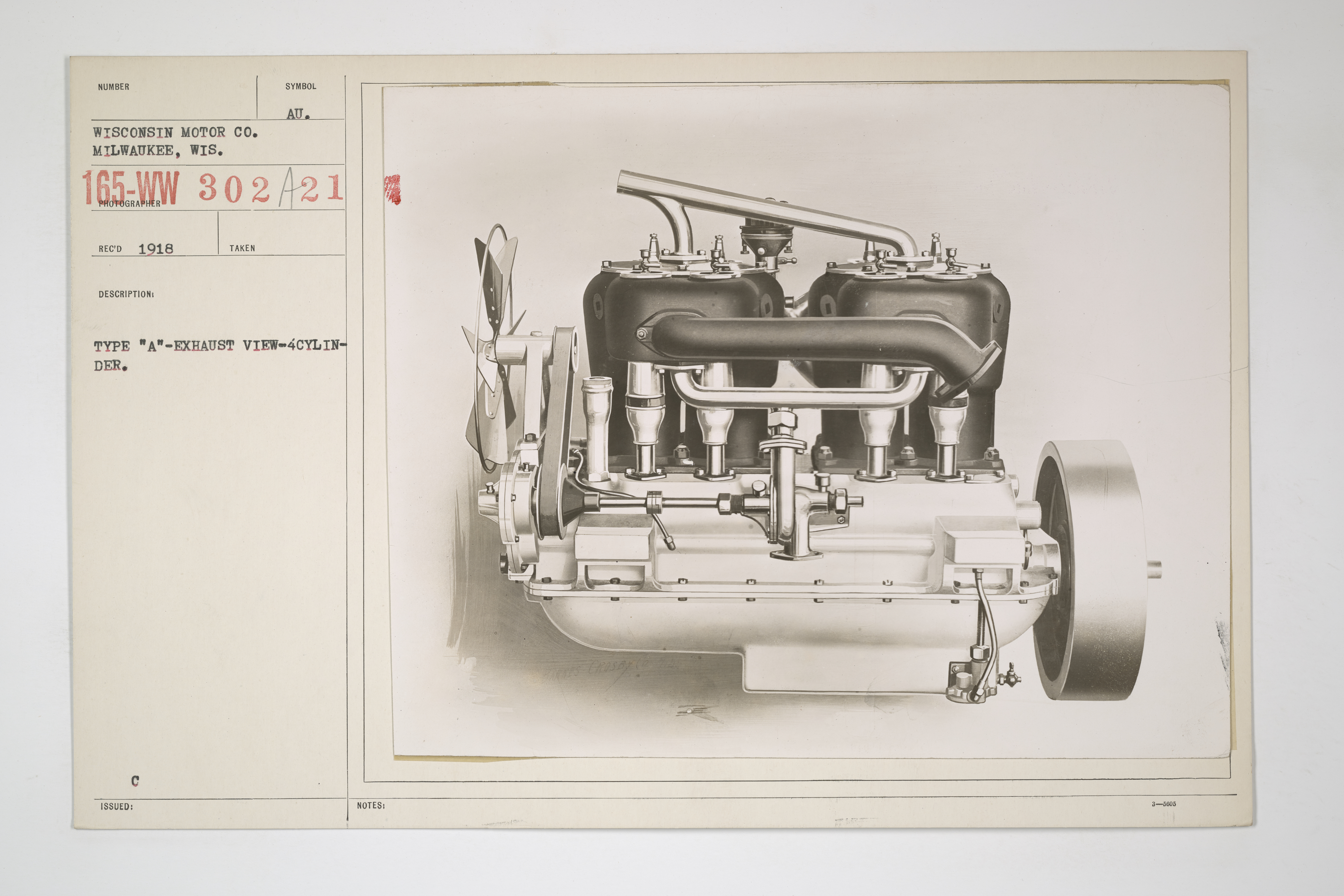
Wisconsin Type A

The Stutz Bearcat was an American sports car of the pre– and post–World War I period.

Essentially, the Bearcat was a shorter (120-inch [3,048 mm] wheelbase vs 130-inch [3,302 mm]), lighter version of the standard Stutz passenger car's chassis. It was originally powered by a 390-cubic-inch (6.39 L), 60-horsepower straight-four engine produced by the Wisconsin Motor Manufacturing Company. Common with racing and sports cars of the period, it featured minimal bodywork consisting of a "dog house" hood, open bucket seats, a tiny "monocle" windscreen in front of the driver, and a cylindrical fuel tank on a short rear deck. Production Bearcats differed from the factory "White Squadron" racers by having fenders, lights and a trunk. According to factory literature from 1913 the Bearcat "was designed to meet the needs of the customer desiring a car built along the lines of a racing car with a slightly higher gear ratio than our normal torpedo roadster, has met with great favor with motor car owners and meets the demand for a car of this class."

== Model history ==
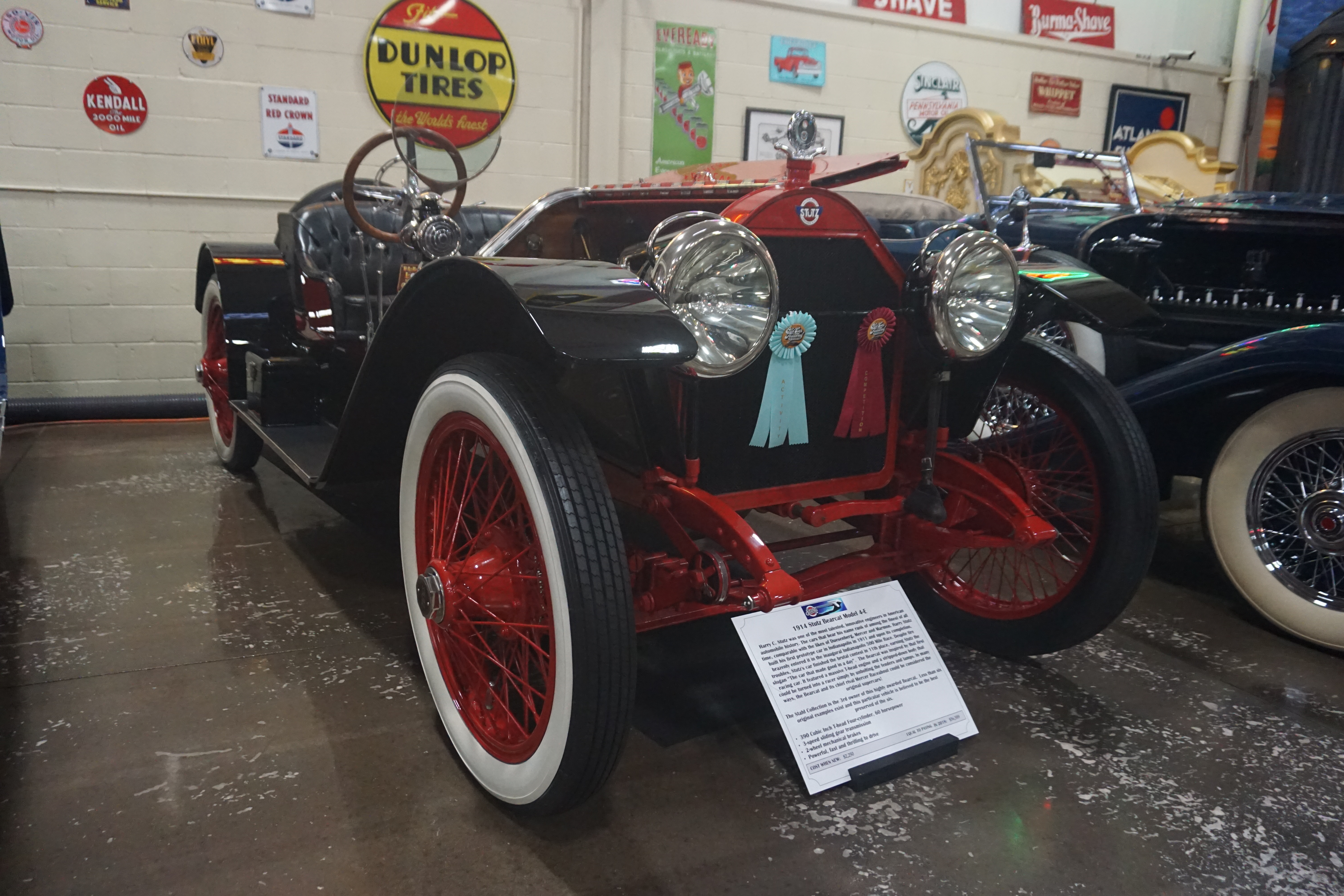
1914 Stutz Bearcat Model 4-E at Stahls Automotive Collection

The original production Bearcat was introduced in the Series A of 1912. The first public mention of the car (then spelled "Bear Cat" ) is in an advertisement in the 1912 program for the Indianapolis 500 mile race. This ad also was the first to use the soon to be famous Stutz slogan "The Car that made good in a day" referring to the Stutz racer's 11th-place finish in the 1911 Indianapolis 500. The Series E of 1913 brought electric lights and starter. A six-cylinder option was available for an extra $250.00 (equivalent to $8,144 in 2025). The doorless body style lasted through 1916. A sales catalog lists the available colors for the Series E as vermillion, monitor gray, and Mercedes red. Wire wheels were listed as a $125 option (equivalent to $3,698 in 2025).

The Series S Bearcat of 1917 brought the first large change to the model. While it retained the 120-inch (300 cm) wheelbase, its body now featured an enclosed cockpit with step-over sides. It continued to be right-hand drive with external gearshift and brake levers. The main change was a new Stutz-designed 390-cubic-inch (6.39 L) 16-valve four-cylinder engine. It was cast in a single block had a heat-treated nickel crank and camshafts. For 1919, the Series G was similar, but the mid-1919 Series H bodies featured cut-down sides to make cockpit entrance easier. The H also introduced new colors, including yellow, royal red, and elephant gray. By the end of 1919, price for a Bearcat had risen to $3,250 (equivalent to $60,353 in 2025, the same as the roadster and slightly less than the touring coupe). The 1920 Series K was again similar, but prices rose to $3,900 (equivalent to $62,679 in 2025) in the wake of a postwar auto sales boom. The 1921 series K featuring a new "DH" engine with a detachable head was introduced, but a switch to left-hand drive in the following KLDH (L for left) meant the end of the Bearcat, since its narrow front seat and cockpit did not leave room for centrally located gear and brake levers. By 1922, the famed Bearcat name was missing from model lists and sales literature. For 1923, the roadster was renamed the Bearcat, but the name would again disappear in 1924.

The Bearcat name was reintroduced in 1931. The depression had not been kind to Stutz, so the name was used as a way to boost sales. The new Bearcat had the DV-32 (32 valve) eight-cylinder engine and each car came with an affidavit saying the car had been tested at 100 mph (160 km/h). It was a small coupe featuring dual side-mount spare tires and a rakish dip in the doors, similar to contemporary (and future) sports cars. The car lasted through 1933. The same year, the model range was enhanced by the DV-32 powered "Super Bearcat", which offered full weather protection and higher performance. Sitting on a 116-inch (2,900 mm) wheelbase, it featured a lightweight fabric body built by Weymann. Stutz production ended in 1934.

== Racing history ==
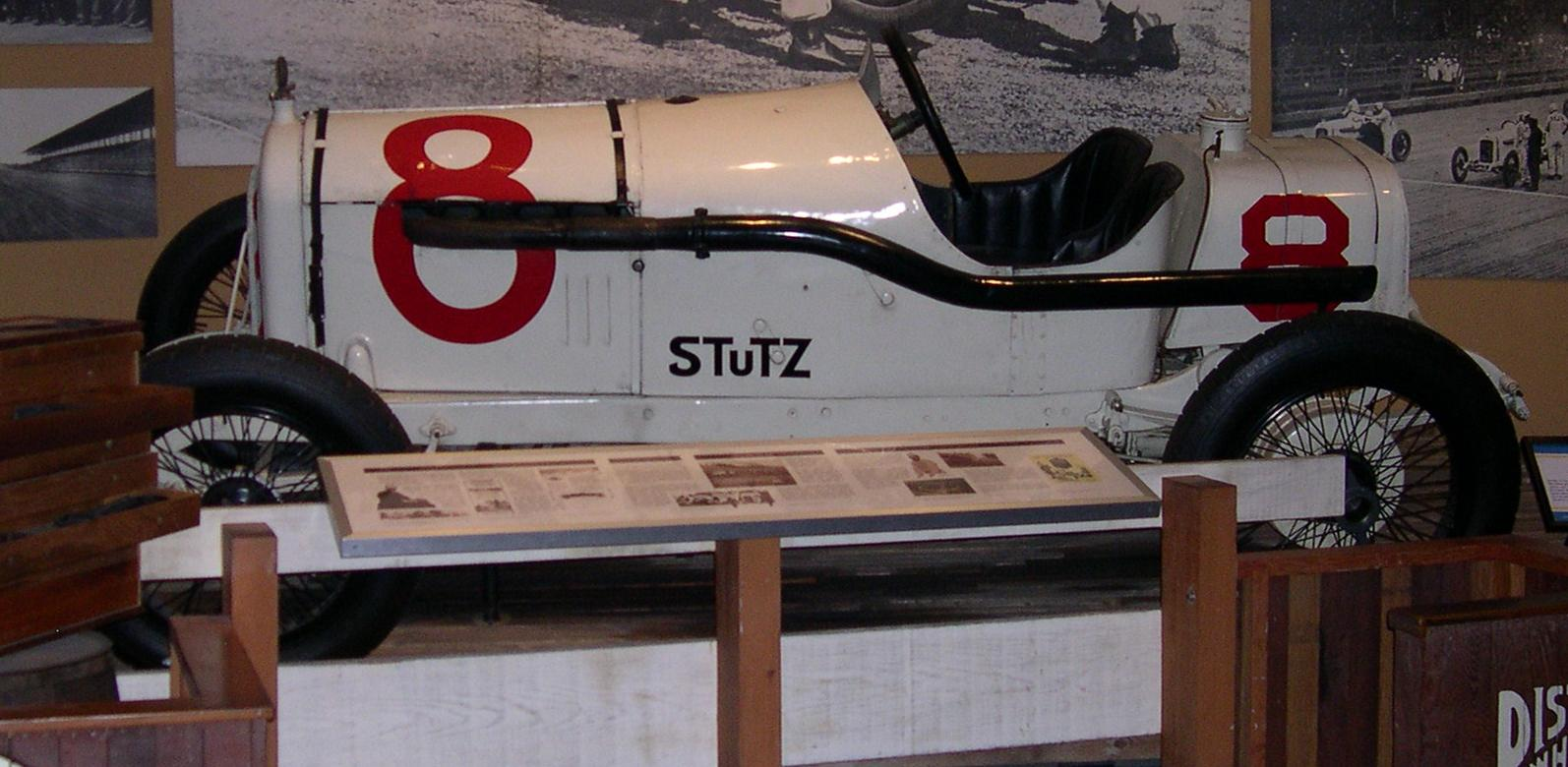
1915 Stutz White Squadron racer in the Petersen Automotive Museum

Its low weight, balance, and power made it an excellent racer. In 1912, Stutz Bearcats won 25 of the 30 auto races in which they were entered. In 1915 a stock Bearcat was driven by Erwin "Cannon Ball" Baker from California to New York in eleven days, seven hours, and fifteen minutes, shattering the previous record and inspiring the later Cannonball Run race and film spin-offs. The Stutz "White Squadron" factory racing team won the 1913 and 1915 championships.

== Prestige ==
Owning a Stutz Bearcat became a status symbol for the wealthy of the era. In 1914 it was priced at $2,000 (equivalent to $64,286 in 2025), almost four times that of the basic American-made Model T.

The colorful history and rakish image of the Stutz Bearcat made it one of the better known antique cars to later generations of Americans. It was often associated with the "Roaring 20s" and college students of that period. It was frequently mentioned with stereotypical accoutrements of the period such as raccoon coats and illicit "bathtub gin". The Velvet Underground's 1970 song "Sweet Jane" mentions a Stutz Bearcat to illustrate the bygone times described in the song.

That fame persisted well into the late 20th century and the car's name was often used by way of comparison by modern makes of cars including Nash, Triumph and Mercury. A Triumph ad asked the question "Is the TR 3 the Stutz Bearcat of the 60s?" and showed a Triumph driver, complete with raccoon coat, next to an early 1920s Bearcat, in a campus setting. Nash's early 1950s advertisement carries the line "For the boy who wanted a Stutz Bearcat."

== Replicas ==
Oklahoma City businessman Howard D. Williams attempted to capitalize on the model's fame. In the late 1960s, he built and marketed a fiber-glass replica of the car, based on the chassis of an International Scout utility vehicle. It was broadly similar in outline (bucket seats, exposed fuel tank) but differed from the original in having left hand drive and many visual differences. It was aimed at luxury car buyers as a unique runabout, but its high price limited sales. It is thought about a dozen were completed. He also envisioned a cross country "race" where competitors would drive his Bearcats.

Car customizer George Barris made two much more accurate replicas for the 1971 television series Bearcats!. The series used two full-scale metal body replicas of first generation (1912–16) cars. While externally very close to the original cars, they were in fact built on custom chassis powered by Ford drivetrains and had modern four-wheel brake systems for safety.

== 1970s–80s Bearcat ==
Stutz Bearcat
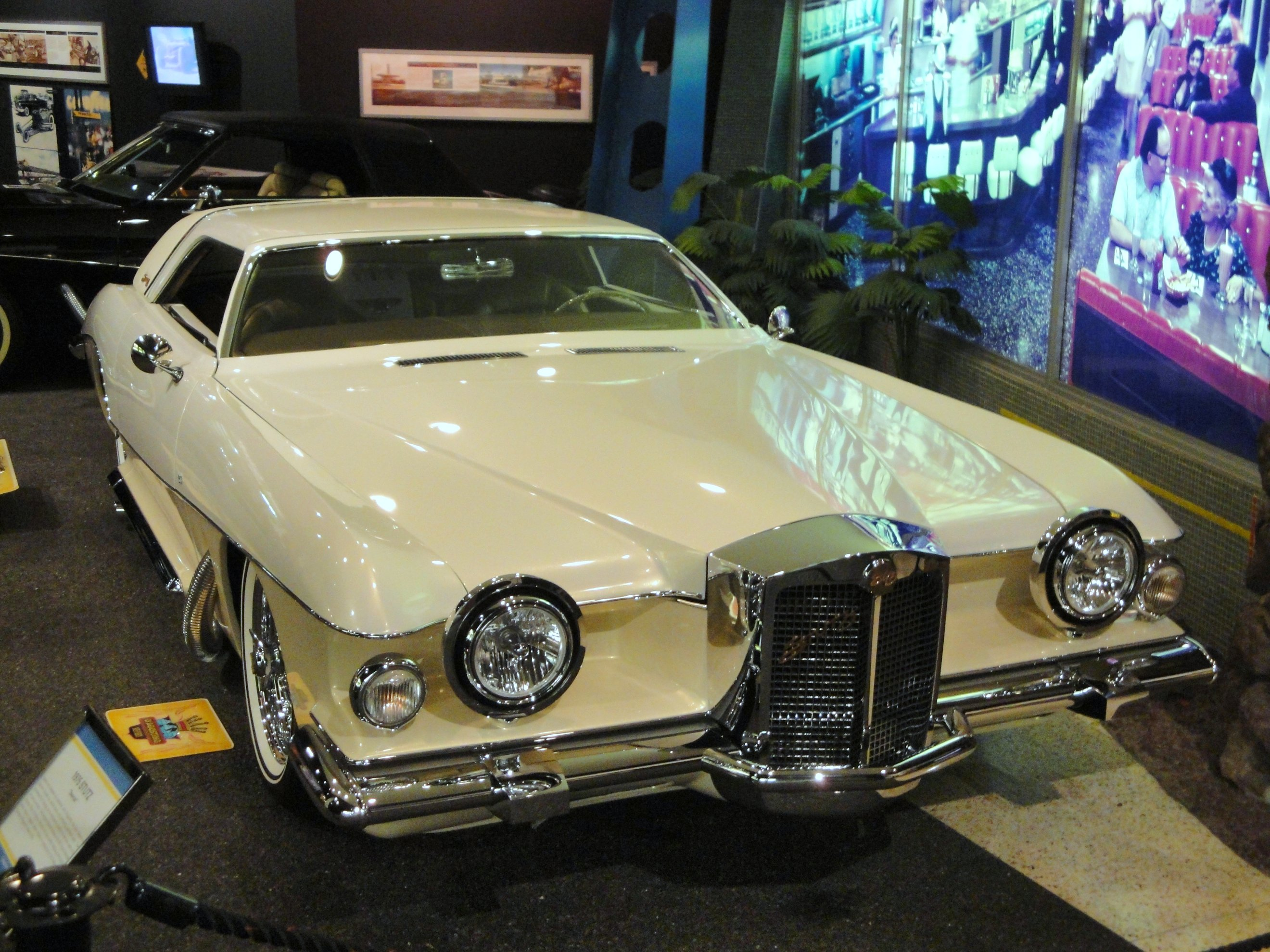

Overview
- Manufacturer: Stutz Motor Company
- Production: 1979–1992

Body and chassis
- Class: Sports car
- Body style: 2-door roadster
- Layout: FR layout

The Bearcat name was resurrected for the 1967 Stutz Motor Car of America design based on Virgil Exner's Duesenberg "Revival Car" concept. Because of design difficulties with this convertible, Stutz decided to produce the 1970 Blackhawk coupe first.

In 1976, a convertible called D'Italia based on a standard Blackhawk was presented at the Beverly Hills Hotel. The conversion was done by Dan Steckler, working for Stutz in California. Only one D'Italia was ever made, although others have done Blackhawk conversions as well (i.e. customizer John D'Agostino). Evel Knievel and Wayne Newton owned the car respectively. Elvis Presley also had a black Stutz with a red leather interior and a gold-plated gear stick. It was the last vehicle he drove, the night before he died. It is now housed along with a number of his other vehicles, at Graceland.

Because new (proposed) U.S. safety regulations were to require convertibles to have a rollbar, an open-air Bearcat was not manufactured until 1979. The new Bearcat used the GM A platform shared with the Blackhawk, and was essentially a Targa top coupe. Stutz offered it for $100,000 (equivalent to $443,604 in 2025). The Bearcat switched with the Blackhawk to the GM B platform in 1980, with the exterior continuing the Blackhawk's exposed trunk-mounted spare tire and freestanding headlamps.

In 1987, a completely new Bearcat convertible, called the Bearcat II, was introduced. The base platform was the GM F platform for 1987, with the trailing edge of the spare forming part of the car's rear bumper. The Bearcat II was based on the Pontiac Firebird chassis with 5.7-liter (350 in^{3}) V8 multi-port fuel-injected Corvette engine and had a lightweight, dent- and corrosion-proof body made of what Stutz called Diamond Fiber Comp., a kind of carbon-fiber composite. It retailed for $125,000 (equivalent to $354,240 in 2025), including a carbon-fiber hard top for use in winter and a matching luggage set. The German dealer Auto Becker in Düsseldorf offered the car with a 210 bhp, 5-litre (305 cu in), multi-port fuel-injected V8 and a galvanized chassis for 380,000 DM. The 5.7-litre (350 cu in) Corvette engine was an option. Just 12 or 13 Bearcat IIs were produced between 1987 and 1995. Notable owners included the Sultan of Brunei, who owned two.

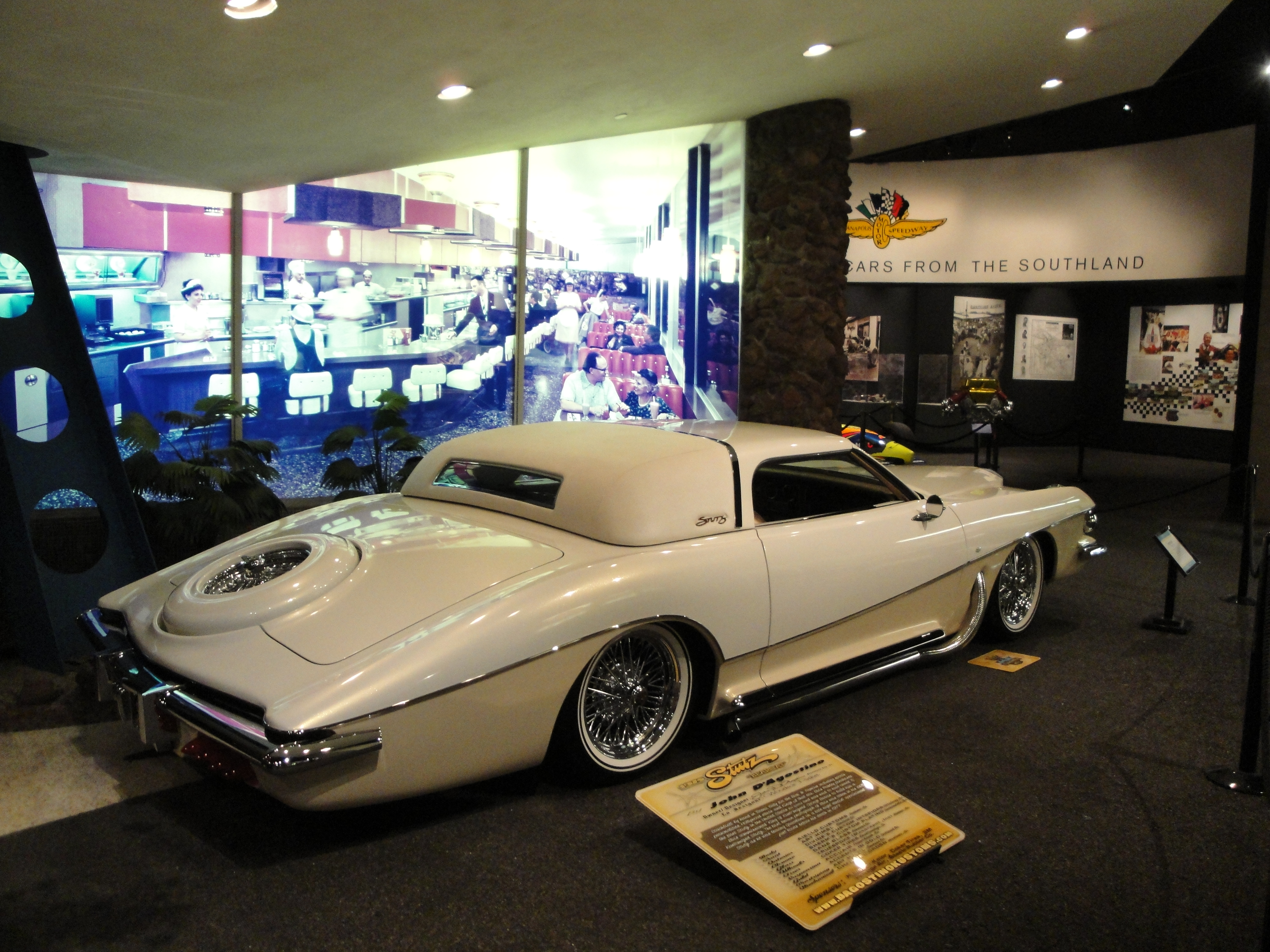
2010 John D'Agostino Bearcat based on the 1975 Stutz Blackhawk, with removable hardtop and suicide doors.

== Cultural references ==
In the episode "The Trouble with Trillions" of The Simpsons, Waylon Smithers drives a maroon Stutz Bearcat with Mr. Burns and Homer.

Maureen O'Hara drives a 1914 Stutz Bearcat in On Wings of Eagles 1957.

'The Bearcats' television show 1971.

The lyrics of the song "Sweet Jane" by The Velvet Underground mention the Stutz Bearcat.

In the S02E12 episode "Krelboyne Girl" of Malcolm in the Middle, Commandant Edwin Spangler questions the cadets to find out who "took his '37 Stutz Bearcat for a joyride in a cornfield."

== See also ==
- Mercer Raceabout
