= Plymouth XNR =

Chrysler concept car of 1960

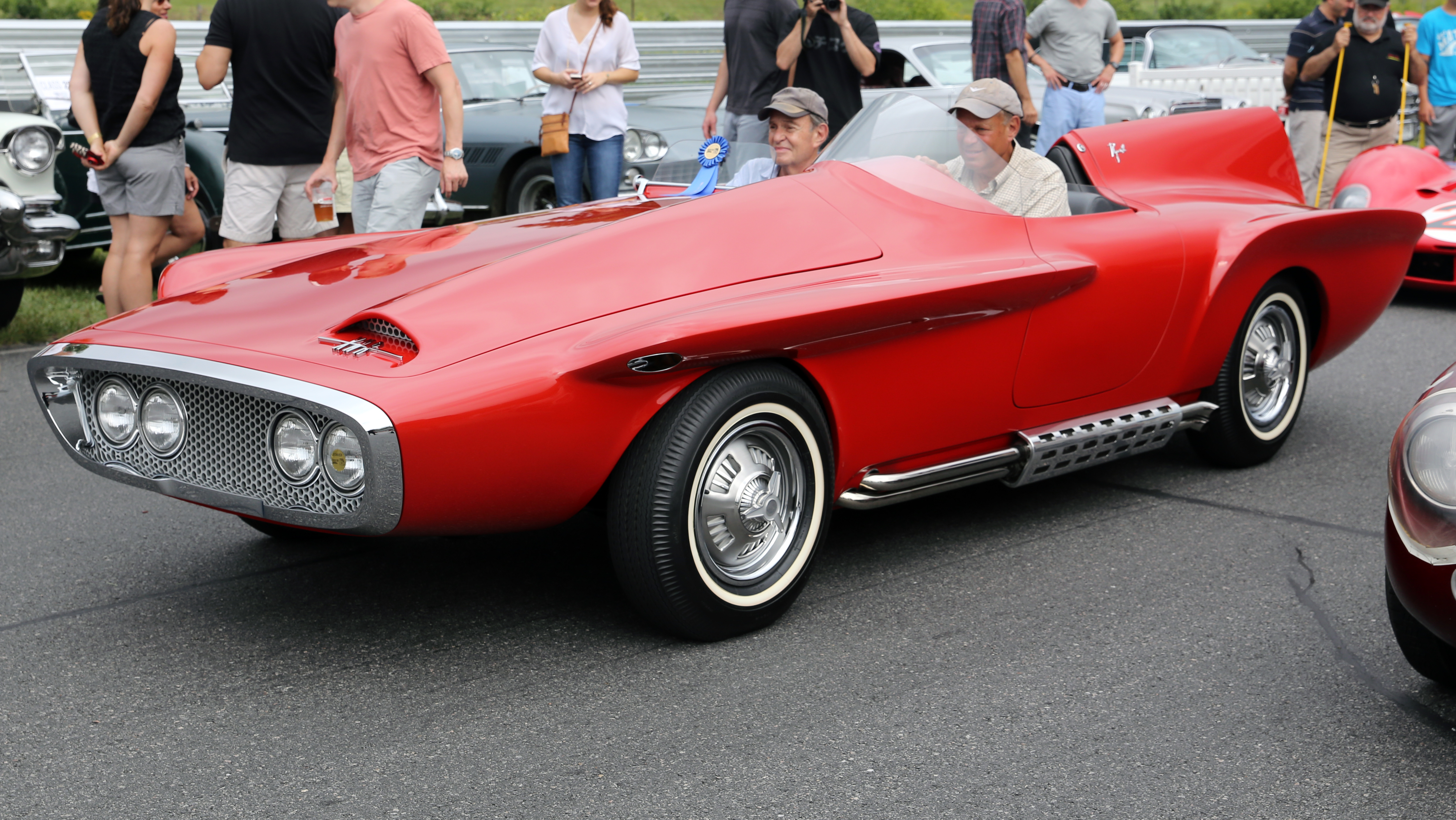
- The 1960 Plymouth XNR concept car at the 2014 Lime Rock Concours d'Élégance.

Overview
- Manufacturer: Ghia
- Also called: XNR 500
- Model years: 1960
- Designer: Virgil Exner

Body and chassis
- Class: Concept car
- Body style: Roadster
- Layout: FR layout
- Platform: Valiant
- Doors: 2
- Related: Asimmetrica by Ghia

Powertrain
- Engine: 170 cu in (2.8 L) Chrysler Slant-6
- Transmission: 3-speed manual

Dimensions
- Wheelbase: 106.5 in (2,705 mm)
- Length: 195.2 in (4,958 mm)
- Width: 71 in (1,803 mm)
- Height: 43 in (1,092 mm)

The Plymouth XNR is a concept car developed by Chrysler. It was designed by Virgil Exner, and first shown in 1960. Also called the XNR 500, the car is an open roadster with some asymmetric features, and was proposed as a sporty addition to the Plymouth model lineup, and as competition for the Chevrolet Corvette.

== History ==
Automobile designer Virgil Exner left Studebaker to join Chrysler in 1949. Chrysler's previous designers favored conservative, upright bodystyles, but sales were declining. At Chrysler, one of his first challenges was to wrest final say over design away from the engineering department.

Exner commissioned a range of concept cars that were built in Italy by Carrozzeria Ghia. Among these were several sporty, open-top, two-seat cars, including three out of four of the cars in the Dodge Firearrow series, and the Chrysler Falcon. These studies were Chrysler's answer to the Ford Thunderbird and Chevrolet Corvette.

The XNR went through several name changes during development. Some early drawings label it the "Falcon". This was also the development name of the car that became the production Valiant, until Ford registered it for their own new compact. Later the car was called the Asymmetrica, and later still renamed "XNR", a disemvoweled, pseudo-acronym of the designer's own last name.

The shape of the XNR was influenced by a Studebaker Indianapolis race car that Exner owned, as well as by the later asymmetrical Watson Indy Roadster, and the Jaguar D-Type.

As originally built, the car reached a speed of 146 mph (235 km/h) on Chrysler's test track. Exner is said to have personally driven the car on the track at speeds up to 142 mph (229 km/h). Later, after being fitted with a fiberglass nosecone fabricated by Dick Burke and receiving additional engine modifications, the car reached a top speed of 153 mph (246 km/h).

In May 1960, the XNR appeared on the covers of both Road & Track and Motor Trend magazines, then in May 1961 on the cover of Today's Motor Sports magazine.

The car made its first public appearance at the 1960 New York Auto Show.

Chrysler did not put the Plymouth XNR into production. Exner wanted to buy the car from Chrysler, but was unsuccessful. The XNR was shipped back to Ghia in Italy to prevent it from being destroyed.

After being returned to Ghia, the XNR was purchased by a Swiss buyer, who later sold it to Mohammad Reza Pahlavi, the Shah of Iran. After that it was sold again, this time to Anwar al Mulla, a Kuwaiti car dealer. During Mulla's ownership the XNR appeared in a photo taken in Kuwait in the May 1969 issue of National Geographic. It was sold again in the early 1970s to a man in Lebanon who kept it in underground storage until Karim Edde found the car during the Lebanese Civil War of 1975–1991 and recognized it. Edde acquired the car and kept moving it to various locations to protect it from damage during the fighting. After the war Edde sent the car to RM Restorations in Canada in 2008 for a full restoration.

The restoration was completed in March 2011, after which the car was reintroduced at that year's Amelia Island Concours d'Elegance. In August of the same year the XNR won the Gran Turismo Trophy at the Pebble Beach Concours d'Elegance.

On 18 August 2012, the XNR sold for $935,000 at RM Sotheby's Monterey auction.

== Features ==
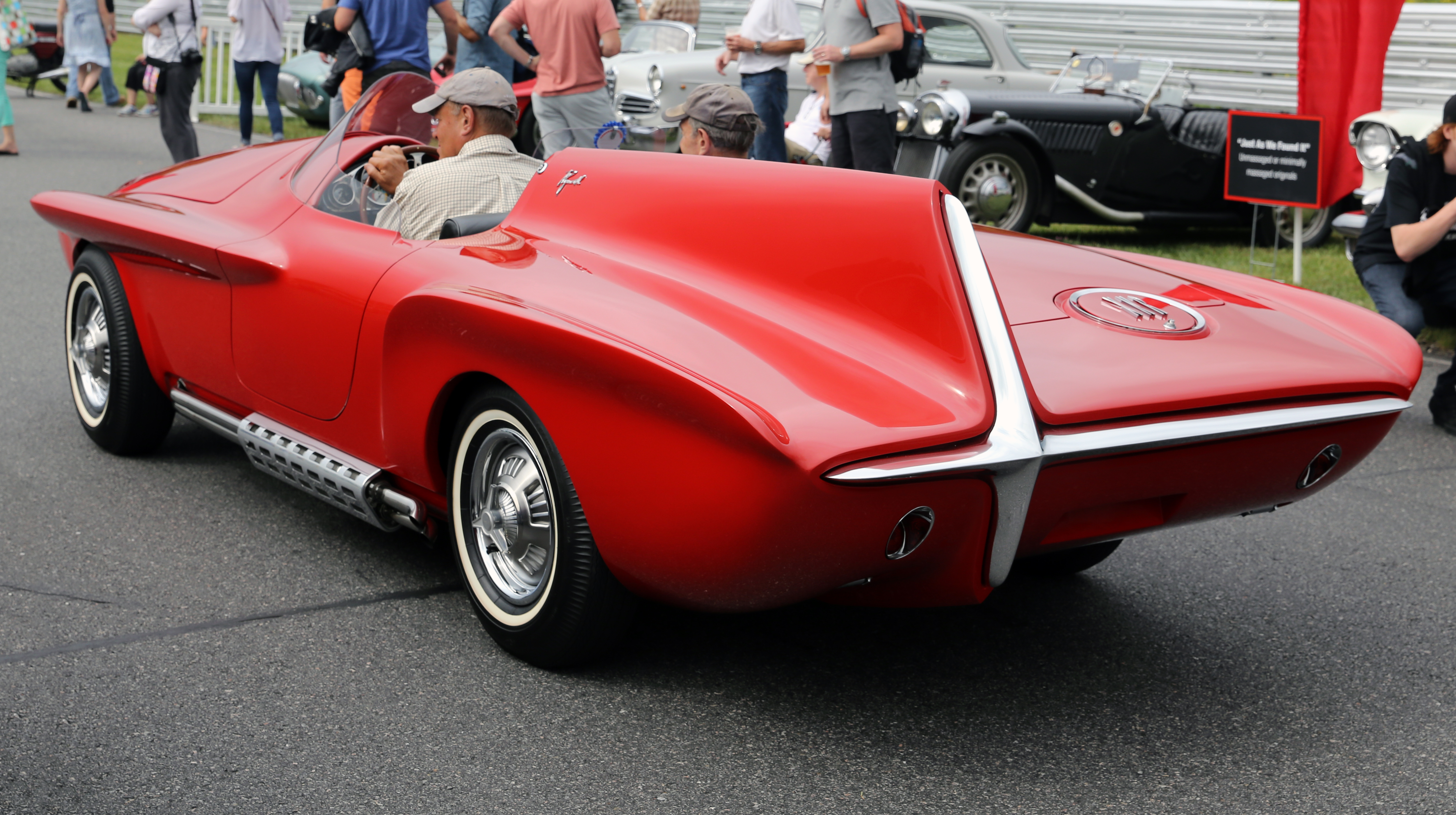
Rear three-quarter view

The XNR uses both the chassis and "G-Series" Slant-6 straight-six engine from the Valiant, both of which were new for the 1960 model year.

In Chrysler's Slant-6, the row of cylinders is inclined 30° from vertical. There are two common models of the engine; the LG, with a deck height of 9.06 in (230.1 mm), and the RG, with a deck height of 10.680 in (271.3 mm). The LG has a bore and stroke of 3.40 in × 3.125 in (86.4 mm × 79.4 mm), and displaces 170 cu in (2.8 L). The RG has a bore of 3.40 in (86 mm), and a stroke of either 3.64 in (92.5 mm) or 4.125 in (104.8 mm), for displacements of 198 cu in (3.2 L) and 225 cu in (3.7 L) respectively. Connecting rod lengths vary from engine to engine. The XNR is fitted with a 170 cubic inch LG, which is the only version low enough to fit under the car's hood.

The engine was fitted with Chrysler's Hyper Pak performance package. A 170 cubic inch Slant-6 with Hyper Pak typically developed around 148 hp (110 kW). Apart from the Hyper Pak kit, the engine in the XNR is distinguished by being one of just twelve Slant-6s built to "NASCAR" specifications, which included other upgrades. It is thus related to the engines that powered Slant-6 Valiants to the first seven positions in the inaugural Cannonball Compact Car Division NASCAR race held in January 1960 at Daytona. A power output of 250 hp (186 kW) is often quoted for the engine in the XNR.

The XNR was built on the compact-sized unitary chassis of the Valiant, which was cut down and then had its sills reinforced for use in the roadster. This modified chassis was shipped to Ghia in Italy, who built an armature, or body buck, and then formed the car's body in steel over it.

The side elevation of the XNR's body has features that are exaggerated versions of the body language used on the first generation Valiant and second generation Dodge Lancer. The asymmetric aspect of the design consists of an offset hood scoop and long power bump behind it on the driver's side that continues behind the driver as a tall headrest that tapers into a fin.

The XNR seats two, but the passenger's seat is set back and mounted 4 in (102 mm) lower than the driver's, and has a separate, smaller wind deflector ahead of it on the scuttle that can be folded flat forward out of the way, instead of the curved windscreen in front of the driver. A rigid steel tonneau cover for over the passenger side effectively converts the car into a single seater.

Exner's interested in photography and photographic equipment is reflected in some features of the XNR. The glass covers over the dash gauges mimic camera lenses, and the glove box insert was removable, and could be used as a camera case.

In the front, quad headlamps are mounted in a perforated aluminum grille with a chrome border that serves as a bumper. In the rear is a narrow chrome cruciform bumper, whose main leg stretches across the back and is intersected by another, shorter leg that starts below the main bumper and extends up the trailing edge of the rear fin.

== Technical data ==
	Plymouth XNR specifications:
Type:	Concept car / Roadster
Body stylist:	Virgil Exner
Production:	1
Driven wheels	Rear
Engine:	Chrysler Slant-6 straight-six engine with Hyper Pak performance package
Engine materials:	Cast iron block, cast iron cylinder head
Bore × Stroke:	3.4 in × 3.125 in (86 mm × 79 mm)
Displacement:	170 cu in (2.8 L)
Compression ratio:	10.5:1
Maximum power:	250 bhp (186 kW) (est.) at 7000 rpm
Maximum torque:	200 ft⋅lb (271 N⋅m) (est.) at 5000 rpm
Valvetrain:	Single cam-in-block, pushrods, rocker arms, 2 overhead valves per cylinder
Induction:	Carter AFB 3083S four-barrel carburetor
Cooling:	Water-cooled
Transmission:	3-speed manual
Steering:	Recirculating ball
Brakes f/r:	9.0 in (229 mm) drum / 9.0 in (229 mm) drum
Suspension front:	Double wishbone suspension, torsion bar springs, hydraulic shock absorbers
Suspension rear:	Live axle on semi-elliptic leaf springs, hydraulic shock absorbers
Body/Chassis:	Steel body on Valiant unitary chassis
Track f/r:	Not available
Wheelbase:	106.5 in (2,705 mm)
Tyres f/r:	8.00 × 14
Length; Width; Height:	195.5 in (4,966 mm); 71 in (1,803 mm); 43 in (1,092 mm)
Weight:	Not available
Maximum speed:	153 mph (246 km/h)

== XNR Replica ==
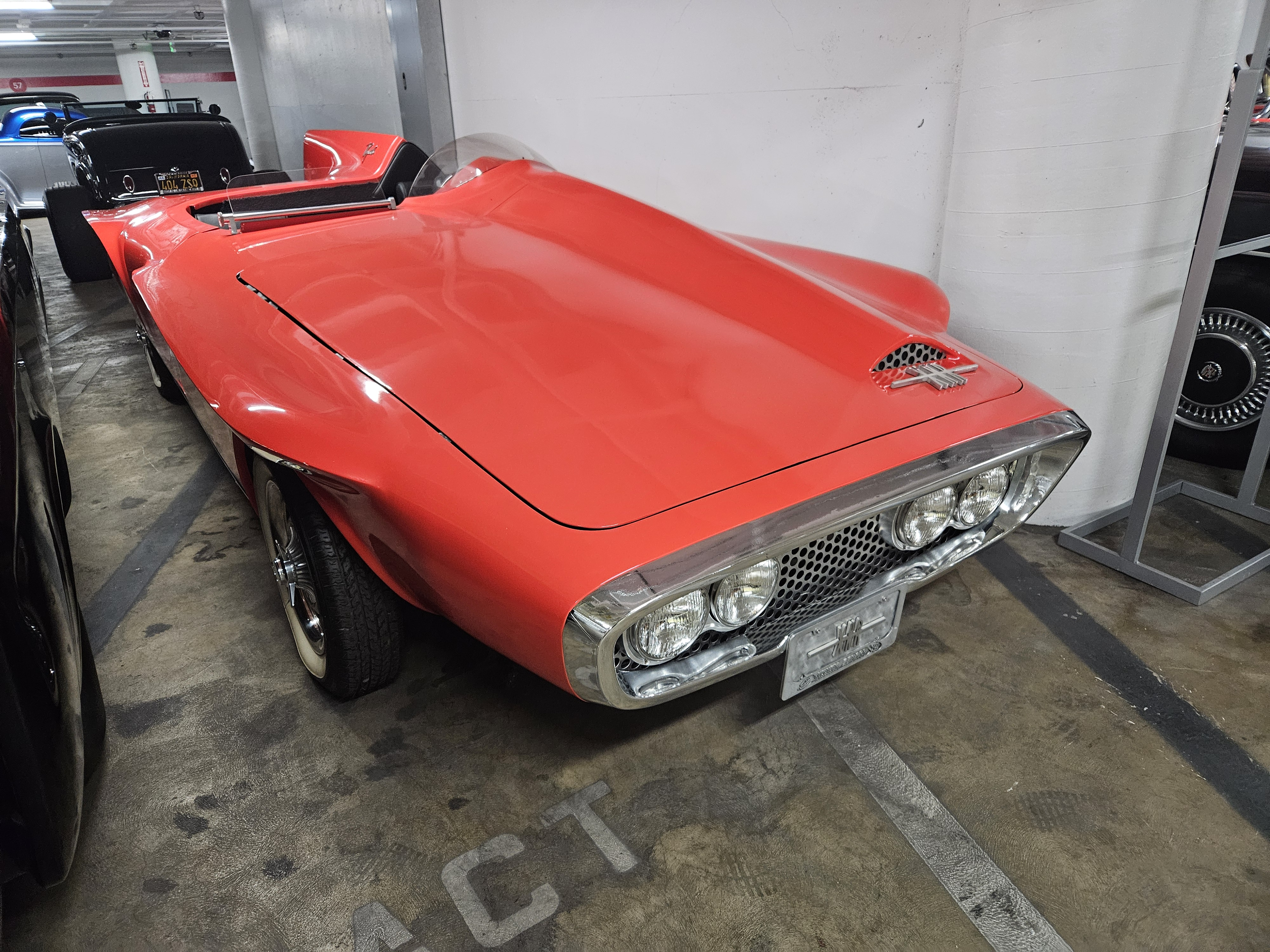
XNR replica at Petersen Automotive Museum

A full-scale replica of the XNR was built by the Gotham Garage company headed by Mark Towle. The build was featured on Netflix Car Masters: Rust to Riches.

The body for the Gotham Garage car was created in fiberglass by Starr Creations in Florida.

The finished replica was donated to the Petersen Automotive Museum in Los Angeles, California A second XNR replica by Gotham Garage was built, and then sold at the start of Season 3.

== Asimmetrica by Ghia ==
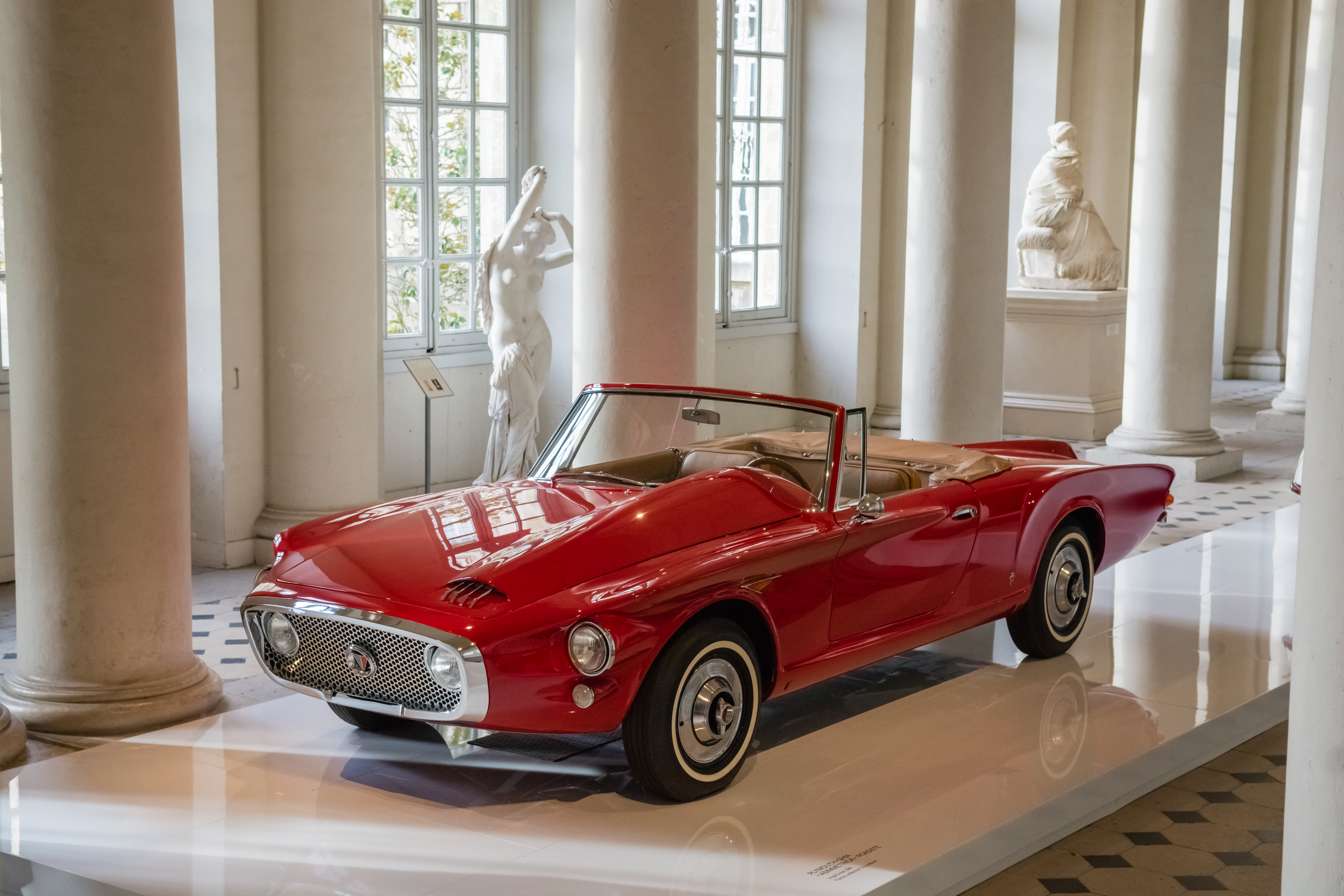
Asimmetrica Roadster by Ghia

In October 1961, Ghia presented the Asimmetrica at the Turin Motor Show. It was displayed without naming a manufacturer for the car. The Asimmetrica is described as a more subdued interpretation of the XNR's design language.

It is unclear how much input Exner had on the Asimmetrica's design. One possibility is that the shape was drawn by Exner, but that the designer left Chrysler before the car was complete. Another suggestion is that the car was created entirely by Ghia, and was styled by Luigi Segre.

The body of the Asimmetrica was fabricated using the same body bucks that Ghia had originally built for the XNR. This car is closer to a production vehicle than its predecessor, with features that were omitted on the XNR, such as door handles, a full windshield, and, although often termed a roadster, a full folding top. The XNR's off-center power bulge and rear fin remained, although the fin was substantially reduced, and one of each pair of headlamps was moved from the grille to a pod faired into the front sides of the front fenders, leaving just two headlamps in the narrower grille opening. The marker lamp recessed into the front lower side of the front wheelarch brow was also moved to a pod below the headlamp.

Like the XNR, the Asimmetrica is built on a Valiant chassis, and is powered by a Slant-6 engine with the Hyper Pak performance package.

It is reported that Ghia hoped to put the car into limited production themselves, but was unable to arrange financing. Some sources also suggest that a run of twenty-five of the cars was planned, but that only one or two were completed.

In March 1962, a related hardtop version, called the Coupé St. Régis, was shown alongside the Asimmetrica at the Geneva Auto show.

The Asimmetrica at the Geneva show was sold to French author Georges Simenon following the event. It was later sold by Rob de la Rive Box and Roger Meyer to the Blackhawk Collection, where it underwent an extensive restoration lasting a full year, after which it was shown at the 1990 Pebble Beach Concours d'Elegance. The car was then sold to a collector in the American Pacific Northwest.

An Asimmetrica was sold at RM Sotheby's 2018 Monterey Car Week auction for $335,000 (inclusive of applicable buyer's fee). The chassis number of this car was 1102224086, indicating that it began life as a Valiant V100 four-door sedan with a basic LG engine making 101 hp (75.3 kW), and was built in 1960 at what was then Chrysler's Hamtramck assembly plant.
