= Chrysler Falcon =

1955 Chrysler concept car by Ghia

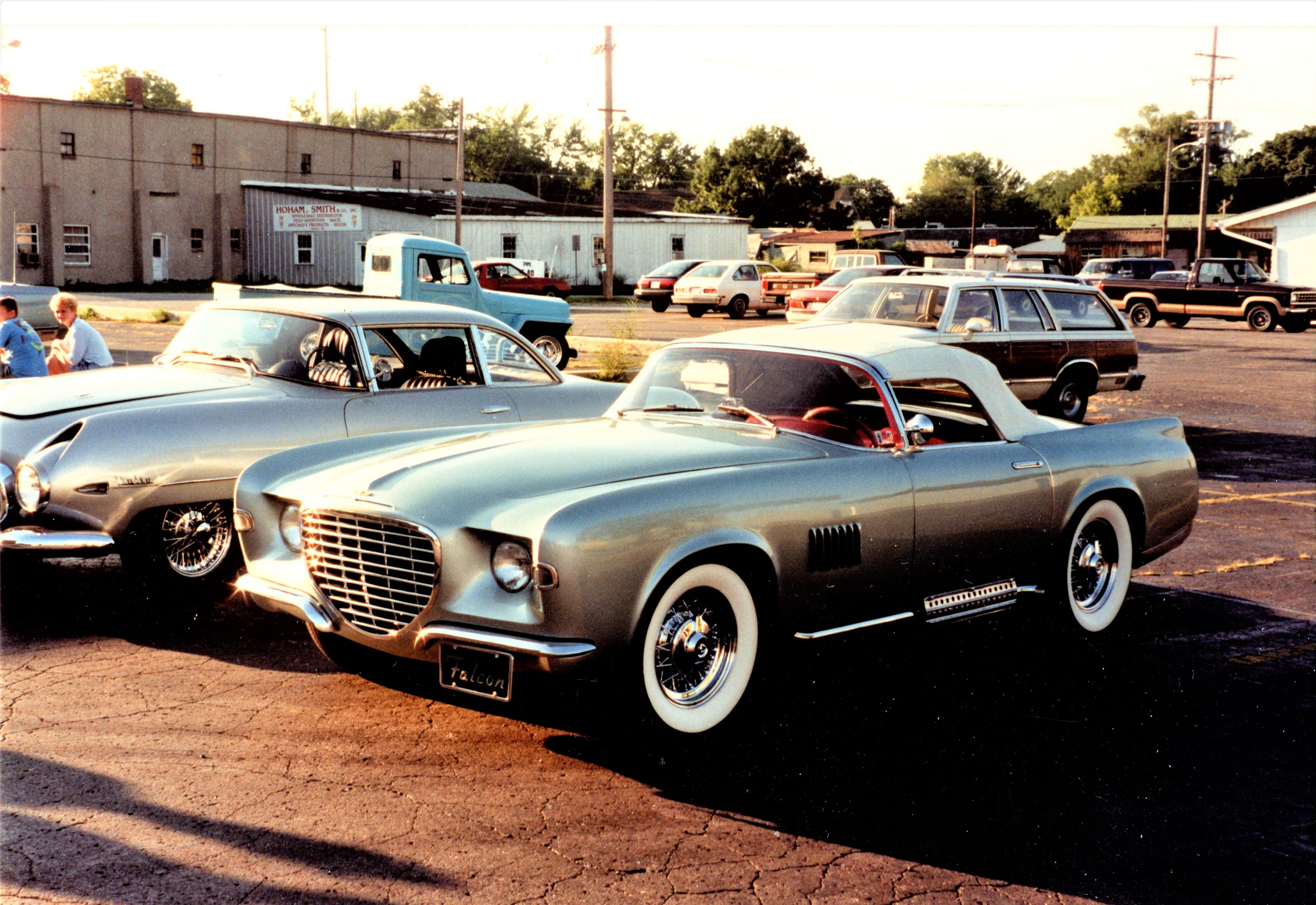

Overview
- Manufacturer: Carrozzeria Ghia
- Also called: Model A-488 / Model A-489
- Designer: Maurice Baldwin; Virgil Exner

Body and chassis
- Body style: 2-door convertible
- Layout: F/R layout
- Platform: Chrysler C-300

Powertrain
- Engine: 331 cu in (5.4 L) FirePower V8; 276 cu in (4.5 L) FireDome V8
- Transmission: 2-speed PowerFlite automatic

Dimensions
- Wheelbase: 105 in (2,667 mm)
- Length: 182 in (4,623 mm)
- Width: 68.25 in (1,734 mm)
- Height: 51.125 in (1,299 mm)
- Curb weight: 3,300 lb (1,497 kg)

The Chrysler Falcon is a two-seat roadster concept car commissioned by Chrysler and built by Carrozzeria Ghia for the 1955 model year. The car was never put into production, but some of its features reappeared on later Chrysler designs.

== History ==
Automobile designer Virgil Exner left Studebaker to join Chrysler in 1949. Chrysler's previous designers favored conservative, upright bodystyles, but sales were declining. Exner was personally recruited to become head of Chrysler's Advanced Styling Studio by Kauffman Thuma (K.T.) Keller, who was first President, then Chairman of the Board of Chrysler, to overcome Chrysler's reputation for uninspiring design, and to spur sales.

Exner commissioned a range of what he called "Idea cars" to explore new design concepts. Most of these cars were built in Italy by Ghia. Among them were several sporty, open-top, two-seat cars, including the 1955 Chrysler Falcon. The Falcon is often described as Chrysler's answer to the Ford Thunderbird and Chevrolet Corvette.

Much of the actual design of the Falcon is credited to Maurice Baldwin.

The Chrysler Falcon debuted on 17 August 1955 at the Chrysler International Salon, alongside the Flight Sweep I and Flight Sweep II.

The Falcon incorporated many parts and assemblies from existing Chrysler products, and could be built with production methods already in place. The cars that were built were considered pre-production examples, with the expectation that the Falcon would go into full production. Ultimately, Chrysler's Engineering staff scuttled these plans.

A Chrysler Falcon is reported to have been shipped back to Ghia in Italy, and from there to South America. A Chrysler Falcon was offered as the prize in a 1955 fundraiser for the Venezuelan Red Cross. The car was made available through the sponsorship of "C.A. El Automóvil Universal de Occidente", the official Chrysler representative in Venezuela at the time. By the middle of the 1970s the car had been returned to North America, and was owned by Paul Stern. After a few more changes of ownership, in the late 1980s it became part of the collection of owner Joe Bortz.

Moving on from the Idea Cars, Exner's influence reached Chrysler's production lineup with the debut of the Forward Look models in 1955 and the major restyling of the lineup in 1957.

Some of the Falcon's styling elements would be used in other Chrysler designs. The Falcon's egg-crate grille later appeared on the 1957–59 Chrysler 300. Its exposed side exhaust pipes appeared on the 1960 Plymouth XNR, but only on the driver's side of this Slant-6 powered concept, and then again many years later on the 1992 Dodge Viper. The Falcon is in fact referred to as "Exner's Viper" by Daimler-Chrysler.

Years later Chrysler planned to reuse the Falcon name for their new-for-1960 Plymouth Valiant compact, but it was the Ford Motor Company who released the Ford Falcon production car with the name. There are two explanations for the change. One holds that Henry Ford II asked Chrysler for permission to use the name, which Chrysler gave. The other says that Ford registered the name before Chrysler was able to, forcing Chrysler to scramble for a new name for their own car by sponsoring a contest among their employees.

== Number built ==
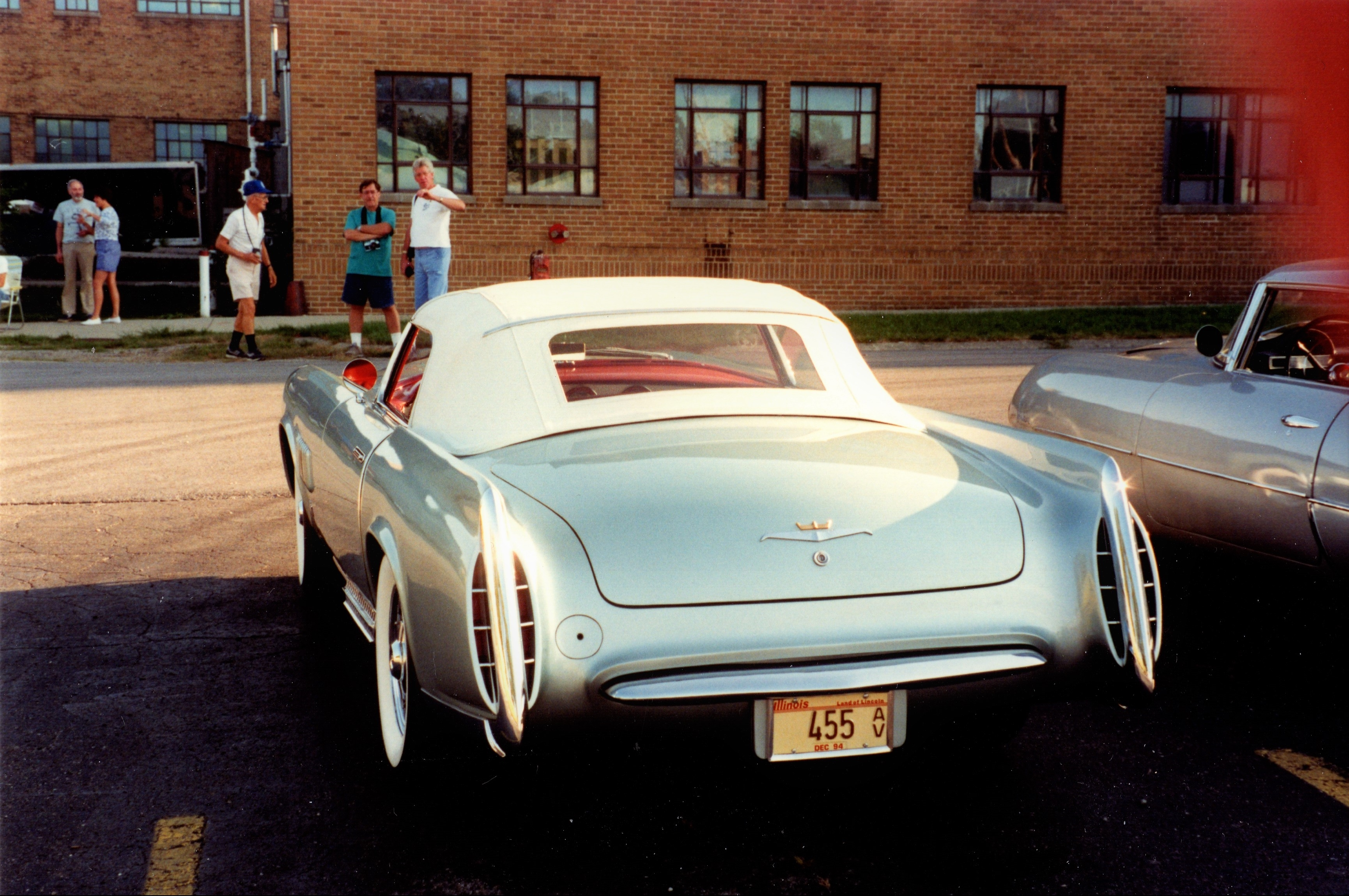
Rear view

For some time it was believed that only one Chrysler Falcon was built. It is now generally accepted that at least two Falcons were completed. This is in part based on observed differences in the bodies of cars in original photos of the Falcon.

The first car built was painted black, and was used by Exner as his personal vehicle. Exner also drove the car in some SCCA events. The fate of this car is currently unknown, but there is no record of it having been destroyed.

Some references suggest that as many as three cars were built. This is based on the existence of a letter from Ghia designer Luigi Segre that refers to three cars: one described as a “DeSoto Sports Roadster” (Model A-489), and the others as Chrysler Sports Roadsters (Model A-488).

== Features ==
The Chrysler Falcon is built on a unitary chassis. It is a modified version of the Chrysler C-300 platform. Overall weight is 3,300 lb (1,497 kg).

Two different models of Chrysler's first generation "Double rocker" Hemi V8 were used in the cars. One was the Chrysler FirePower V8 that displaced 331 cu in (5.4 L), while the other was the DeSoto FireDome V8 that displaced 276 cu in (4.5 L). The 331 and 276 differ not only in their bore and stroke, which are 3.8125 in × 3.625 in (96.84 mm × 92.08 mm) for the Chrysler V8, and 3.625 in × 3.344 in (92.08 mm × 84.94 mm) for the DeSoto engine, but also in their bore pitch, which are 4.5625 in (115.89 mm) for the FirePower and 4.3125 in (109.54 mm) for the FireDome. The Bortz car has its original 331 cubic inch FirePower V8.

The transmission is a 2-speed PowerFlite automatic. It is controlled by a floor-mounted lever on the interior. Other interior features include leather upholstery, an adjustable split-bench seat, concave inner door panels, power windows, and a wooden steering wheel by Nardi.

The brakes are drums at all wheels. Both the brakes and the steering are power assisted.

== Technical data ==
	Chrysler Falcon specifications:
Type:	Concept car / Roadster
Body stylist:	Maurice Baldwin; Virgil Exner
Production:	3
Driven wheels	Rear
Engine:	Chrysler FirePower V8; DeSoto FireDome V8
Engine materials:	Cast iron block and cylinder heads
Bore × Stroke:	3.8125 in × 3.625 in (96.84 mm × 92.08 mm) (FirePower V8); 3.625 in × 3.344 in (92.08 mm × 84.94 mm) (FireDome V8)
Displacement:	331 cu in (5.4 L) (FirePower V8); 276 cu in (4.5 L) (FireDome V8)
Compression ratio:	7.5:1 (FirePower V8); 7.5:1 (FireDome V8)
Maximum power:	195 bhp (145 kW) at 4400 rpm (FirePower V8); 170 bhp (127 kW) at 4400 rpm (FireDome V8)
Maximum torque:	260 ft⋅lb (353 N⋅m) at 2400 rpm (FirePower V8); 255 ft⋅lb (346 N⋅m) at 2000 rpm (FireDome V8)
Valvetrain:	Single cam-in-block, pushrods, rocker arms, 2 overhead valves per cylinder
Induction:	2 barrel Carter BBD carburetor (FirePower V8); 2 barrel Stromberg carburetor (FireDome V8)
Cooling:	Water-cooled
Transmission:	2-speed TorqueFlite automatic
Steering:	Recirculating ball
Brakes f/r:	Drum / drum
Suspension front:	Double wishbone suspension, Coil springs, tubular shock absorbers
Suspension rear:	Live axle on leaf springs, tubular shock absorbers
Body/Chassis:	Steel body on shortened Chrysler C-300 unitary chassis
Track f/r:	Not available
Wheelbase:	105 in (2,667 mm)
Tires and wheels:	7.60 × 15 tires on 15 inch wire wheels
Length; Width; Height:	182 in (4,623 mm); 68.25 in (1,734 mm); 51.125 in (1,299 mm)
Weight:	3,300 lb (1,497 kg)
0–60 mph (0–97 km/h):	10 seconds
Quarter mile:	17.5 seconds
Top speed:	115 mph (185 km/h)
