= C20 =

C20 or C-20 may refer to:

== Science and technology ==
- Carbon-20 (C-20 or ^{20}C), an isotope of carbon
- C_{20}, the smallest possible fullerene (a carbon molecule)
- C20 (engineering), a mix of concrete that has a compressive strength of 20 newtons per square millimeter
- Malignant neoplasm of rectum, a type of colorectal cancer (ICD-10 code: C20)
- Caldwell 20 or North America Nebula, an emission nebula in the constellation Cygnus
- Eicosane (USA) or n-icosane (international), CH3-(CH2)18-CH3 or C20H42(s), a linear (straight-chain) alkane
- IEC 60320 C20, a polarised, three pole socket electrical connector
- C20 (Capacity, 20 hours), C100 (100 hours), battery capacity

== Transportation and military ==
- Colt Canada C20 DMR, a Canadian designated marksman rifle
- HMS C20, a 1910 British C-class submarine
- Sauber C20, a 2001 racing car
- SL C20, a type of rolling stock used in the Stockholm metro
- HMS Tiger (C20), a cruiser of the Royal Navy
- C-20, the proposed in-service designation of the Fokker F-32
- C-20A/B/C/D/E, variants of the Gulfstream III
- C-20F/G/H/J, variants of the Gulfstream IV
- C20 is a version of the Allison Model 250 aircraft engine

== Other uses ==
- Bill C-20, the Canadian Clarity Act
- OMX Copenhagen 20, Denmark's primary stock market index
- King's Pawn Game, a chess opening (Encyclopaedia of Chess Openings code: C20)
- The Twentieth Century Society, a British charity which campaigns for the preservation of architectural heritage from 1914 onwards
- C20 Cities, now expanded to the C40 Cities Climate Leadership Group
- Dr. Gero/C20, a character in Dragon Ball Z (1989)
