= Chrysler C-200 =

Motor vehicle

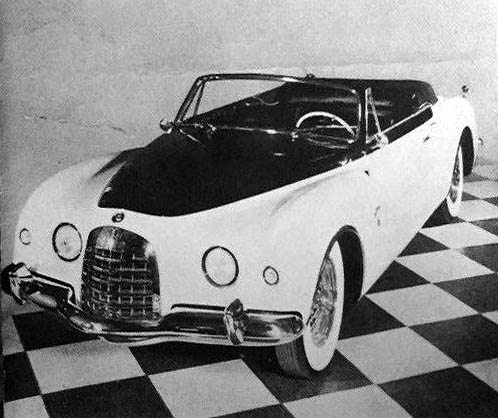
Promotional photo of the C-200

The Chrysler C-200 was a concept car released in 1952 by Chrysler.

== Beginnings ==
The C-200 was designed by Virgil Exner. He and his small team designed the car at Chrysler Corporation in Detroit, Michigan. It was built by Carrozzeria Ghia, a company in Turin, Italy. The base price was $20,000. The car had the power of an American Chrysler V8 in an Italian sports car style body. The interior was upholstered in black leather and the exterior paint schem was a two-toned pale green and black. The 'gun-sight' taillight design was featured on later Chrysler production models.
