= Watson Indy Roadster =

Single-seat racing car

- Category: U.S.A.C. IndyCar

Technical specifications
- Suspension: Solid axles and torsion bar suspension, dual shock absorbers
- Length: 186 in (4,724.4 mm)
- Width: 58 in (1,473.2 mm)
- Height: 44 in (1,117.6 mm)
- Axle track: 52 in (1,320.8 mm) (front); 54 in (1,371.6 mm) (rear)
- Wheelbase: 96 in (2,438.4 mm)
- Engine: Offenhauser 255–270 cu in (4.2–4.4 L) 16-valve, DOHC I4, naturally-aspirated, FR
- Transmission: Offenhauser 2-speed manual
- Power: > 425–450 hp (317–336 kW) @ 6000 rpm 550 lb⋅ft (746 N⋅m) torque
- Weight: 1,550 lb (703.1 kg)

Competition history

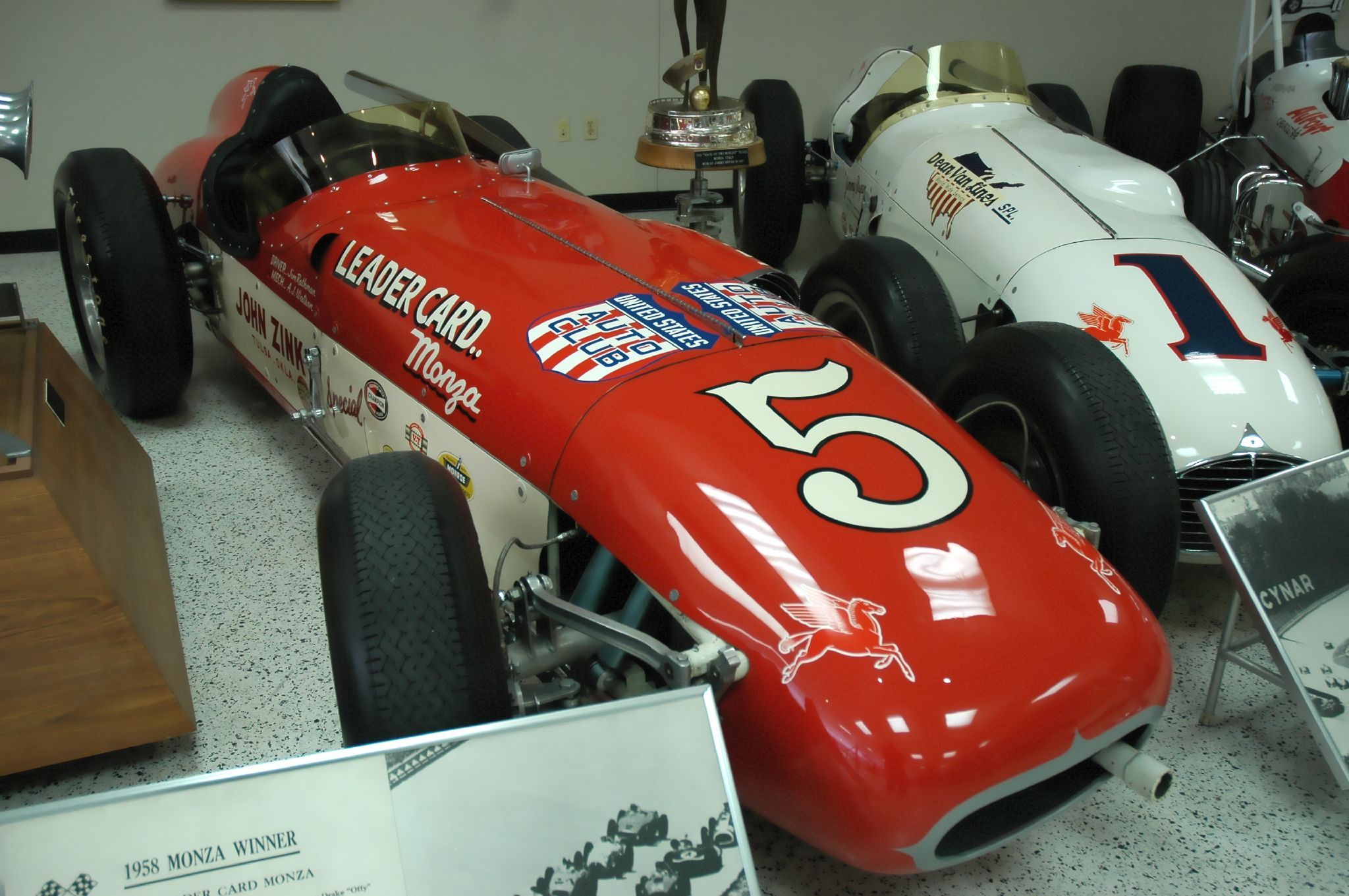
A 1958 Watson-Offenhauser which won the Race of Two Worlds in Monza, Italy.

The Watson Indy Roadster was an open-wheel race car chassis designed and developed by automotive mechanic and engineer A. J. Watson for U.S.A.C. Indy car racing, between 1956 and 1964.
