= Exner Revival Cars =

Defunct American motor vehicle manufacturer

Exner Revival Cars were created by noted automobile designer, Virgil Exner. He produced a series of "Revival Car" concepts for a December 1963 issue of Esquire magazine. His designs included an updated model for four famous American marques: Stutz, Duesenberg, Packard, and Mercer. He later designed updated Bugatti, Pierce-Arrow, and Jordan cars. Little came of these designs, though they became well known as plastic model kits produced by Renwal.

A show version of the Bugatti was built by Ghia on the last Bugatti Type 101 chassis. The Bugatti Revival Car concept was shown at the Turin Motor Show in 1965 but at the time it failed to spark another revival of that marque.

Exner's Mercer design was also produced as a concept car. A body was crafted for a shortened (by 18 in (457 mm)) Shelby Cobra chassis, and the Mercer-Cobra was presented in 1965.

Exner's Duesenberg revival had the most success. Exner penned a new design for 1966, and a company was formed under Fritz Duesenberg, son of August Duesenberg to produce the cars on Chrysler Imperial chassis. A prototype was again produced by Ghia, and 50 buyers signed up, including Elvis Presley and Jerry Lewis. The company fell on financial trouble before production could begin, however, with the prototype seized as payment of outstanding debts.
