= Bill C-20 =

Bill C-20 refers to various legislation introduced into the House of Commons of Canada, including:

- Clarity Act, relating to the secession of a province, introduced in 1999 to the second session of the 36th Parliament
- An Act to amend the Criminal Code (protection of children and other vulnerable persons) and the Canada Evidence Act, introduced in 2002 to the second session of the 37th Canadian Parliament; not passed but subsequently re-introduced
- Fair Representation Act, concerning redistribution, introduced in 2011 to the first session of the 41st Parliament
