= Virgil Exner =

American automobile designer

- Born: Virgil Max Exner Sr. September 24, 1909; Ann Arbor, Michigan, U.S.
- Died: December 22, 1973 (aged 64); Royal Oak, Michigan, U.S.
- Occupations: Automotive designer Chrysler Vice President of Design

Virgil Max "Ex" Exner Sr. (September 24, 1909 – December 22, 1973) was an American automobile designer for several American automobile companies, most notably Chrysler and Studebaker.

Exner is widely known for the "Forward Look" he created for the 1955–1963 Chrysler products and his fondness of tailfins on cars for both aesthetics and aerodynamics.

Prior to the 1955 model year, Chrysler products were considered solid and well-engineered, but with dull styling. But for 1955 and 1956, Chrysler introduced the first set of cars with Exner's stylish and popular Forward Look. These models were very popular and greatly improved Chrysler's image.

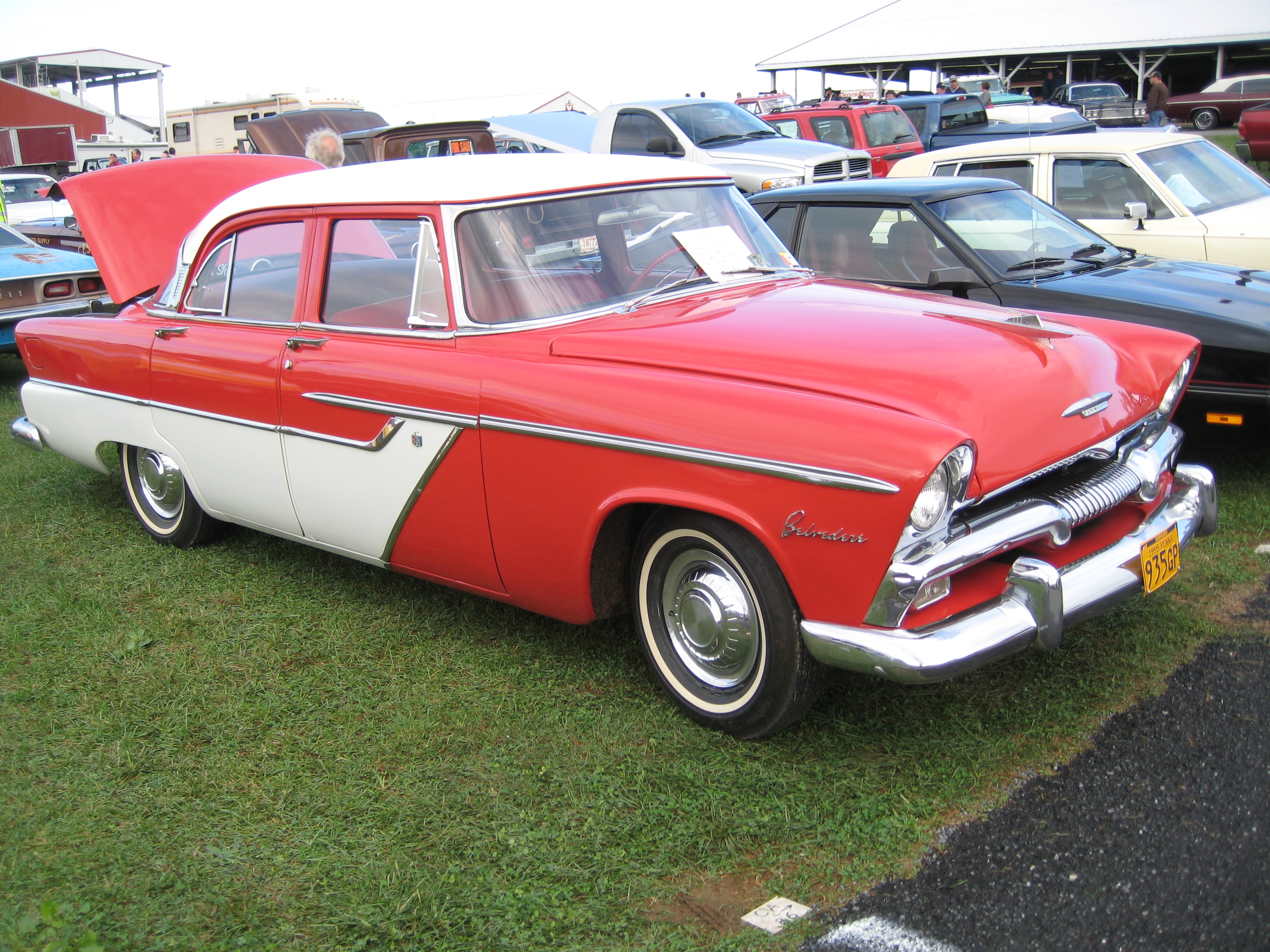
1955 Plymouth Belvedere, featuring the 1955-56 "Forward Look" design.

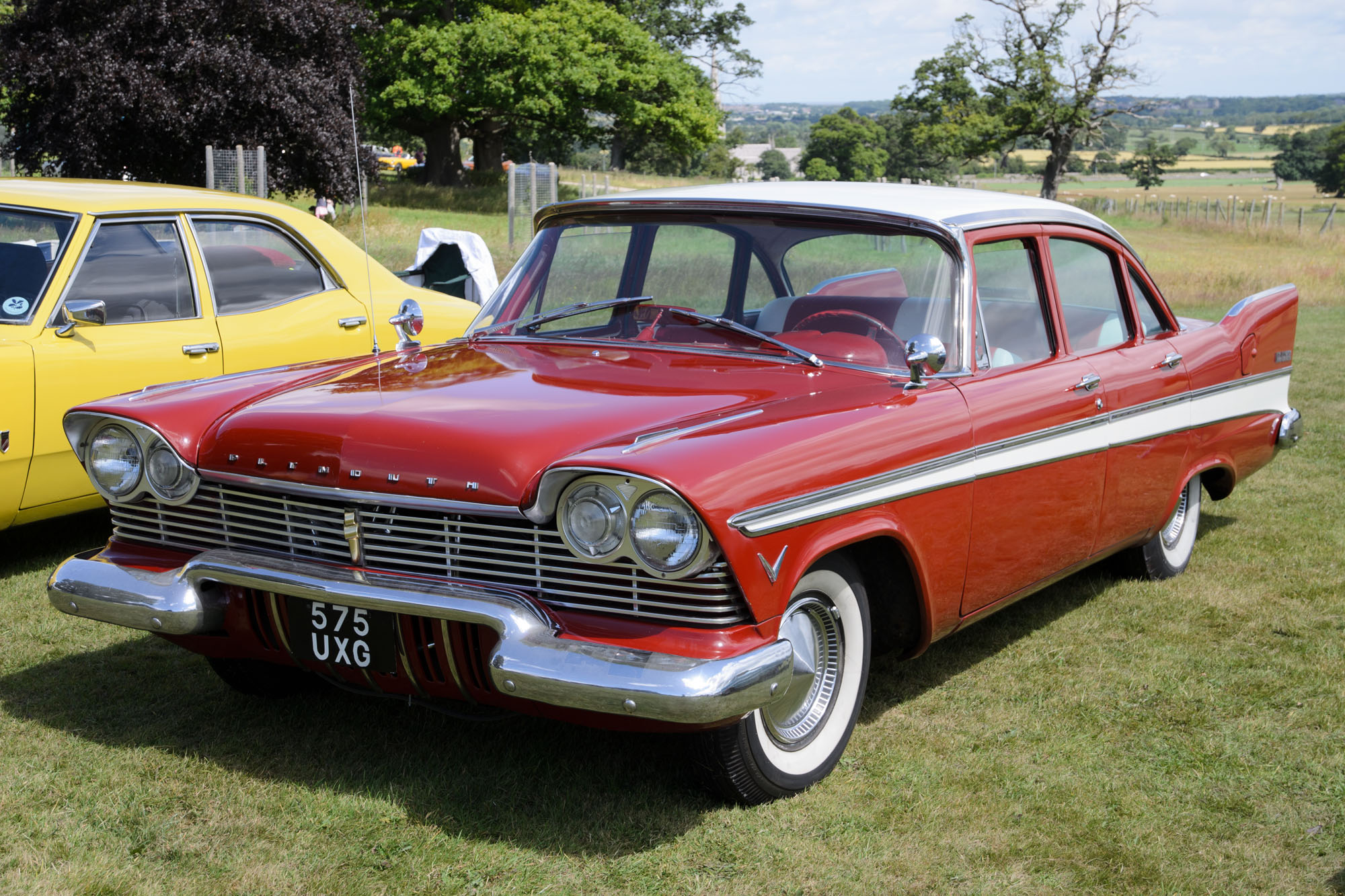
1957 Plymouth Belvedere, featuring the second-generation "Forward Look" design of 1957-59.

For 1957, Chrysler launched all-new models again, introducing cars that were long, low, wide, and featured sweeping tailfins—designs that caused a sensation within the North American auto industry.

When GM designer Chuck Jordan peered through a fence—thanks to a tip he received—and spied Chrysler's soon-to-be-launched 1957 Chrysler lineup, it prompted Bill Mitchell, Jordan's boss at General Motors styling, to convince GM top executives and styling chief Harley Earl to re-open the already-completed designs for the 1959 models and create "an alternate design for each car line, Chevrolet through Cadillac." Exner's work at Chrysler, "including the Forward Look models of the 1950s, would change the course of automotive design".

== Early life ==
Born in Ann Arbor, Michigan, Virgil Exner was adopted by George W. and Iva Exner as a baby. Virgil showed a strong interest in art and automobiles. He went to Buchanan High School in Buchanan, Michigan, then studied art at the University of Notre Dame in Indiana, but dropped out after two years in 1928 due to lack of funds. He then took a job as a helper at an art studio specializing in advertising. In 1931 he married Mildred Marie Eshleman, who also worked for the studio and, on April 17, 1933, they had their first child, Virgil Exner, Jr. By that time, Exner Sr. had been promoted to drawing advertisements for Studebaker trucks. They had a second son in 1940, Brian, who died of injuries after falling from a window. They had their first daughter June 28, 1943, Bronwen Marie Exner. Exner also adopted and raised his niece, Marie Exner, born in 1947, who had become an orphan after her mother Lenor (Milred's sister) died when Marie was a young child.

== Design work ==
=== General Motors ===
His first work in design was for General Motors, where he was hired by GM styling czar Harley Earl. Before age 30, he was in charge of Pontiac styling.

=== Loewy and Associates ===
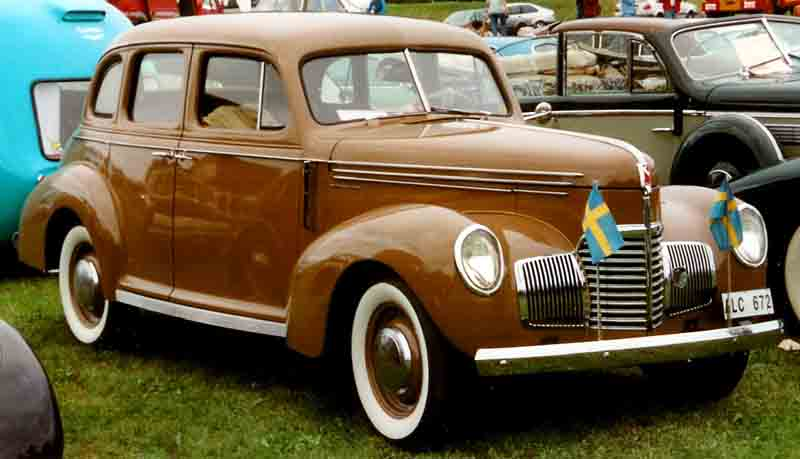
1939 Studebaker Champion G 4-door sedan

In 1938, he joined Raymond Loewy's industrial design firm Loewy and Associates, where he worked on World War II military vehicles and cars, notably Studebaker's 1939–40 models, and advance plans for their revolutionary post-war cars. "But working on Studebaker designs… Exner struggled to get the attention of his boss, who had to sign off on every facet of the designs. Exner was encouraged by Roy Cole, Studebaker's engineering vice president, to work on his own at home on backup designs in case the company's touchy relationship with Loewy blew up".

=== Studebaker Corporation ===
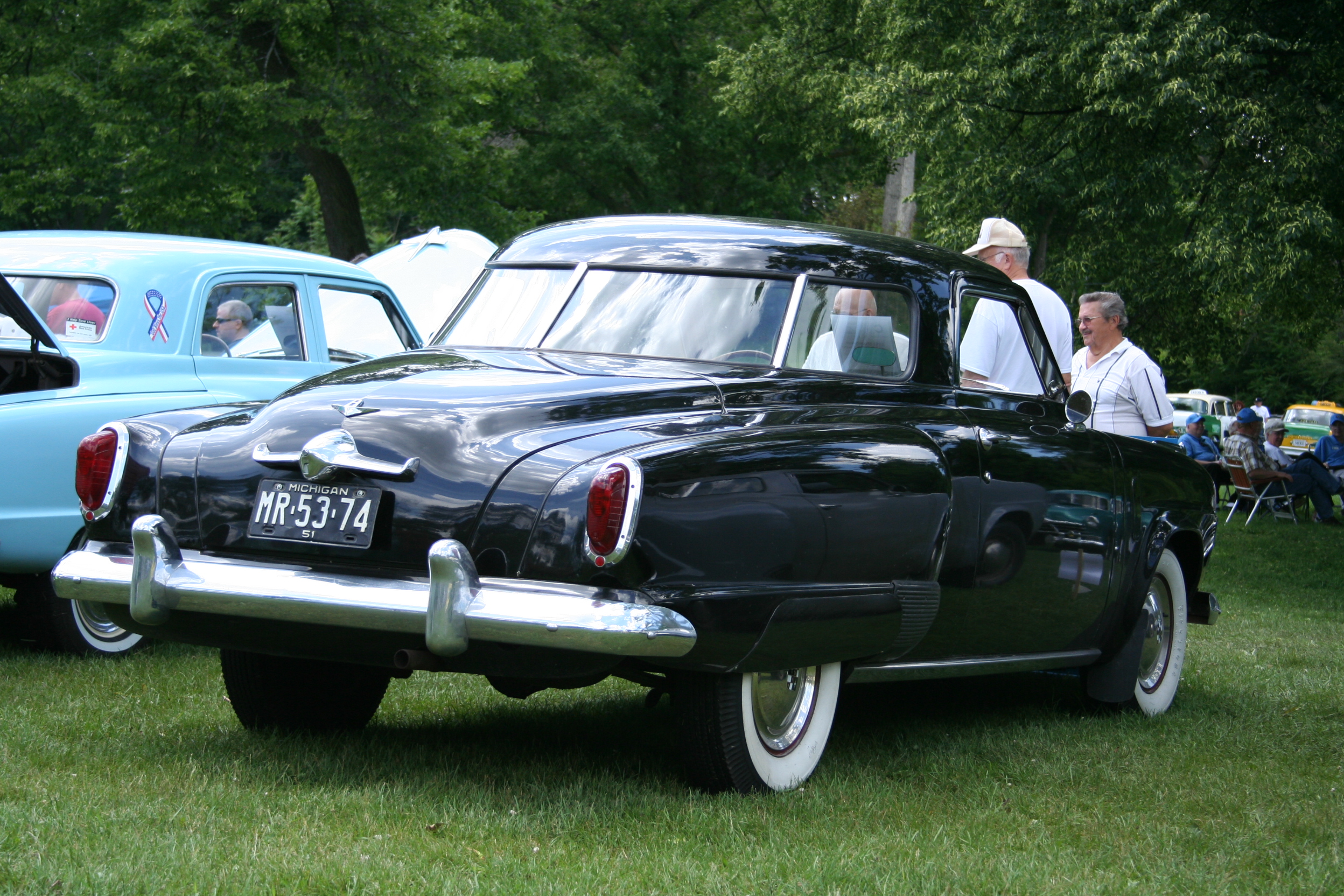
1947 Studebaker Champion Starlight coupé

In 1944, he was fired by Loewy and was hired directly by Studebaker in South Bend, Indiana. There he was involved in the design of some of the first cars with all new styling to be produced after World War II (Studebaker's slogan during this period was "First by far with a post war car"). As acknowledged by Robert Bourke, Virgil was the final designer of the acclaimed 1947 Studebaker Starlight coupe, though Raymond Loewy received the public acknowledgment because his legendary name was a major advertising attraction. Exner is actually listed as the sole inventor on the design patent. Rivalry and bad feeling between the two resulted in Exner having to leave Studebaker, whose engineering chief Roy Cole provided personal introductions for him to Ford and Chrysler.

=== Chrysler Corporation ===
In 1949, Exner started working in Chrysler's Advanced Styling Group, where he partnered with Cliff Voss and Maury Baldwin. He also worked with Luigi "Gigi" Segre, of Italian coach builder Carrozzeria Ghia S.p.A. The men forged a strong personal bond, which helped link the companies closely throughout the 1950s. The alliance produced the Chrysler Ghia designs, such as the 1952 Chrysler K-310, the mid-1950s Dodge Firearrow series show cars, as well as the Chrysler d'Elegance and DeSoto Adventurer.

==== Forward Look design program ====
The Flookerang, the logo for the Chrysler Corporations "Forward Look" design program

When Exner joined Chrysler, the company's vehicles were being fashioned by engineers instead of designers, and so were considered outmoded, unstylish designs.

After seeing the Lockheed P-38 Lightning-inspired tailfins on the 1948 Cadillac, Exner adopted fins as a central element of his vehicle designs. He believed in the aerodynamic benefits of the fins, and even used wind tunnel testing at the University of Michigan—but he also liked their visual effects on the car. Exner lowered the roofline and made the cars sleeker, smoother, and more aggressive looking. In 1955, Chrysler introduced "The New 100-Million Dollar Look". With a long hood and short deck, the wedgelike designs of the Chrysler 300 letter series and revised 1957 models suddenly brought the company to the forefront of design, with Ford and General Motors quickly working to catch up. The 1957 Imperial also featured compound curved glass, the first to be used in a production car. The 1957 Plymouths were advertised with the slogan, "Suddenly, it's 1960!" In June of that year, Exner and his team were awarded a Gold Medal Award by the Industrial Designers Institute (IDI). In 1958, Chrysler's Forward Look was the sponsor of the groundbreaking An Evening with Fred Astaire TV special.

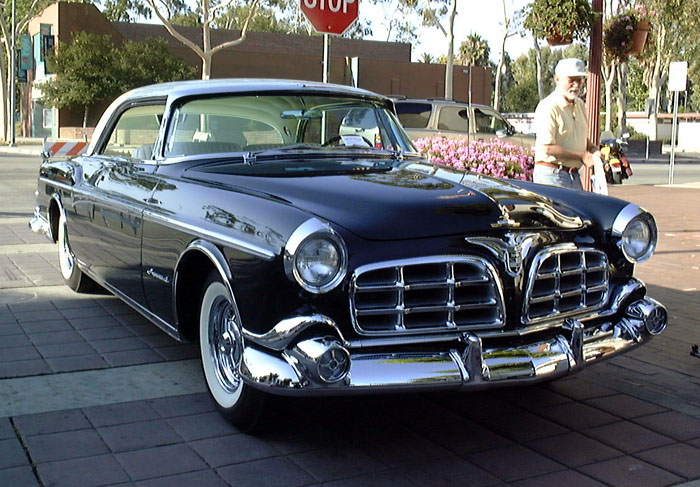
1955 Imperial, one of the first Exner-styled Chrysler vehicles

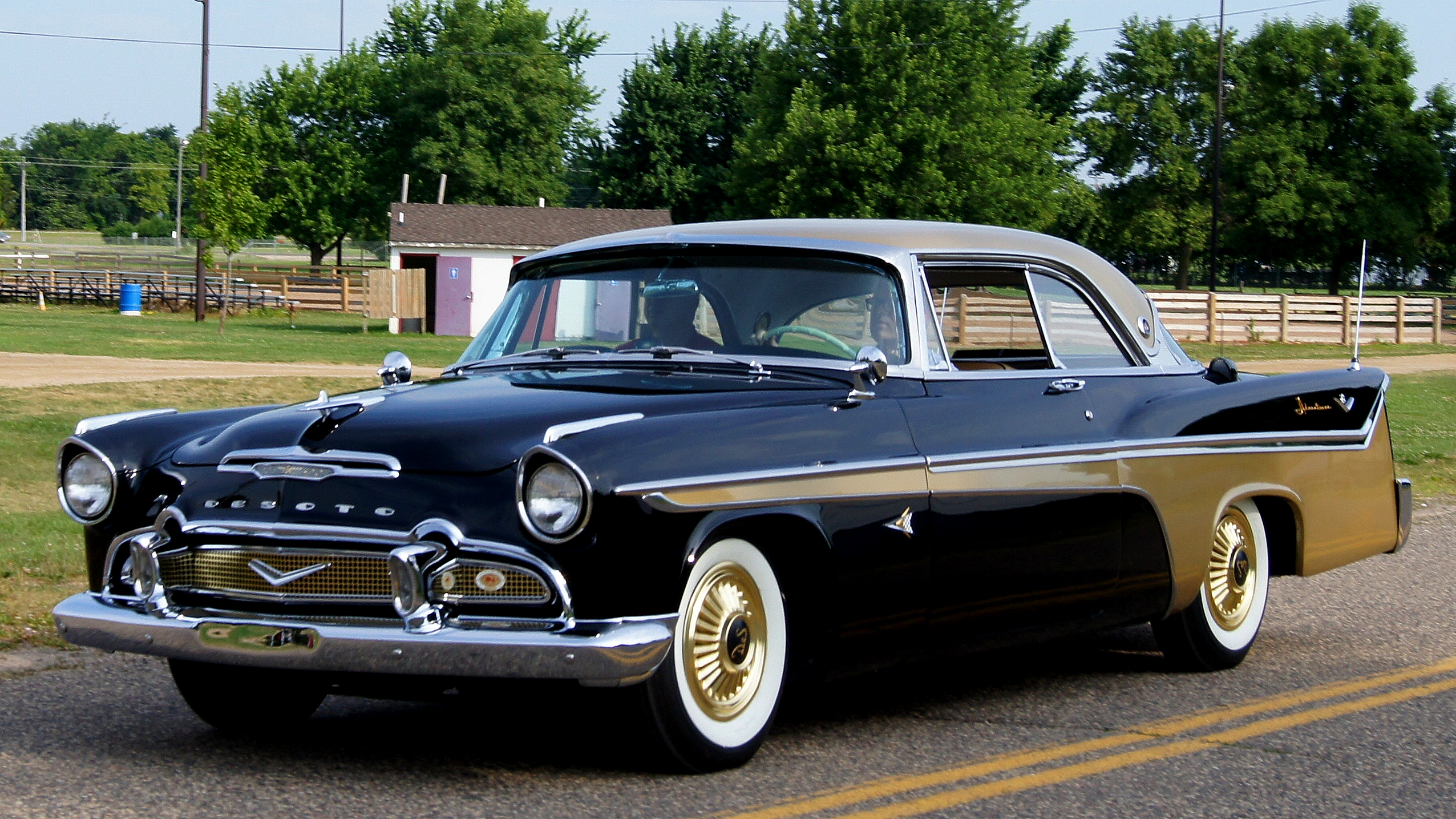
1956 DeSoto Adventurer

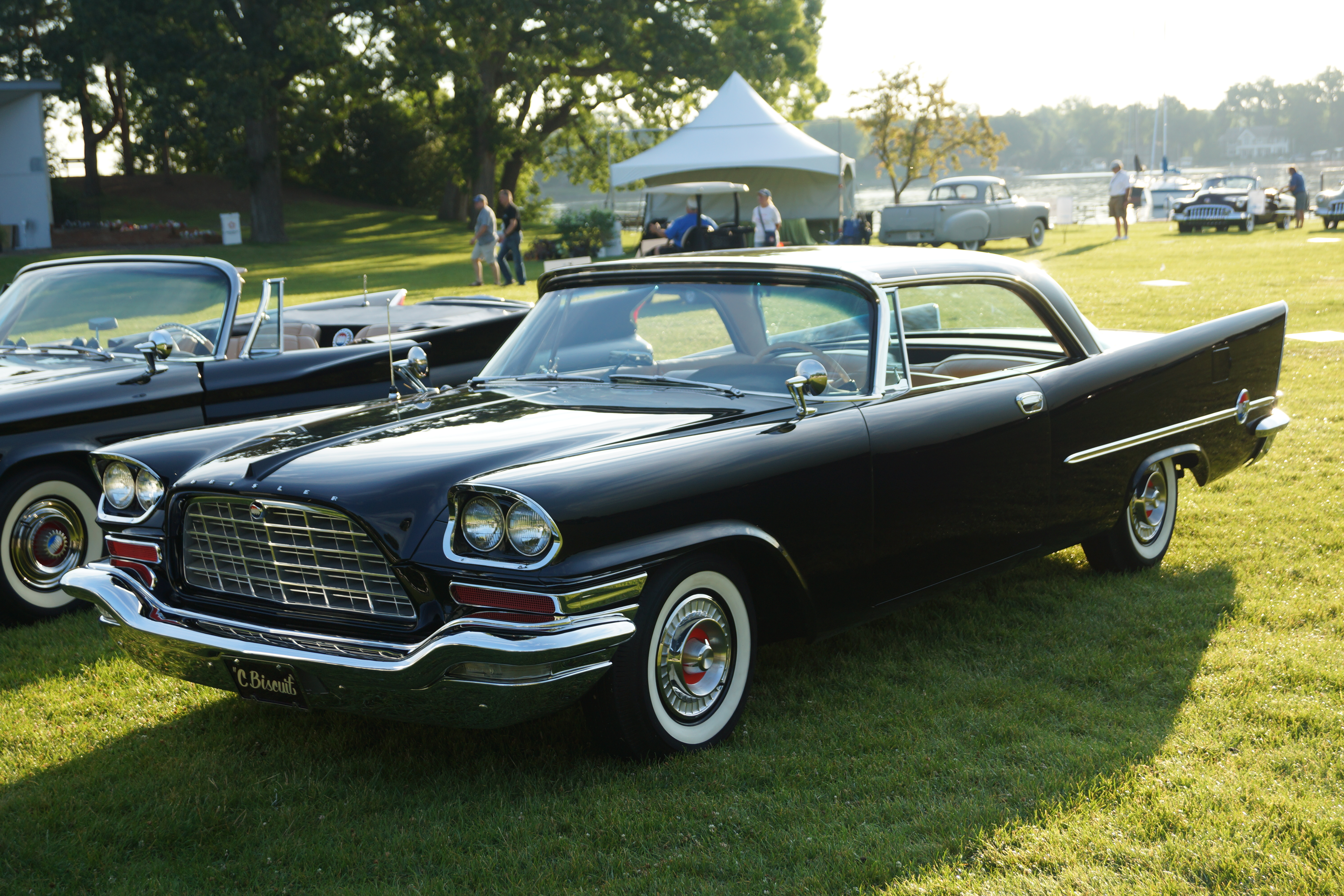
Exner's 1957 Chrysler 300C had a lasting impact on car styling in Detroit

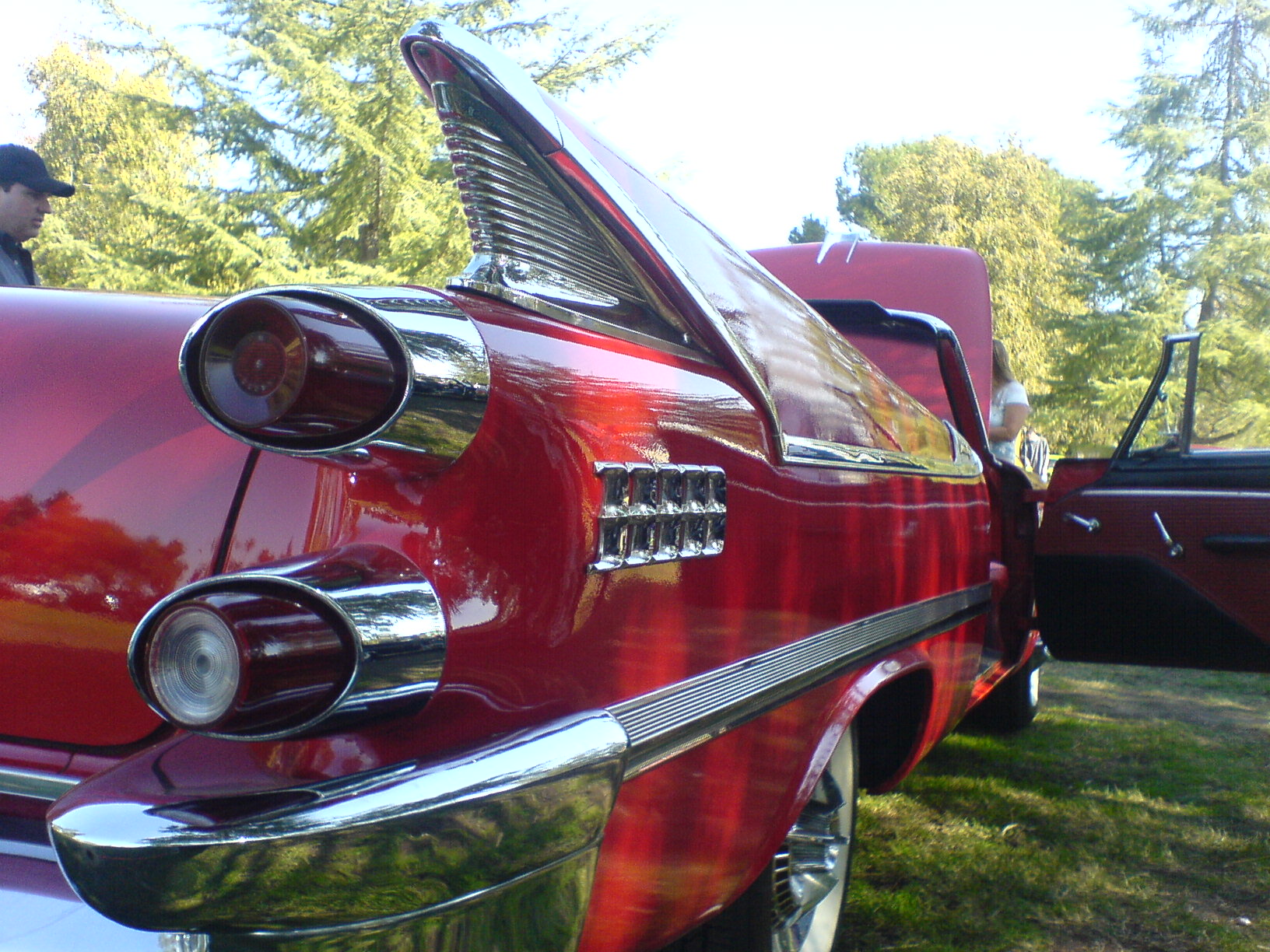
Tail fin of a 1959 Dodge Custom Royal

In 1956, during the design of the 1961 models, Exner suffered a heart attack. He resumed work in 1957, working on the designs for the 1962 cars. On July 25, 1957, Exner was elected the first vice president of styling at Chrysler. Unfortunately, a rumor that GM was reducing the size of their cars caused the president of Chrysler, Lester Lum ("Tex") Colbert, to order Exner to do the same to his 1962 design. This was a change that Exner disagreed with, thinking it would make his cars "ugly". Exner with his associates had completed work on the second full-sized finless Plymouth since 1955, this one for 1962, described as a strikingly attractive automobile. While he was still recovering from the heart attack, the 1962 models Exner took credit for were downsized by associates. This downsizing drastically changed the cars' appearance. This reduced the cars' appeal and caused a significant drop in sales. It turned out that the Chevrolet rumor was false, and consumers disliked the smaller Plymouth and Dodge cars introduced for 1962, the styling of which was bizarre compared to more sedate Ford and GM products. Needing a scapegoat, Chrysler fired Exner. He was allowed to retain a position as a consultant so he could retire with a pension at age 55. He was replaced by Elwood Engel, who had been lured from Ford. Engel was highly regarded for his design of the classic 1961 Lincoln Continental.

Tailfins soon lost popularity. By the late 1950s, Cadillac and Chrysler–driven by the respective competing visions of GM's Earl and Chrysler's Exner–had escalated the size of fins till some thought they were stylistically questionable and they became a symbol of American excess in the early 1960s. The 1961 models are considered the last of the "Forward Look" designs; Exner later referred to the finless 1962 downsized Plymouth and Dodge models as "plucked chickens". He believed Chrysler executives had "picked" away at the cars to make them lower in cost.

Although fins were out of favor by the early 1960s, fins could still give aerodynamic advantages. In the early 1970s, Porsche 917 racing automobiles sported fins reminiscent of Exner's designs.

=== Volkswagen Karmann Ghia ===
Three entities came together in the history of the Volkswagen Karmann Ghia—a design that ultimately reflected strong influence from Virgil Exner. In the early 1950s, Volkswagen was producing its Type 1 (Beetle). As post-war standards of living increased, executives at Volkswagen were at least receptive to adding a halo model to its range, if not proactive. Luigi Segre was committed to expanding the international reputation of Carrozzeria Ghia. And Wilhelm Karmann had taken over his family coachbuilding firm Karmann and was eager to augment his contracts building Volkswagen's convertible models.

As the head of Ghia, Segre singularly directed and incubated the project through conception and prototyping, delivering a feasible project that Willhelm Karmann both wanted to and could practically build—the project Willhelm Karmann would in turn present to Volkswagen. The styling itself, however, integrated work by Segre as well as Mario Boano, Sergio Coggiola, and designer/engineer Giovanni Savonuzzi—and at various times they each took credit for the design. Furthermore, the design bore striking styling similarities to Virgil Exner's Chrysler D'Elegance and K-310 concepts, which Ghia had been tasked with prototyping, and which in turn reflected numerous cues and themes developed previously by Mario Boano. The precise styling responsibilities were never documented before the passing of the designers, further complicated by the overlapping work of the key players. A definitive individual attribution on Karmann Ghias was never made.

Segre and Virgil Exner had become close professionally and personally, eventually traveling Europe together. Peter Grist wrote in a 2007 Exner biography that when Exner in 1955 eventually saw the Karmann Ghia, which cribbed heavily from his Chrysler D'Elegance, "he was pleased with the outcome and glad that one of his designs had made it into large-scale production." Chris Voss, a stylist in Exner's office, reported in 1993, that Exner considered the Karmann Ghia the ultimate form of flattery. Segre in turn sent Exner the first production Karmann Ghia imported into the state of Michigan, in gratitude.

After Volkswagen approved the design in November 1953, the Karmann Ghia debuted at the 1955 Paris Auto show and went into production, first at Ghia and then in Osnabrück — ultimately to reach a production over 445,000, running 19 years virtually unchanged.

== Retirement ==
Exner continued consulting for many car companies from his office in Birmingham, Michigan. He also teamed up with his son, Virgil Exner Jr., designing watercraft for Buehler Corporation. In 1963, he designed a series of "Revival Cars" with production plans. His revival of Duesenberg failed, but he was instrumental in the revival of Stutz in the 1970s.

Seeking to reenter the automotive field, Exner drafted a resume, describing himself as having "extensive, responsible and successful experience in all areas." Exner died of heart failure on December 22, 1973, at the William Beaumont Hospital in Royal Oak, Michigan.

== List of Exner-designed vehicles ==
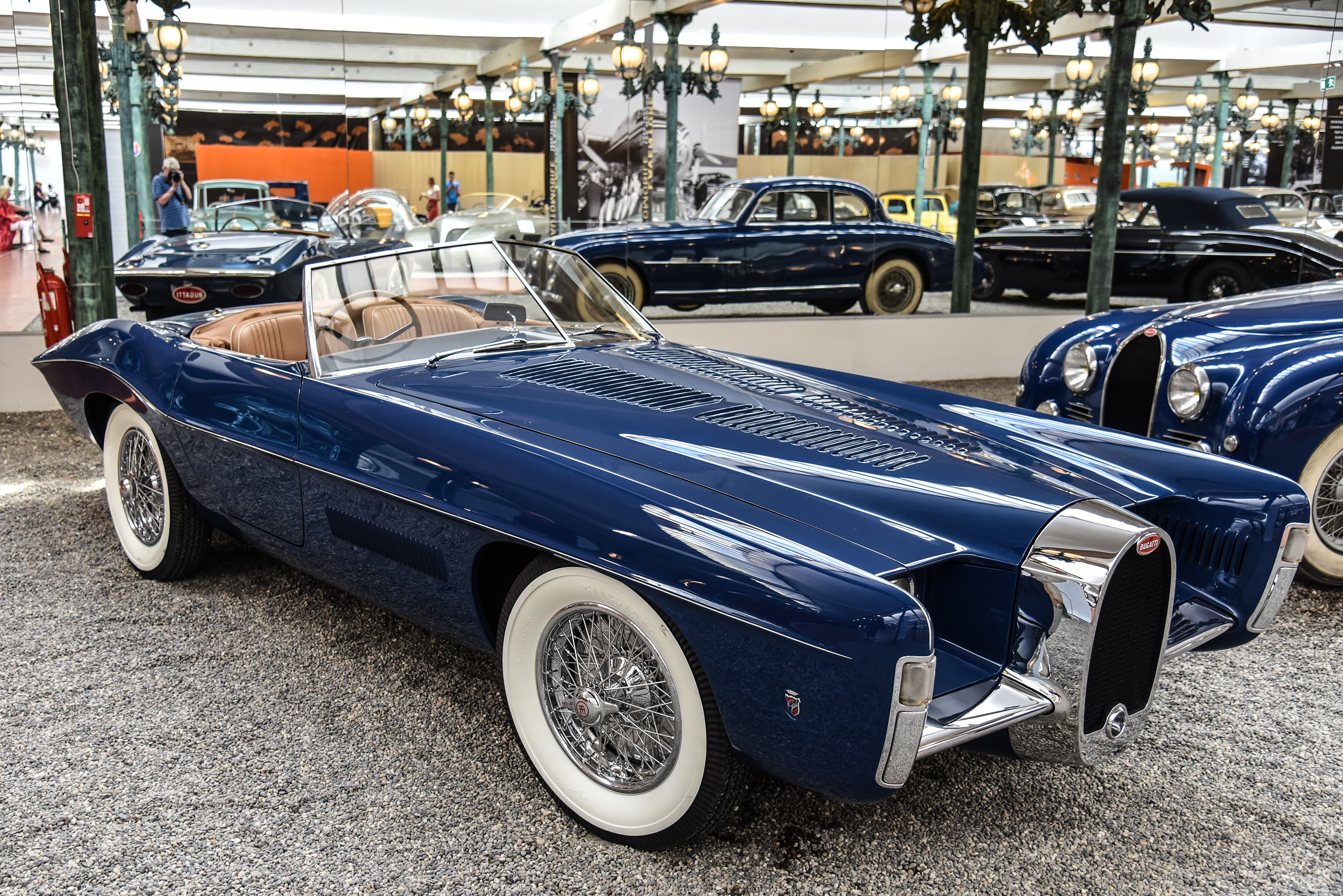
Bugatti Type 101 Virgil Exner/Ghia roadster (chassis # 101506)

- DeSoto (1955–1961)
- Studebaker Champion
- Studebaker Starlight
- Chrysler C-200 concept
- Chrysler d'Elegance concept (1953) (later produced, as the VW Karmann Ghia)
- Chrysler New Yorker (1957)
- Chrysler 300 letter series
- Chrysler 300 non-letter series
- Imperial (1955–1961)
- Chrysler Diablo concept (1957) with Ghia
- Plymouth Savoy
- Plymouth XNR
- Plymouth Belvedere
- Plymouth Fury
- Plymouth Suburban
- Plymouth Valiant
- Dodge Coronet
- Dodge Firearrow series
- DeSoto 1961
- DeSoto Adventurer
- Bugatti Type 101 1965 concept with Ghia
- Mercer-Cobra 1965 concept
- Duesenberg 1966 prototype with Ghia
- Stutz Blackhawk

== Notes ==
=== Bibliography ===
- Grist, Peter (2007). Virgil Exner: Visioneer. Veloce Publishing. ISBN 978-1-84584-118-8.
