= List of Chrysler platforms =

== Rear wheel drive cars ==
Platform	Years	Vehicle Type	Imperial	Chrysler	Dodge	Plymouth
D	1957–1966	full-size car	Imperial	-	-	-
A	1960–1976	compact car	-	-	Dart; Lancer	Barracuda; Duster; Valiant
B	1962–1979	mid-size car	-	Cordoba	330/440; Charger; Coronet; Dart; Magnum; Monaco; Polara	Belvedere; Fury; GTX; Road Runner; Satellite; Savoy
C	1965–1978	full-size car	Imperial	300; New Yorker; Newport; Town and Country	Monaco; Polara; Custom 880	Fury; Gran Fury
E	1970–1974	coupe	-	-	Challenger	Barracuda
F	1976–1980	compact car	-	-	Aspen	Volare
M	1977–1989	mid-size car	-	LeBaron; Fifth Avenue; New Yorker; Town and Country	Diplomat	Gran Fury
R	1979–1981	full-size car	-	Newport; New Yorker	St. Regis	Gran Fury
J	1980–1983	coupe	Imperial	Cordoba	Mirada	-
SR	1992–2002	sports car	-	-	Viper	-
PR	1997–2002	sports car	-	Prowler	-	Prowler
ZB	2003–2010	sports car	-	-	Viper	-
ZH	2004–2008	sports car	-	Crossfire	-	-
LX	2005–2010	full-size car	-	300	Magnum; Charger	-
LC	2008–2014	sports car	-	-	Challenger	-
LD	2011–2023	full-size car	-	300	Charger	-
ZD	2013–2017	sports car	-	-	Viper	-
LA	2015–2023	sports car	-	-	Challenger	-

== Front wheel drive cars ==
Platform	Years	Vehicle Type	Chrysler	Dodge	Plymouth	Eagle	Jeep
L	1978–1990	subcompact car	-	Omni; 024; Charger; Rampage	Horizon; TC3; Turismo; Scamp	-	-
K	1981–1989	mid-size car	LeBaron; Town and Country; Executive	Aries; 400	Reliant	-	-
E	1983–1988	mid-size car	New Yorker; E-Class	600	Caravelle	-	-
S	1984–1990	minivan	Town and Country	Caravan	Voyager	-	-
G	1984–1993	sports car	Laser	Daytona	-	-	-
H	1985–1989	mid-size car	LeBaron GTS; Chrysler GTS	Lancer	-	-	-
P	1987–1994	compact car	Chrysler ES	Shadow	Sundance	-	-
J	1987–1995	coupe	LeBaron; Phantom	-	-	-	-
B	1988–1992	mid-size car	-	Monaco	-	Premier	-
C	1988–1993	mid-size car	New Yorker	Dynasty	-	-	-
Q	1989–1991	convertible	TC by Maserati	-	-	-	-
AA	1989–1995	mid-size car	LeBaron; Saratoga; Spirit	Spirit	Acclaim	-	-
Y	1990–1993	full-size car	New Yorker Fifth Avenue; Imperial	-	-	-	-
D	1990–1994	sport compact car	-	-	Laser	Talon	-
AS	1991–1995	minivan	Town and Country	Caravan	Voyager	-	-
LH	1993–2004	full-size car	New Yorker; Concorde; LHS; 300M	Intrepid	-	Vision	-
PL	1995–2005	compact car	-	Neon	Neon	-	-
PJ	1995–1998	sport compact car	-	-	-	Talon	-
JA	1995–2000	mid-size car	Cirrus	Stratus	Breeze	-	-
FJ	1995–2000	coupe	Sebring Coupe	Avenger	-	-	-
JX	1996–2000	convertible	Sebring Convertible	-	-	-	-
NS	1996–2000	minivan	Town and Country; Voyager	Caravan	Voyager	-	-
ST	2001–2005	coupe	Sebring Coupe	Stratus Coupe	-	-	-
JR	2001–2006	mid-size car convertible	Sebring Convertible; Sebring Sedan	Stratus	-	-	-
RS	2001–2007	minivan	Town & Country; Voyager	Caravan	-	-	-
PT	2001–2010	compact car	PT Cruiser	-	-	-	-
CS	2004–2008	crossover SUV	Pacifica	-	-	-	-
JS	2007–2014	mid-size car convertible	Sebring Convertible; Sebring Sedan; 200	Avenger		-	-
PM/MK	2007–2017	compact car	-	Caliber	-	-	Patriot; Compass
RT	2008–2020	minivan	Town and Country; Voyager	Grand Caravan	-	-	-
JC	2009–2020	crossover SUV	-	Journey	-	-	-
PF	2013–2016	compact car	-	Dart	-	-	-
KL	2014–2023	compact SUV	-	-	-	-	Cherokee
UF	2015–2017	midsize car	200	-	-	-	-
BU	2015–present	subcompact SUV	-	-	-	-	Renegade
MP	2017–present	compact SUV	-	-	-	-	Compass
RU	2017–present	minivan	Pacifica	-	-	-	-

== Trucks ==
Platform	Years	Dodge	Plymouth	Chrysler	Jeep
AB	1971–2003	Sportsman; Tradesman; Ram Van; Ram Wagon	Voyager	-	
AD	1972–1993	D-Series; Ramcharger; Ram	Trail Duster	-	
AN	1987–2004	Dakota	-	-	
BE/BR	1994–2001	Ram	-	-	
DN	1998–2003	Durango	-	-	
DR/DH/DC/DM/D1	2002–2008	Ram	-	-	
ND	2005–2011	Dakota	-	-	
HB/HG	2002–2009	Durango	-	Aspen	
DS	2009–2024	Ram	-		
DT	2019–present	Ram	-		
WS	2022–present				Wagoneer/ Grand Wagoneer
