= Chrysler Cirrus =

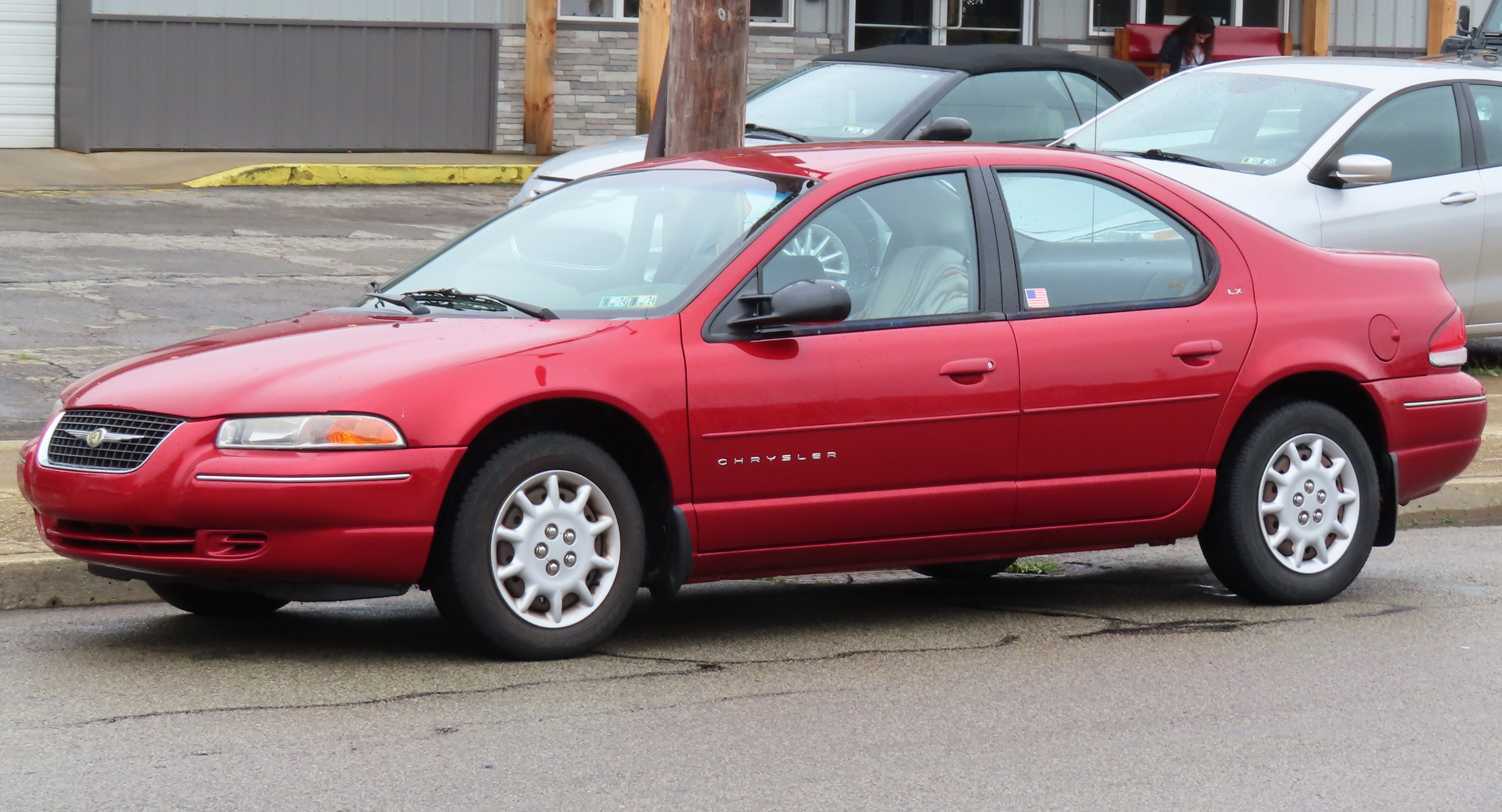

Overview
- Manufacturer: Chrysler Corporation (1995–1998); DaimlerChrysler (1998–2000)
- Also called: Chrysler Stratus; Plymouth Breeze; Dodge Stratus (1st. Generation)
- Production: June 1994–2000
- Model years: 1995–2000 (Cirrus & Stratus); 1996–2000 (Breeze)
- Assembly: United States: Sterling Heights, Michigan (Sterling Heights Assembly)
- Designer: Michael Santoro (1991)

Body and chassis
- Class: Mid-size car
- Body style: 4-door notchback sedan
- Layout: Transverse front-engine, front-wheel drive
- Platform: Chrysler JA platform
- Related: Chrysler Sebring convertible

Powertrain
- Engine: 2.0 L A588 I4 (gasoline) (Breeze & Stratus only); 2.4 L EDZ/EY7 I4 (gasoline); 2.4 L EDV/EDT I4 (turbocharged gasoline); 2.5 L 6G73 V6 (gasoline)
- Transmission: 4-speed Ultradrive 41TE automatic; 5-speed NV T350 manual (Breeze & Stratus only)

Dimensions
- Wheelbase: 108 in (2,743 mm)
- Length: 186.0–186.7 in (4,724–4,742 mm)
- Width: 71.0–71.7 in (1,803–1,821 mm)
- Height: 54.1–54.4 in (1,374–1,382 mm)
- Curb weight: 2,911–3,181 lb (1,320–1,443 kg)

Chronology
- Predecessor: Chrysler LeBaron (Cirrus); Plymouth Acclaim (Breeze); Dodge Spirit & Dodge Dynasty (Stratus); Eagle 2000GTX
- Successor: Chrysler Sebring (Cirrus); Dodge Stratus (Stratus & Breeze)

2.0 L engine sound

The Chrysler Cirrus is a mid-sized 4-door notchback sedan introduced by Chrysler motors for the 1995 model year. Built on the Chrysler JA platform, the 4-door notchback sedan joined Chrysler's roster of "Cloud Car" models drawing their names from meteorological terms, including the mid-priced Dodge Stratus it was based on introduced at the same time, and the low-priced Plymouth Breeze variant a year later.

== Design ==
Development of the Cirrus started in 1991, with the goal of creating an affordable, expressive-looking, fun-to-drive vehicle that was still safe enough to transport an everyday family.

The concept car designed for the 1992 auto show circuit featured rear suicide doors and a 400 hp (298 kW; 406 PS) turbocharged 3.0 L two-stroke engine using alcohol fuel. The concept also foreshadowed a hood-line with almost no break with the windshield to improve aerodynamics.

Both the concept and production model used the Chrysler Corporation's new cab-forward design, which was launched on the larger LH sedans in 1992. This three-box design was characterized by a large passenger cabin in proportion to a comparatively short hood and trunk, highlighted by a long, dramatically slanted windshield and short overhangs. Pushing the wheels further to the corners of the body created a much larger cabin than most other similarly sized vehicles of that time.

The four-door notchback sedan was designed with flowing lines with no distinct beginning or end, but almost resembled a two-box fastback. Design work was done during 1991, with the final version moved on for production by 1992.

== Features ==
The Cirrus was introduced for 1995 as a replacement for the Chrysler LeBaron sedan. It was often compared to other smaller mid-size cars such as the Chevrolet Malibu, yet judged roomier than the Ford Contour by many magazines such as Consumer Reports. The exteriors of the Chrysler Cirrus, Dodge Stratus, and Plymouth Breeze were very similar, with the front fascia, rear bumper, taillights, and wheels being the main differences. The interiors had little variation between the three models; being almost identical, save for the name on the steering wheel, and a few available options. The fascias of each JA car corresponds with each brand's minivan offering, sharing headlights, and grille designs.

All three variants of the platform were available with most of the same standard features: four-wheel independent suspension (double wishbone in the front with a multilink rear), air conditioning, tilt steering wheel, and driver and front-passenger air bags and available options, such as the following: an optional four-speed automatic transmission (Autostick was not available on the Breeze), anti-lock brakes, cruise control, power windows, power door locks, power mirrors, sunroof. A five-speed manual was standard with the 2.0 L. The 2.4 L was not offered in a manual because of its high torque and difficult drivability issues, mainly due to excessive wheel spinning at speeds over 100 mph.

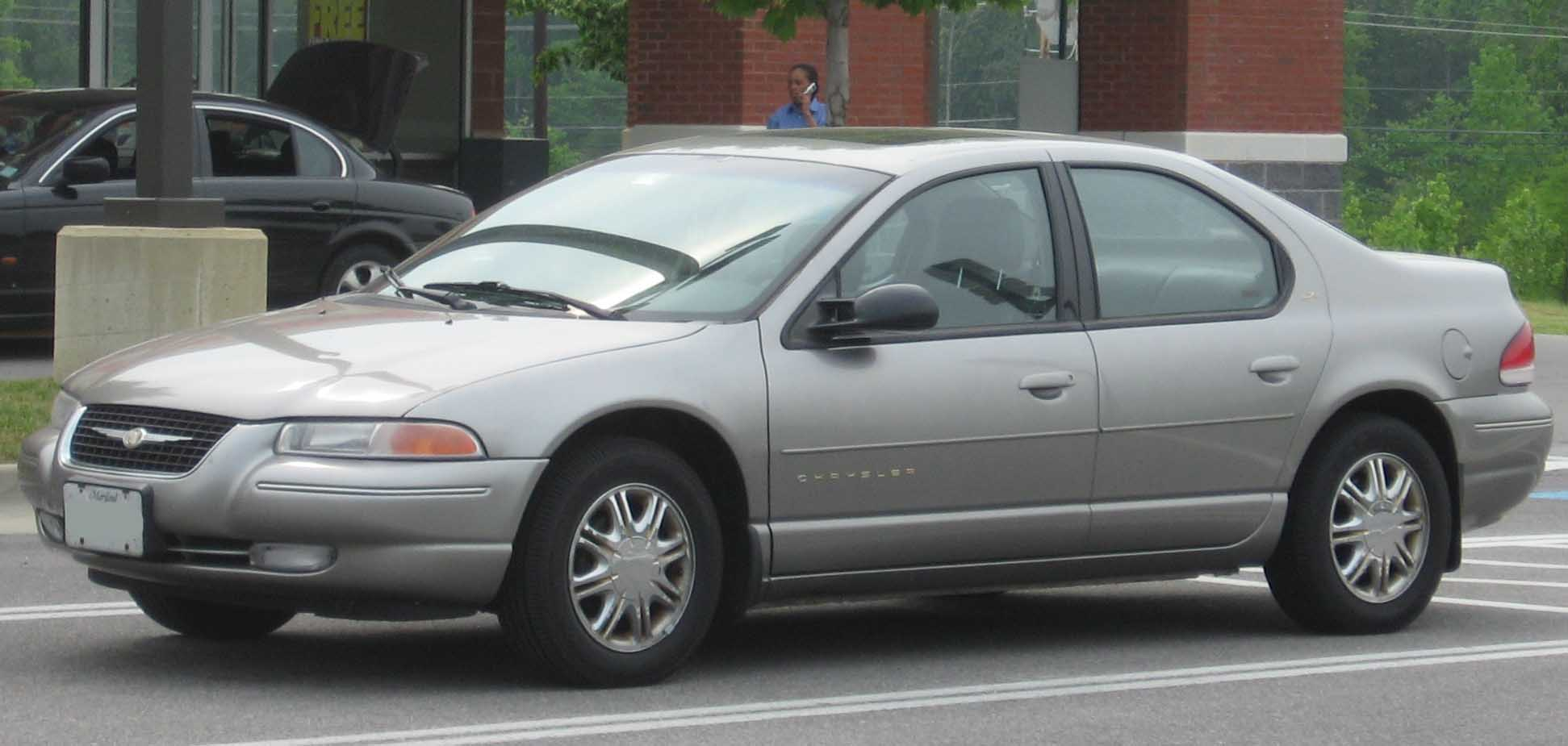
1999 or 2000 Chrysler Cirrus LXi

The Cirrus was originally available in two trim levels: the well-equipped base LX and the luxury LXi. Both models featured sporty, black twin-post side mirrors, fog lights, the same body side moldings, chrome bumper accents, an automatic transmission and a low extending waterfall grille that was either chrome or body-colored depending on the color of the vehicle. The Cirrus was one of the first Chrysler vehicles to feature the rose medallion logo, which had not been used in 41 years. From 1995 to 1997, the Cirrus was offered in two trim levels: the entry-level LX and the luxury LXi. The LX model was dropped for the 1998 model year, but returned in 2000 to compensate for the Plymouth Breeze that was discontinued early in the 2000 model year. It was replaced by the 2001 Dodge Stratus sedan.

The Cirrus was used as a patrol cruiser by the Macedonian police from 2000 to the 2010s.

=== Trim levels ===
The LX (1995–1997; 2000) was the base Chrysler Cirrus trim level. It included the following standard equipment: a 2.4 L I4 engine, a four-speed automatic transmission, black steel wheels with plastic wheel covers, an AM/FM stereo with cassette player and six speakers, air conditioning, full instrumentation, power windows and door locks, exterior color-keyed side mirrors and door handles, and premium cloth seats.

The LXi (1995–2000) was the top-of-the-line Chrysler Cirrus trim level. It added the following equipment to the LX trim level: alloy wheels, a premium AM/FM stereo with cassette player and integrated CD changer controls, keyless entry, chrome accents, a premium front grille, and wood grain interior trim.

=== Engines ===
- 2.4 L I4
- 2.5 L V6

=== Model year changes ===
- 1995: The all-new Chrysler Cirrus sedan is launched in the United States and Canada in late 1994.
- 1996: Rear headrests were added.
- 1997: The 4-cylinder engine was made standard in both models, with the V6 as an option. The interior gained a new center console with a storage compartment and integrated armrest.
- 1998: The 4-cylinder engine and the LX trim level were eliminated, leaving only V6 LXi models.
- 1999: For its fifth model year, the Cirrus received a redesigned open grille with Chrysler's new winged grille badge. Chrysler's Sentry Key system was a new option. Sentry Key disabled the ignition unless the proper key was inserted. Standard 15-inch (380 mm) wheel covers could be upgraded to new 15-inch (380 mm) alloy wheels. Cirrus was the only one of the JA "cloud cars" to receive any form of a facelift over the course of its production.
- 2000: For its final model year, the 4-cylinder LX model returned to join the V6-powered LXi sedan. Previously optional rear child seat anchorages, aluminum wheels, and an 8-speaker AM/FM radio stereo were now listed as standard features.

== Plymouth Breeze ==
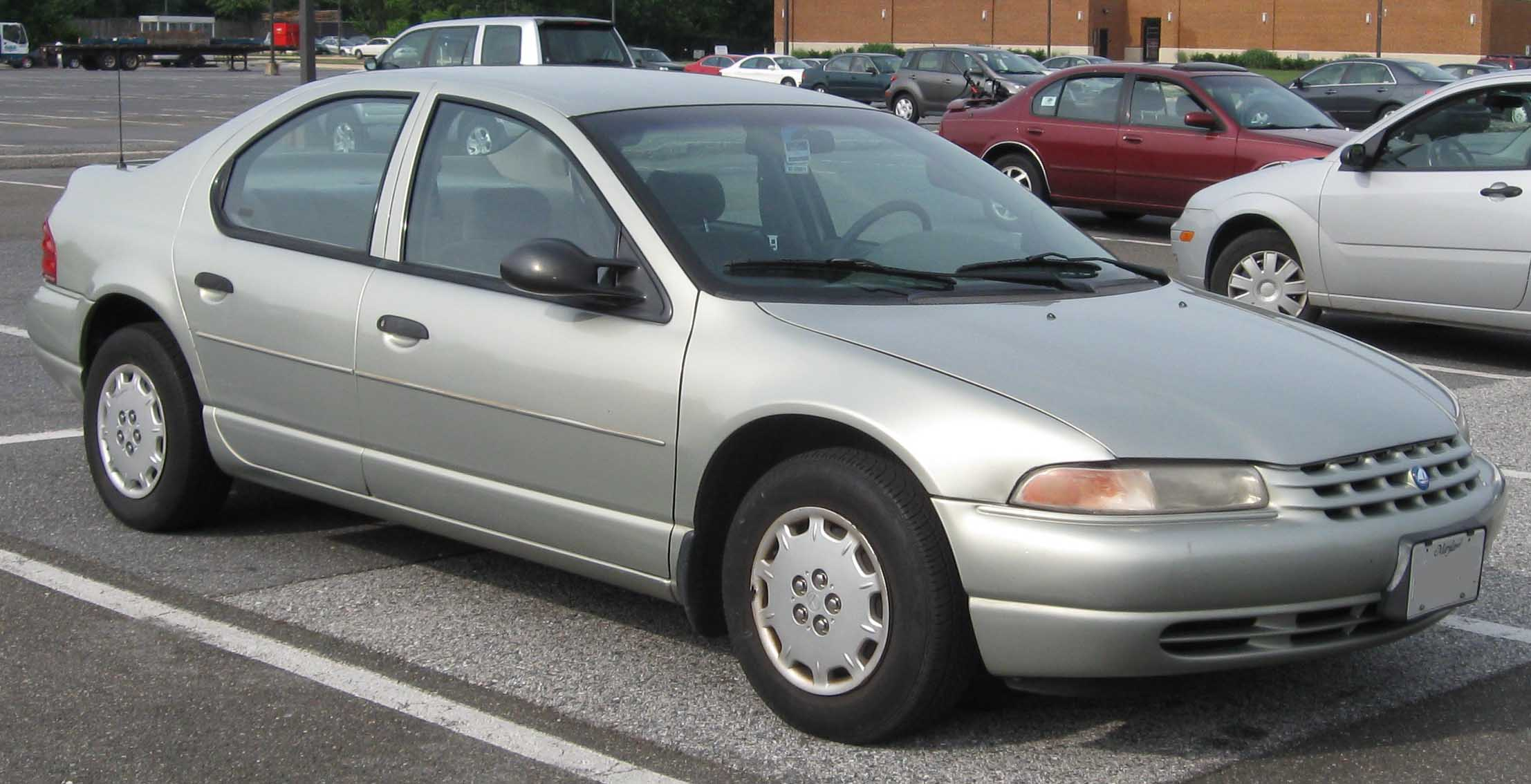
1996 Plymouth Breeze

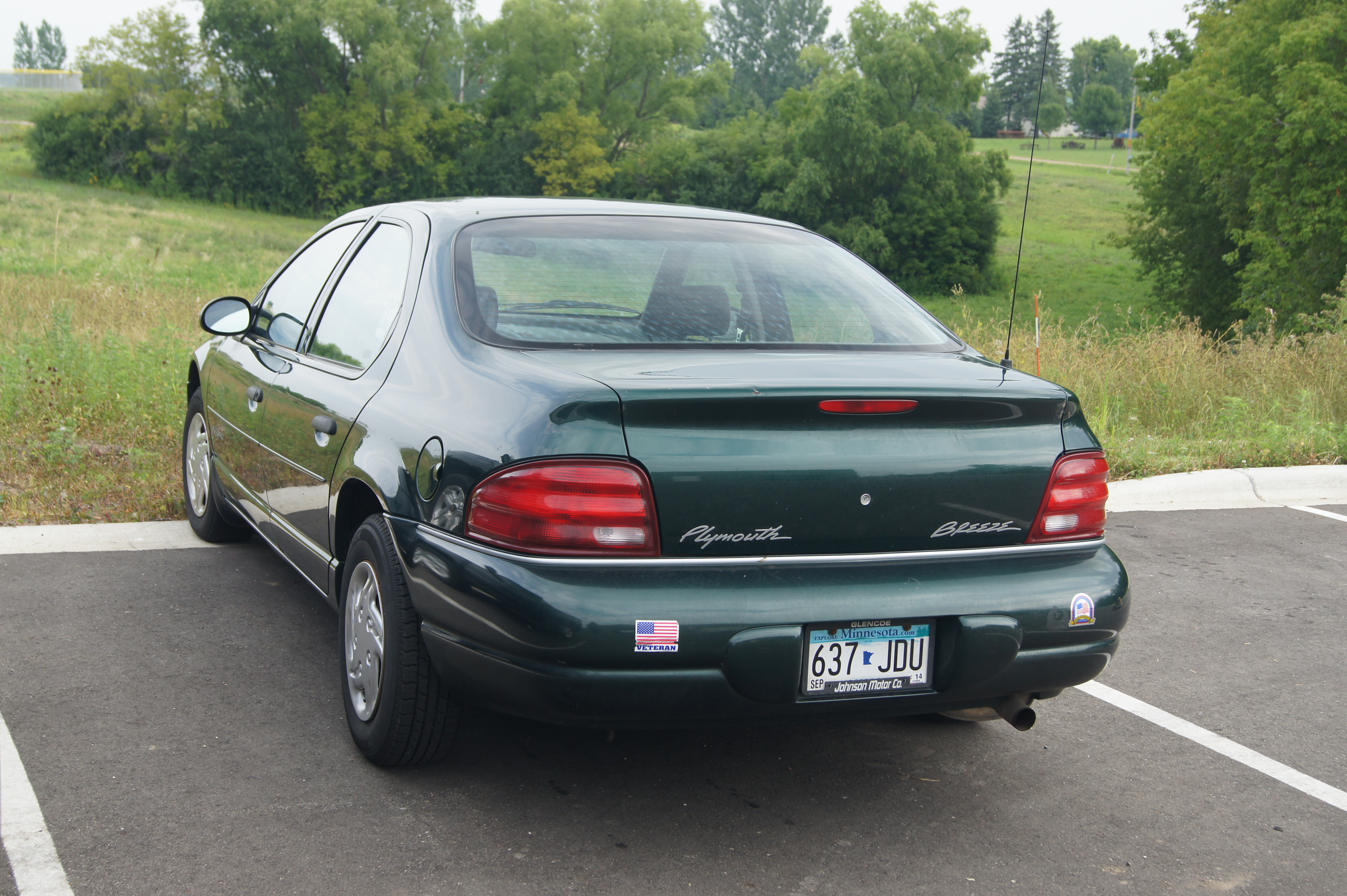
Plymouth Breeze Rear View

The Plymouth Breeze was released in 1995 as a 1996 model. Although it did not match the sales of its predecessor, the Acclaim, the Breeze did manage to sell over 230,000 units and total production was greater than that of its Chrysler Cirrus sibling, which was produced for nearly two additional years.

As part of Chrysler's new marketing strategy which addressed concerns that its brands were treading into each other's marketing territory, Plymouth, as Chrysler Corporation's low-price brand for essentially its entire existence, was to focus exclusively on value. As a result, the Breeze (as well as the base model Stratus) filled the position as the entry-level JA car. Due to this, the Breeze lacked certain features including an available V6 engine, alloy wheels, leather interior, body-colored door handles, fog lights, and Chrysler's Autostick transmission, all of which were offered on the Stratus and Cirrus.

The Plymouth Breeze came only as one basic model. Equipped similarly to a base model Dodge Stratus, the Breeze came standard with the 2.0 L I4 engine, five-speed manual transmission, 14-inch wheel covers, air conditioning, tilt steering wheel, AM/FM stereo, and driver and front-passenger airbags. The Breeze was also available with many options including a four-speed automatic transmission, 2.4 L I4 engine (available with automatic transmission only), anti-lock brakes, cruise control, power windows, power door locks, power mirrors, cassette or CD player, and a power sunroof. Additionally, 1998 and 1999 Breezes offered an "Expresso Package" similar to the one available on the Voyager and Neon. "Expresso" content included special badging, unique wheel covers, upgraded audio system, and premium interior cloth in unique "Rhythm" pattern. The Breeze was discontinued early in the 2000 model year, as part of Chrysler's phaseout of the Plymouth brand; the last Breeze rolled off the Sterling Heights Assembly line on January 7, 2000.

=== Trim levels ===
The Base (1996–2000) was the least-expensive trim level of the Plymouth Breeze from 1996 to 1999, and the only available trim level for the Breeze's final year of production in 2000. The Base included the following standard equipment: a 2.0 L I4 engine, a five-speed manual transmission, fourteen-inch black steel wheels with plastic wheel covers, an A/M-F/M stereo with six speakers, full instrumentation, air conditioning, cloth seats, and manual windows and door locks.

The Expresso (1998–1999) was the top-of-the-line trim level of the Plymouth Breeze, but was discontinued after 1999. The Expresso added the following equipment to the Base trim level: power windows and door locks, an A/M-F/M stereo with cassette player and six speakers, premium cloth seats, exterior color-keyed side mirrors and door handles, and a 2.4 L I4 engine with a four-speed automatic transmission. An "Expresso" decal adorned both front doors, as well as the rear trunk lid.

=== Engines ===
Engines	Displacement	Power at rpm	Torque at rpm	Years
2.0	1,996 cm^{3} (121.8 cu in)	132 hp (98 kW) at 6000	129 lb⋅ft (175 N⋅m) at 5000	1996 - 2000
2.4	2,429 cm^{3} (148.2 cu in)	150 hp (112 kW) at 5200	167 lb⋅ft (226 N⋅m) at 4000	1997 - 2000

=== 1996 ===
- Plymouth Breeze sedan is released to replace the Plymouth Acclaim.
- New window tints.
- During mid-96 a sunroof is added as an option.

=== 1997 ===
- A new center console which included storage space, an integrated armrest, and rear-seat cupholders.

=== 1998 ===
- The 2.4 L I4 is added as an option, and the Expresso trim level.

=== 1999 ===
- Revised suspension tuning for a smoother ride.

=== 2000 ===
- Breeze production was halted early in 2000, due to the phaseout of the Plymouth brand name.
- Only the base model Breeze was available.

== Dodge Stratus ==
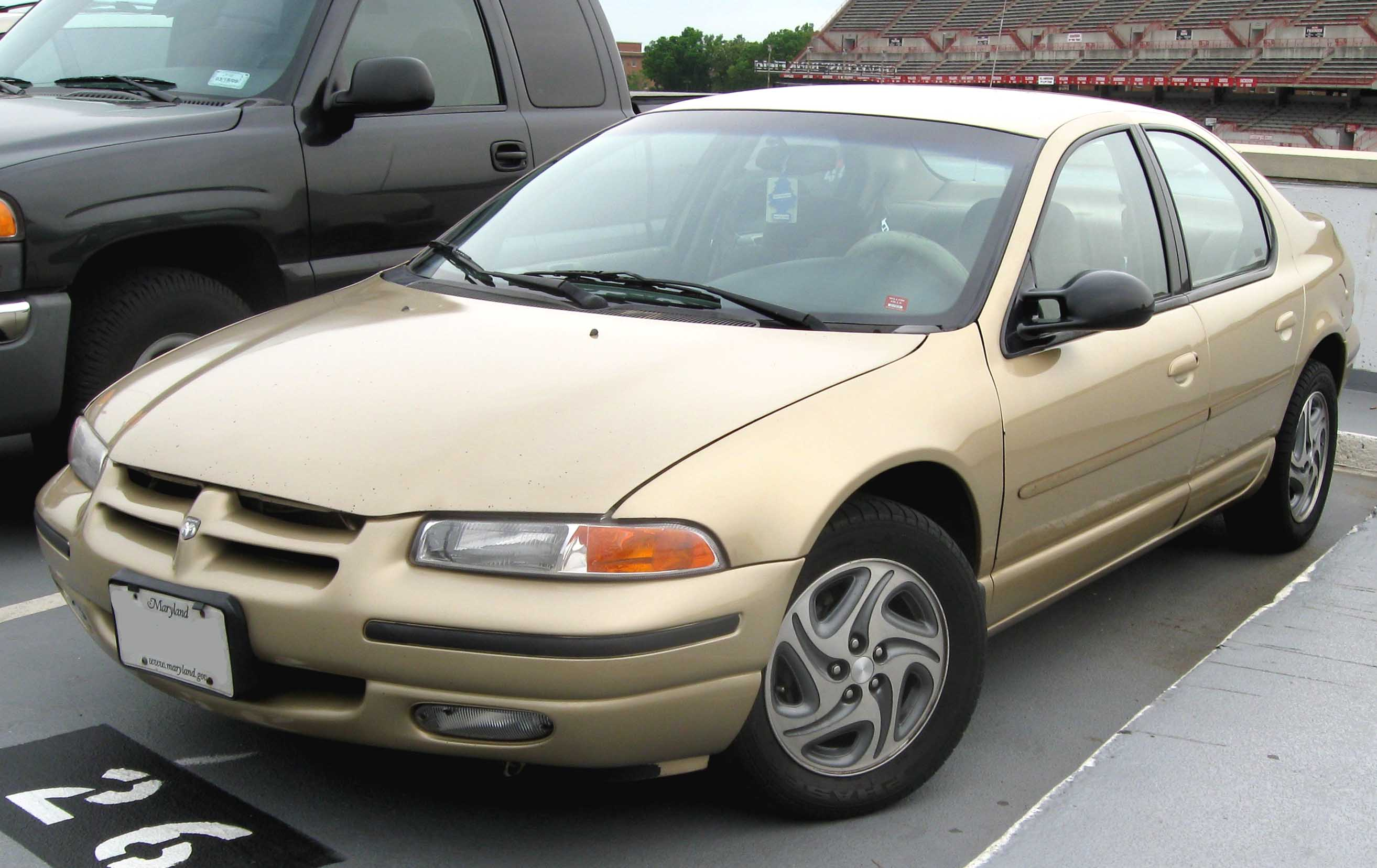
1996 Dodge Stratus ES

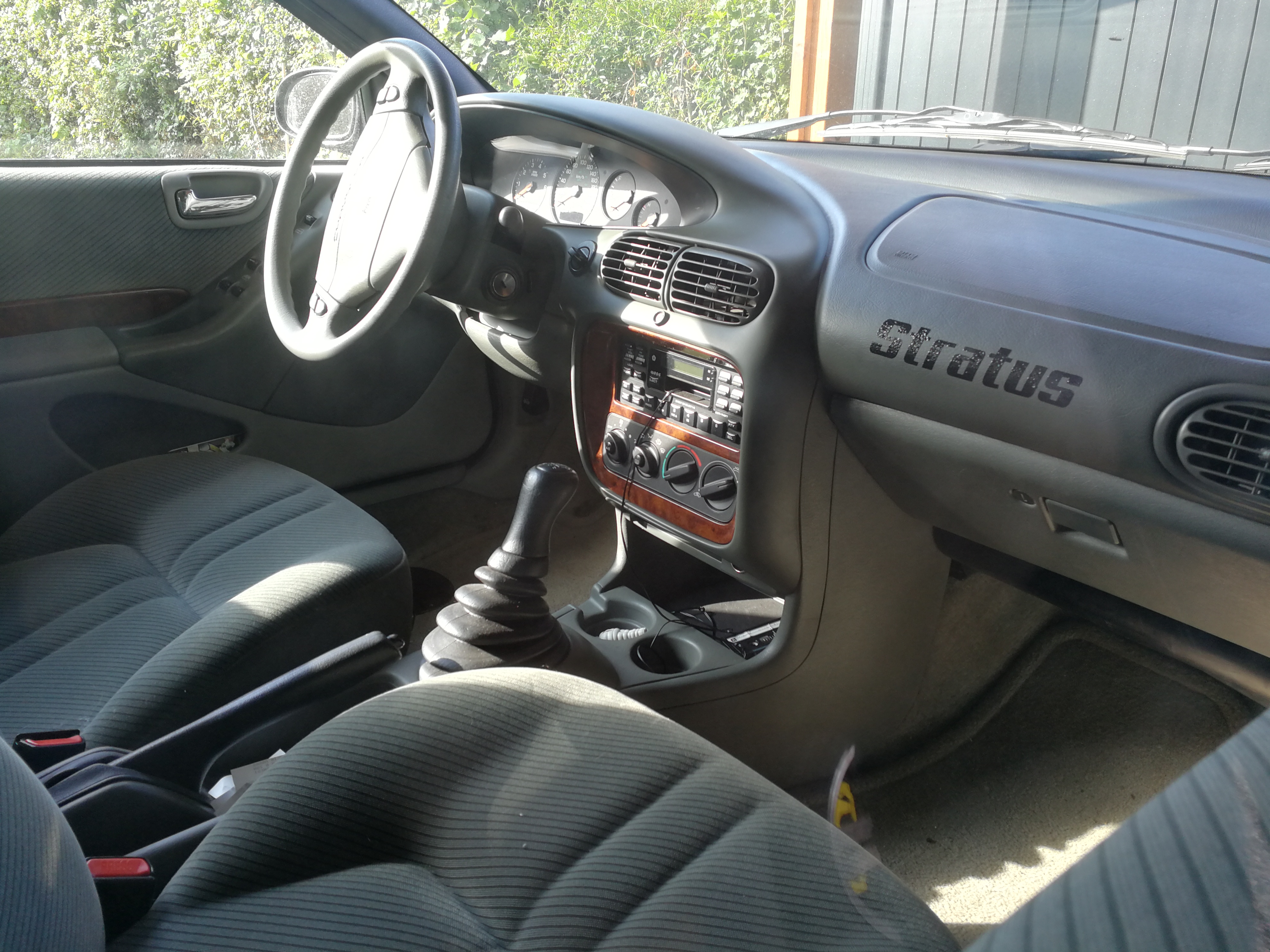
Dodge Stratus Interior

The Dodge Stratus was introduced in February 1995, with two trims: base (later renamed SE for 2000), which came standard with the 2.0 L I4 or optional 2.4 L; and the ES, which came standard with the a 2.0 L from 1994 to 1997, and had a DOHC 2.4 L and a 2.5 L V6 as optional. In 1998 the 2.4 L was standard and the 2.5 L V6 was optional on the ES, and from 1999 to 2000, the 2.5 L V6 was the only engine on the ES model.

The Stratus directly replaced the high-volume Spirit and Dynasty (United States only) to favorable reviews, but lower sales.

Mexico: A turbocharged version of the Stratus was sold in Mexico, with the 2.4 L DOHC 4-cylinder engine and a 4-speed automatic transmission with AutoStick. This engine produced 168 hp (125 kW; 170 PS) at 5200 rpm and 216 lb⋅ft (293 N⋅m) of torque at 2200 rpm.

In 2000, the Stratus was available for its last year of sales in Canada, with the Chrysler Sebring taking over as the company's only lower mid-size sedan - Dodge did not sell the equivalent version in Canada.

=== Chrysler Stratus ===
The Stratus was marketed as the Chrysler Stratus in markets that the Dodge name was not used; such as Europe, South Korea, Argentina, and Brazil. In Brazil, the Stratus had the same engines as the North American version but a higher ground clearance for the road conditions there. In Europe, only the 2.0 L 4-cylinder engine or the 2.5 L V6 engine were available. The European version also had chrome accent moldings along the doors and bumpers.

=== 1995 ===
- Stratus sedan is released.

=== 1996 ===
- The headrest is now "pillow" like on all seats.

=== 1997 ===
- A new center console which included storage space, an integrated armrest, and rear-seat cupholders.

=== 1998 ===
- 2.4 L becomes standard on ES

=== 1999 ===
- V6 engine becomes standard on ES

=== 2000 ===
- Base trim renamed SE

=== Trim levels ===
The Base (1995–1999) was the least expensive trim level of Stratus from 1995 to 1999. The Base was equipped with a 2.0 L I4 engine, a five-speed manual transmission, fifteen-inch black steel wheels with plastic wheel covers, an A/M-F/M stereo with four speakers, air conditioning, manual windows and door locks, cloth seats, and a full instrument cluster.

The SE (1999–2000) was the least expensive trim level of Stratus in 2000. The SE included the same standard equipment as the previously-base Base trim level of Stratus.

The ES (1995–2000) was the top-of-the-line trim level of Stratus from 1995 to 2000. The ES added the following equipment to the Base or SE trim levels: a 2.4 L I4 engine, a four-speed automatic transmission, alloy wheels, a premium A/M-F/M stereo with cassette player and integrated CD changer controls with six speakers, power windows and door locks, keyless entry, a power-adjustable driver's seat, premium cloth seats, and exterior color-keyed side mirrors and door handles.

=== Engines ===
- 2.0 L I4
- 2.4 L I4
- 2.5 L V6

== Accolades ==
- The Cirrus was Motor Trend magazine's Car of the Year for 1995.
- The Cirrus LXi was on Car and Driver magazine's Ten Best list for 1995.
- The Cirrus and Stratus were on Car and Driver magazine's Ten Best list for 1996.
- The Cirrus, Breeze, and Stratus were on Car and Driver magazine's Ten Best list for 1997.

== Production figures ==
=== Breeze ===
Model year	Sales
1996	46,355
1997	70,549
1998	66,620
1999	47,911
2000	2,030
Total	233,465
