= Chrysler A platform =

Automobile platform debuted in 1960

The Chrysler A platform was the basis for smaller rear wheel drive cars in the 1960s. These cars are sometimes referred to as A-body cars.

Cars using the A platform in various markets around the world include:

- 1960–1976 Plymouth Valiant
- 1960–1981 Chrysler Valiant
- 1961–1962 Dodge Lancer
- 1961–1963 DeSoto Rebel
- 1963–1976 Dodge Dart
- 1964–1969 Plymouth Barracuda
- 1971–1976 Plymouth Scamp
- 1970–1976 Plymouth Duster
- 1971–1972 Dodge Demon
- 1971–1978 Valiant Charger
- 1969–1970 Valiant VF
- 1970–1971 Valiant VG

This list is not complete: A-platform vehicles not included on this list were sold in some countries until 1981.

Wheelbases:

- 106.5 in
  - 1960–1962 Valiant, Chrysler Valiant, and Plymouth Valiant (worldwide)
  - 1961–1962 Dodge Lancer
  - 1961–1963 DeSoto Rebel (South Africa)
- 106 in
  - 1963–1966 Plymouth Valiant (USA, Mexico, Europe)
  - 1964–1966 Plymouth Barracuda
  - 1963–1966 Dodge Dart wagon
  - 1965 Valiant V100, Custom 100 (Canada)
- 108 in
  - 1967–1973 Plymouth Valiant
  - 1967–1969 Plymouth Barracuda
  - 1970–1976 Plymouth Duster
  - 1971–1972 Dodge Demon
  - 1973–1976 Dodge Dart Sport
- 111 in
  - 1963–1966 Chrysler Valiant (Argentina, Brazil)
  - 1971–1976 Plymouth Scamp
  - 1974–1976 Plymouth Valiant
  - 1963–1976 Dodge Dart
  - 1963–1964 and 1966 Chrysler Valiant (Canada)
  - 1965 Valiant V200, Custom 200 (Canada)

== 1989 ==
The "A" name was reused again for the mid-size Chrysler LeBaron, Dodge Spirit and Plymouth Acclaim sedans, though this was changed to AA when Chrysler moved to two-letter names for 1990. The "AA" cars lasted until 1995 when replaced by the more modern, but less popular, JA "Cloud Cars" in the same year.

Cars that used the front wheel drive AA platform were:

- 1990–1994 Chrysler LeBaron sedan
- 1989–1995 Chrysler Saratoga (export only)
- 1989–1995 Dodge Spirit
- 1989–1995 Plymouth Acclaim

== See also ==
- Chrysler platforms
