= Power seat =

Electrically-adjustable vehicle seat

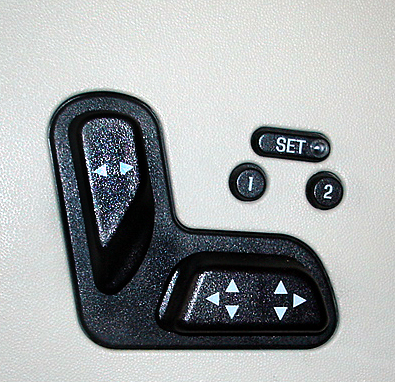
The power seat adjustments in a Lincoln Town Car. Here the seat controls are located on the door panels, next to the memory seat controls. Above the seat settings are the memory control settings which also set the mirrors and pedals.

A power seat in an automobile is a seat in a passenger compartment that can be adjusted using a button, switch or joystick and a set of small electric motors. Most cars with this feature have controls for the driver's seat only, though almost all luxury cars also have power controls for the front passenger seat.

In addition to fore and aft adjustments, power seats can be raised or lowered and tilted to suit the comfort of the driver and/or passenger. Many power seats allow occupants to adjust the seat lumbar or seatback recline, all at the push of a button or flick of a switch.

Cars which do not have this feature have a lever or bar to provide fore and aft adjustments.

== Memory seat ==
Some cars also have memory adjustments, which can recall (usually) two different adjustments of the seat by pressing a button. The 1981 Cadillac was the first car to offer this feature in its modern version. By the 1990s, these systems began allowing customized settings and adjustments for such conveniences as side mirrors, steering wheel, and lumbar support.

== History ==
Power seats began appearing in automobiles in the late 1940s. Most early seats were fore-aft only, which saved little work. The four way power seats showed up in the introduction of the 1955 Ford Thunderbird allowing fore/aft and up/down controls. A six-way power seat appeared in the late 1950s. Most power seats in newer cars are either six- or eight-way.

The earliest form of a "memory" seat was introduced by Ford Motor Company on two of its 1957 models: the Ford Thunderbird and the Mercury Turnpike Cruiser. The "Dial-a-Matic" seat used a letter-and-numerical dial that adjusted the height and either fore or aft of the front seat to the driver's tastes; when the ignition was switched off, it moved back to the rearmost, lowest position to allow easy exit and entry, then moved back to the last "dialed" position when the ignition was started again. The "Dial-a-Matic" seat was dropped after the 1958 model year.

== See also ==
- Power door locks
- Power windows
- Power mirrors
