= Chrysler LH platform =

Platform by Chrysler

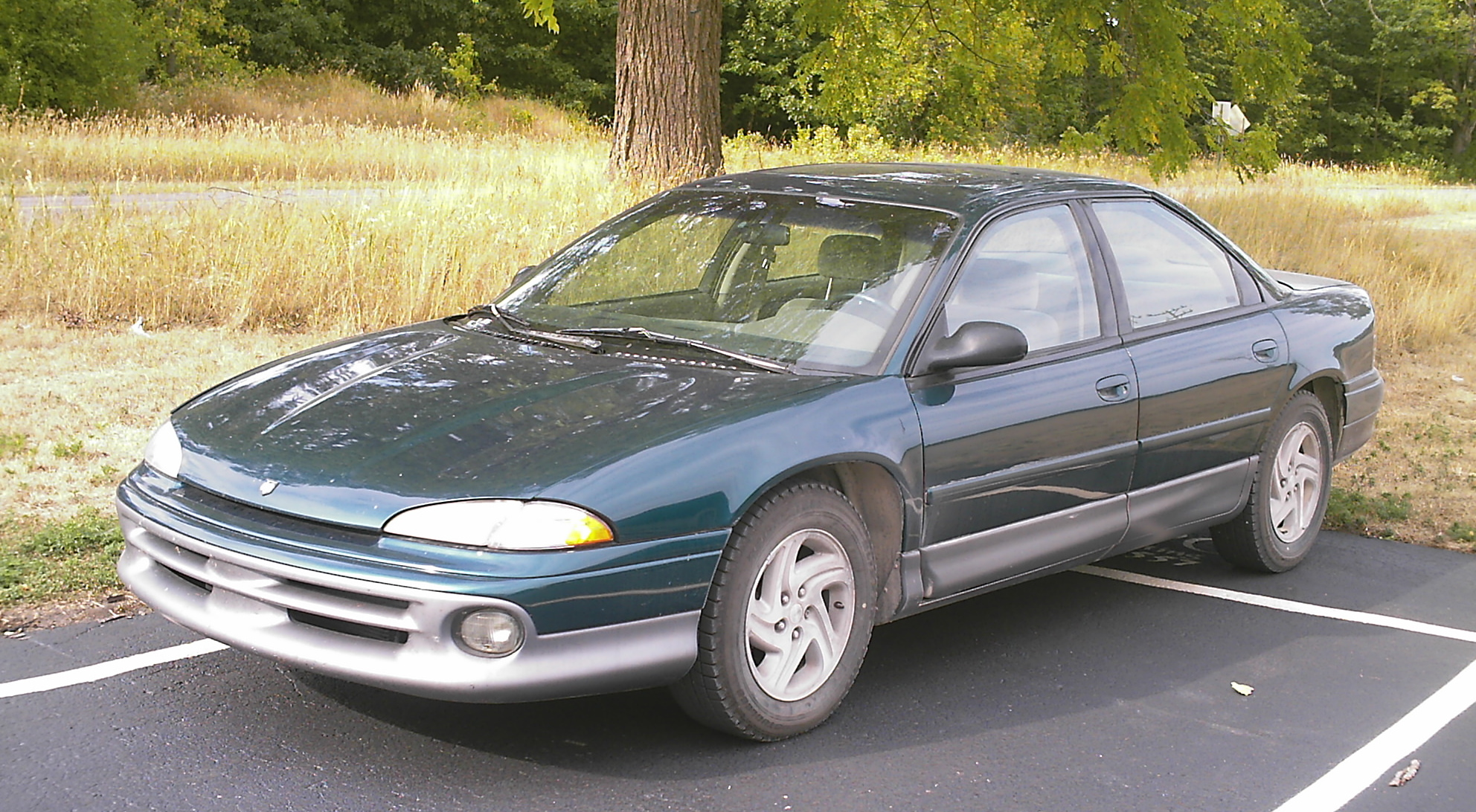
1994 Dodge Intrepid

The LH platform served as the basis for the Chrysler Concorde, Chrysler LHS, Chrysler 300M, Dodge Intrepid, Eagle Vision, and the Chrysler New Yorker. A Plymouth to be called the "Accolade" was planned, but never saw production. The platform pioneered Chrysler's "cab-forward" design, featured on some Chrysler, Dodge, and Eagle cars in the 1990s and early 2000s.

== Development ==
As the 1990s dawned, Chrysler faced renewed financial troubles. Although the US economy slipped into a recession following the 1987 Black Monday stock market crash and the Savings and Loan Crisis, the company's main problems stemmed from a lack of engineering innovation and careless spending during the 1980s years of prosperity. Most of Chrysler's lineup was based on the proven but dated K-car platform, which meant critics routinely criticized the automaker's inability to produce cars competitive with Japanese companies or Ford, which had just struck a coup de grâce with the Taurus line. Moreover, the debt accumulated from expensive purchases, including Italian automaker Lamborghini and American Motors Corporation (AMC), had impacted Chrysler's financial position.

It was time for Chrysler to make a fresh start in the 1990s. The board of directors at Chrysler announced that Lee Iacocca would retire at the end of 1992. Iacocca was promoting Gerald Greenwald as his replacement, but that brought opposition. Although some suspected that he would later turn the leadership over to Bob Lutz, the board instead designated an outsider, the straightlaced Bob Eaton as the new chairman. With Chrysler facing an uncertain future in the late 1980s, engineering teams were now allowed to explore new designs that had been largely discouraged under Iacocca's tenure.

The LH platform was based on the American Motors-developed and Renault-derived Eagle Premier. According to Bob Lutz, "[t]he Premier had an excellent chassis and drove so damned well that it served as a benchmark for the LH ... the spiritual father, the genetic antecedent of the LH is the Premier." Like the Premier, the LH-cars featured a longitudinally-mounted engine with a front-wheel drive drivetrain, unusual in most US front-wheel drive cars, but a hallmark of Renault's designs. This arrangement meant that the design team had to use a chain to connect the automatic transmission with the front differential, a design reminiscent of the original Oldsmobile Toronado though subject to greater wear and noise.

The LH platform team was headed by François Castaing, who was previously responsible for product engineering and development at American Motors Corporation (AMC). Working with an engineering team of only 700, it took just over three years from the styling studio to the showrooms. To give focus for the platform engineering team, the benchmark target was the Eagle Premier.

Exterior styling was heavily influenced by another Chrysler design, which debuted as the Lamborghini Portofino, a concept car introduced at the 1987 Frankfurt Auto Show.

The Dodge and Eagle LH cars competed directly against the Ford Taurus and other mid-sized cars, largely replacing the K-based C-bodies. The Chrysler models competed with upmarket domestics such as Buick and Oldsmobile. The LH cars debuted in 1992 and were updated in 1997. The LH platform was replaced by the rear-wheel drive Chrysler LX platform for the 2005 model year. While Chrysler's sales never reached the levels of its popular rivals, the LH vehicles helped alter the automaker's previously dowdy public image, recasting it as an innovative design leader. The cab-forward look also influenced Chrysler's subsequent compact PL (Chrysler Neon) and mid-size JA platform car designs in the 1990s.

Much as the company had done in the months leading up to the introduction of the K-platform cars in 1980, Chrysler referred directly to the LH platform in advertisements touting the advantages of its "cab-forward" architecture (generally meant to imply wheels moved out towards the corners of the body; a short, sloping hood; and a large windshield extending from its base over the front wheels), and also referred to the platform name for the Chrysler LHS sedan. Although the real "gold mine" of Chrysler's acquisition of American Motors Corporation was the Jeep brand, their minivans and LH sedans also helped to bail the company out of almost certain bankruptcy in the 1990s.

== First generation (1993–1997) ==
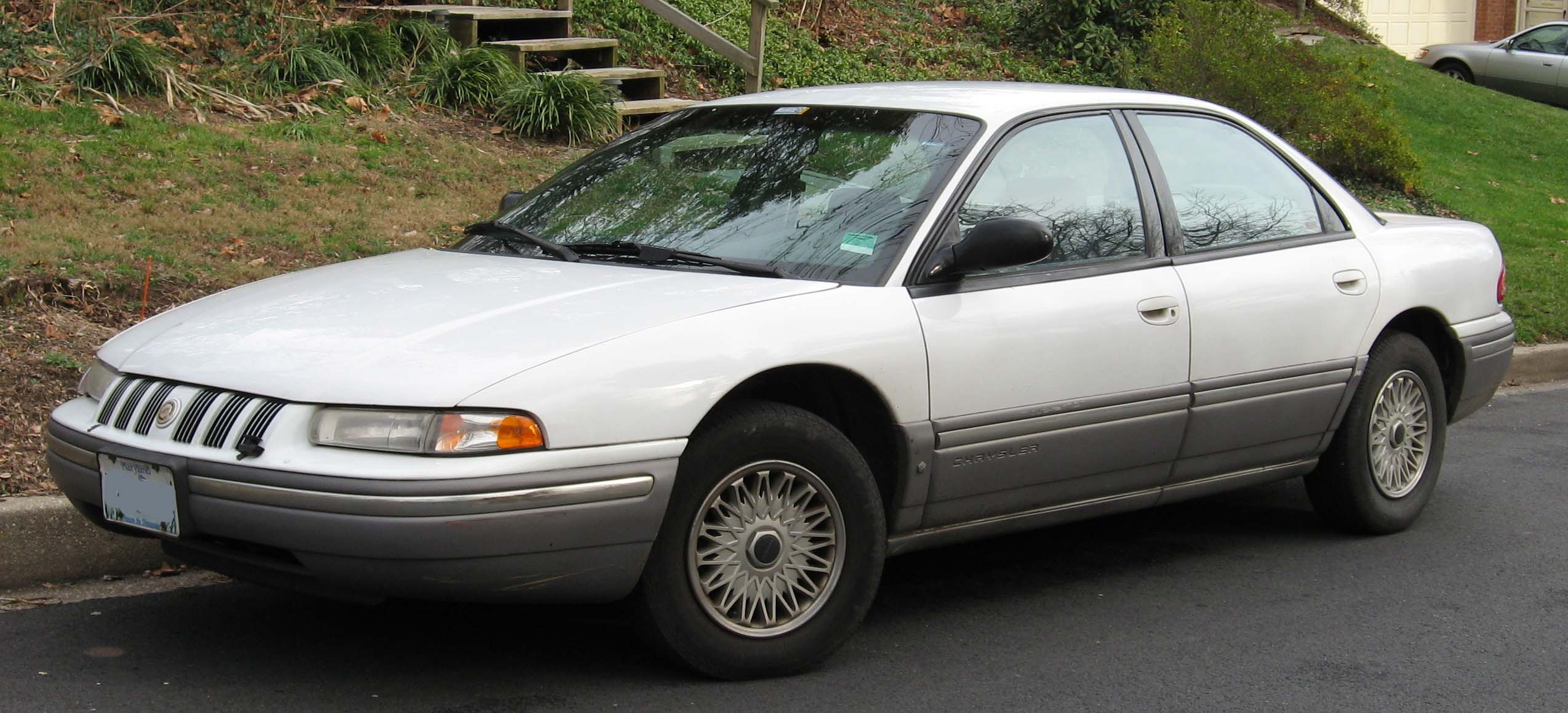
1993–1997 Chrysler Concorde

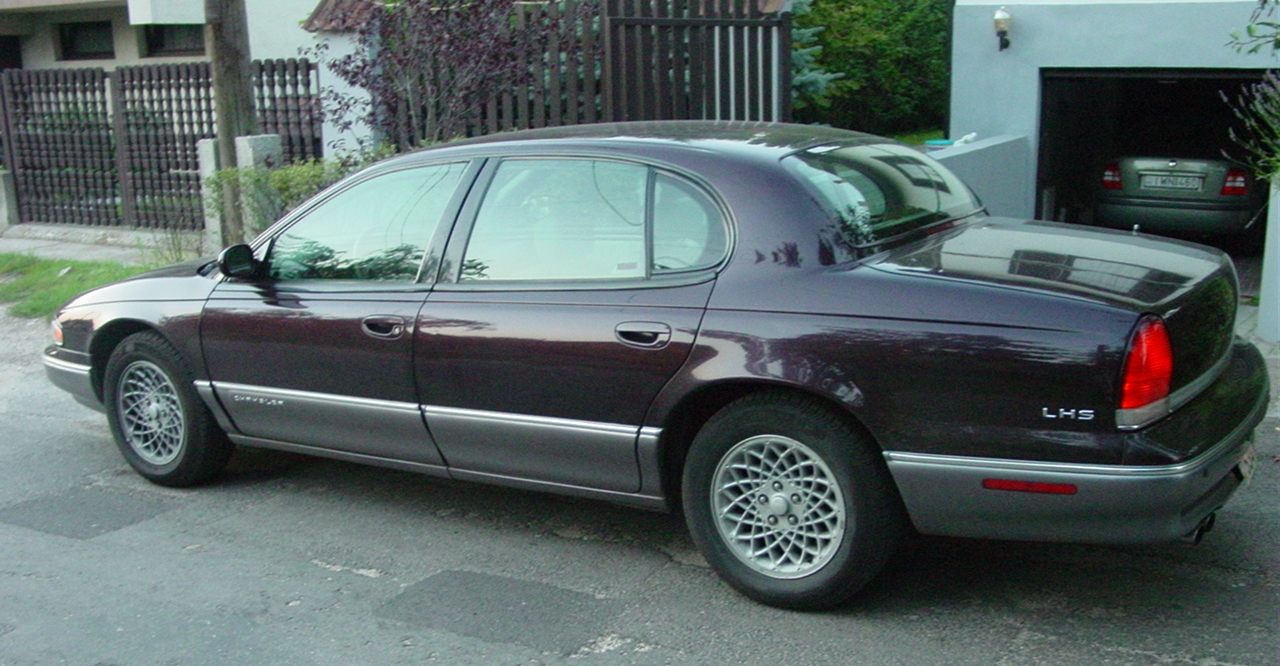
1994–1997 Chrysler LHS

The first generation LH cars used the existing 3.3 L OHV V6 as well as a new 3.5 L SOHC V6, with a four-speed automatic transmission as standard.

Cars built on the first version of the LH platform:

- 1993–1997 Chrysler Concorde
- 1993–1997 Dodge Intrepid
- 1993–1997 Eagle Vision
- 1994–1996 Chrysler New Yorker
- 1994–1997 Chrysler LHS

All versions shared a 113 in (2,870 mm) wheelbase. One year after the original three cars were introduced, the "stretched" LHS and New Yorker had different rear bodywork providing 5 in (127 mm) more overall length as well as a revised rear seat providing more legroom.

Originally, Chrysler came close to giving Plymouth a variant of the LH platform, called the Plymouth Accolade, a name consistent with the then-current Plymouth Acclaim. It was to be a base model below the equipment level of the Intrepid. The Accolade never made it into production.

== Second generation (1998–2004) ==
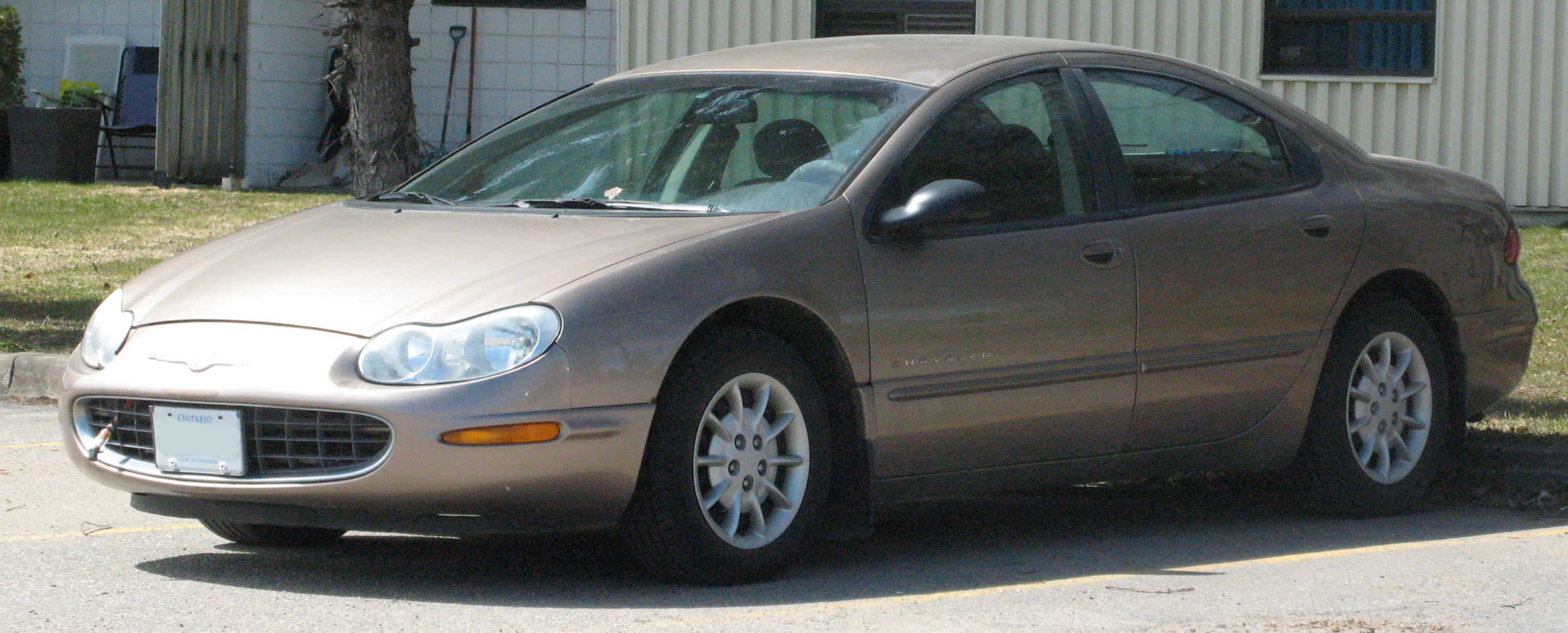
1999 Chrysler Concorde

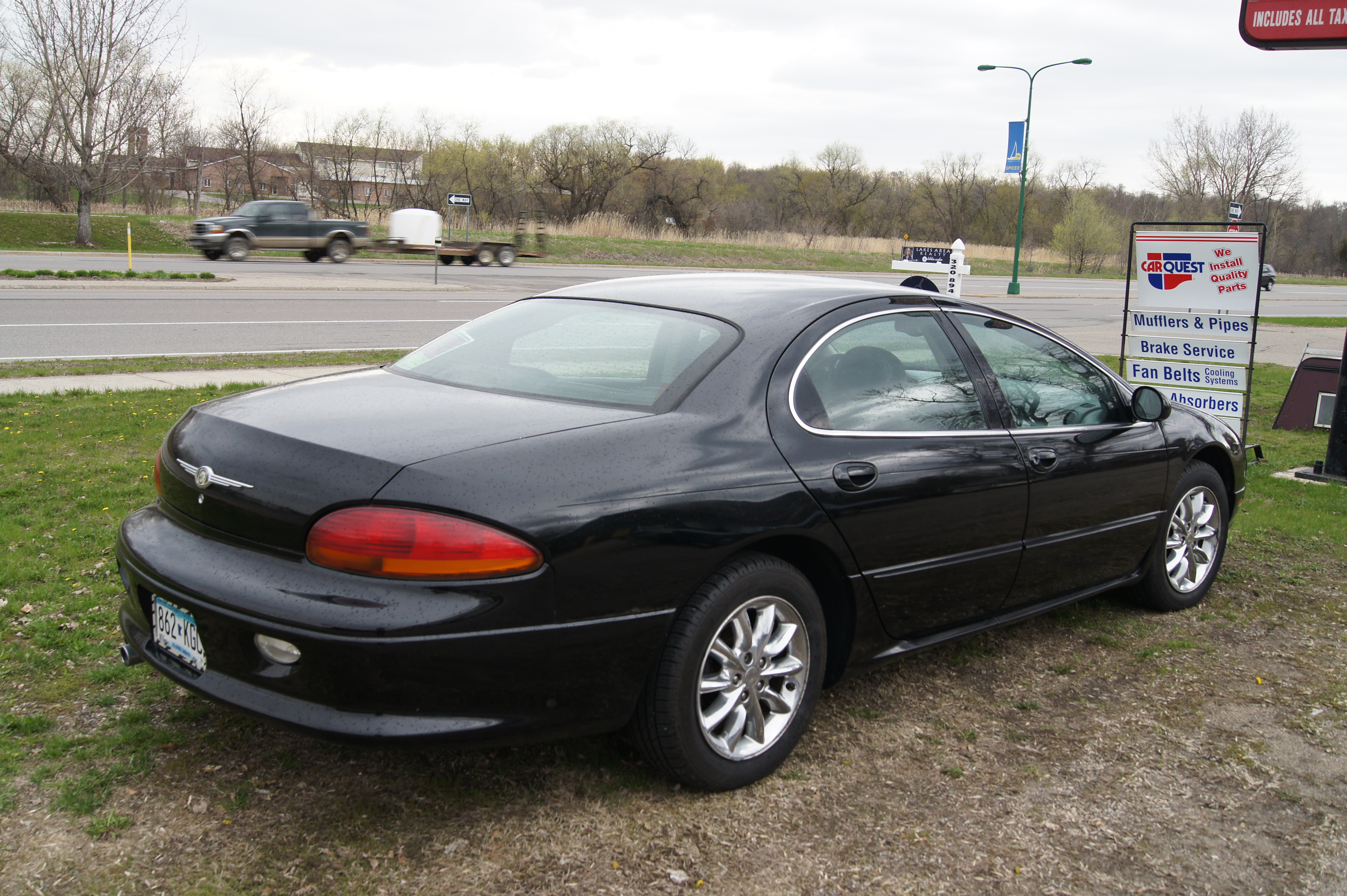
2001 Chrysler LHS

The second generation LH cars used the 2.7 L DOHC V6 and 3.2 L SOHC V6, as well as an updated version of the older 3.5 L, with a four-speed automatic transmission as standard.

Cars built on the second version of the LH platform:

- 1998–2004 Chrysler Concorde
- 1998–2004 Dodge Intrepid
- 1999–2001 Chrysler LHS
- 1999–2004 Chrysler 300M
- 2002–2004 Chrysler Concorde Limited

When Chrysler discontinued the Eagle brand after 1998, the Chrysler 300M was introduced which was originally intended as a replacement for the Eagle Vision. All models again shared a wheelbase of 113 inches (2,870 mm). The 300M was several inches shorter than Concorde, Intrepid, and LHS, due to shorter front and rear overhangs to bring the car's length under 5 metres (197 in) allowing it to appeal to European buyers.

== Media ==
One episode of Robert Reich's 1992 PBS miniseries Made In America focused on the then-yet-to-be-released LH's development and its role in reversing Chrysler's flagging fortunes. A camouflaged Dodge Intrepid is seen being put through the paces at Chrysler's test track, along with concept sketches and other behind-the-scenes activities.

== See also ==
- Chrysler platforms
- Dodge Monaco
- Eagle Premier
- Lamborghini Portofino
