= Mitsubishi 6G7 engine =

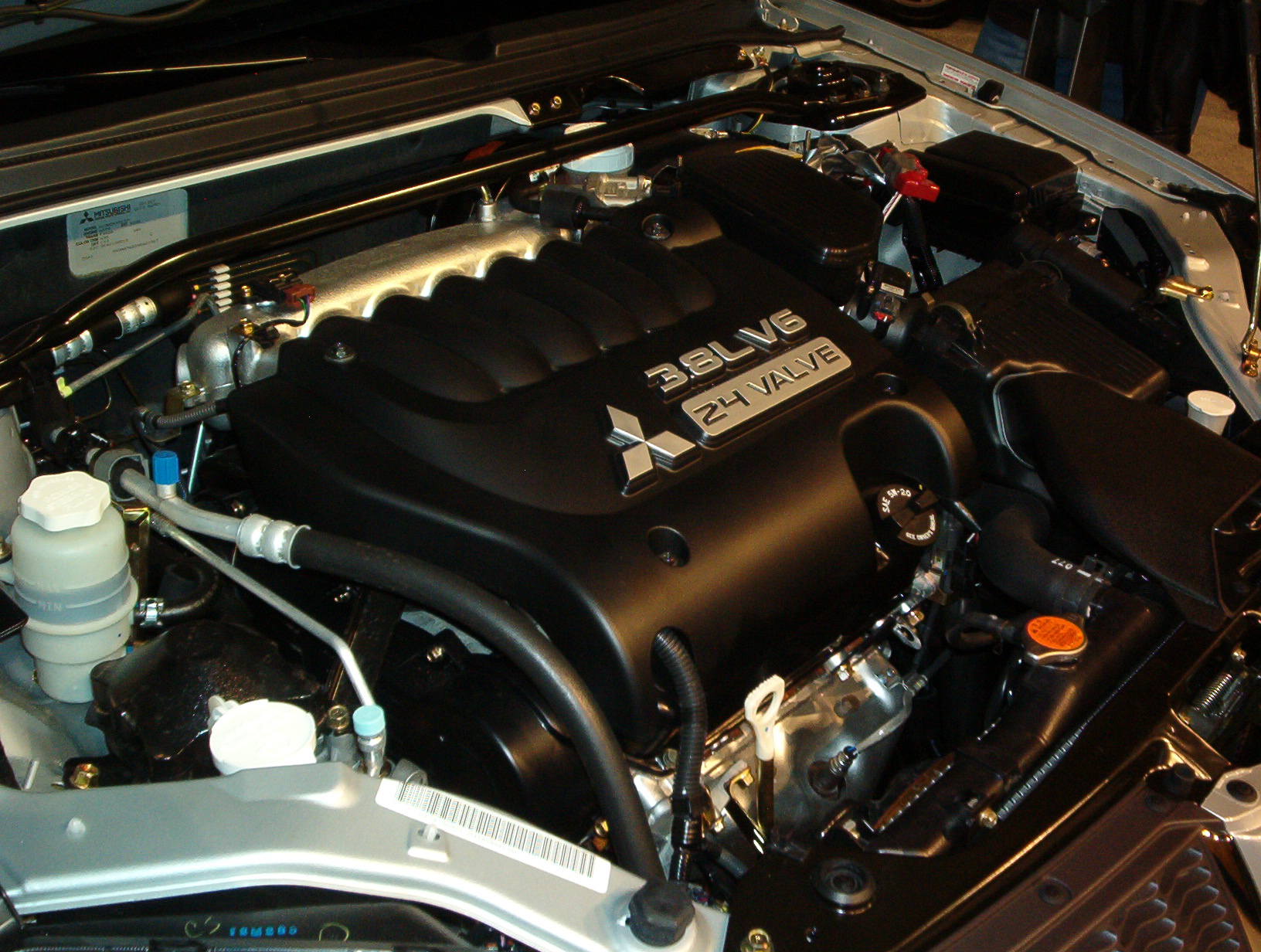
- 6G75 in a 2005 Mitsubishi Galant GTS

Overview
- Manufacturer: Mitsubishi Motors
- Production: 1986–2021

Layout
- Configuration: 60° V6
- Displacement: 2.0–3.8 L; 121.9–233.6 cu in (1,998–3,828 cc)
- Cylinder bore: 74.7 mm (2.94 in); 83.5 mm (3.29 in); 91.1 mm (3.59 in); 93 mm (3.66 in); 95 mm (3.74 in)
- Piston stroke: 76 mm (2.99 in); 85.8 mm (3.38 in); 90 mm (3.54 in)
- Valvetrain: SOHC 2 & 4 valves × cyl. DOHC 4 valves × cyl. with MIVEC (on some versions)
- Compression ratio: 8.0–10.5:1

Combustion
- Supercharger: On Debonair only.
- Turbocharger: with intercooler (on some versions)
- Fuel system: Multi-port fuel injection Direct injection
- Fuel type: Gasoline
- Oil system: Pressure feed, full-flow filtration with Trochoid type oil pump
- Cooling system: Water-cooled

Output
- Power output: 105–324 PS (77–238 kW; 104–320 hp)
- Torque output: 116–315 lb⋅ft (157–427 N⋅m)

Dimensions
- Dry weight: around 155 kg (342 lb)

Chronology
- Successor: Mitsubishi 6B3 engine

The 6G7 series or Cyclone V6 engine is a series of V6 piston engines from Mitsubishi Motors. Five displacement variants were produced from 1986 to 2021, with both SOHC and DOHC, naturally aspirated and turbo charged layouts. The 2.5, 3.0, and 3.5 L versions were also available with gasoline direct injection. MIVEC variable valve timing was used in some versions This engine has been the flagship powerplant of the company except when they briefly built a V8 in 1999–2001. The staple of their high-end sedans, it was given twin-turbos for the Mitsubishi GTO, and became the most powerful car ever built by the company at the time.

This engine was also manufactured by Hyundai Motor Company in South Korea as the Hyundai Sigma engine.

== Bore and Stroke ==
Engine code	Displacement	Bore × stroke
6G71	2.0 L; 121.9 cu in (1,998 cc)	74.7 mm × 76 mm (2.94 in × 2.99 in)
6G72	3.0 L; 181.4 cu in (2,972 cc)	91.1 mm × 76 mm (3.59 in × 2.99 in)
6G73	2.5 L; 152.4 cu in (2,497 cc)	83.5 mm × 76 mm (3.29 in × 2.99 in)
6G74	3.5 L; 213.4 cu in (3,497 cc)	93 mm × 85.8 mm (3.66 in × 3.38 in)
6G75	3.8 L; 233.6 cu in (3,828 cc)	95 mm × 90 mm (3.74 in × 3.54 in)

== 6G71 ==
The 2.0-litre 6G71 model featured SOHC and produced 88 kW (120 PS; 118 hp) at 5,500 rpm and 172 N⋅m (127 lbf⋅ft) at 4,500 rpm. It was installed with two valves per cylinder, and used Mitsubishi's ECI-Multi multiple port fuel injection fuel delivery system. The compression ratio was 8.9:1. An earlier version, with single-point fuel injection, only had 105 PS (77 kW; 104 hp) at 5,000 rpm and 16.1 kg⋅m (158 N⋅m; 116 lb⋅ft) at 4,000 rpm.

A supercharger was installed and exclusive to the Debonair. It produces 150 PS (110 kW; 148 hp) at 5,000 rpm and 221 N⋅m (163 lbf⋅ft) at 3,000 rpm. The compression ratio for the supercharged model is 8.0:1. The 6G71 engine was also converted to run on LPG, a version which was only available to the Debonair and mainly intended for commercial (taxi) use.

=== Applications ===
- 1986–1990 Mitsubishi Galant
- 1986–1992 Mitsubishi Debonair
- 1990–1992 Mitsubishi Diamante/Mitsubishi Sigma

== 6G72 ==
The 3.0-litre 6G72 was manufactured in three different models which featured SOHC with 12 valves, SOHC with 24 valves, and DOHC with 24 valves.

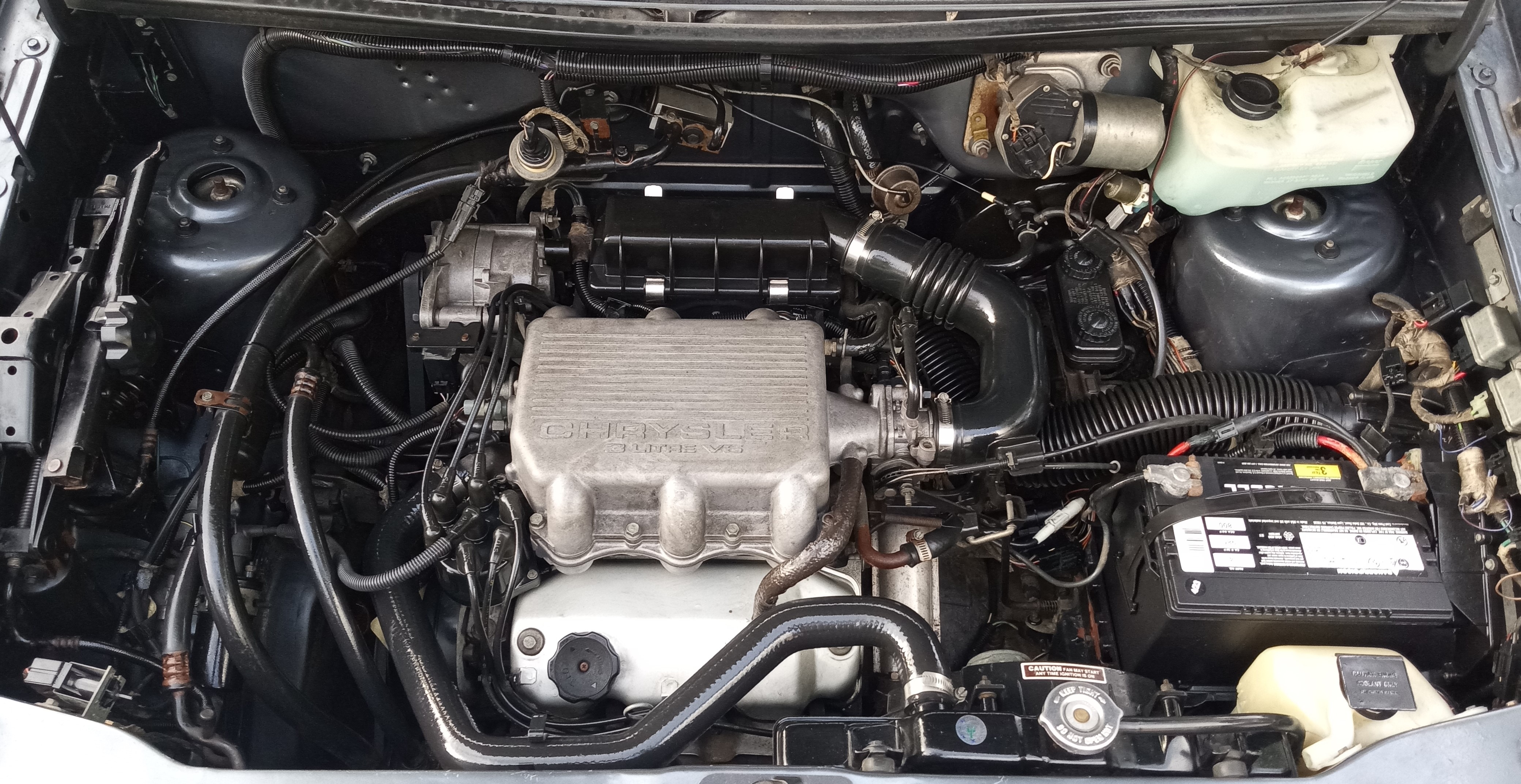
1988 Dodge Caravan 3.0 Liter Engine

The latest version was used in the Mitsubishi Eclipse GT and Galant. Output in 2004 was 210 hp (157 kW; 213 PS) at 5500 rpm with 278 N⋅m (205 lbf⋅ft) of torque at 4000 rpm. In the older version, used in many Chrysler models since 1987, this V6 was an SOHC 12-valve developing 141 hp (105 kW; 143 PS) at 5000 rpm and 172 lb⋅ft (233 N⋅m) of torque at 3600 rpm. The Mitsubishi models were with a 3.0L 6G72 engine SOHC 24-valve developing 195 hp (145 kW; 198 PS) at 5000 rpm and 205 lb⋅ft (278 N⋅m) of torque at 4000 rpm. For the MIVEC engine, output was 273 PS (201 kW; 269 hp) at 6000 rpm and 304 N⋅m (224 lb⋅ft) at 4500 rpm.

The SOHC 12-valve for the second generation of Pajero could produce up to 109 kW (148 PS; 146 hp) and 235 N⋅m (173 lb⋅ft), whereas the SOHC 24-valve could produce up to 133 kW (181 PS; 178 hp) and 255 N⋅m (188 lb⋅ft).

The DOHC 24-valve was used in the Mitsubishi Debonair, 3000GT, and Dodge Stealth producing 222 hp (166 kW; 225 PS) and 205 lb⋅ft (278 N⋅m) of torque with a 10.0:1 compression ratio in naturally aspirated form, and as much as 320 hp (239 kW; 324 PS) and 315 lb⋅ft (427 N⋅m) of torque in turbocharged form. The turbocharged variant had the lowest compression ratio at 8.0:1, with each bank of the V6 having its own independent turbocharger and intercooler. Turbochargers were built by Mitsubishi.

=== Applications ===
- 1986–1992 Mitsubishi Debonair
- 1987–2000 Dodge Caravan/Plymouth Voyager
- 1988–1989 Chrysler New Yorker
- 1988–1990 Dodge Raider
- 1988–1990 Mitsubishi Sigma
- 1988–1993 Dodge Dynasty
- 1988–2021 Mitsubishi Pajero (aka Montero/Shogun)
- 1989–1995 Dodge Spirit/Plymouth Acclaim/Chrysler Saratoga
- 1990 Chrysler Town & Country (early 1989 production only)
- 1990–1991 Chrysler TC by Maserati
- 1990–1993 Dodge Daytona
- 1990–1993 Dodge Ram 50
- 1990–1995 Chrysler LeBaron
- 1990–1996 Mitsubishi Mighty Max
- 1990–1998 Hyundai Sonata
- 1990–1999 Mitsubishi GTO (aka Mitsubishi 3000GT, Dodge Stealth)
- 1990–2002 Mitsubishi Diamante
- 1990–2006 Mitsubishi L200
- 1991–1996 Dodge Stealth
- 1991–1996 Mitsubishi Verada (Australia)
- 1991–2004 Hyundai Galloper (as the Hyundai G6AT)
- 1992–1994 Dodge Shadow/Plymouth Sundance
- 1993–2001 Mitsubishi Magna (Australia)
- 1994–2007 Mitsubishi Delica
- 1997–2007 Mitsubishi Pajero Sport (aka Montero Sport/aka Challenger in Australia)
- 1999–2003 Mitsubishi Galant
- 1991–1999 Mitsubishi 3000GT
- 2000–2005 Mitsubishi Eclipse
- 2001–2005 Dodge Stratus/Chrysler Sebring Coupe
- 2008–2011 Dodge Caravan (China)/Chrysler Grand Voyager (China)

== 6G73 ==
The 2.5-litre 6G73 is a 24-valve SOHC design with two valves running off a single cam lobe on the exhaust valves using a forked rocker arm and each intake valve actuated with two cam lobes, with a smaller bore than the 3.0L version of the same block. Bore and stroke are 83.5 mm × 76 mm (3.29 in × 2.99 in); it is a 60-degree V6 and weighs around 155 kg (342 lb). The engine has low-profile cast aluminum heads which help it to fit into compact engine bays, while pent-roof combustion chambers increase efficiency and make room for four valves per cylinder, arranged in a cross-flow pattern with a "tumble" intake port for both strong breathing and low emissions. Spark plugs are centered in the combustion chambers. The intake valves are 33 mm (1.30 in) in diameter while exhaust valves are 29 mm (1.14 in). The SOHC 24 valve version of the 6G72 uses these same cylinder heads. A toothed timing belt is used. The output of 6G73 is 163 PS (120 kW; 161 hp) at 5,900 rpm with 221 N⋅m (163 lb⋅ft) of torque at 4,350 rpm.

=== Applications ===
- 1990–2002 Mitsubishi Diamante
- 1993–1996 Mitsubishi Galant
- 1995–2000 Chrysler Cirrus
- 1995–2000 Chrysler Sebring
- 1995–2000 Dodge Stratus
- 1995–2000 Dodge Avenger

== 6G74 ==
The 3.5-litre 6G74 is a 24-valve unit available with either SOHC, DOHC, or MIVEC DOHC. Output for the SOHC version varies from 139 kW (189 PS; 186 hp) at 4,750 rpm with 306 N⋅m (226 lb⋅ft) of torque at 3,750 rpm in the Pajero to the highest output of 164 kW (223 PS; 220 hp) at 5,250 rpm with 318 N⋅m (235 lb⋅ft) of torque at 4,500 rpm in the Australian-made Magna Sports, VR-X and Verada GTV/GTVi and 180 kW (245 PS; 241 hp) at 5,500 rpm with 333 N⋅m (246 lb⋅ft) of torque at 4,000 rpm in the Magna Ralliart. For the MIVEC, only available in the Mitsubishi Pajero Evolution, the output is 209 kW (284 PS; 280 hp) at 6,000 and 324 N⋅m (239 lb⋅ft) at 4,500 rpm. It uses Multi-port fuel injection and uses forged steel connecting rods.

The gasoline direct injection version of the 6G74 was launched in April 1997 as the first mass market GDI V6 engine ever produced. It differed from the basic 6G74 in many ways apart from its unique fuel injection system—it had a crown-curved rather than flat piston head, upright intake ports rather than angled, and a 10.4:1 rather than a 10.0:1 compression ratio. Mitsubishi claimed 30 percent better fuel economy, a 30 percent reduction in emissions, and higher power outputs than diesels.

=== Applications ===
- 1992–1998 Mitsubishi Debonair (Japan 256 hp (191 kW; 260 PS))
- 1993–2021 Mitsubishi Pajero (a.k.a. Montero/Shogun) (Only available in GCC area now)
- 1997–2004 Mitsubishi Diamante
- 1999–2001 Mitsubishi Proudia
- 1999–2004 Mitsubishi Montero Sport
- 1999–2005 Mitsubishi Magna/Verada
- 1999–2011 Mitsubishi Pajero Sport/Mitsubishi Challenger
- 2005–2015 Mitsubishi L200/L200 Sportero (Japan, General Countries)
- 2008–2015 Mitsubishi Triton (Japan Domestic, Thailand, Brazil and Middle East)

== 6G75 ==
The 3.8-liter 6G75's output varied from 160 kW (218 PS; 215 hp) and 339 N⋅m (250 lb⋅ft) to 205 kW (279 PS; 275 hp) and 393 N⋅m (290 lb⋅ft) depending on application. The block was taller than that of the 3.5-liter 6G74. The pistons were high-pressure castings, joined to forged steel connecting rods, albeit thinner than that of the 6G74, and a heat-treated, forged steel crankshaft. Intended to be used with 95 RON fuel, lower octane fuels would be detected by the vehicle's knock sensors, and the engine detuned to compensate.

=== Specifications ===
- Engine type: V type, single overhead camshaft
- Bore × stroke: 95 mm × 90 mm (3.74 in × 3.54 in)
- Displacement: 3,828 cc (3.8 L; 233.6 cu in)
- Combustion chamber: pentroof type
- Compression ratio: 10.5:1 (MIVEC), 10:1 (Non MIVEC)
- Firing order: sequential 1-2-3-4-5-6
- Lubrication system: Pressure feed, full-flow filtration
- Lash adjusters on intake and exhaust
- Fuel delivery system: Electronically controlled MFI
- Fuel grade: Factory-tuned for 95 RON unleaded petrol
- Ignition system: Electronically controlled 6-coil (non-distributor)
- Oil pump type: Trochoid type

=== Applications ===
- 2003–2021 Mitsubishi Pajero/Montero
- 2004–2011 Mitsubishi Endeavor
- 2004–2009 Mitsubishi Galant
- 2005–2008 Mitsubishi 380
- 2006–2012 Mitsubishi Eclipse

== See also ==
- List of Mitsubishi engines
- List of Chrysler engines
- Hyundai Sigma engine
