= Power side-view mirror =

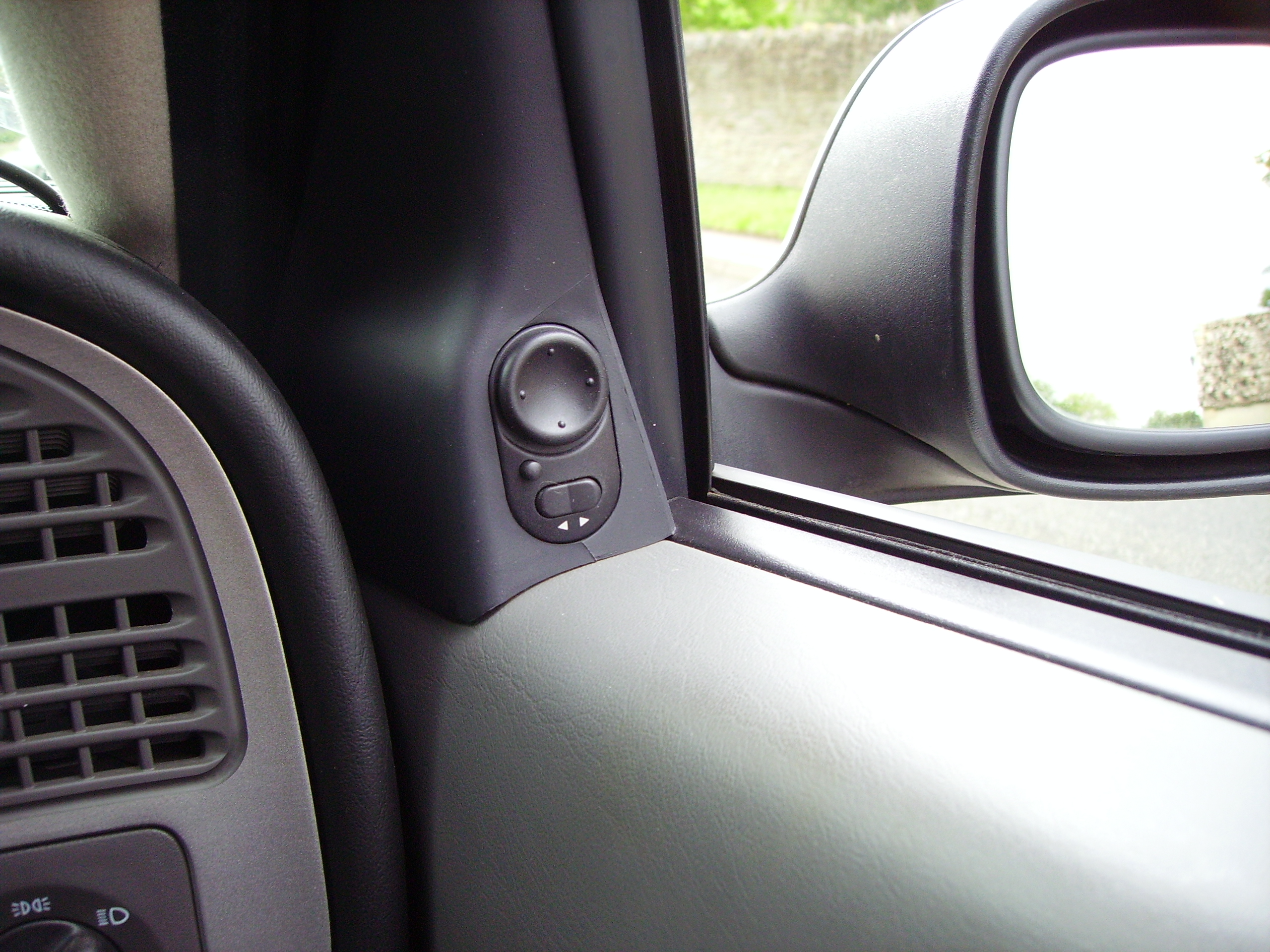
Driver's control for side mirrors, with tiny curb-view button (Saab 9-5).

A power side-view mirror (power side mirror, power wing mirror, or simply power mirror) is a side-view mirror equipped with electrical means for vertical and horizontal adjustment from the inside of the automobile.

The glass of a power mirror may also be electrically heated to keep it from fogging or icing.

Increasingly, power side mirrors incorporate the vehicle's turn signal repeaters. There is evidence to suggest mirror-mounted repeaters may be more effective than repeaters mounted in the previously predominant fender side location.

== Operation ==
Usually, a single control is used to control both left and right side mirrors. A mirror is selected by a switch or a knob. The mirror selector usually has a neutral position with no mirrors selected, to prevent accidental changes of the view. The position of the selected mirror is adjusted by a joystick, a four-way knob, or other type of position control. In luxury designs, power mirror settings may be memorized together with settings of power seats.
