= Chrysler JA platform =

Automobile platform

The JA platform was Chrysler's smaller complement to the LH cars which were larger than the Ks, and a direct size replacement for the last extended K cars, the Acclaim and Spirit. It was a mid-size front-wheel drive automobile platform that was the basis for the Cloud Cars – the Chrysler Cirrus/Dodge Stratus/Plymouth Breeze starting in 1994. Like the LH, it was a cab forward design. While this platform was numerically successful, the highest volume for family cars competing against cars like the Taurus, Accord, or Camry would move to the LH platform cars, which were often classified as full-size.

== 1995 ==
The first JA cars were the 1995 Chrysler Cirrus and Dodge Stratus. These were available with either a 2.0 L 16-valve SOHC, 2.4 L 16-valve DOHC, or a Mitsubishi-designed 2.5 L 24-valve SOHC V6 engine. The Plymouth Breeze was introduced in late 1995 with most of the same options available to the other two models (minus the V6 engine). The JA Platform was produced through to the 2000 model year.

A five-speed manual transmission (NV-T350) was available with the 2.0 L engine, and a four-speed automatic (A604) came with the larger engines. AutoStick was an option for some trim levels with the 2.5 L engine. The wheelbase was 108 in (2,743 mm).

All JA sedans were built at the Chrysler Sterling Heights Assembly Plant in Sterling Heights, Michigan. In Europe, this car became known as Chrysler Stratus, where a 2.0-liter engine with a five-speed manual (A604) and a 2.5-liter V6 engine with a four-speed automatic were available as well.

== 1996 ==
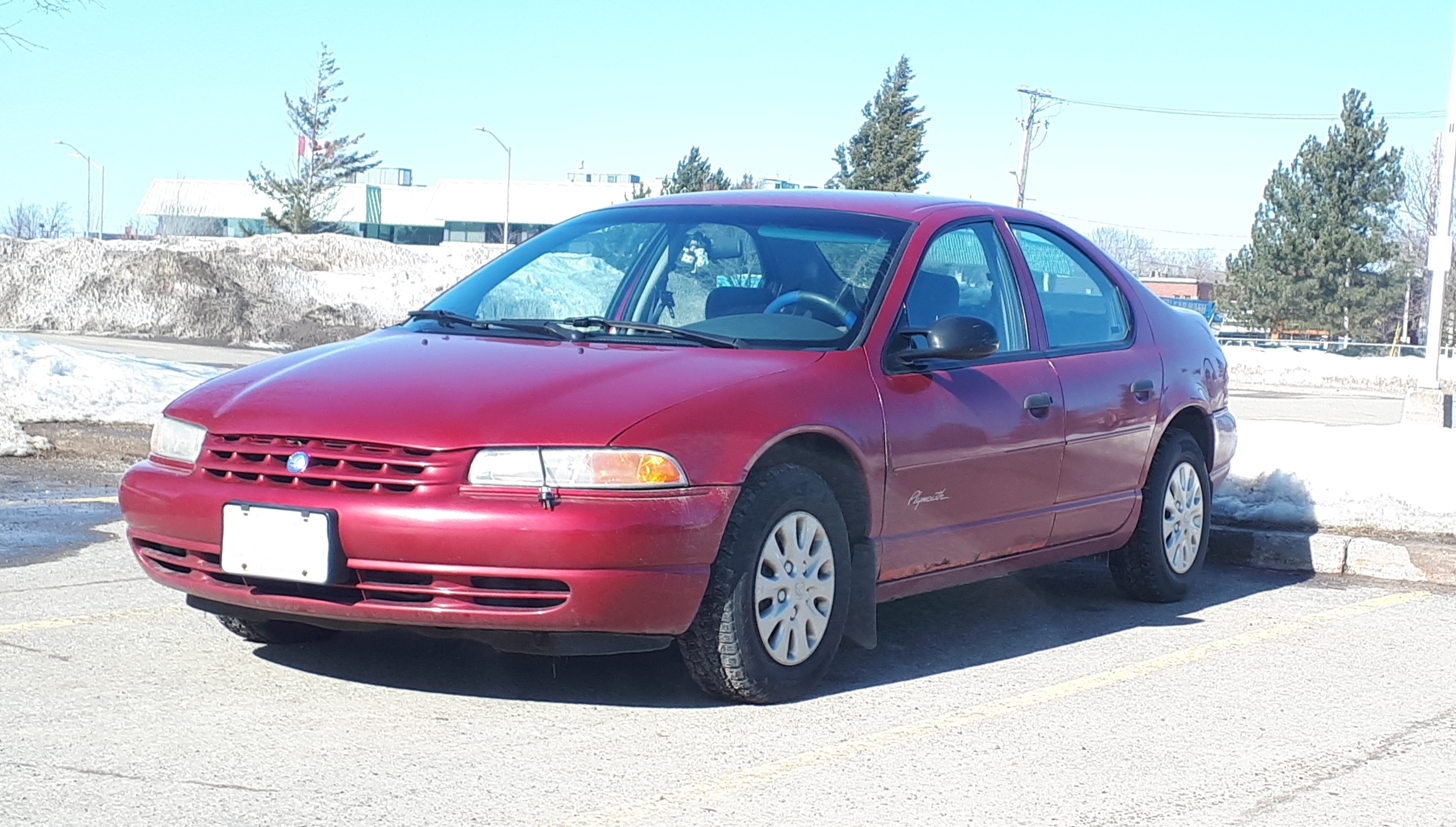
1996–2000 Plymouth Breeze

A modified version of the JA platform called JX debuted in 1995 as the Chrysler Sebring convertible. Changes for the JX included shortening the wheelbase to 106.0 in (2,692 mm), removing the back doors and roof, stiffening the chassis to compensate for the loss of a solid top, and lengthening of the front and rear clips. The JX also had larger rear brake drums, ceramic brake pads, and a cooler thermostat to compensate for the increased weight of the reinforcements to the unibody. The available engines and transmissions are identical to that of the Chrysler Cirrus. Unlike the sedans, the convertibles were assembled in Mexico.

== 2001 ==
The platform was updated in 2000, becoming JR. The Dodge Stratus name was carried over, and the Cirrus became the Chrysler Sebring sedan. The Chrysler Sebring convertible was built on the JR platform as well. The Breeze name was dropped (with the rest of Plymouth).

Engines available were the 2.4 L I4 and the 2.7 L LH V6. The wheelbase remained unchanged, although the track was increased slightly.

The JR sedans were built at the Sterling Heights Assembly Plant, and the convertible moved back there from Mexico. The tooling from Sterling Heights Assembly was sold to Russian-based GAZ in 2006. GAZ moved the whole production line to a plant in Russia to build licensed JR sedans under a different name – GAZ Siber – a facelifted Chrysler Sebring of the first generation. Production ran from 2008 to 2010.

The vehicle nameplates were shuffled with the Diamond Star Motors (DSM) coupes. The first generation of the Avenger became the Stratus coupe, and the newly renamed Chrysler Sebring sedan now shared a name with the second generation Sebring coupe. Both of the coupes were based on the third generation Mitsubishi Eclipse and built alongside the Eclipse. They had nothing in common with the JR platform other than the names.

== See also ==
- Chrysler platforms
- Chrysler Sebring
- Chrysler Cirrus
- Dodge Stratus
- Plymouth Breeze
- Volga Siber
