= Plymouth Acclaim =

American car model

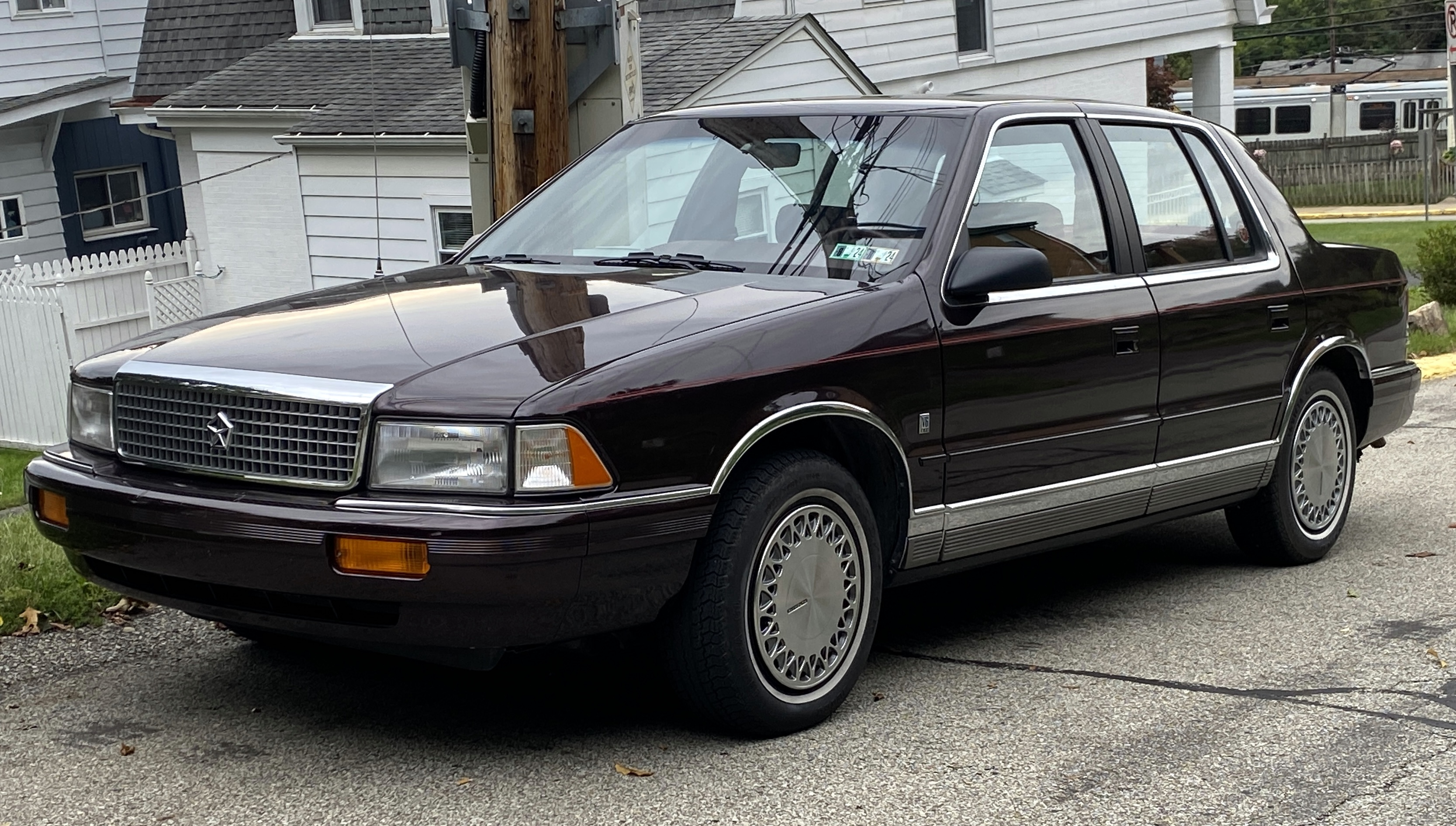
- 1991 Plymouth Acclaim LE

Overview
- Manufacturer: Plymouth (Chrysler)
- Also called: Chrysler Acclaim (Japan & Middle East)
- Production: 1988–December 1994
- Model years: 1989–1995
- Assembly: United States: Newark, Delaware (Newark Assembly; Mexico: Toluca (Toluca Car Assembly)

Body and chassis
- Class: Mid-size car
- Body style: 4-door sedan
- Layout: Transverse front-engine, front-wheel drive
- Platform: AA-body
- Related: Chrysler LeBaron; Chrysler Saratoga; Dodge Spirit

Powertrain
- Engine: 2.5 L K I4; 2.5 L K Turbo I4; 3.0 L Mitsubishi 6G72 V6
- Transmission: 5-speed manual 3-speed A413 automatic 3-speed A670 automatic 4-speed A604 automatic

Dimensions
- Wheelbase: 1991–1995: 103.5 in (2,629 mm); 1989–1990: 103.3 in (2,624 mm)
- Length: 181.2 in (4,602 mm)
- Width: 68.1 in (1,730 mm)
- Height: 1989–1990: 55.5 in (1,410 mm); 1991–1995: 53.5 in (1,359 mm)
- Curb weight: 2,783 lb (1,262 kg) base

Chronology
- Predecessor: Plymouth Caravelle; Plymouth Reliant
- Successor: Plymouth Breeze

The Plymouth Acclaim is a four-door, front-engine, front-drive mid-size sedan manufactured and marketed for 1989–1995 model years, replacing Plymouth's E-body Caravelle and the K-body Reliant. Chrysler marketed badge engineered AA-body variants for its Dodge and Chrysler brands, the Dodge Spirit, the Chrysler LeBaron sedan, and the export-market Chrysler Saratoga. The Acclaim was replaced by the Plymouth Breeze in 1996.

== Platform ==
The Acclaim was a version of the Chrysler Corporation's AA-body 4-door sedan, an evolutionary development of Chrysler's extended K-car platform. Acclaim (and Dodge Spirit) production ended on December 9, 1994, after a short 1995 model year and introduction of the cab-forward Plymouth Breeze. As one of the last K-car derivatives produced by Chrysler, Acclaim production reached just under half a million over its 7-model year run.

== Market positioning ==
The AA-body cars were badge-engineered triplets, as were most Chrysler products of this time. The Acclaim differed from its siblings primarily in wheel choices, bodyside molding, and fascias where it sported its unique taillights and the corporate Plymouth eggcrate-grille. Like the K-body and E-body vehicles they replaced, the Acclaim and Dodge Spirit were both marketed as mainstream variants, while the Chrysler LeBaron was marketed as the luxury variant. Despite this, there was substantial overlap in trims and equipment among each car. For example, a fully loaded Acclaim was almost similar to a base LeBaron in features and price.

In addition to its entry-level base model, the Acclaim was initially available in mid-range LE and high-end LX trim. LE and LX models came equipped with features such including premium cloth seating, power windows/door locks, premium sound systems, bodyside cladding, additional exterior brightwork, and on the latter 15-inch lace-spoke aluminum wheels. In spite of this, the base model accounted for nearly 85 percent of Acclaim sales. Unlike the Spirit, the Acclaim did not receive any sport-oriented models.

The Acclaim has also been characterized as the replacement for the smaller Reliant, though the Sundance launched in 1987 is closer than the Acclaim in most dimensions to the Reliant.

== Changes through the years ==
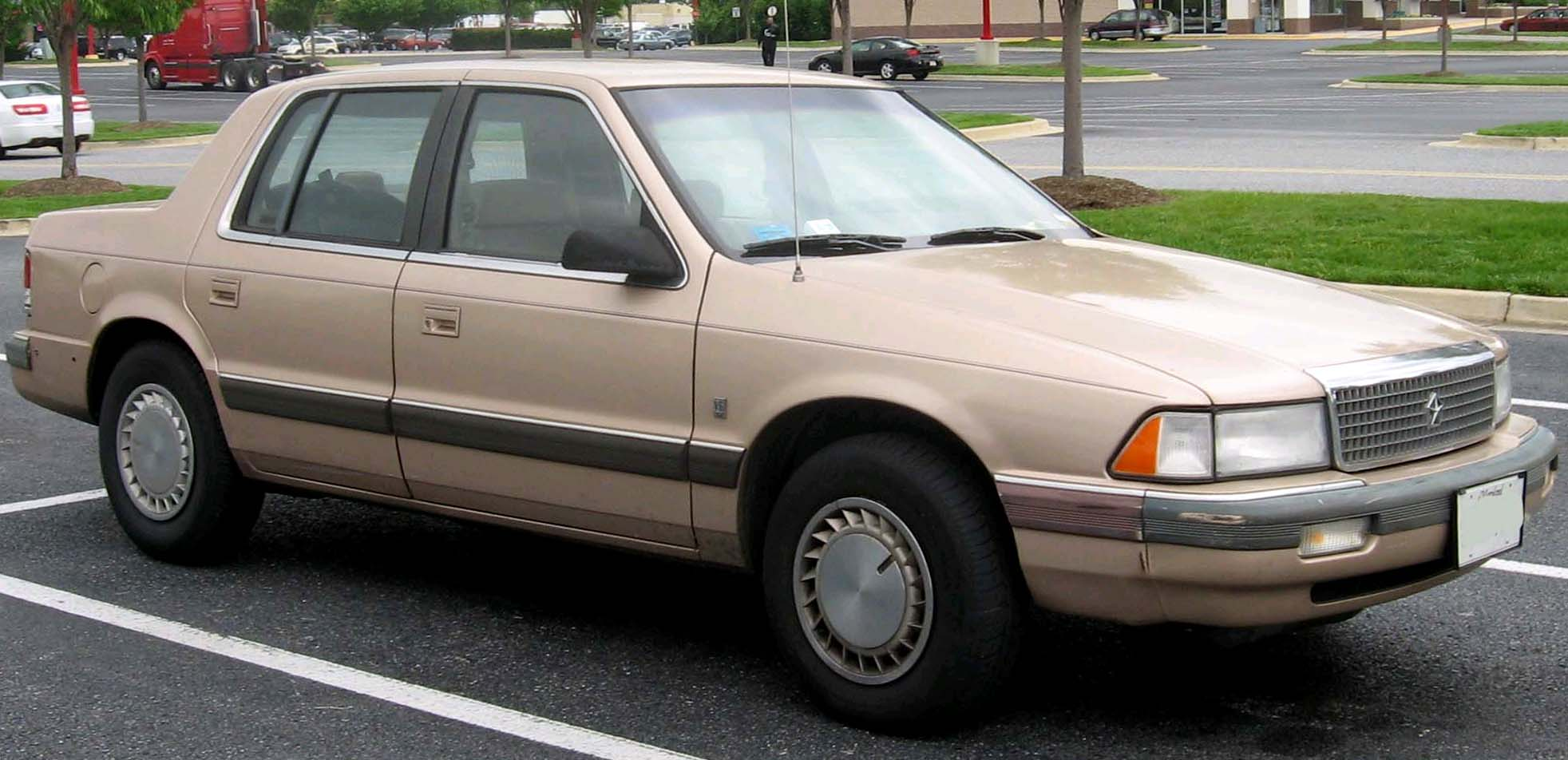
1989–1990 Plymouth Acclaim

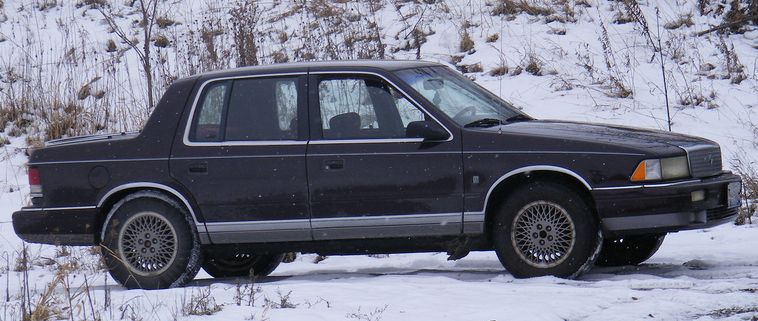
1989–1992 Plymouth Acclaim LX

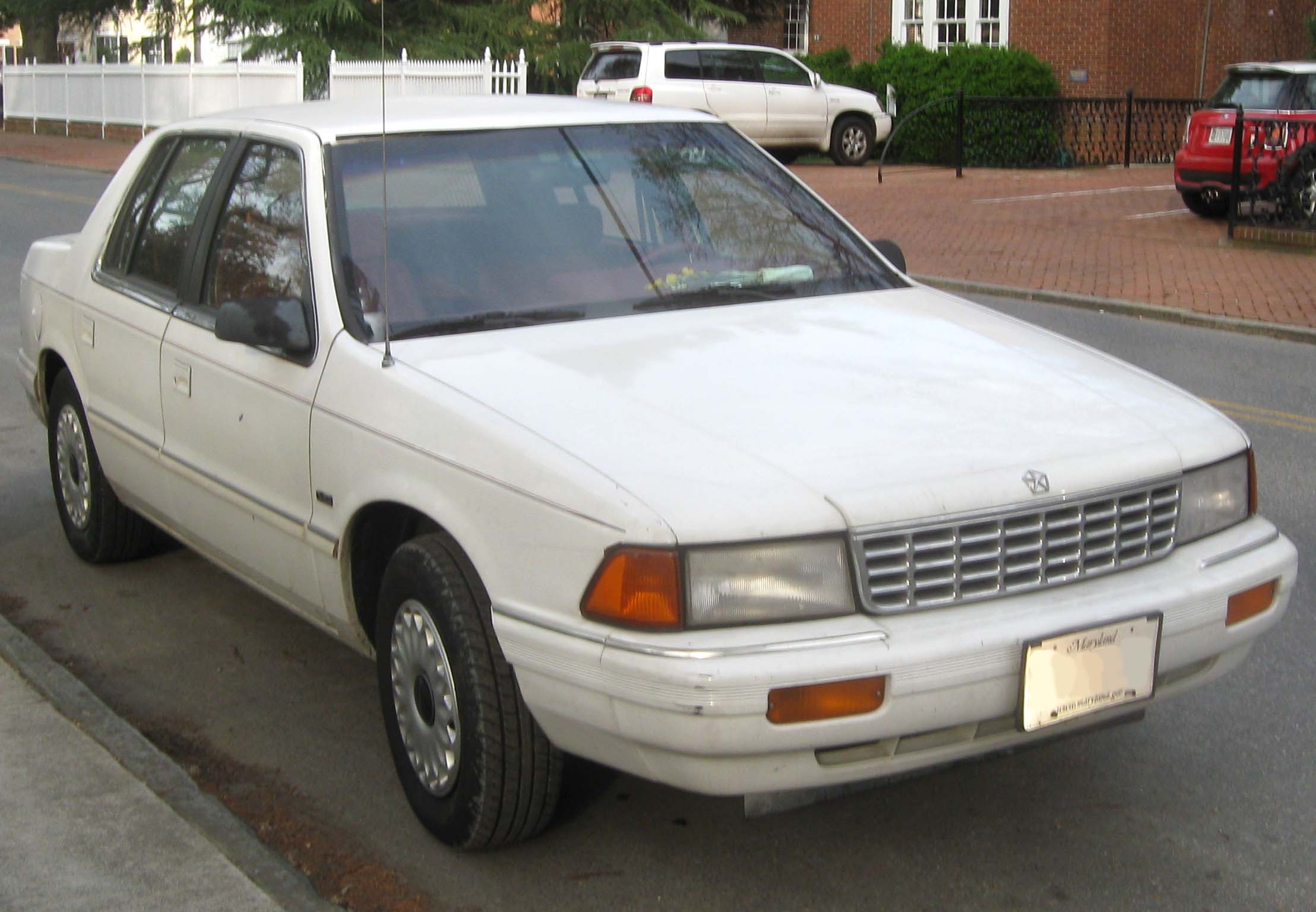
1993–1995 Plymouth Acclaim

For 1992, the Acclaim's three trim levels were consolidated into one base model. At extra cost, it could be equipped with packages and stand-alone options previously included in LE and LX models.

The Acclaim was mildly facelifted for 1993, with a new radiator grille and other minor trim detail changes including a new chrome Pentastar hood ornament. Starting in 1993, the Acclaim was offered with a "Gold Package". This included gold pinstripes, gold bodyside trim, and gold-accented alloy wheels accented with gold paint.

A motorized shoulder belt was added to the front passenger seating position of US-market Acclaims in 1994, to comply with Federal Motor Vehicle Safety Standard 208's requirement for passive restraints. These motorized belts did not comply with Canada's safety standards. As a result, Canadian-market Acclaims continued to use a manual passenger seatbelt, and 1994-1995 Acclaims could not be legally imported in either direction. For 1995, its final model year, the 2.5-liter engine got a slightly revised cylinder head and the 4-speed A604 automatic transmission and anti-lock brakes were both dropped. Otherwise, the Acclaim remained mostly unchanged during its 6-year run.

=== Trim levels ===
- base: 1989–1995
- LE: 1989–1992
- LX: 1989–1992

Production Figures
Year	Units
1989	77,752
1990	110,330
1991	97,146
1992	77,105
1993	55,531
1994	40,294
1995	12,331
Total Production = 470,489

== Engines ==
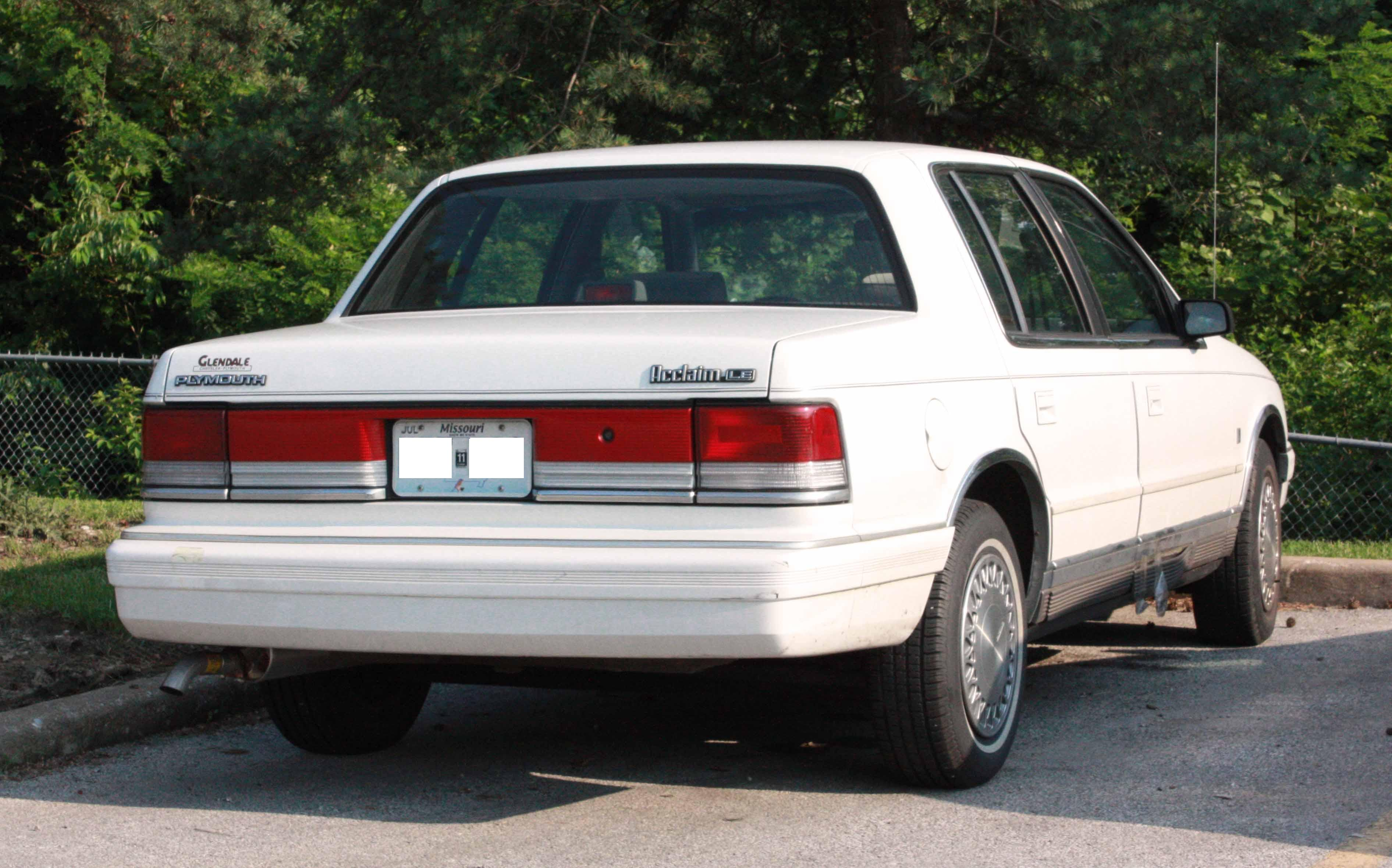
Plymouth Acclaim LE rear view

The Acclaim was available with several different engines. A 2.5 L (153 cu in) Chrysler inline-4 engine producing 100 hp (75 kW) with throttle-body fuel injection was standard equipment. A 3.0 L (183 cu in) Mitsubishi V6 producing 141 hp (105 kW) with multi-point fuel injection was standard on Acclaim LX, optional on the others. Also available on base and LE models from 1989 through 1992 was a turbocharged version of the 2.5-liter four-cylinder producing 150 hp (112 kW). In 1993, 1994 and 1995, a flexible-fuel Acclaim was offered, powered by a 107 hp (80 kW) multipoint fuel injected version of the 2.5-liter engine specially modified to run on fuel containing up to 85% ethanol.

Engines	Displacement	Power at rpm	Torque at rpm	Years
2.5	2,501 cm^{3} (152.6 cu in)	100 hp (75 kW) at 4800	135 lb⋅ft (183 N⋅m) at 2800	1989–1995
2.5 Flexible Fuel	2,501 cm^{3} (152.6 cu in)	105 hp (78 kW) at 4800	141 lb⋅ft (191 N⋅m) at 2400	1993
2.5 Flexible Fuel	2,501 cm^{3} (152.6 cu in)	106 hp (79 kW) at 4400	145 lb⋅ft (197 N⋅m) at 2400	1994
2.5 Turbo	2,501 cm^{3} (152.6 cu in)	150 hp (112 kW) at 4800	180 lb⋅ft (244 N⋅m) at 2000	1989–1990
3.0 V6	2,972 cm^{3} (181.4 cu in)	141 hp (105 kW) at 5000	171 lb⋅ft (232 N⋅m) at 2800	1989–1995

== Transmissions ==
Several 5-speed manual transmissions were available, depending on which engine was installed, but relatively few Acclaims were equipped with manual transmissions. The 3-speed Torqueflite automatic was the most popular installation on Acclaims with TBI and MPFI 4-cylinder engines, and was also widely installed in conjunction with the V6 in 1993 through 1995. From 1989 until 1992, most V6 Acclaims came equipped with the 4-speed A604 electronically controlled automatic.

- 5-speed manual
- 3-speed A413 automatic
- 3-speed A670 automatic
- 4-speed A604 automatic

== Discontinuation and replacement ==
Production ended on December 21, 1994, along with the Dodge Spirit after a short run of 1995 models was produced. The LeBaron sedan was replaced by the Cirrus for 1995, and the Spirit sold alongside the new Dodge Stratus. The Plymouth Breeze was introduced for 1996, sharing the JA platform with the Cirrus and Stratus.

== In popular culture ==
In a commercial for the Acclaim, Tina Turner proclaims that it can hold "six big, gorgeous men" while six large men are shown easily exiting the vehicle. This ad attracted the attention of David Horowitz, who dedicated a 1990 episode of his consumer protection television show Fight Back! with David Horowitz to testing the ad's claims. Horowitz recruited six men who were each over six feet tall to reenact the commercial with an identically specced Acclaim sedan. He confirmed that they could all be safely seated and strapped into the vehicle and that they were able to easily enter/exit the vehicle in the same manner as shown in the commercial. However, when interviewed, the men unanimously agreed that they felt cramped and uncomfortable when seated in the vehicle together and would only be willing to ride a short distance in such conditions. Horowitz thus concluded that while the advertisement in question was proven to not be deceptive and the Acclaim's interior room would prove adequate for its intended customers, he believed that Chrysler was exaggerating how accommodating its interior really was.
