= Chrysler Sebring =

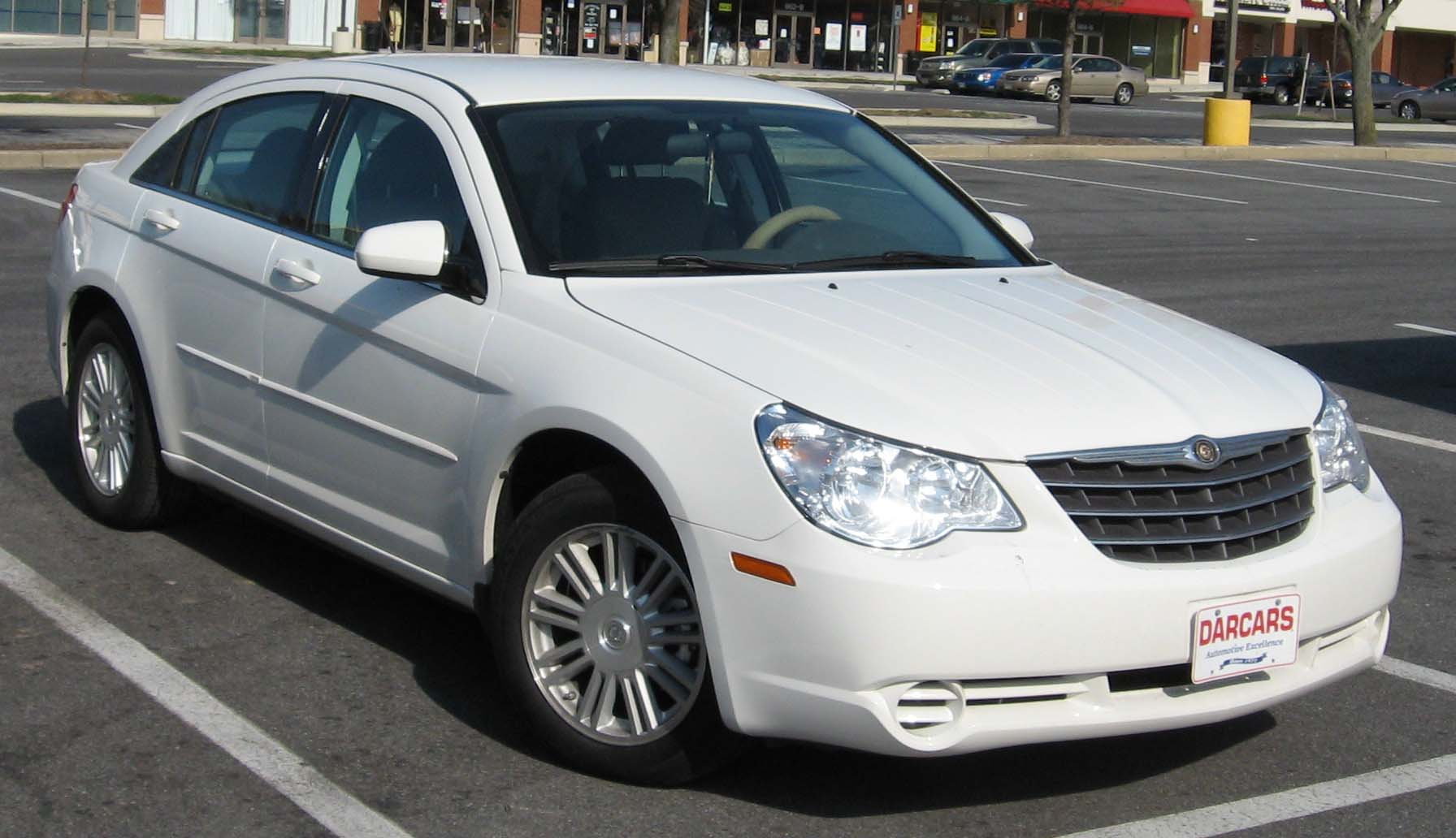

Overview
- Manufacturer: Chrysler (Note: Chrysler Corporation (1994–1998); DaimlerChrysler (1998–2007); Chrysler LLC (2007–2009); Chrysler Group LLC (2009–2010))
- Production: 1994–2010

Body and chassis
- Class: Mid-size car

Chronology
- Predecessor: Chrysler LeBaron (for coupe and convertible); Chrysler Cirrus (for sedan)
- Successor: Chrysler 200 (for sedan and convertible); GAZ Volga Siber (Russia)

The Chrysler Sebring (/ˈsiːbrɪŋ/ SEE-bring) is a mid-size automobile manufactured and marketed by Chrysler from 1995 to 2010 in convertible (three generations), sedan (two generations), and coupe (two generations) body styles. Both coupe generations were a Chrysler design with engineering input from Mitsubishi and were built at Mitsubishi’s Normal, Illinois facility (operated then by Diamond-Star Motors). The range was introduced in 1995, with the Coupe replacing the Chrysler LeBaron coupe. In 1996 Chrysler introduced the convertible, replacing its LeBaron counterpart.

In 2000, (then) DaimlerChrysler presented the redesigned Sebrings — Sedan, Coupe, and Convertible — at the New York Auto Show for model year 2001. The Coupe used a variant of the Mitsubishi Eclipse ST Platform, while the sedan and convertible used the Chrysler JR platform successors to the Chrysler Cirrus. The coupe was discontinued after 2005.

The third generation sedan was introduced for 2007, and a revised convertible the following year. New options included all-wheel drive on sedans and an available retractable metal top for the convertible. All Sebring models were replaced by the Chrysler 200 for the 2011 model year.

== First generation (FJ/JX; 1995) ==
First generation
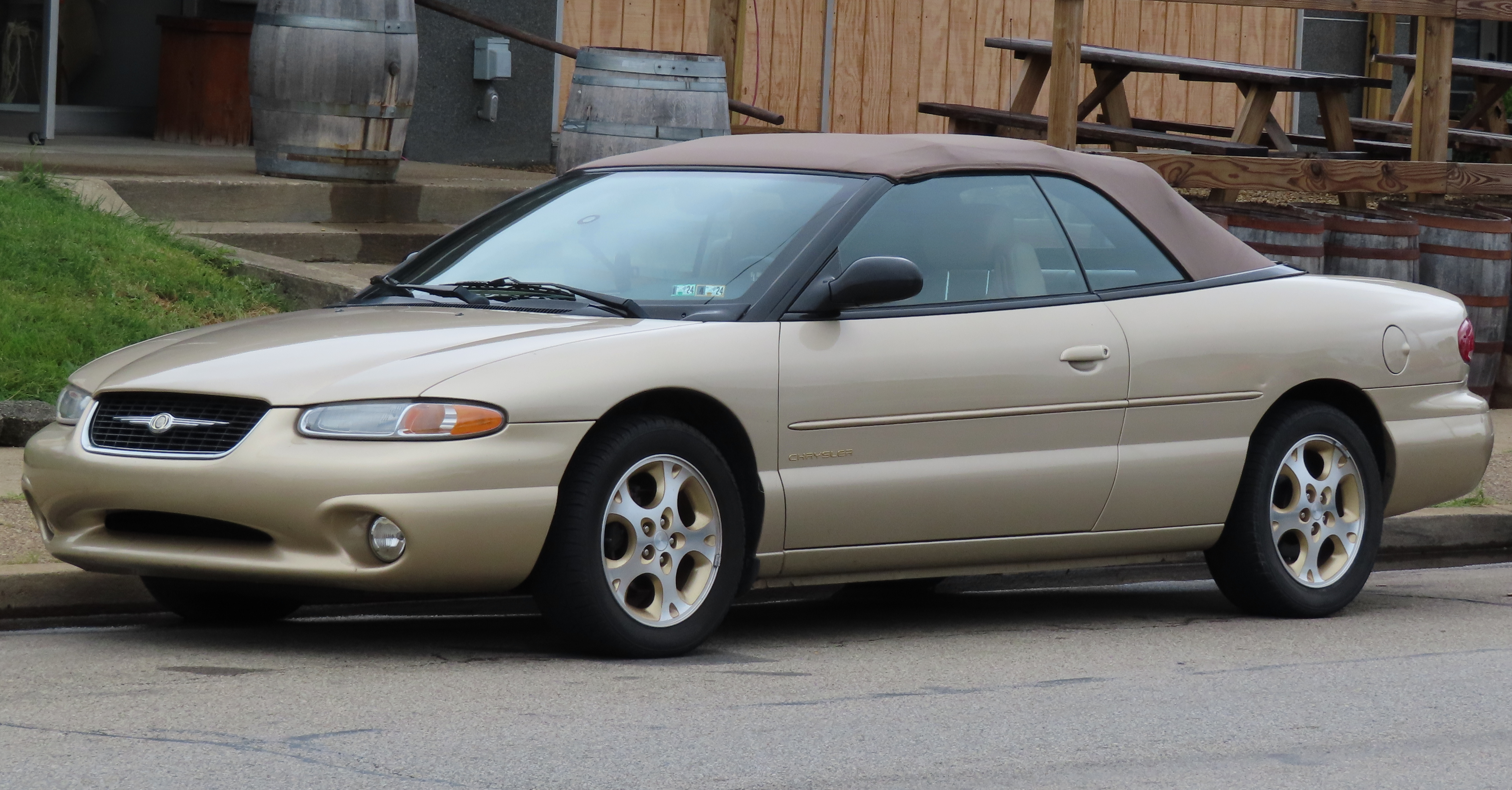
- 1999–2000 Chrysler Sebring convertible

Overview
- Also called: Chrysler Stratus (Europe, convertible)
- Production: December 1994–2000
- Model years: 1995–2000 (coupe); 1996–2000 (convertible)
- Assembly: Normal, Illinois, United States (coupe); Toluca, Mexico (convertibles)

Body and chassis
- Body style: 2-door coupe 2-door convertible
- Layout: Transverse front-engine, front-wheel drive
- Platform: Convertible: Chrysler JX platform Coupe: Chrysler FJ platform
- Related: Convertible: Chrysler Cirrus; Dodge Stratus; Plymouth Breeze; Coupe: Dodge Avenger; Eagle Talon; Mitsubishi Eclipse

Powertrain
- Engine: Coupe: 2.0 L 420A I4 (gasoline); 2.5 L Mitsubishi 6G73 V6 (gasoline); Convertible: 2.4 L EDZ I4 (gasoline); 2.4 L EDV/EDT I4 (t/c gasoline); 2.5 L Mitsubishi 6G73 V6 (gasoline)
- Transmission: 5-speed manual 4-speed Ultradrive 41TE automatic

Dimensions
- Wheelbase: Convertible: 106.0 in (2,692 mm); Coupe: 103.7 in (2,634 mm)
- Length: Convertible: 193.0 in (4,902 mm) (1996–2000); Coupe: 187.4 in (4,760 mm) (1995–1996); 191.0 in (4,851 mm) (1997–1998); 190.9 in (4,849 mm) (1999–2000)
- Width: Convertible: 69.2 in (1,758 mm); Coupe: 69.7 in (1,770 mm)
- Height: Convertible: 54.8 in (1,392 mm); Coupe: 51.0 in (1,295 mm) (1995–1998); 53.0 in (1,346 mm) (1998–2000); Coupe V6: 51.4 in (1,306 mm) (1997–1998)

The Chrysler Sebring was introduced as a coupe for 1995, and as a convertible in 1996, both models replacing the Chrysler LeBaron convertible and coupe. The convertible was built off the Chrysler JA platform also used for the Cirrus sedan, while the coupe was based on the Mitsubishi Eclipse.

The Sebring was named after Sebring, Florida, site of the car endurance race the 12 Hours of Sebring. The name was first used by Chrysler's Plymouth division as a trim level of the Satellite mid-size coupe in the 1970s.

=== Coupe (1995–2000) ===
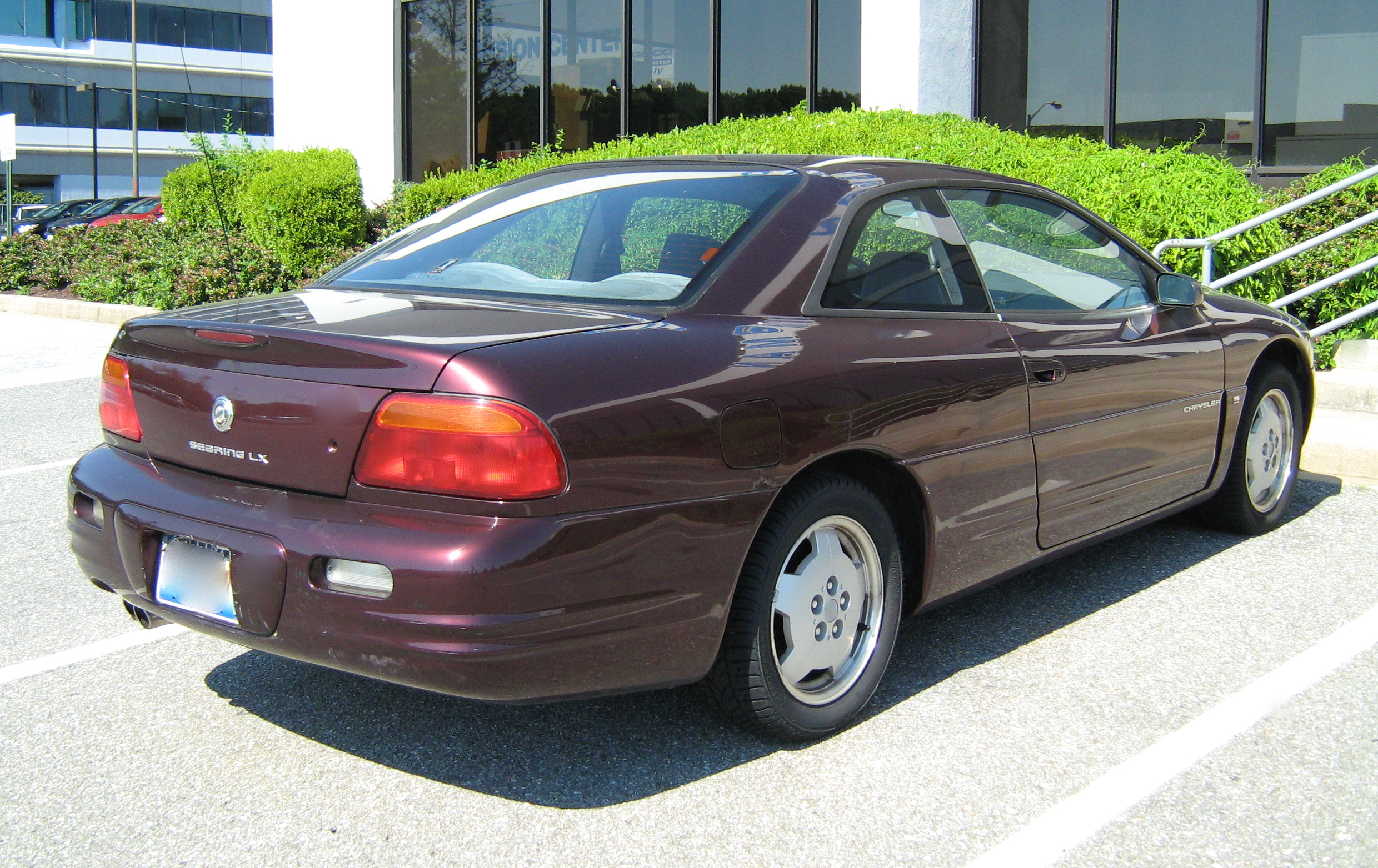
1997–2000 Chrysler Sebring coupe

Succeeding the Chrysler LeBaron coupe, the Sebring Coupe was a significant departure from the sedan and convertible, alongside which it was marketed. Styled by Chrysler and manufactured at the Mitsubishi plant in Normal, Illinois — the Coupe was built on the same Mitsubishi platform as the Mitsubishi Eclipse (and its rebadge, the Eagle Talon), Mitsubishi Galant, and Dodge Avenger),.

The first generation Coupe was introduced in April 1995, several months after the related Dodge Avenger. Despite its similarities to the Avenger, Chrysler's suspension was more softly tuned. LXi models further benefited from rear sway bars, a slightly different tuned fully independent suspension, along with 17-inch wheels wrapped with Goodyear Eagle performance tires. The Coupe featured seating for five and a trunk volume comparable to contemporary mid-size coupes. Trunk capacity was similar to that of many mid-size cars, capable of handling more than one set of golf clubs. At the time of its introduction, the Sebring sported a crosshair grille, recalling the original Chrysler 300 letter series. The grille was non-functional, with the lower half under the bumper used for airflow intake in a "bottom breather" function.

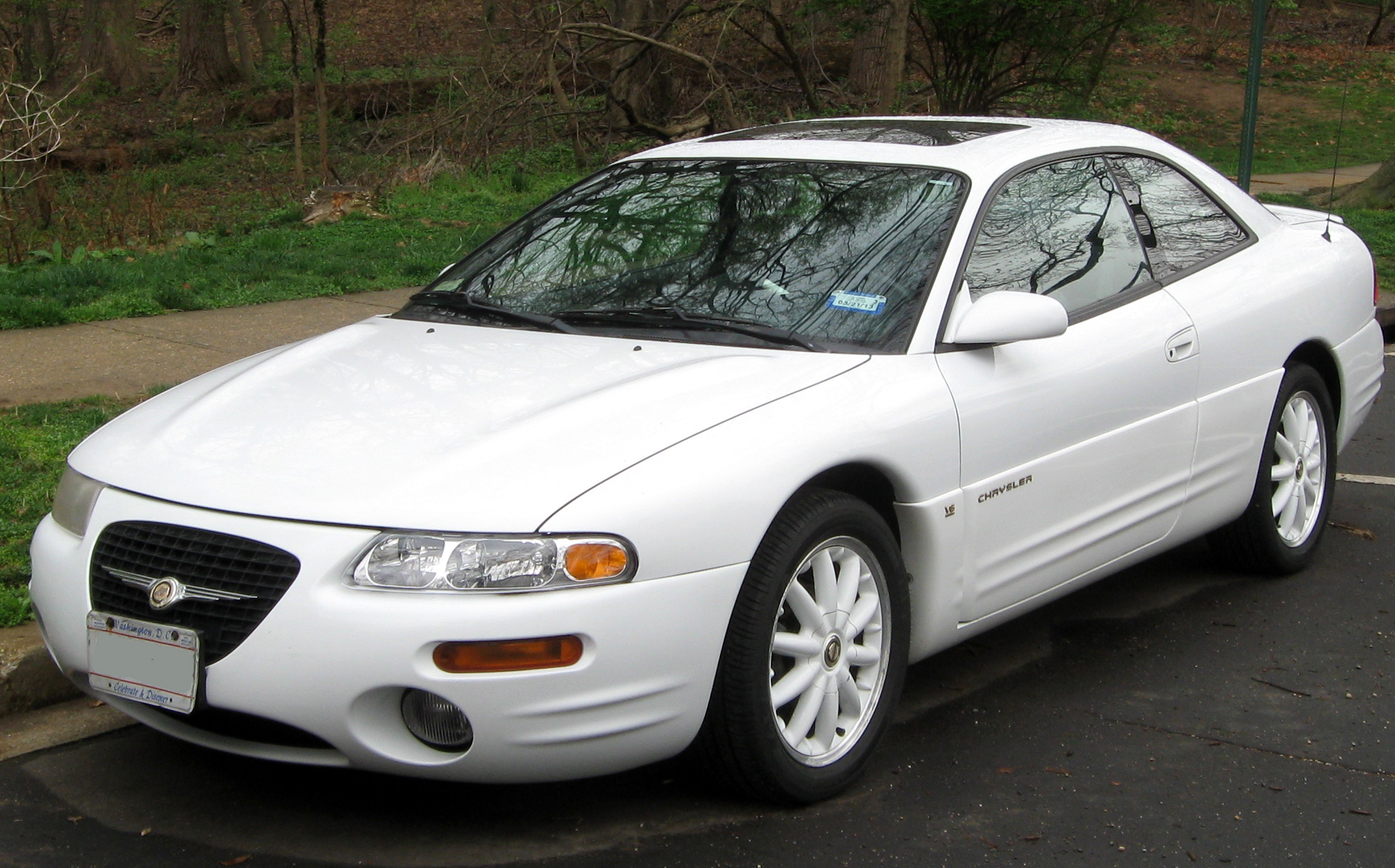
1997–2000 Chrysler Sebring coupe

The Coupe received a minor facelift for 1997. Its grille was replaced with a slightly larger black grid. The facelift also made the Sebring the first car to use Chrysler's "wings" logo. The 1997 restyle also saw the addition of ribbed lower body cladding and new wheel styles. Features offered on Sebring coupes included 4-wheel disc brakes with ABS, adaptive automatic transmissions, and fully independent suspensions, along with a host of power-operated features. Sebring also offered variable speed rack and pinion steering, 17-inch aluminum wheels with Goodyear Eagle tires, 4-wheel double wishbone suspension, one-touch power windows, one-touch moonroof, electrochromic mirror with compass, power accessory delay ignition (which allowed occupants to operate power window switches when the ignition is turned off), and Homelink universal transmitter, among other options.

The Coupe received a 5-star frontal safety rating, the highest rating possible. First-generation body style coupes continued to be sold past the 2000 model year to select export markets.

Trim levels:

- LX — 1995–2000
- LXi — 1995–2000

=== Convertible (1996–2000) ===
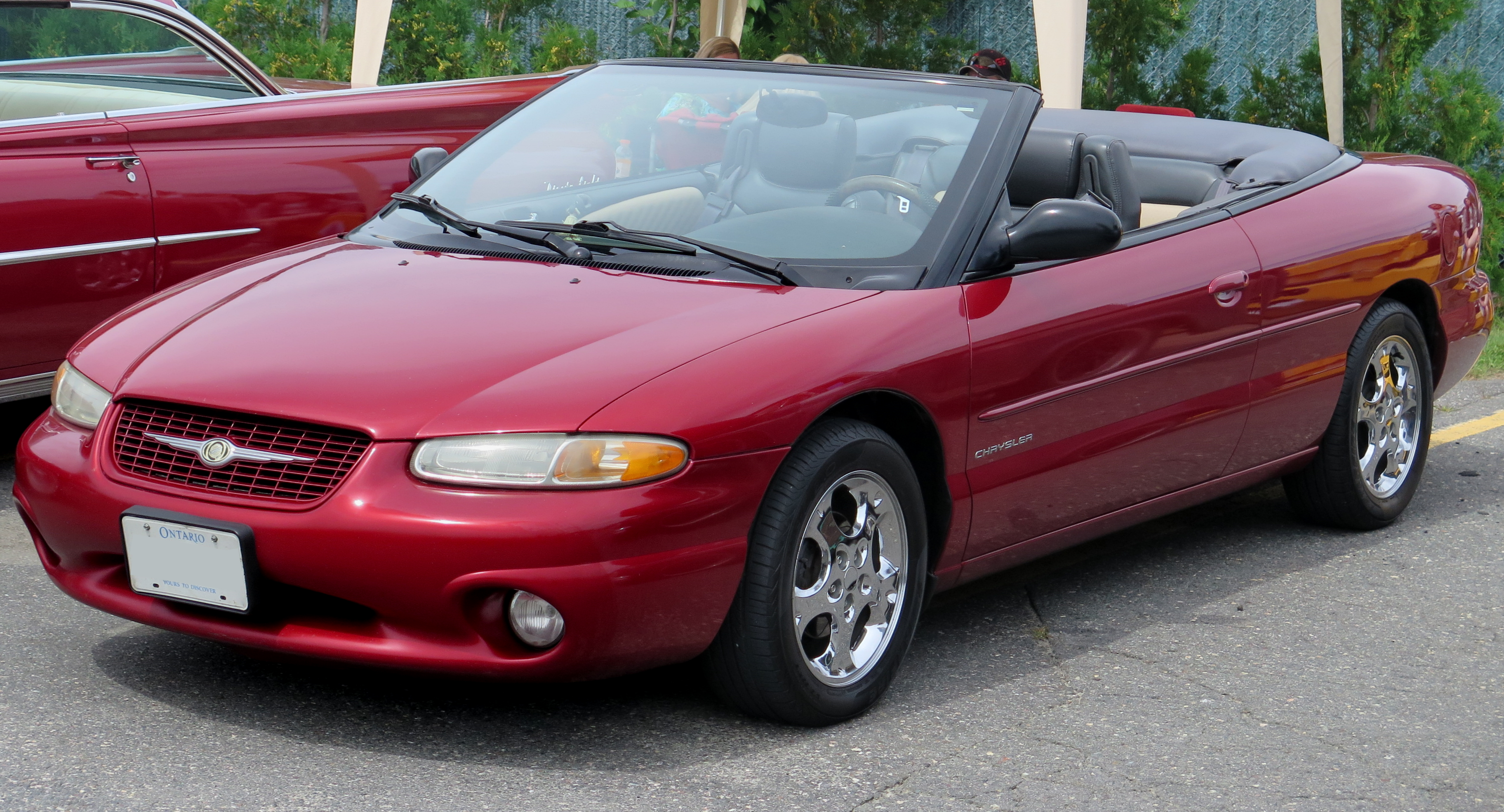

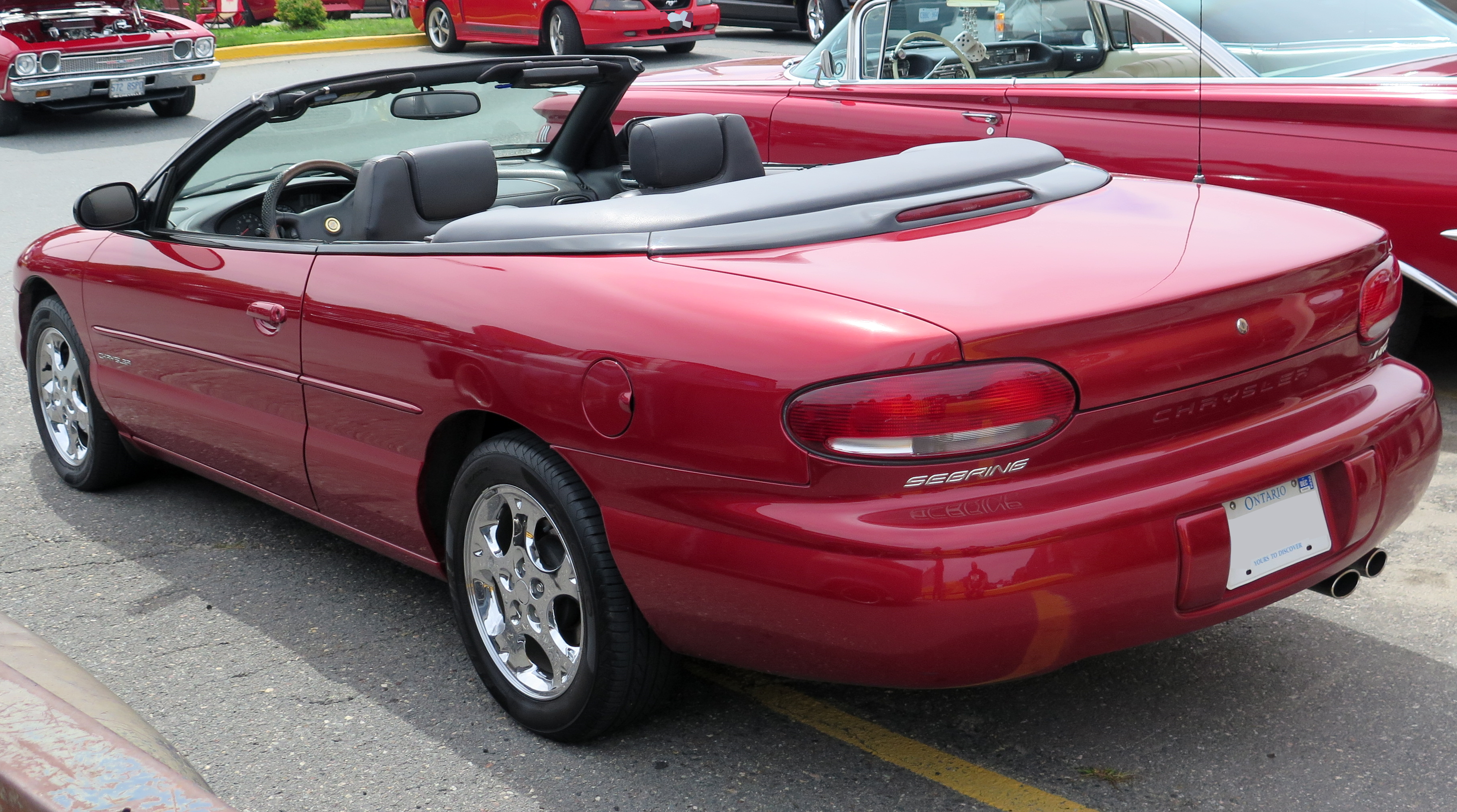
2000 Chrysler Sebring JXi Limited convertible

The Chrysler Sebring convertible was launched in 1996, replacing the LeBaron convertible. The convertible was not based on the coupe, and was instead based on the Chrysler Cirrus sedan, reportedly due to the difficulty of transferring the production technology from Mitsubishi. Both the Cirrus and the Sebring convertible were marketed in Europe as the Stratus.

The first-generation convertible (marketed as the Chrysler Stratus in Mexico and Europe) was assembled in Mexico alongside the Cirrus sedan.

Trim levels:

- JX — 1996–2000
- JXi — 1996–2000
- JXi Limited — 1998–2000

== Second generation (ST-22/JR; 2001) ==
Second generation
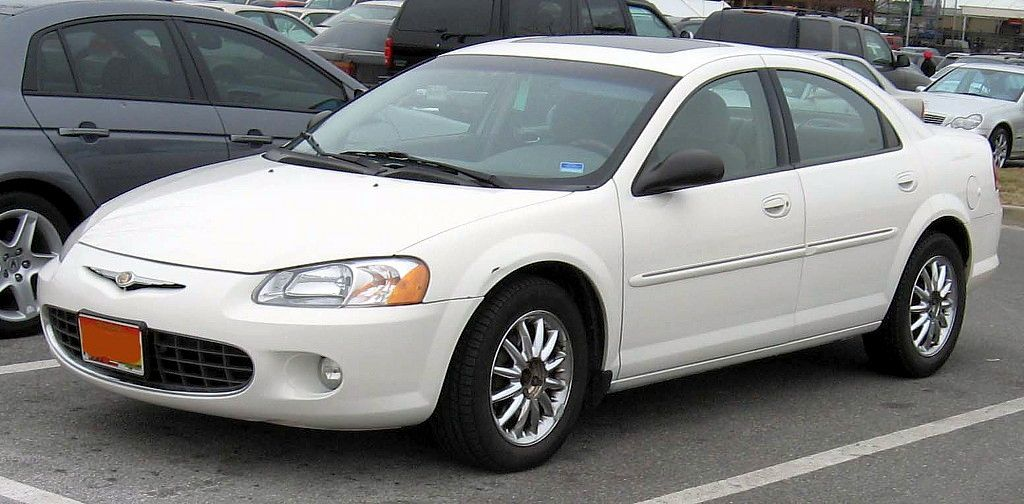
- 2001–2003 Chrysler Sebring sedan

Overview
- Also called: Chrysler Cirrus (in Mexico)
- Production: 2000–2006 (sedan and convertible); 2000–2005 (coupe)
- Model years: 2001–2006 (sedan and convertible); 2001–2005 (coupe)
- Assembly: Sterling Heights, Michigan, United States (sedan and convertible); Normal, Illinois, United States (coupe)

Body and chassis
- Body style: 4-door sedan 2-door coupe 2-door convertible
- Layout: Transverse front-engine, front-wheel drive
- Platform: Sedan & Convertible: Chrysler JR platform Coupe: Chrysler ST-22 platform
- Related: Sedan & Convertible: Dodge Stratus sedan Volga Siber; Coupe: Dodge Stratus coupe Mitsubishi Eclipse

Powertrain
- Engine: gasoline: Sedan & Convertible: 2.4 L EDZ I4; 2.4 L EDV/EDT turbo I4; 2.7 L EER V6 (also E85); Coupe: 2.4 L 4G64 I4; 3.0 L 6G72 V6
- Transmission: Sedan & Convertible: 5-speed manual 4-speed Ultradrive 41TE automatic Coupe: 5-speed manual 4-speed F4A42/F4A51 automatic

Dimensions
- Wheelbase: Sedan: 108.0 in (2,743 mm); Coupe: 103.7 in (2,634 mm); Convertible: 106.0 in (2,692 mm)
- Length: Sedan: 190.7 in (4,844 mm); Coupe: 190.2 in (4,831 mm) (2001–2002); 191.9 in (4,874 mm) (2003–2005); Convertible: 193.7 in (4,920 mm)
- Width: Sedan: 71.9 in (1,826 mm) (2001–2003); 70.6 in (1,793 mm) (2004–2006); Coupe: 70.3 in (1,786 mm) (2001–2002); 69.9 in (1,775 mm) (2003–2005); Convertible: 69.4 in (1,763 mm) (2001–2006)
- Height: Sedan: 54.9 in (1,394 mm); Coupe: 53.7 in (1,364 mm) (2001–2002); 53.9 in (1,369 mm) (2003–2005); Convertible: 55.0 in (1,397 mm) (2001–2006)

Chrysler (then DaimlerChrysler) presented the redesigned Sebring line — a sedan, coupe and convertible — at the 2000 New York Auto Show for model year 2001. The coupe was based on the Mitsubishi Eclipse ST Platform, while the sedan and convertible used the Chrysler JR platform successors to the Chrysler Cirrus.

The 2004 sedan received minor tweaks to its front end: a redesigned grille, reworked headlights, and a Chrysler winged emblem on the rear deck; and the Coupe was discontinued after model year 2005. In Mexico, the Sebring was marketed as the Chrysler Cirrus. Exclusive for the Cirrus was the availability of Chrysler's turbocharged 2.4 L DOHC engine. The Cirrus was available as a sedan and convertible body styles. Models with this engine are identified with a "High Output" badge on the back of the vehicle. Also unique to the Cirrus were the trim levels; the sedan was offered in two while the convertible had only one. All were equipped with an automatic transmission.

The Insurance Institute for Highway Safety gave the 2001–2006 Sebring an Acceptable overall rating in frontal crash tests. In the side impact test, a Poor overall rating was given to models without side airbags. The IIHS did not test the Sebring with side airbags since Chrysler declined another test.

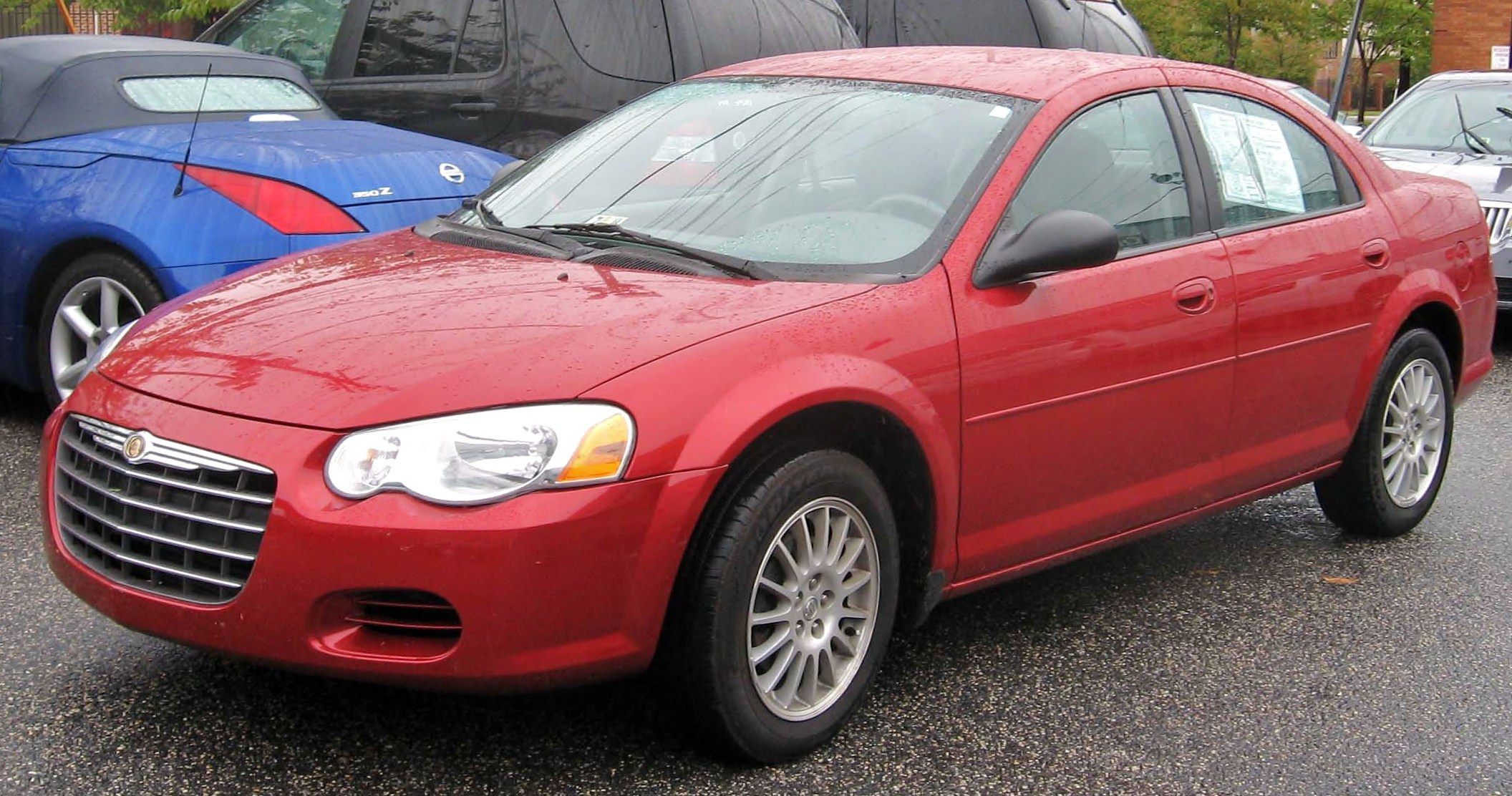
2004-2006 Chrysler Sebring Sedan

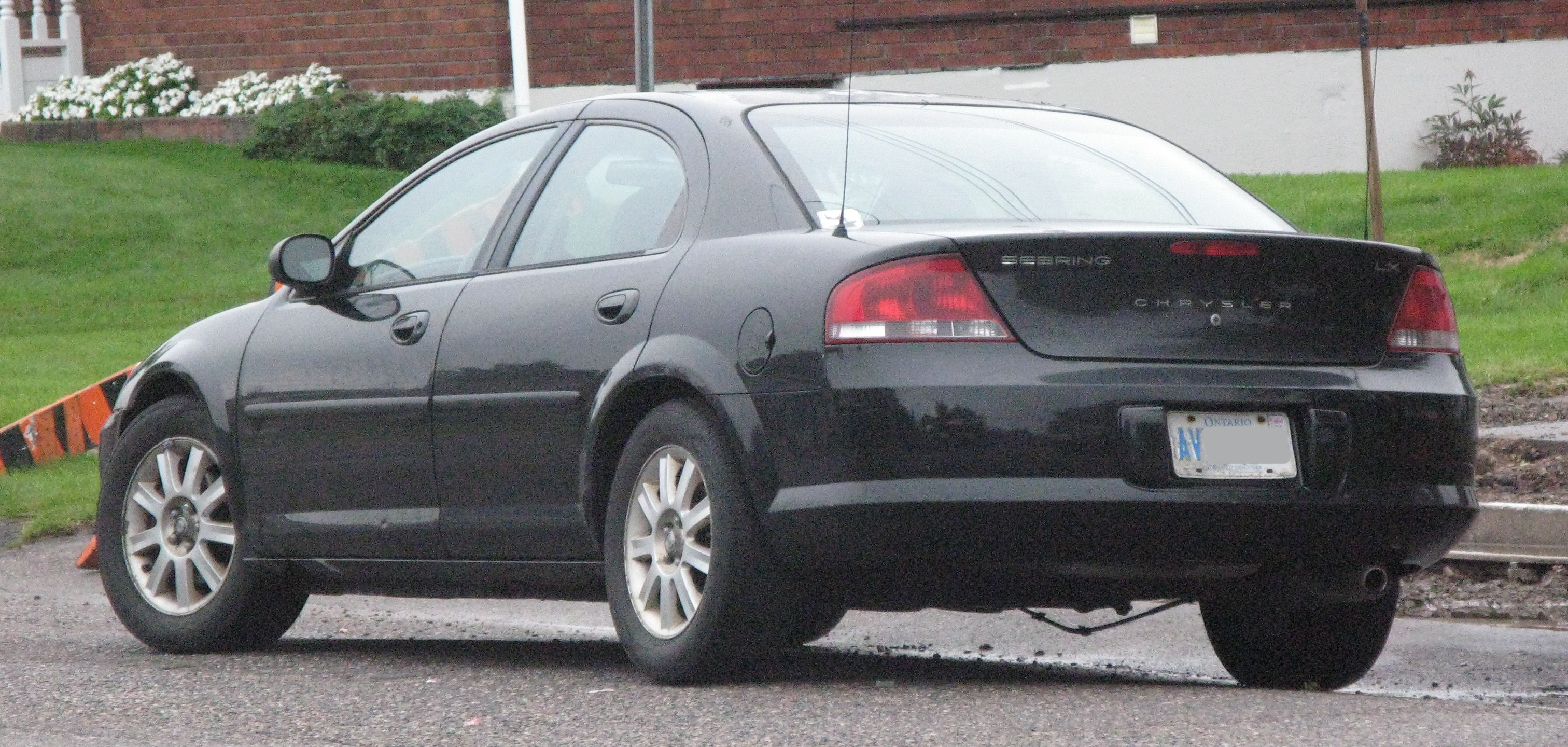
2000-2003 Chrysler Sebring

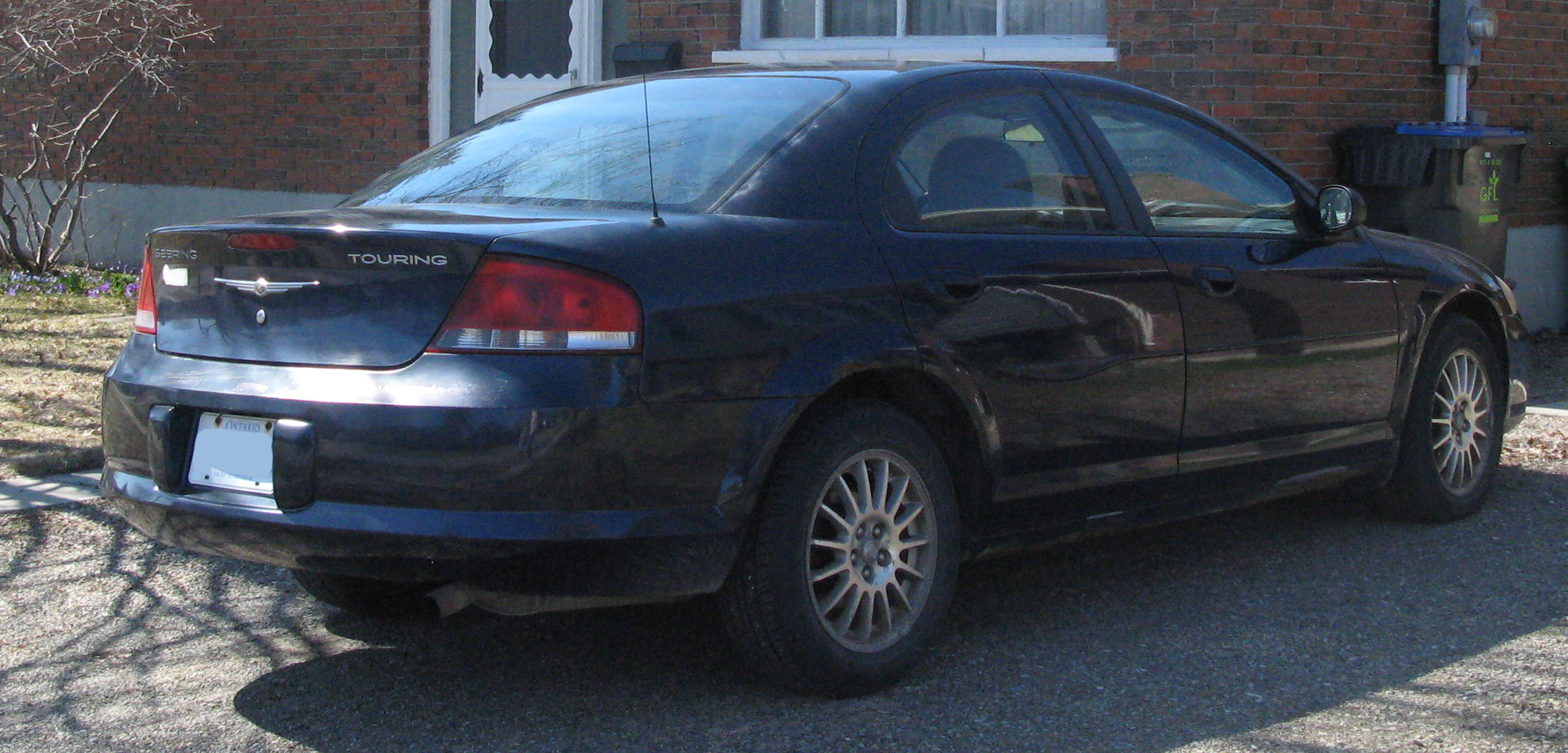
2004-2006 Chrysler Sebring

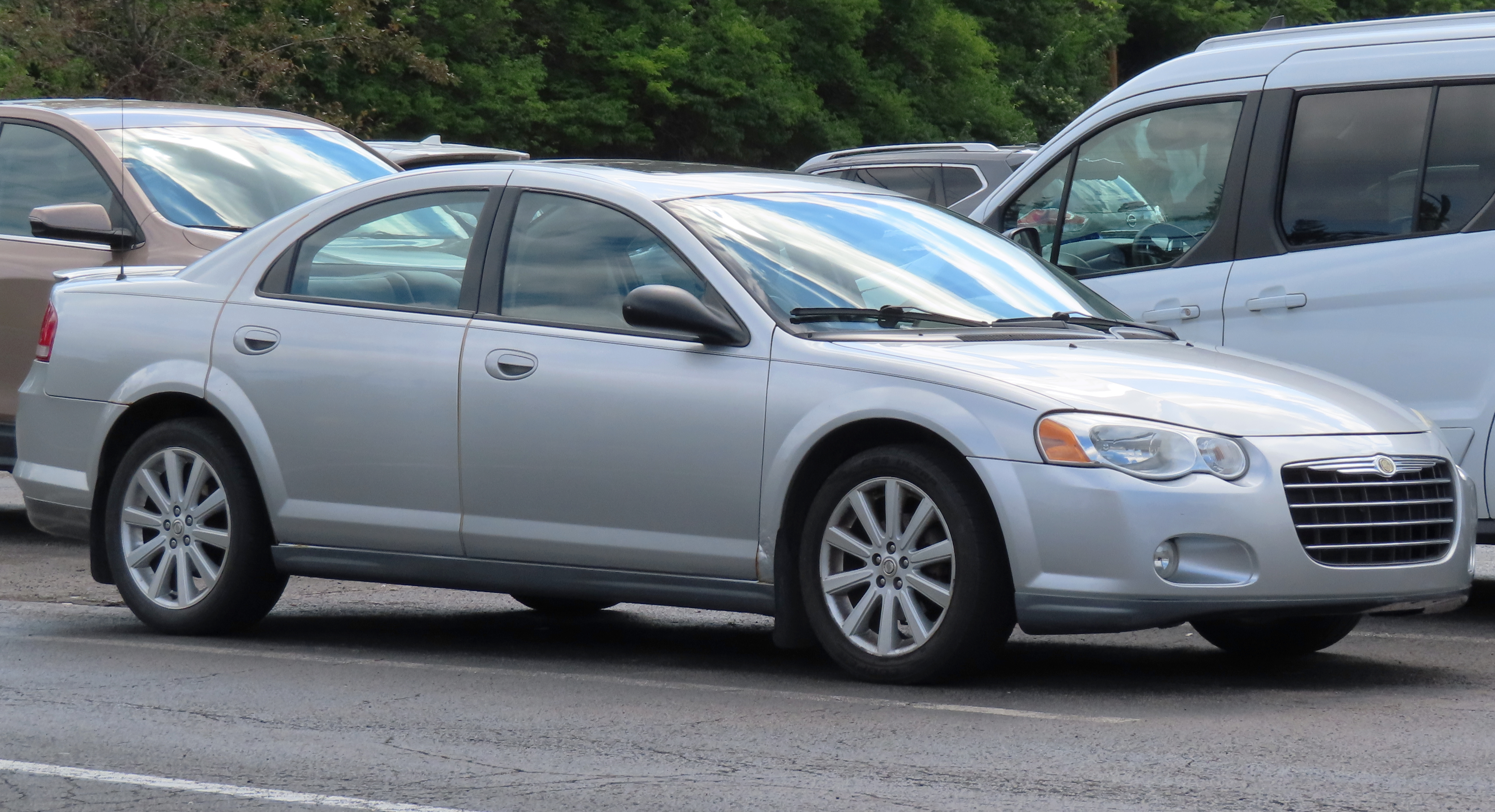
2006 Chrysler Sebring TSi

=== Convertible ===
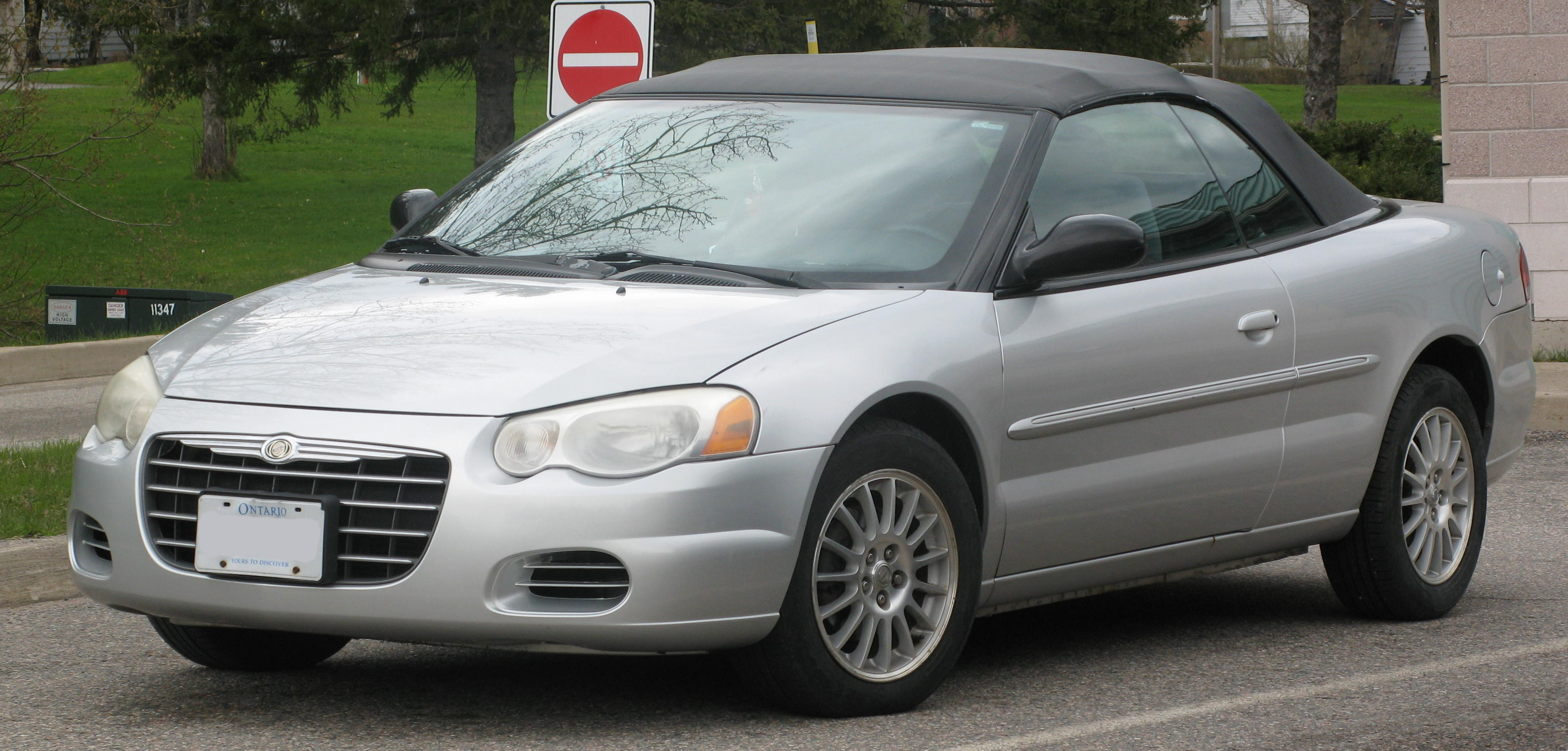
2004–2006 Chrysler Sebring convertible (North America)

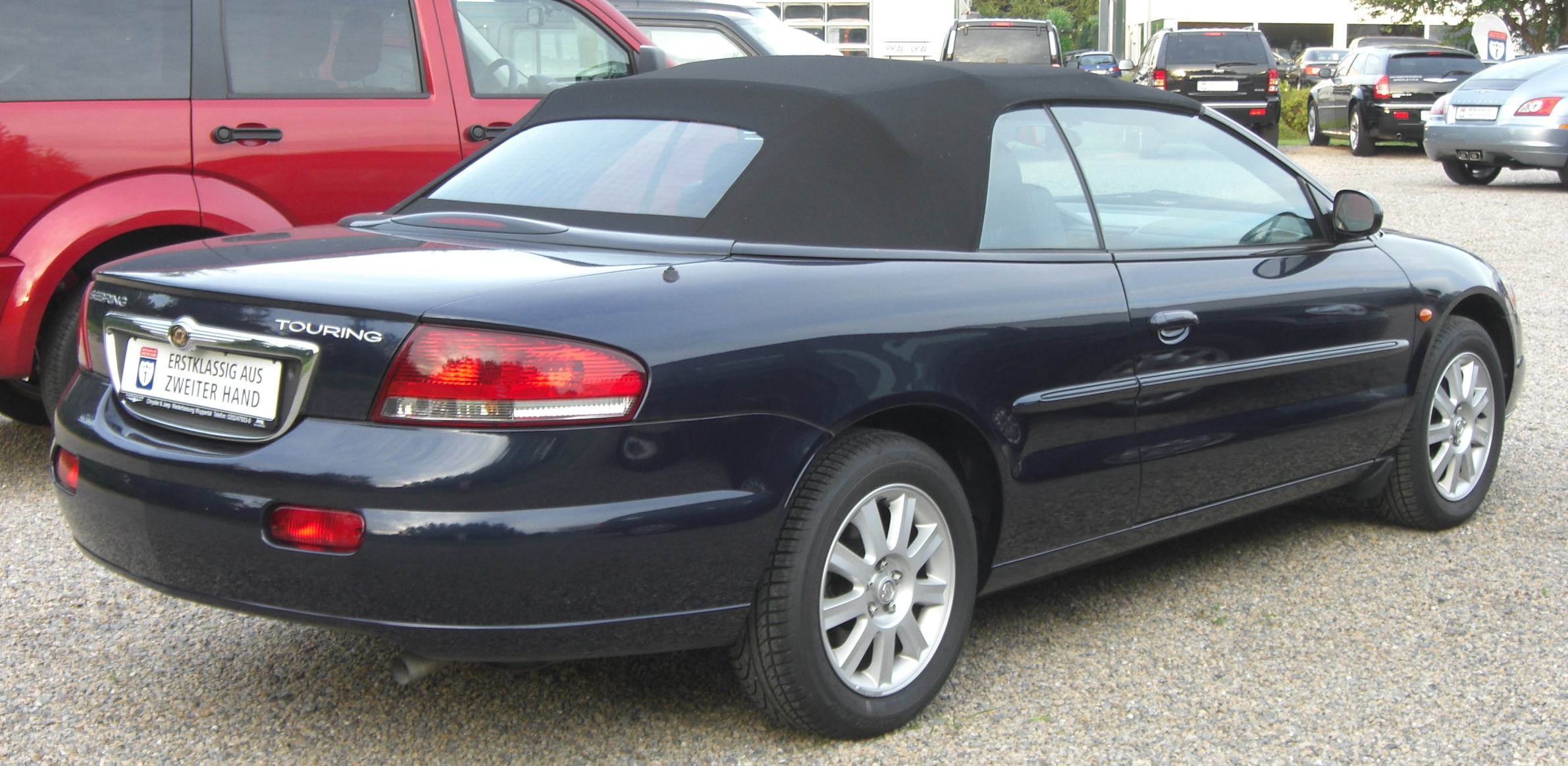
Chrysler Sebring Limited cabriolet (Europe)

For 2001, the Sebring Convertible front end was restyled to resemble the Sebring sedan, and continued to share its platform. Many interior and exterior components were carried over from the first-generation car. The Sebring received minor styling revisions (mostly the appearance of the front end) for the 2004 model year.

The bodywork featured increased structural reinforcement in anticipation of pending crash standards.

=== Coupe ===
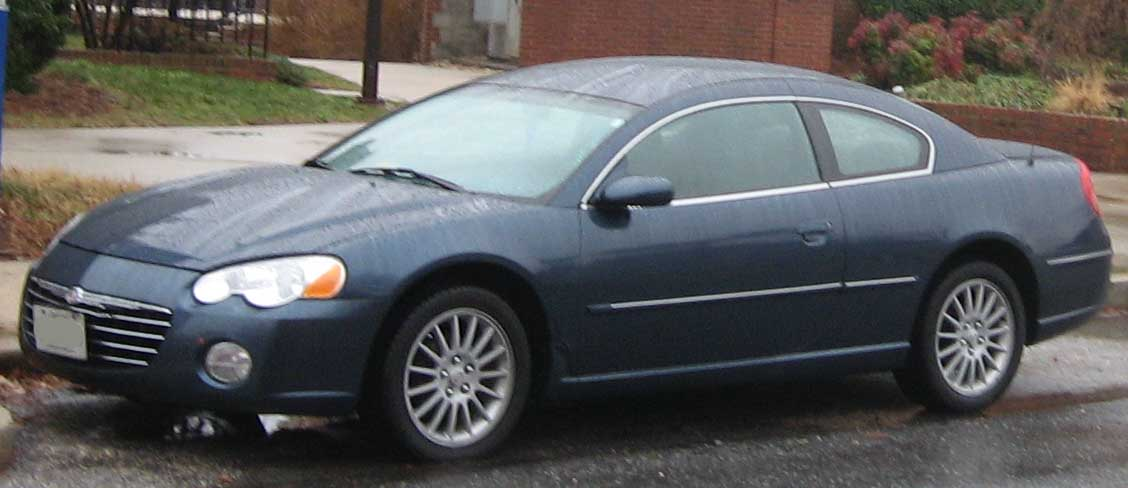
2003–2005 Chrysler Sebring coupe

As with the previous generation, the Coupe departed significantly from the sedan and convertible, alongside which it was marketed.

The second generation Coupe was again styled by Chrysler (then DaimlerChrysler) and engineered and manufactured by Mitsubishi Motors North America in Normal, Illinois — as a restyled variant of the third-generation Mitsubishi Eclipse. Using a variant of the Eclipse's ST platform with a three-inch wheelbase extension, the Coupe was described as, "a Mitsubishi in all but name" by Bredan Saur of Curbside Classic.

Exterior styling cues, primarily an elongated, low grille, served to relate the three body styles, along with detail elements from the Chrysler Concorde and 300M. The Coupe's full instrument panel was shared with the Eclipse. The two-door's body rigidity was increased by 90 percent in bending and 9 percent in torsion compared to the previous generation, and the revised design added a front strut tower brace, and a rigid rear suspension toe link bushing.

Available engines included a 2.4L 147 hp inline SOHC 16 valve four and a SOHC 3.0L 24 valve V-6 making 200 hp (149 kW) at 5,500 rpm and 205 lb⋅ft (278 N⋅m) of torque at 4,500 rpm. Two trim levels were available, LX and LXi. Rear suspension features four wheel double wishbone independent suspension with coils springs and stabilizer bars, front and rear.

Standard features include manual control air conditioning; cruise control; front disc and rear drum brakes; six-speaker stereo; four-speed automatic transmission; tilt steering; power trunk release; power windows, locks and mirrors; 60/40 lockable, split folding rear seats and a 16.3 cubic foot trunk. The LXi trim level includes 17-inch aluminum wheels; traction control; leather seats; rear disc brakes; eight-way power driver's seat; fog lamps; remote keyless entry; compass and temperature display; and a seven-speaker Infinity sound system with cassette and CD. Options include a four-disc, in-dash CD changer, side air bag curtains, ABS and a sunroof that retracts outside, above the roof and not internally. The braking system consists of four wheel disc brakes with optional anti-lock brakes. The bodywork features improved sealing, a double lip/bulb door glass seal, and a comprehensive acoustical package to reduce noises as well as engine intake and exhaust system resonators.

The Sebring Coupe, marketed in Canada for the 2001 model year, received a minor facelift for 2003, and was discontinued after the 2005 model year.

=== European versions ===
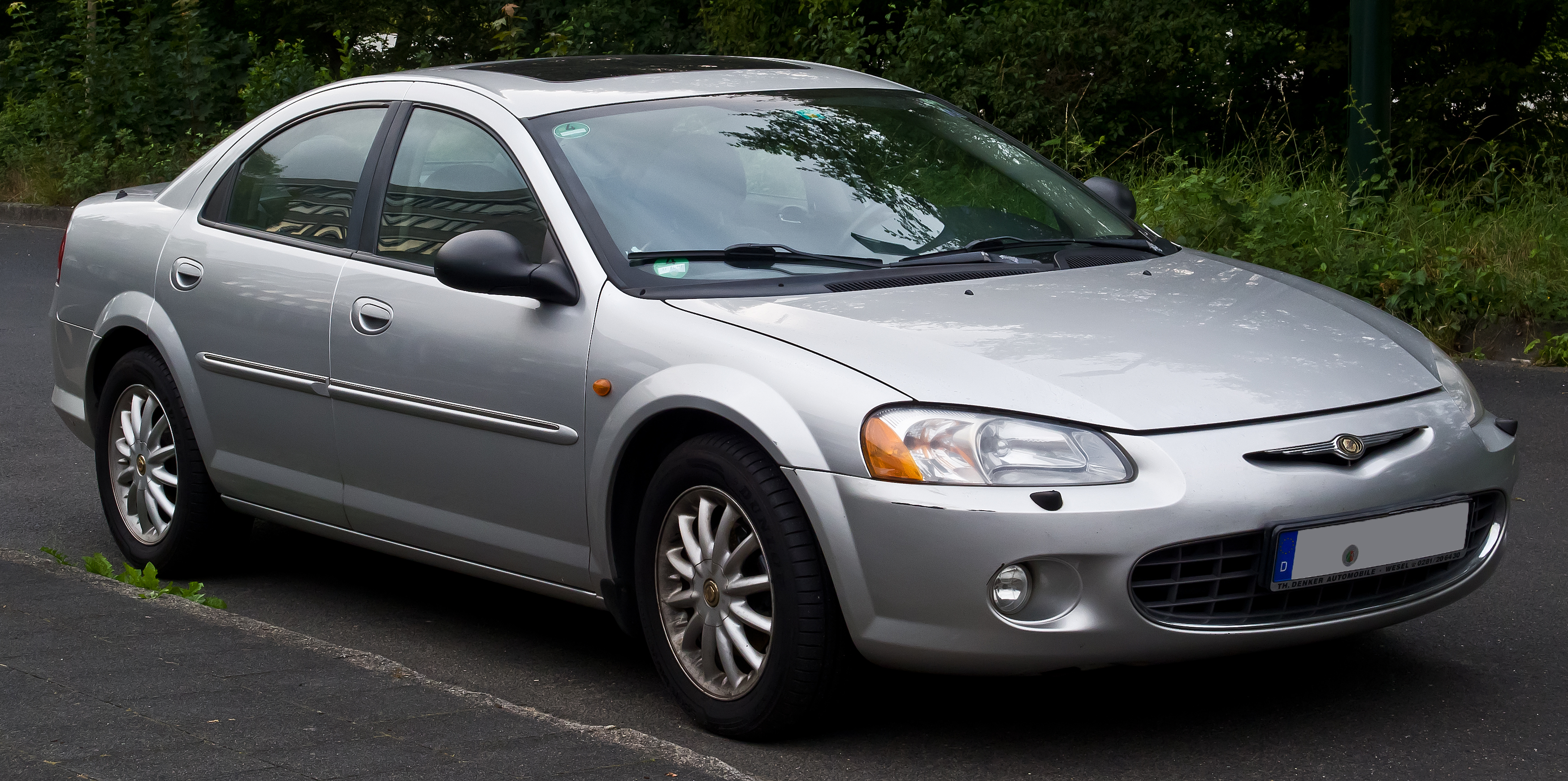
Chrysler Sebring 2.7 LX sedan (European model)

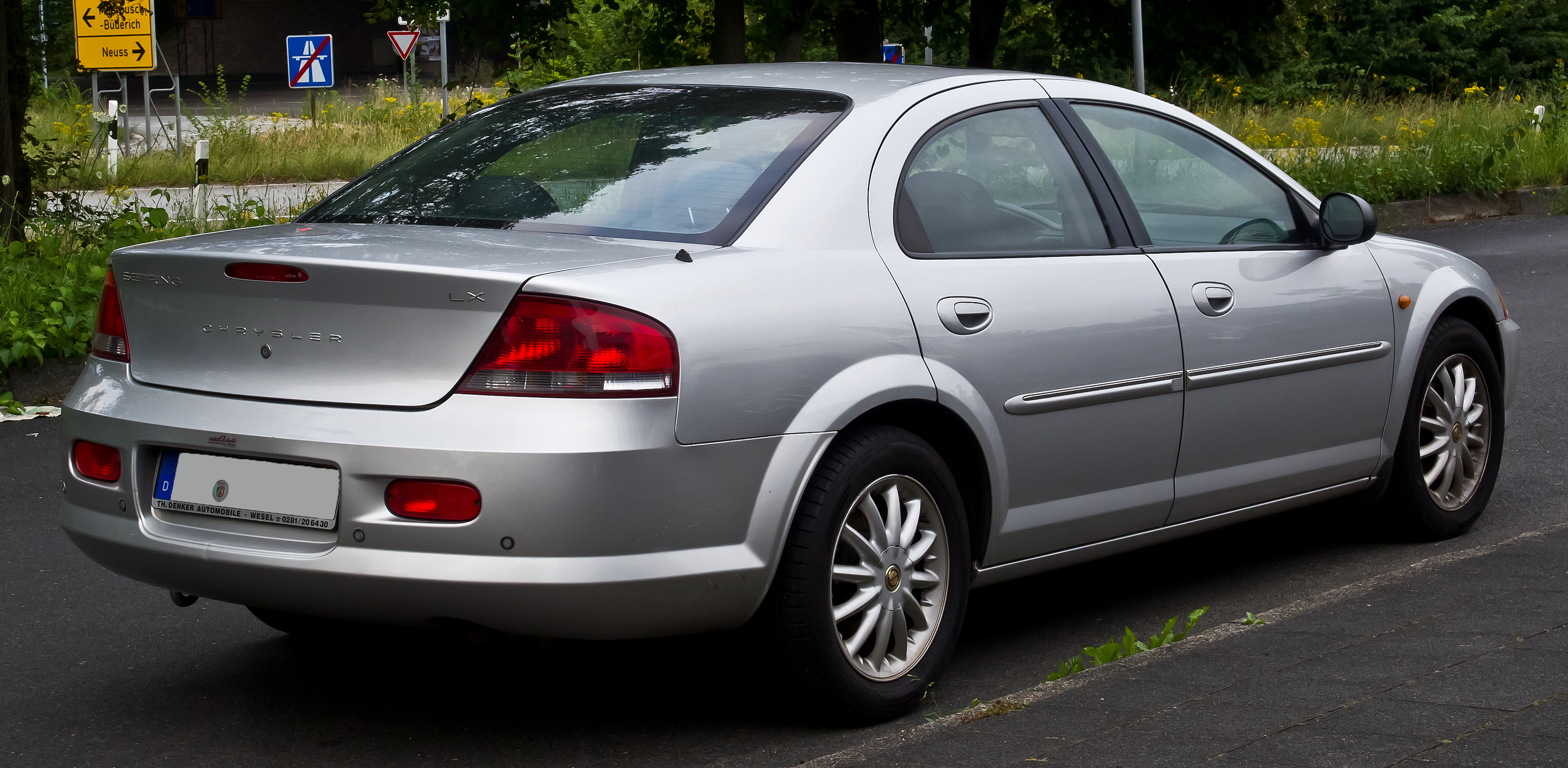
Chrysler Sebring 2.7 LX sedan (European model)

Chrysler also manufactured export versions of the 2001–2006 Sebring sedan and convertible for the mainland European market. Front and rear lights are to European standards, different from the USA & Canada in that turn-signal indicators are orange, with additional side-turn repeaters on the front fenders. The rear bumper has a larger recess for the longer European-size license plates, and two rear fog lamps are fitted; one on each side of the license plate. The LHD headlamps incorporate Euro-type H4 bulbs, together with three-way up and down beam-level adjustment via a dash-mounted switch to the left of the steering wheel. Emissions controls are to the EURO 3 standard; later versions are compliant with EURO 4. Engine ranges offered were the 2.0 L DOHC 16V inline 4-cylinder (later replaced by the 2.4L unit in some countries), and the 2.7 L DOHC 24V 6-cylinder unit. The 2.0 and 2.4L engines are available with the 5-speed manual or four-speed 41TE auto transmission (depending on the country); the six-cylinder engine is automatic only.

The Canadian-market 240 km/h-160 mph speedometer (with km/h predominant) is fitted to the European models. The odometer and trip meter are in kilometers. As the 2001–2006 Sebring sedan and convertible were made in left-hand drive only, they were not sold in the UK and Ireland. Chrysler UK did, however, import 50 convertibles with the 2.7 L engine in 2001/2002, and these were sold through selected dealers. Being non-standard in Chrysler's UK range at the time though, no more were imported.

Trim levels offered in Europe were LE (equivalent to North American market LX) and LX (equivalent to North American market LXi). From 2004, Touring and Limited versions started to replace the LE and LX designations respectively.

The lack of a diesel engine and right-hand drive availability prevented this Sebring from being a true pan-European model unlike other Chryslers such as the Chrysler 300M, PT Cruiser, and Voyager. In addition, the model was dropped from Chrysler's lineup in some countries, notably France, before production ended in 2006. In France, the three domestic car-makers Peugeot, Citroen, and Renault dominate the new car market, which meant very low sales of the Sebring there. As a result, the sedan was only imported by Chrysler France in 2001 and 2002. The 2003 and facelifted 2004–2006 year models were not. The convertible was only sold until 2004. The 2005 and 2006 models were likewise not imported.

=== Trim Levels ===
- Base (sedan and convertible 2004–2006) (coupe 2004–2005)
- GTC (Convertible 2002–2006)
- Limited (sedan 2004–2006) (convertible 2001–2006) (coupe 2004–2005)
- LX (sedan and convertible 2001–2004) (coupe 2001–2003)
- LXi (sedan and convertible 2001–2004) (coupe 2001–2003)
- Touring (sedan and convertible 2004–2006)
- TSi (sedan 2005–2006)

Note: Additional packages could be added to various standard trim levels.

=== Volga Siber ===
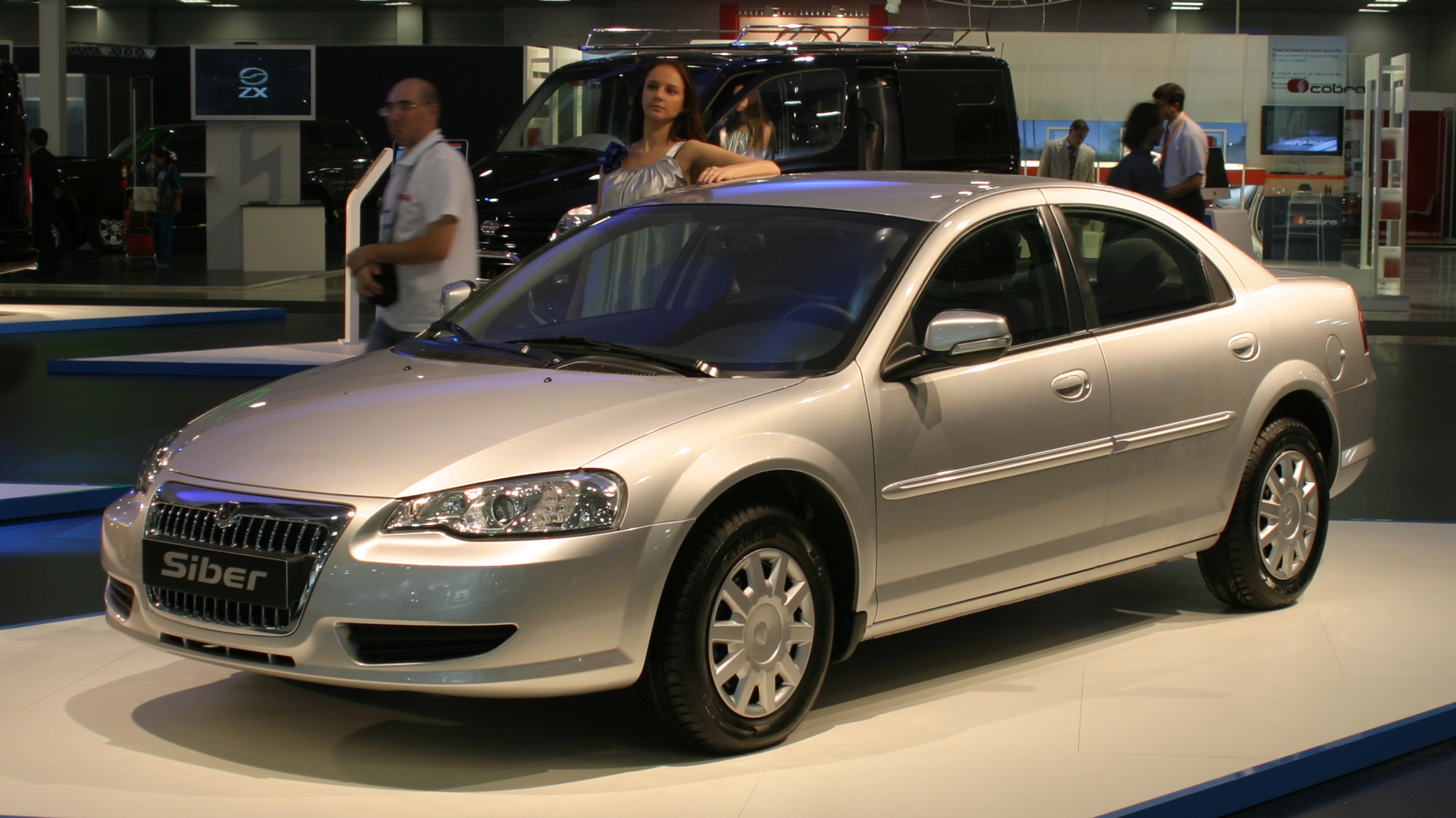
2008 Volga Siber

In 2006, the license, tooling, and assembly line for the second-generation Chrysler Sebring/Dodge Stratus sedan was sold to Russian firm GAZ for about US$151 million (€124 million). After some minor modifications the vehicle was renamed the Volga Siber. It went into production in March 2008 at the Gorky Automobile Plant in Nizhny Novgorod, Russia. However, due to the Great Recession sales were not as expected and production ended in 2010 after 9,000 examples were built.

=== In popular culture ===
• Television: In the American version of the television series The Office, the main character, Michael Scott, drives a silver Chrysler Sebring convertible during the first few seasons—a vehicle that becomes a recurring comedic element in the plot. Additionally, in an episode of the police procedural NCIS, a 2004 Chrysler Sebring sedan involved in a crime is identified by an agent as a Kuruma, in a direct reference to the video game Grand Theft Auto III.

• Video games: Video games: The second-generation Chrysler Sebring served as the primary inspiration for the design of several fictional vehicles in the Grand Theft Auto franchise, developed by Rockstar Games. In Grand Theft Auto III (2001), the Kuruma sedan—the first car driven by the protagonist during the opening mission, "Give Me Liberty"—draws its key design cues from this model. Subsequently, in the newly released Grand Theft Auto VI (2026), the fictional brand Bravado introduced the Bogan sedan, the design of which is based directly on the second-generation Chrysler Sebring and its sibling model, the Dodge Stratus.

== Third generation (JS; 2007) ==
Third generation
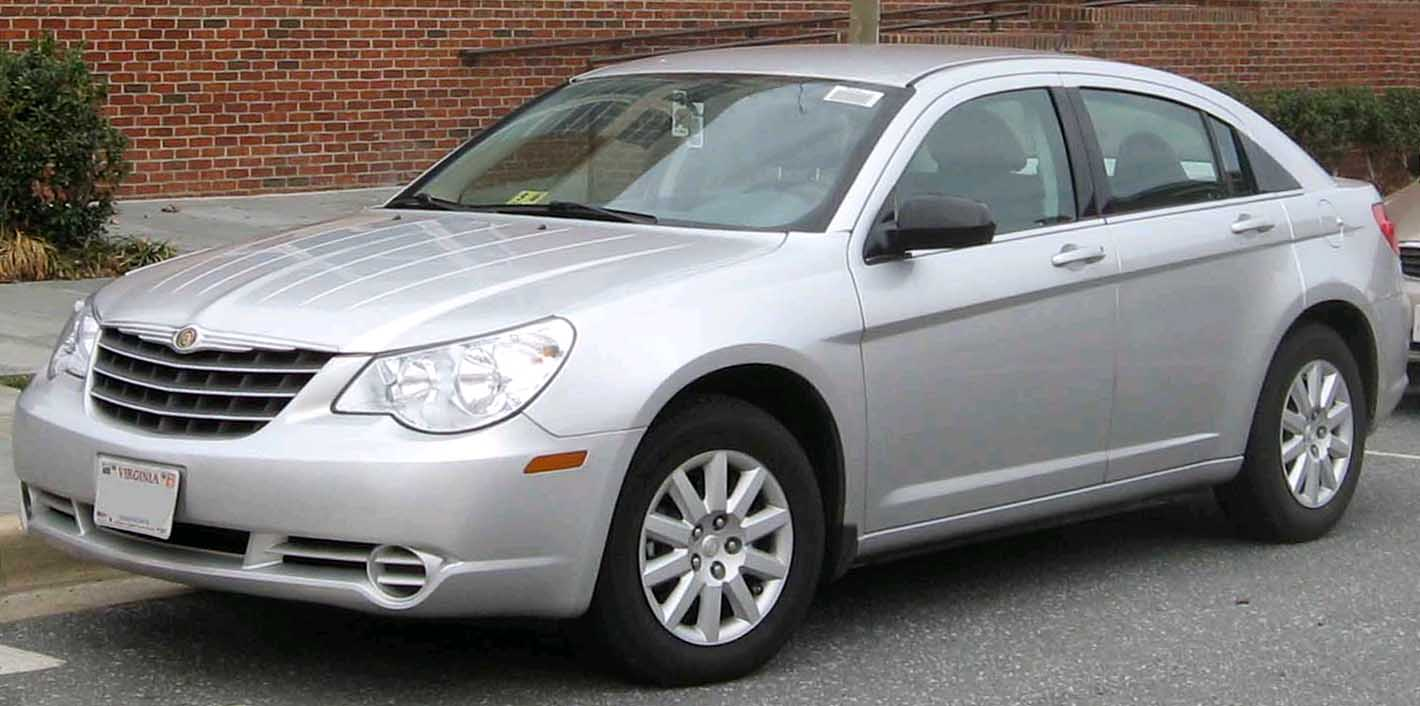
- 2007–2008 Chrysler Sebring sedan

Overview
- Production: 2006–2010
- Model years: 2007–2010 (sedan); 2008–2010 (convertible)
- Assembly: Sterling Heights, Michigan, United States; Beijing, China (Beijing Benz)

Body and chassis
- Body style: 4-door sedan 2-door convertible
- Layout: Front-engine, front-wheel drive / all-wheel drive
- Platform: Chrysler JS platform
- Related: Chrysler 200; Dodge Avenger; Dodge Journey

Powertrain
- Engine: gasoline: 2.0 L World I4; 2.4 L World I4; 2.7 L EER V6 (also E85); 3.5 L EGF SOHC V6; diesel: 2.0 L EA188 CRD PD I4
- Transmission: 4-speed Ultradrive 40TES automatic; 4-speed Ultradrive 41TES automatic; 5-speed Magna T355 manual; 6-speed Ultradrive 62TE automatic; 6-speed Getrag Mps6 DCT automatic; 6-speed Aisin BG6 manual

Dimensions
- Wheelbase: 108.9 in (2,766 mm)
- Length: 190.6 in (4,841 mm) (sedan); 193.8 in (4,923 mm) (convertible)
- Width: 71.2 in (1,808 mm) (sedan); 71.5 in (1,816 mm) (convertible)
- Height: 59.0 in (1,499 mm) (sedan); 58.5 in (1,486 mm) (convertible)

The Sebring was replaced with a new model based on the JS platform for the 2007 model year. The third-generation Sebring was assembled in Sterling Heights, Michigan, containing over 82% of parts sourced in North America. Since no 2007 convertible was offered, the 2006 Sebring convertible was left to fill the void, remaining in showrooms and on the company's website until the 2008 model's release. The Sebring sedan and convertible were also sold in right-hand drive through Chrysler's UK and Ireland dealer network.

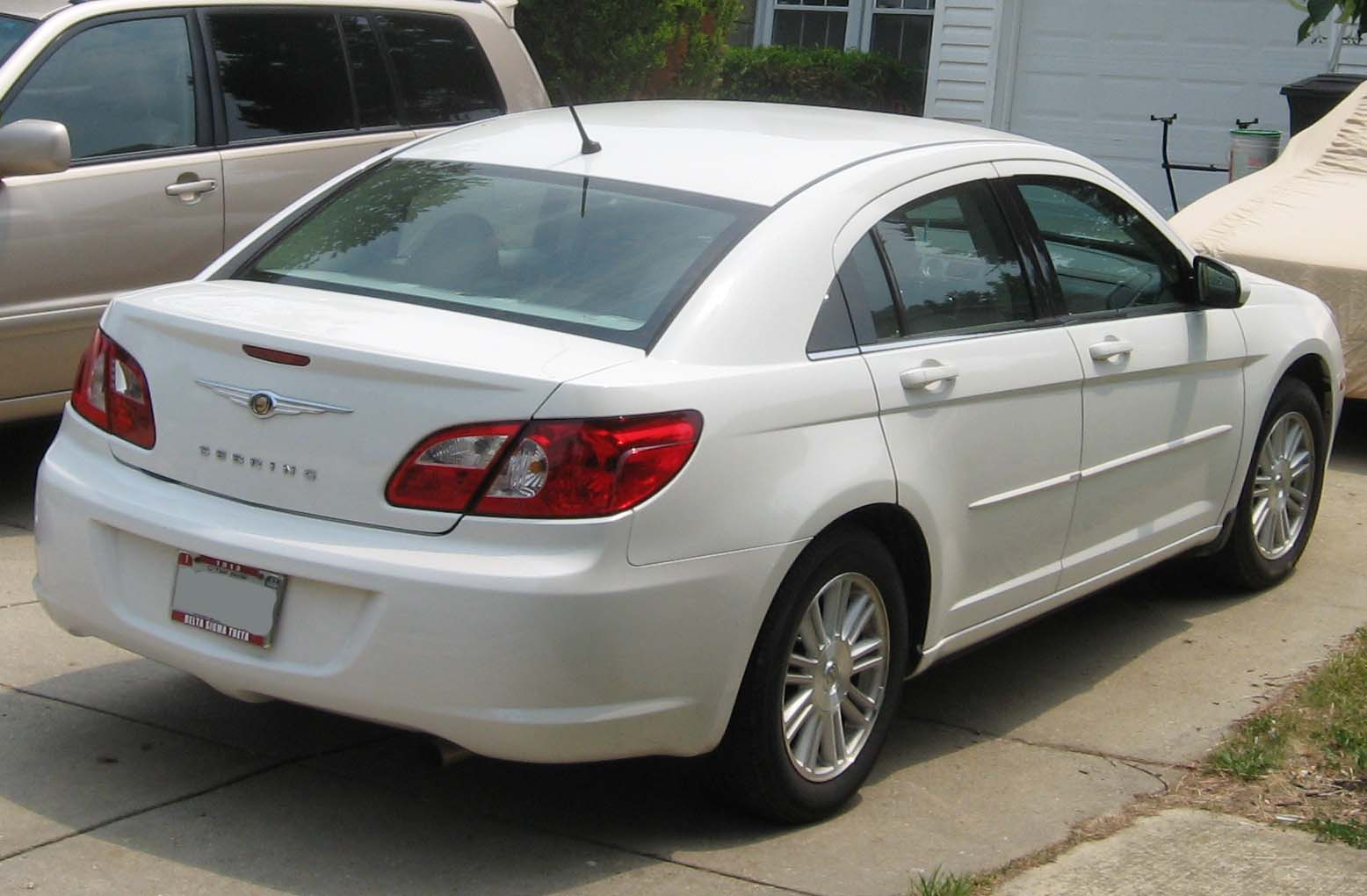
2007 Chrysler Sebring sedan

Chrysler offered three engines for the 2007 Sebring; the 2,360 cc (2.36 L; 144 cu in) GEMA I4, the 2,736 cc (2.736 L; 167.0 cu in) EER V6, and the 3,518 cc (3.518 L; 214.7 cu in) EGF V6. The 3.5 L V6 is coupled to Chrysler's first ever six-speed automatic transmission, which employs Autostick technology, and the 2.7 L V6 is capable of running on cleaner-burning E85. Export vehicles will be offered with a 2.0 L turbocharged PDTDI (pumpe düse) diesel made by Volkswagen and the 2.0 L GEMA engine. The 3.5 L V6 sedan is available with all-wheel drive as an extra cost option for 2008 only.

Trim levels:

- base — 2007
- LX — 2008 (replaced base)
- Touring — (2007–2010)
- Limited AWD — (2008)
- Limited — (2007–2010)

In 2008, the optional MyGIG Multimedia Infotainment System became available. In addition, the Limited received the 2.4 L four-cylinder engine and was priced at the same level as the 2008 Touring model. Also for 2009, the rear badge placements were modified. For the model 2010 year, the hood was redesigned, eliminating the longitudinal grooves. The IIHS gave the 2010 Models a G for good in the frontal crash test, the side impact test, and the roof strength test, giving the 2010 Sebring a Top Safety Pick.

In South Korean market, it was sold from March 2007 to 2010.

=== Convertible ===
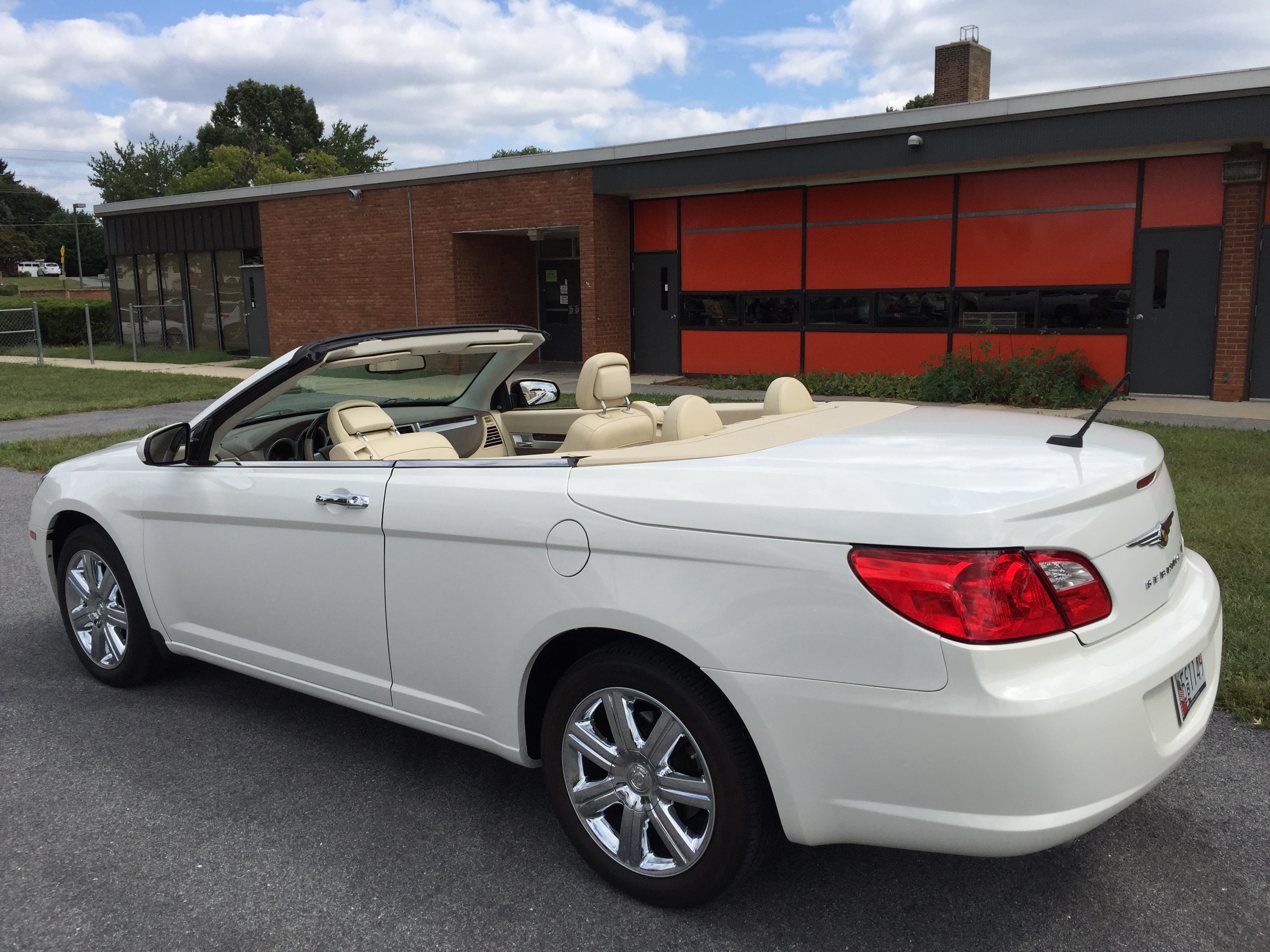
2008–2010 Chrysler Sebring

For the 2008 model year, the Sebring convertible was redesigned with hood strakes recalling the Chrysler Crossfire. The new convertible body style debuted at the 2007 Los Angeles International Auto Show as an early-2008 model. It was the second bestselling four-place open-top cars in the United States, trailing only the Ford Mustang convertible.

The new convertible offered both a retractable hardtop and soft tops, with the Sebring's roofs manufactured by Karmann. A vinyl top came on the base LX model, a cloth roof on the Touring and Limited models with the option of a retractable metal top. The convertible top retracts into the trunk with a power tonneau cover and a luggage protector for the top. The top can also be retracted with the remote keyless entry, meaning the top can be stowed without being inside the car or starting the engine.

The LX model included a new 2.4 L I4 engine, the Touring version came with a retuned version of the 2.7 L V6, while the Limited featured a new 3.5 L V6. Unlike the Sebring sedan, the convertible was not available in all-wheel drive.

=== Chinese versions ===
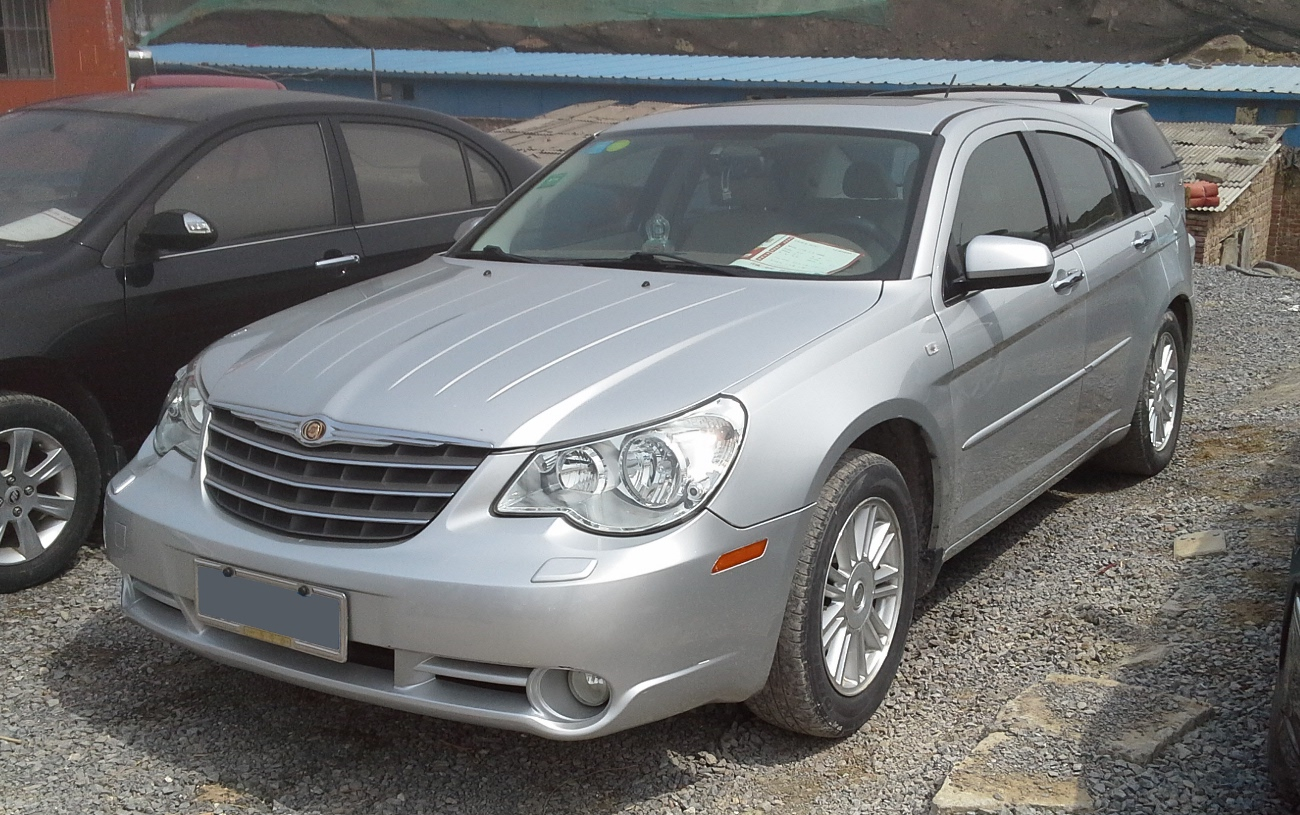
Chrysler Sebring JS

Production of the Chrysler Sebring sedan for the China market began in 2007 at the Beijing-Benz DaimlerChrysler Automotive Co. (BBDC) in Beijing. BBDC is a joint venture between the Beijing Automotive Industry Holding and Chrysler.

Production of the Sebring leveraged assembly capacity for the new BBDC plant which also built the Chrysler 300C, the Mercedes-Benz E-Class, and Mitsubishi Outlander.

Four-cylinder World Engines for the Sebring were built at the Global Engine Manufacturing Alliance (GEMA) plant in Dundee, Michigan for export to China. GEMA began as a joint venture of Chrysler, Mitsubishi, and Hyundai. Since 2009, GEMA is wholly owned by Chrysler.

=== European version ===
Chrysler introduced this generation Sebring in the European markets (including right-hand drive markets) as their first competitor in the D-segment. It received a generally unfavorable reception from European motoring journalists.

=== European reviews ===
- Auto Express
- Caradisiac
- Honest John
- MSN Cars
- Parker's
- Verdict On Cars
- Wise Buyer's

=== Mid-cycle refresh and replacement ===
The Chrysler Sebring was extensively refreshed in 2010, but was rebadged as the Chrysler 200. The JS platform and bodyshell had been retained, but there were extensive cosmetic and powertrain changes to the vehicle. The name change helped distance the vehicle from the Sebring's reputation for quality issues and fleet pervasiveness.

== Total U.S. sales ==
Calendar Year	Sales
2007	93,130
2008	71,663
2009	27,460
2010	38,330
2011	2,380
Total	232,963
