= Dodge Stratus =

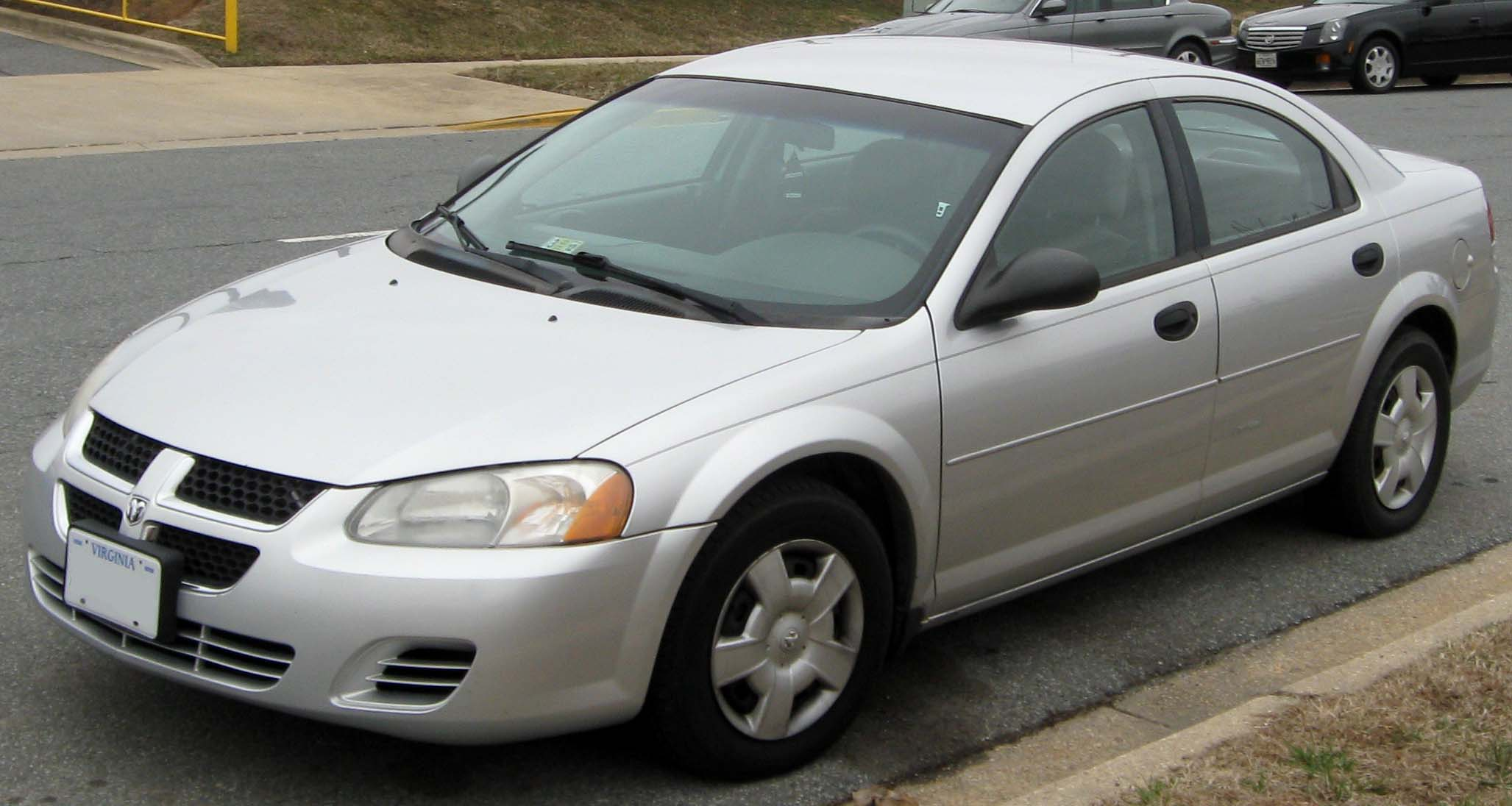

Overview
- Manufacturer: Chrysler Corporation (1995–1998); DaimlerChrysler (1998–2006); Mitsubishi Motors (coupes only)
- Also called: Chrysler Stratus (Europe, Brazil, South Korea and Argentina, 1995–2000)
- Production: June 1994–2006 (sedan); 2000–2005 (coupe)
- Model years: 1995–2006 (sedan); 2001–2005 (coupe)

Body and chassis
- Class: Midsize car
- Layout: Transverse front-engine, front-wheel drive

Chronology
- Predecessor: Dodge Spirit & Dodge Dynasty (sedan); Dodge Avenger (coupe); Dodge 2000GTX
- Successor: Dodge Avenger (sedan); Chrysler Sebring (Europe, Brazil, Argentina and South Korea)

The Dodge Stratus is a mid-size car introduced by Dodge and Chrysler in December 1994, built on the four-door sedan Chrysler JA platform. Immediately recognized for its design and performance, the Stratus, alongside its platform mates, the Plymouth Breeze and Chrysler Cirrus, gained Car and Driver magazine's "Ten Best list" for 1996 and 1997. While initial critical acclaim was high, its ratings eventually declined.

An updated version was introduced for the 2001 model year when the Cirrus was rebranded as the Chrysler Sebring, and a coupe body style was added to the lineup. Production of the Stratus and Sebring models at the Sterling Heights Assembly Plant ceased in early 2006 after 1,308,123 Stratus and Chrysler Sebring sedan and convertible models were built since 2000.

The Dodge Avenger replaced the Stratus nameplate in early 2007 for the 2008 model year. After the Stratus sedan's discontinuation, Chrysler sold its assembly line and tooling to the Russian concern GAZ, which produced almost 9,000 slightly modified units as the GAZ Volga Siber from 2008 until 2010.

== First generation (1995–2000) ==
First generation
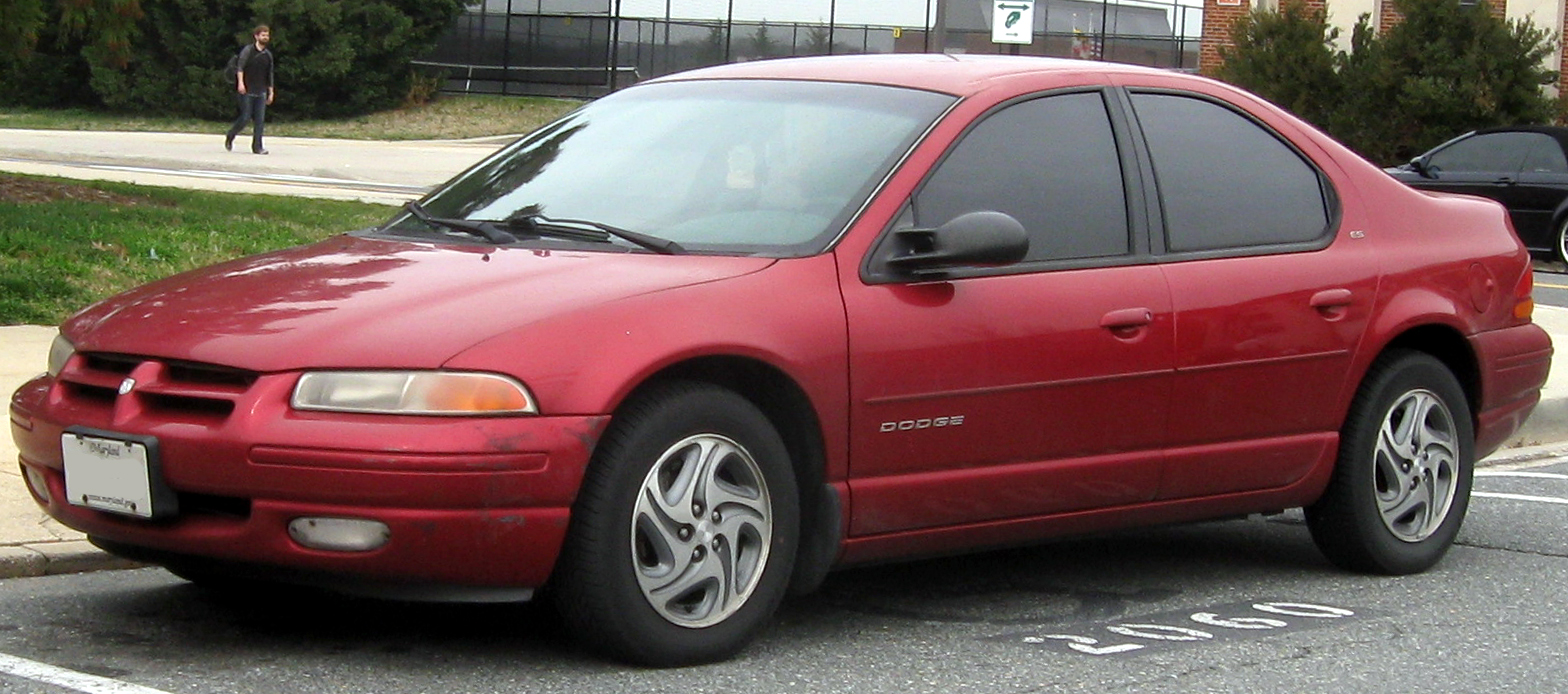

Overview
- Production: June 1994–2000
- Assembly: United States: Sterling Heights, Michigan (Sterling Heights Assembly)
- Designer: Michael Santoro (1992)

Body and chassis
- Body style: 4-door sedan
- Platform: Chrysler JA platform
- Related: Chrysler Cirrus; Chrysler Sebring convertible Plymouth Breeze

Powertrain
- Engine: 2.0 L A588 I4; 2.4 L EDZ/EY7 I4; 2.4 L EDV/EDT turbo I4; 2.5 L Mitsubishi 6G73 V6
- Transmission: 5-speed manual 4-speed Ultradrive 41TE automatic

Dimensions
- Wheelbase: 108 in (2,743 mm)
- Length: 186 in (4,724 mm)
- Width: 71.7 in (1,821 mm)
- Height: 1995–98 Base: 54.2 in (1,377 mm); 1999–2000 Base: 54.2 in (1,377 mm); 1995–97 ES: 52.4 in (1,331 mm); 1998–2000 ES: 54.4 in (1,382 mm)

The Dodge Stratus was introduced in December 1994 for the 1995 model year as the mid-range offering within Chrysler's innovative JA platform, a trio of "cab-forward" design sedans. It was positioned between the more luxurious Chrysler Cirrus and the value-oriented Plymouth Breeze.

Upon its debut, the first-generation Dodge Stratus was available in two trim levels: the base model, later named the SE in 2000, and the sportier ES trim. The base model came standard with a 2.0 L SOHC (Single Overhead Camshaft) I4 engine, with a 2.4 L DOHC (Double Overhead Camshaft) I4 engine available as an option. For the ES trim, the 2.0 L engine was standard from 1995 through 1997, with the 2.4 L DOHC and a 2.5 L SOHC V6 engine offered as optional upgrades. In 1998, the 2.4 L DOHC became standard on the ES, while the 2.5 L V6 remained optional. From 1999 until the end of the first generation in 2000, the 2.5 L V6 was the sole engine option for the ES model.

The Stratus was designed to replace the high-volume Spirit and Dynasty (United States market only). It received favorable reviews upon its launch, though its sales figures did not always match its critical acclaim. Automotive publications, including Consumer Reports, frequently compared the Stratus to other compact-to-mid-size sedans of its era, such as the fifth generation Chevrolet Malibu, and often praised its interior roominess, noting it was more spacious than competitors like the 1995 Ford Contour.

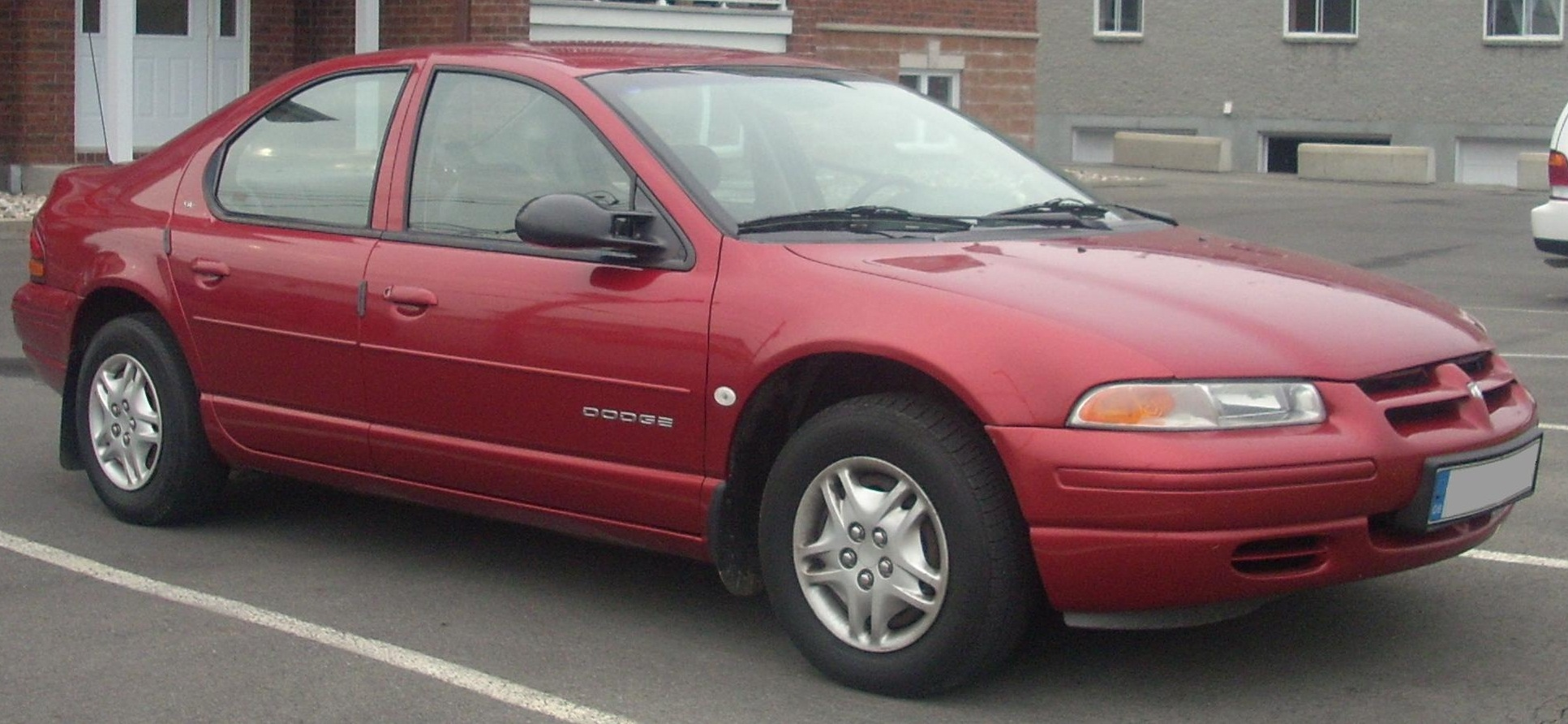
Front of Stratus SE

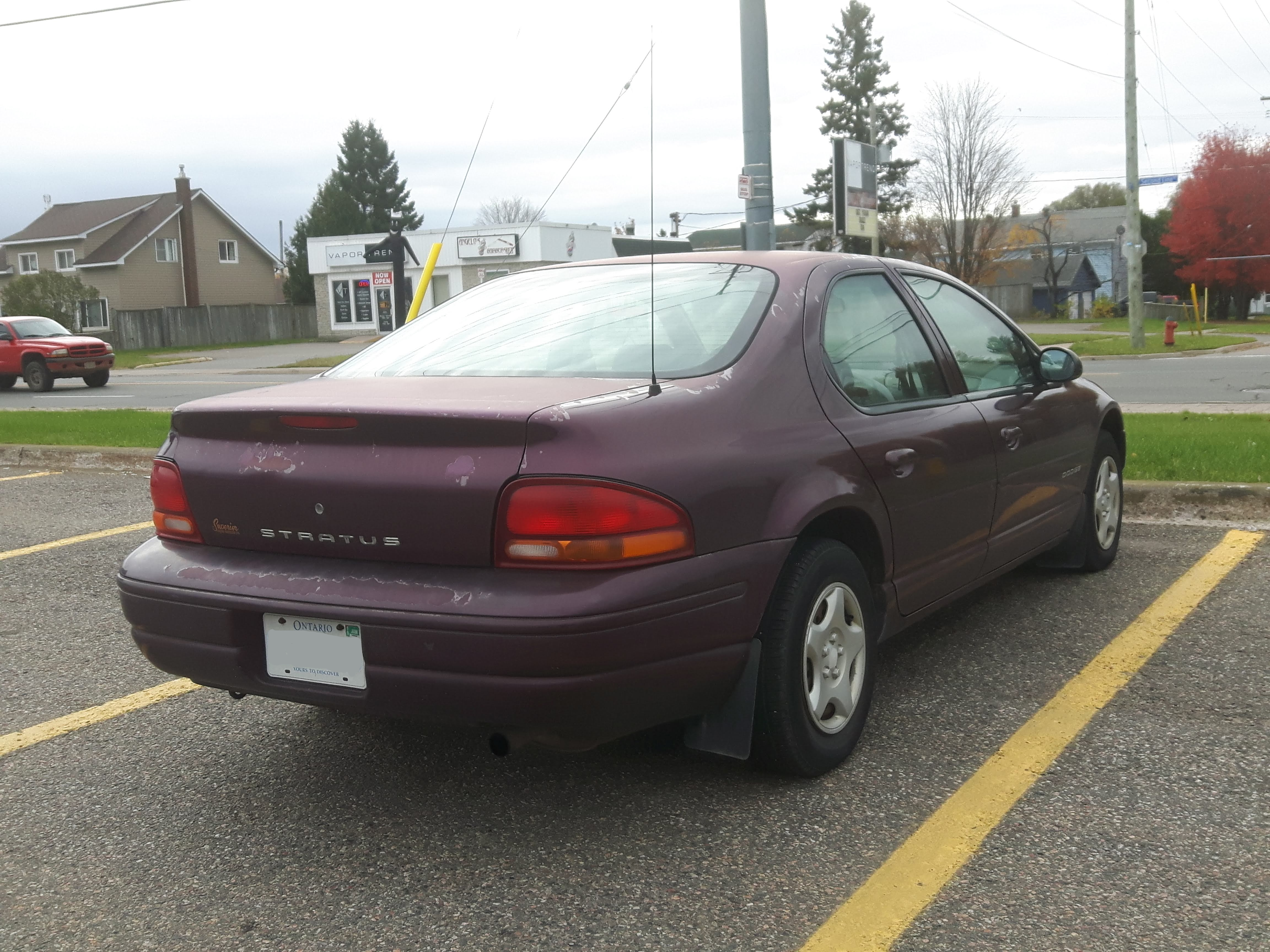
Rear of Stratus

A characteristic of the JA platform was the high degree of interchangeability among the Stratus, Cirrus, and Breeze models. While their exteriors were broadly similar, brand differentiation was achieved through distinct front fascias (headlights and grille designs, often mirroring their respective brand's minivan offerings), unique rear bumpers, taillight designs, and wheel options. The interiors, however, were nearly identical across the three models, with the most noticeable variations being the branding on the steering wheel and a limited number of trim-specific options.

All three JA variants offered a comprehensive array of standard features and available options, aiming to provide value for customers. These included:

- A four-speed automatic transmission, with an optional semi-automatic "Autostick" feature, available on the Stratus and Cirrus (but not the Plymouth Breeze).
- Four-wheel independent suspension, featuring a double wishbone setup in the front and a multi-link rear, contributes to the platform's praised handling characteristics.
- Anti-lock brakes (ABS).
- Convenience features include a tilt steering wheel, cruise control, power windows, power door locks, and an optional power driver's seat.

Available luxury options included leather seating, a power antenna, a six-CD changer, a sunroof, remote keyless entry, and an anti-theft system. A five-speed manual transmission was offered exclusively with the 2.0 L inline-four engine. The 2.4 L engine was not paired with a manual transmission, reportedly due to concerns over its high torque potentially causing excessive wheelspin and drivability issues when combined with a manual gearbox.

=== Markets ===
The first-generation Dodge Stratus had an international presence, adapting its branding, features, and even powertrain options to suit various global markets.

In Canada, the Stratus was available for its final year of sales in 2000. Following this, the Chrysler Sebring — the higher-end counterpart on the JA platform — assumed the sole lower-mid-size sedan offered by Chrysler in the Canadian market, with Dodge not selling a direct equivalent.

A variant sold exclusively in Mexico was a turbocharged version of the 2.4 L DOHC I4 engine. Paired with a four-speed automatic transmission featuring Autostick manual control, this engine delivered 168 hp (125 kW; 170 PS) at 5,200 rpm and 216 lb⋅ft (293 N⋅m) of torque at 2,200 rpm.

Across Europe, the Stratus was marketed under the Chrysler Stratus nameplate, as the Dodge brand was generally reserved for commercial vehicles in that region. Its styling closely resembled the Chrysler Cirrus, featuring chrome accent moldings along the doors and bumpers. It incorporated the Dodge Stratus's distinctive rear taillights and a unique Dodge-style grille, differentiating it from the Cirrus and Plymouth Breeze models.

The Chrysler Stratus also found its way onto racetracks, competing in the Swedish Touring Car Championship. A Dodge-branded model similarly participated in the North American Touring Car Championship, where it was one of the few professional teams in the short-lived series, with driver David Donohue winning the 1997 season championship with a Stratus.

In Brazil, the Stratus was also marketed as the Chrysler Stratus, with the Chrysler Cirrus equivalent unavailable in that market. While it retained the same engine options as its North American counterpart, models sold in Brazil featured a higher ground clearance, an adaptation for local road conditions. Similarly, in Argentina, it was sold as the Chrysler Stratus. It gained recognition in motorsports, being raced in the South American Super Touring Car Championship by drivers Ernesto Bessone and Pablo Peon.

The Stratus was uniquely sold under both the Dodge and Chrysler brands for the Gulf States. The Chrysler-badged version notably adopted the styling of the European Stratus, but with the specific inclusion of the North American market's rear bumper.

== Second generation (2001–2006) ==
Second generation
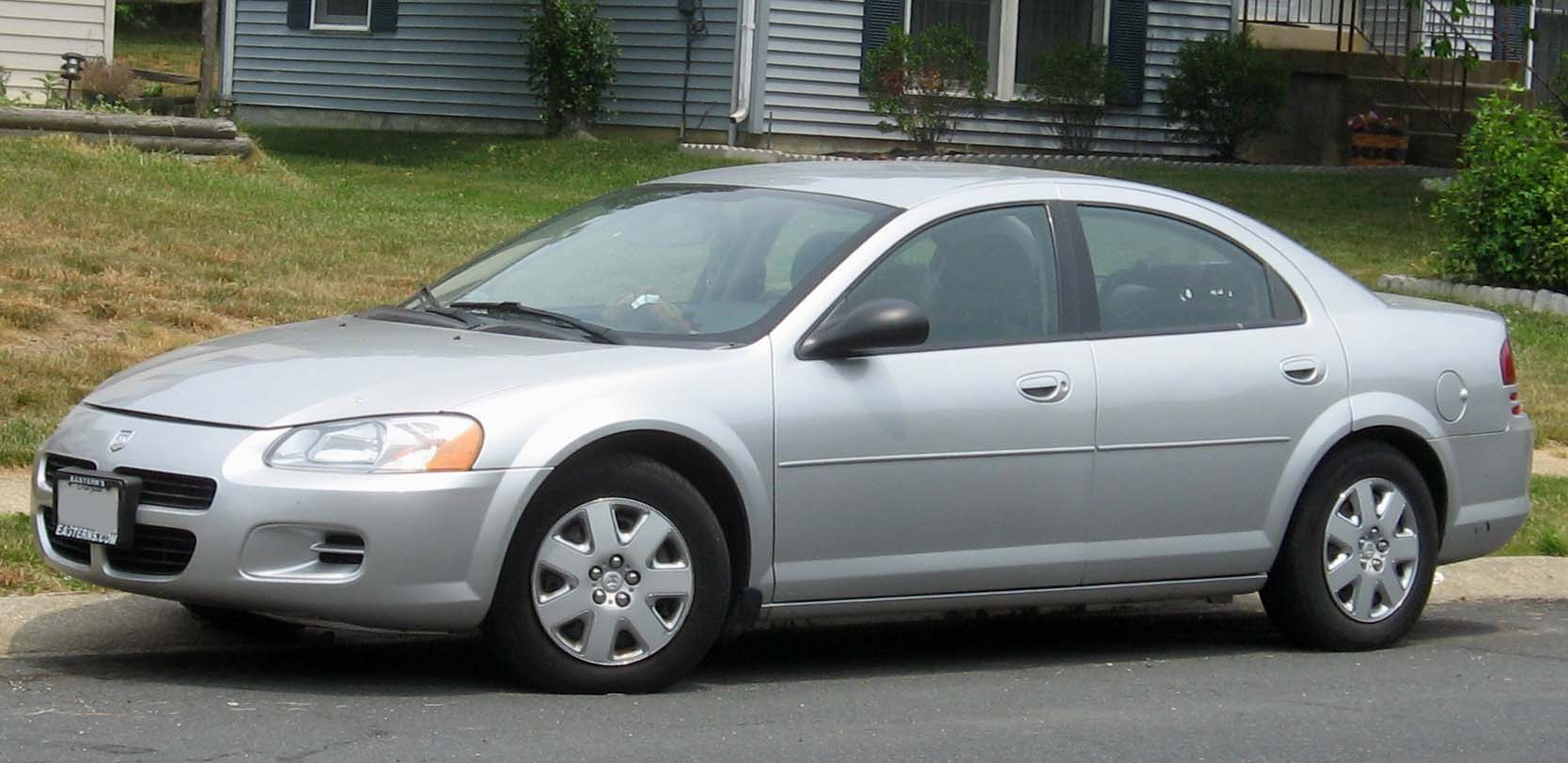
- 2001–2003 Dodge Stratus sedan

Overview
- Production: July 17, 2000–2006 (sedan); 2000–2005 (coupe)
- Assembly: United States: Sterling Heights, Michigan (Sterling Heights Assembly, sedan); Normal, Illinois (Mitsubishi Motor Manufacturing of America, coupe)

Body and chassis
- Body style: 4-door sedan 2-door coupe
- Platform: Sedan: Chrysler JR platform Coupe: Chrysler ST-22 platform
- Related: Sedan: Chrysler Sebring sedan Volga Siber; Coupe: Chrysler Sebring coupe Mitsubishi Eclipse

Powertrain
- Engine: Sedan: 2.4 L EDZ I4; 2.4 L EDV/EDT turbo I4 (Mexico); 2.7 L EER V6; Coupe: 2.4 L Mitsubishi 4G64 I4; 3.0 L Mitsubishi 6G72 V6
- Transmission: 5-speed manual 4-speed F4A42/F4A51 automatic 4-speed Ultradrive 41TE automatic

Dimensions
- Wheelbase: Sedan: 108.0 in (2,743 mm); Coupe: 103.7 in (2,634 mm)
- Length: Sedan: 191.2 in (4,856 mm); Coupe: 190.9 in (4,849 mm)
- Width: 2003–06 Sedan: 70.6 in (1,793 mm); 2001–02 Sedan: 71.9 in (1,826 mm); Coupe: 70.3 in (1,786 mm)
- Height: Sedan: 54.9 in (1,394 mm); 2003–06 R/T Sedan: 54.4 in (1,382 mm); 2003–05 Coupe: 53.9 in (1,369 mm); 2001–02 Coupe: 53.7 in (1,364 mm)

The second generation Dodge Stratus emerged for the 2000 model year, marking a pivotal moment in the "Cloud Car" lineage. With the Chrysler Cirrus being rebadged as the Chrysler Sebring, the Plymouth Breeze, and the entire Plymouth brand being discontinued, the Stratus became the sole remaining "Cloud Car" in Dodge's lineup. This generation of the Dodge Stratus sedan was not sold in Canada, where 1999 had marked the last year for Dodge Stratus sales; the Chrysler Sebring effectively took its place in that market. A minor cosmetic change occurred for the 2002 model year, as the "DODGE" badging on the front doors was removed.

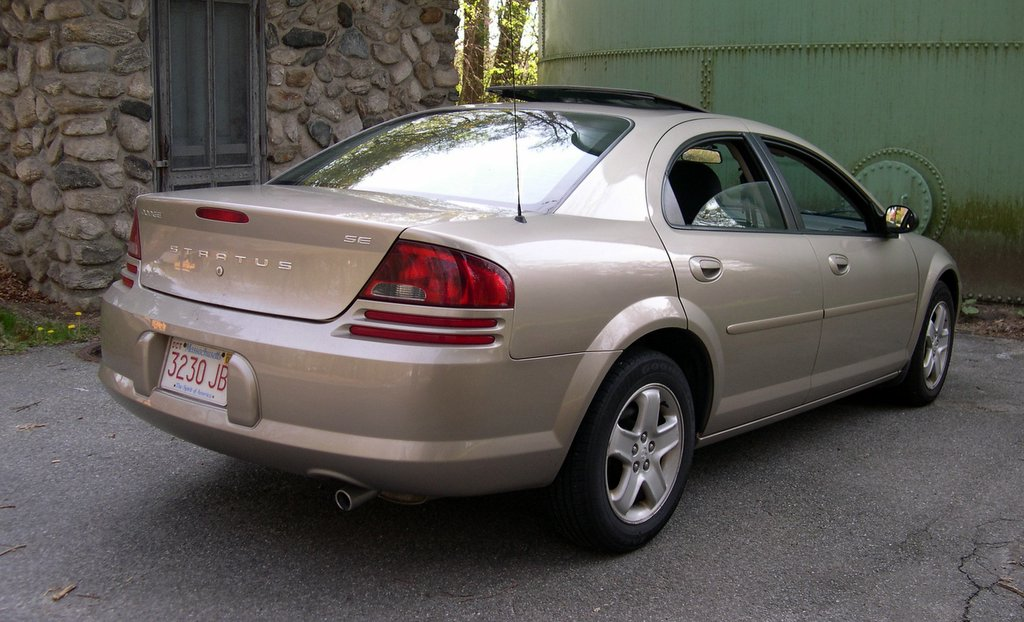
2002 Dodge Stratus sedan

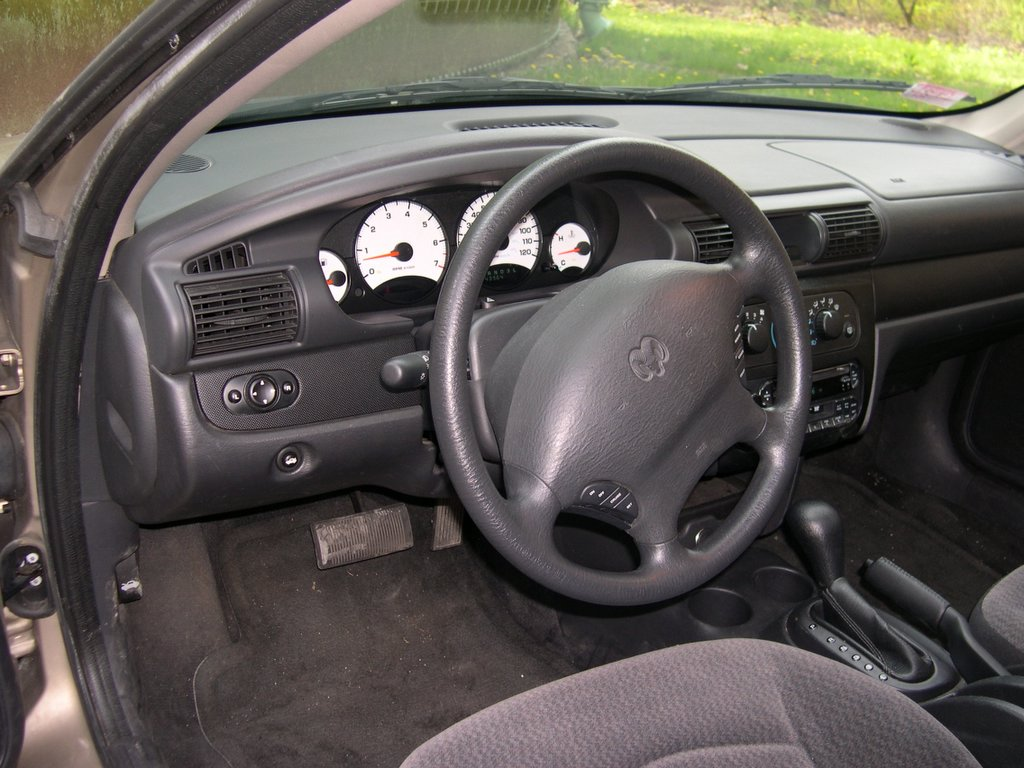
2002 Dodge Stratus interior

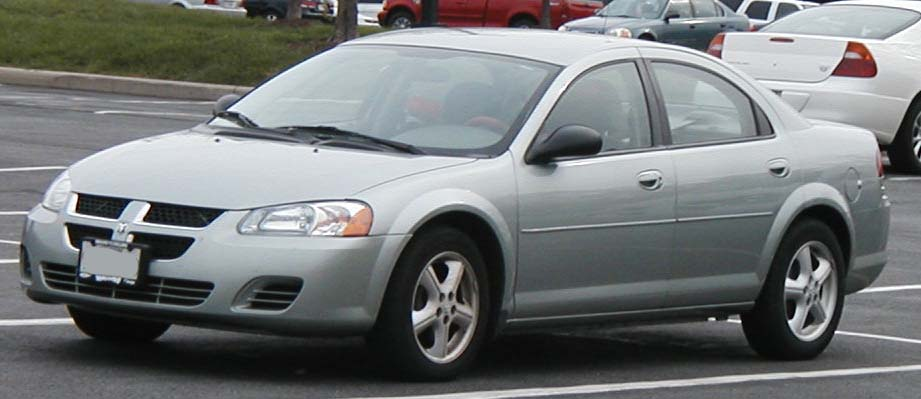
2004–2006 Dodge Stratus sedan

=== Platform and model differentiation ===
The second-generation Stratus sedan and its Chrysler Sebring sedan counterpart were built on a revised version of the Chrysler JA platform, internally designated as JR. This updated platform aimed to improve various aspects of the vehicle. However, a significant departure for the second generation was the introduction of coupe models (Dodge Stratus Coupe and Chrysler Sebring Coupe). Despite sharing names with their sedan and convertible siblings, these coupes were entirely different and based on the Mitsubishi Eclipse's ST-22 platform. They were built at the former Diamond-Star Motors plant (a joint venture between Chrysler and Mitsubishi). Beyond a few exterior styling cues and branding, the coupe models shared very little mechanically or structurally with their sedan and convertible counterparts.

=== Markets and discontinuation ===
During the second generation's production run, sales of the Stratus sedan experienced a decline. This was attributed mainly to falling ratings from various consumer and automotive magazines amidst increasing competition in the mid-size car segment. Concurrently, the sedan market was shifting, with Dodge's larger models like the Intrepid and, later, the Dodge Charger (LX) achieving record sales, potentially overshadowing the Stratus. Despite a minor styling refresh for the 2004 model year, sales did not improve significantly. The Dodge Stratus sedan production ultimately ceased in May 2006, though the Sebring name continued for Chrysler's mid-size sedan offering.

=== Performance variants (Mexico) ===
In the Mexican market, the Stratus continued to offer a performance-oriented R/T trim with a turbocharged 2.4 L I4 engine. For 2001, this turbocharged engine received upgrades, boosting its output to 215 hp (160 kW). This engine would later be utilized in higher-performance Chrysler products in the U.S. market, specifically the Dodge SRT-4 and PT Cruiser GT. Further enhancements were made to the Stratus R/T's turbocharged engine from March 2004 onwards, increasing its output to 225 hp (168 kW) at 5200 rpm and 235 lb⋅ft (319 N⋅m) of torque at 4200 rpm. These turbocharged Stratus R/T models were visually distinguished by a "Turbo" badge on the rear.

==== Engines ====
- 2.4 L EDZ I4
- 2.4 L EDV/EDT I4
- 2.7 L EER V6

=== Stratus coupe (2001–2005) ===
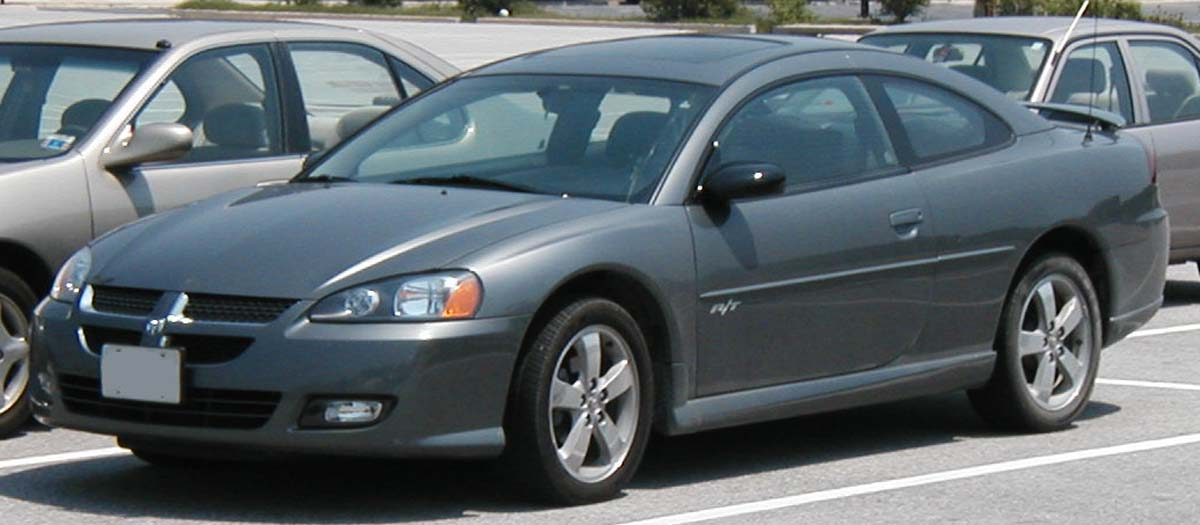
2004–2005 Dodge Stratus R/T coupe

Introduced for the 2001 model year, the Dodge Stratus Coupe replaced the discontinued Avenger two-door. This model, along with its Chrysler Sebring coupe twin, was built by Mitsubishi at the former Diamond Star Motors plant and utilized the ST-22 platform. The Stratus Coupe received a restyling for the 2003 model year, updating its exterior appearance. The coupe's production run was shorter than the sedan's. The two-door variant was discontinued after the 2005 model year, one year before the four-door model. When the Dodge Avenger nameplate was resurrected for the next mid-size Dodge model in 2008, it did not include a coupe version.

==== Engines ====
- 2.4 L 4G64 I4
- 3.0 L 6G72 V6

== Safety ==
Safety ratings for the Stratus varied by generation and optional equipment:

- First generation (1995-2000): The first-generation Dodge Stratus, tested explicitly as a Chrysler Cirrus by the Insurance Institute for Highway Safety (IIHS), received a "Poor" rating in the frontal crash test. Due to their shared platform and structure, these results also applied to the Dodge Stratus and Plymouth Breeze.
- Second generation (2001-2006): The second-generation Stratus sedan, along with its Chrysler Sebring twin, showed improvement, receiving an overall "Acceptable" rating in the IIHS frontal offset crash test. However, the test noted a potential for injury to the right leg. In the IIHS side impact test, the Stratus received a "Poor" rating when not equipped with optional side airbags. The low rating was attributed to a risk of serious neck injury, a weak side structure, possible rib fractures, and high forces on the shoulder and pelvis. However, the vehicle's seats and head restraints earned an overall "Acceptable" rating from the IIHS.

== Production in Russia ==
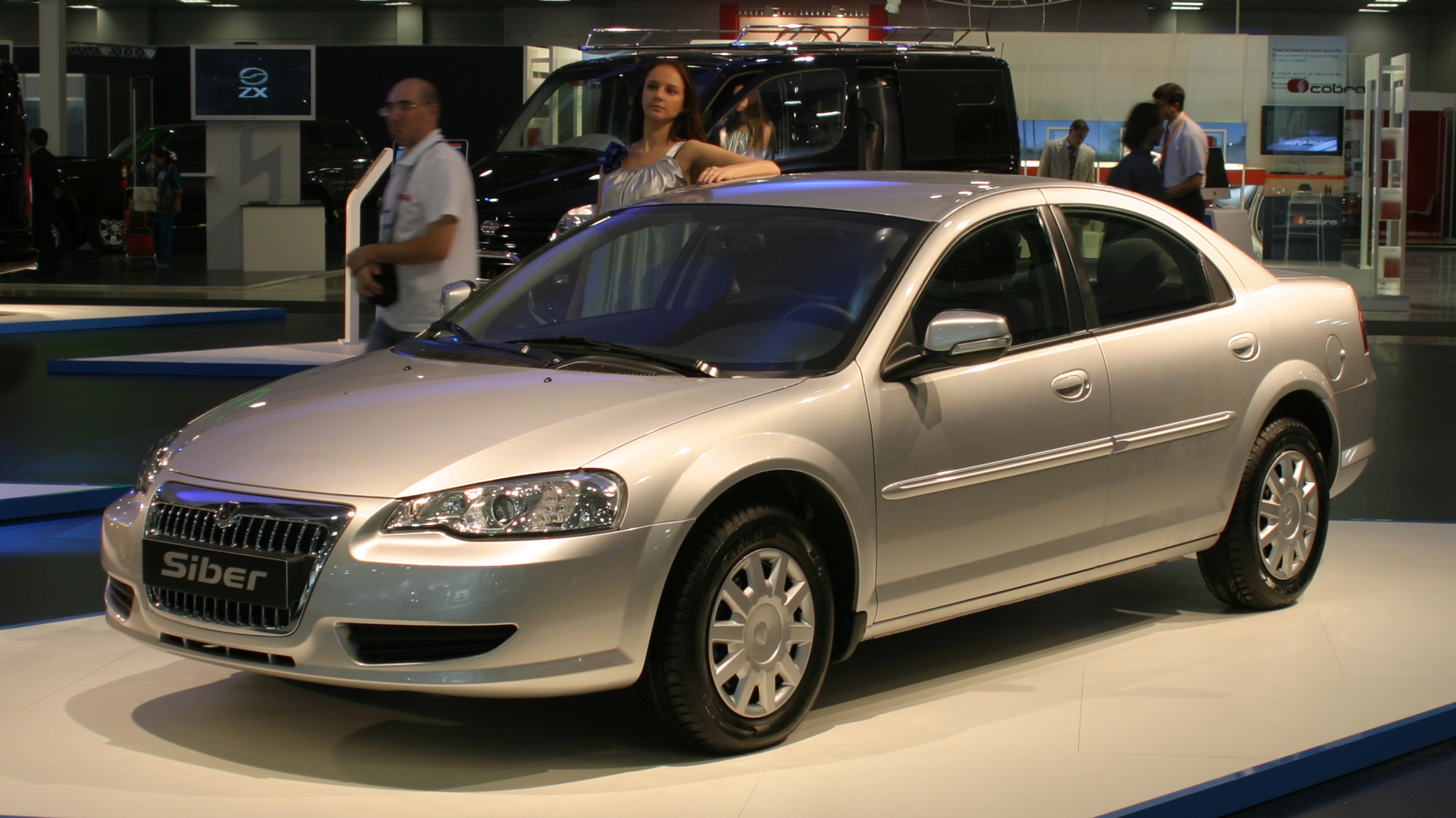
Volga Siber on the GAZ Group booth at the Moscow International Automobile Salon, 26 August 2008

In April 2006, Russian billionaire Oleg Deripaska, owner of the GAZ company in Nizhny Novgorod, acquired the complete license and production facilities for the second-generation Dodge Stratus and Chrysler Sebring sedans. This agreement took place during what is considered a period of relatively favorable political relations with Russia, and the height of Russia's industrial cooperation with Western firms.

The deal, valued at approximately US$151 million (€124 million), allowed GAZ to begin manufacturing slightly modified versions of these popular American mid-size cars in Russia from late 2007 through 2010.

GAZ's plans called for 14,000 Sibers to be built in 2008, 45,000 in 2009, and an annual production capacity of up to 65,000 units of both models. The four-cylinder engines to be sourced directly from Chrysler's manufacturing facilities in Mexico.

However, the Siber's launch coincided with the onset of the 2008 financial crisis, severely impacting its market reception. Despite initial projections for 40,000 vehicles per year, sales fell far short of expectations, with 8,933 units manufactured before the Volga Siber was discontinued after the 2010 model year. This makes the Siber a compelling case study in international automotive ventures and the unpredictable nature of market forces even

== Sales ==
Calendar year	United States
1998	123,303
1999	95,186
2000	128,549
2001	110,504
2002	114,056
2003	59,022
2004	136,014
2005	104,020
2006	102,317
Total	972,971
