= Chrysler LH engine =

Chrysler LH
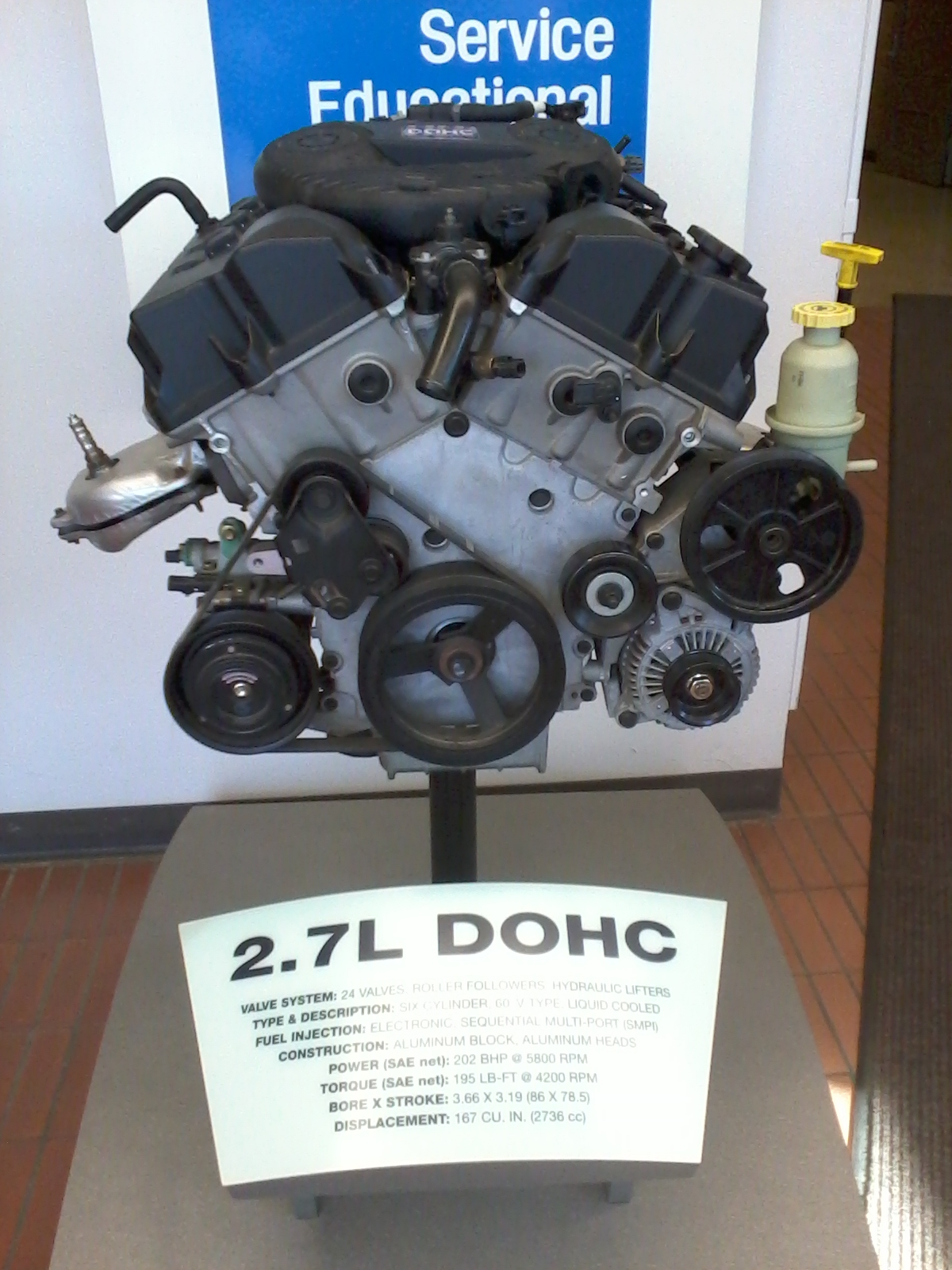

Overview
- Manufacturer: Chrysler Corporation (1998); DaimlerChrysler AG (1998–2007); Chrysler LLC (2007–2009); Chrysler Group LLC (2009–2010)
- Production: 1998–2010

Layout
- Configuration: Naturally aspirated 60° V6
- Displacement: 2.7 L; 167.0 cu in (2,736 cc)
- Cylinder bore: 86 mm (3.39 in)
- Piston stroke: 78.5 mm (3.09 in)
- Cylinder block material: Aluminum
- Cylinder head material: Aluminum
- Valvetrain: Dual overhead camshaft 4 valves per cyl.
- Valvetrain drive system: Timing Chain
- Compression ratio: 9.7:1, 9.9:1

RPM range
- Max. engine speed: 6,600 rpm

Combustion
- Fuel system: Sequential MPFI
- Fuel type: Gasoline; E85
- Oil system: Wet sump
- Cooling system: Water-cooled

Output
- Power output: 178–200 hp (180–203 PS; 133–149 kW)
- Torque output: 190 lb⋅ft (26 kg⋅m; 258 N⋅m)

Chronology
- Successor: Chrysler Pentastar engine

The Chrysler LH engine is a V6 engine developed by the Chrysler Corporation for its LH platform cars. It is a 60-degree V6 designed for front-wheel drive applications, later adapted to rear-wheel drive ones. The 2.7 liter LH engine is based on the SOHC 3.5 L engine, though bore spacing, cylinder bore, stroke, and assembly site are different.

== 2.7 L ==
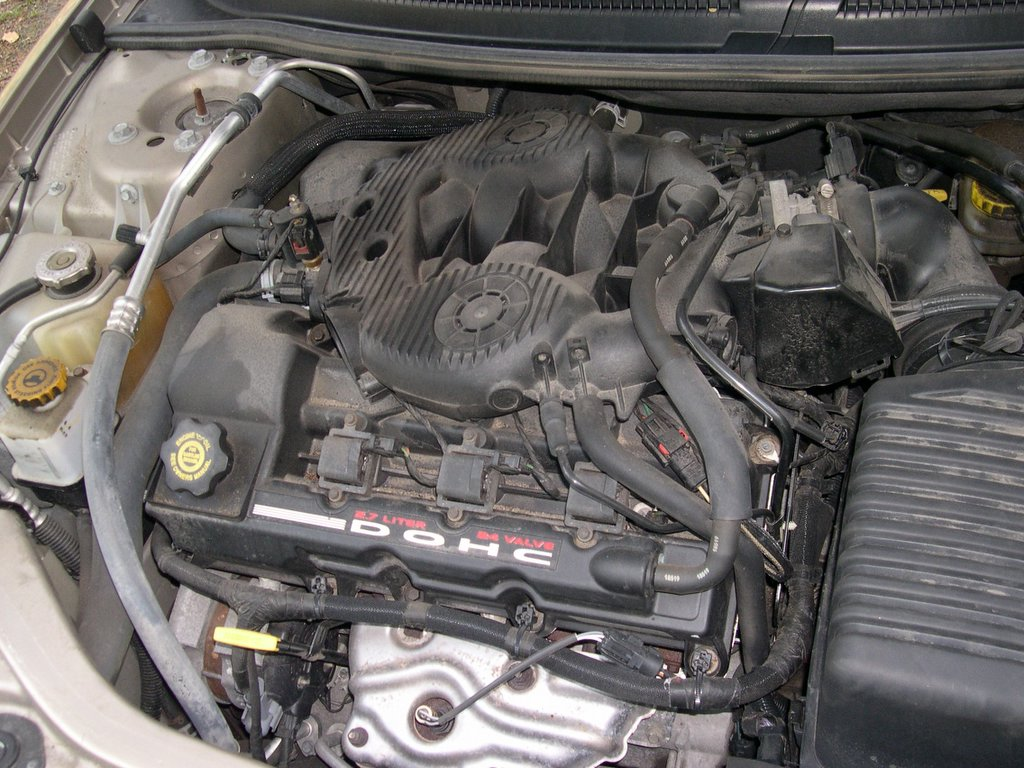
LH engine installed in a 2002 Dodge Stratus

The 2.7 L; 167.0 cu in (2,736 cc) EER version debuted in 1998 and is built in Kenosha, Wisconsin. It is a DOHC 24-valve design. Bore and stroke is 86 mm × 78.5 mm (3.39 in × 3.09 in). It is an aluminum block with cast-iron cylinder liners and aluminum heads. Output has varied depending on the application but typical was 200 hp (149 kW) at 5800 rpm with 190 lb⋅ft (258 N⋅m) of torque at 4850 rpm. In terms of emissions, this was a TLEV engine; it runs on regular-octane (87) gasoline. Compression when launched in 1998 was 9.7:1 (increased to 9.9:1 in the LX cars). Redline occurred at 6,464 rpm, originally; and at 6,600 rpm as revised for the LX. The 24 valves are actuated by hydraulic end-pivot roller followers and hydraulic lifters. Fuel injection was sequential for six ports for all engines.

The 2.7 differed from the 3.5 liter engine from which it was derived in many ways. The Magnum version featured a variable intake system to create a "supercharging" effect at different engine speeds. A three-row chain replaced the timing belt of the 3.5 liter engine, and the 2.7 in the LX also has electronic throttle control and an enhancement to the intake manifold (described in greater detail below), the former to allow for the use of electronic stability control.

In 2004, the 2.7 liter engine was adapted for use in the LX series of cars, dropping peak power to 189 hp (141 kW) at 6400 rpm and 190 lb⋅ft (258 N⋅m) of torque at 4,000 rpm; but increasing torque at launch and during mid-range operation for everyday driving. Chrysler claimed that part-throttle torque was increased by up to 10% in the primary driving range, 2100–3400 rpm. Horsepower again dropped in 2009 on the LX cars to 178 hp (133 kW) on the Chrysler 300 and Charger, but remains at 189 for the Chrysler Sebring.

Vehicles using this engine include:
- 1998–2001 Chrysler 300M (Europe)
- 1998–2004 Chrysler Concorde
- 1998–2004 Dodge Intrepid/Chrysler Intrepid
- 2001–2006 Dodge Stratus sedan
- 2001–2010 Chrysler Sebring convertible and sedan
- 2005–2008 Dodge Magnum SE
- 2005–2010 Chrysler 300
- 2006–2010 Dodge Charger SE (Initially, only fleet models received the 2.7 L in 2006)
- 2008–2010 Dodge Avenger
- 2009–2010 Dodge Journey (non-US markets)

=== Oil sludge and other known problems ===
Buildup of oil sludge is a common issue that plagues this engine. Higher than average operating temperature, an insufficient oil capacity and the timing chain driven water pump leaking into the crankcase are all factors in why this occurs . The 2.7 L V6 engines have suffered from oil sludge contamination. In February 2009, five separate class action lawsuits related to the alleged oil sludge defect were consolidated to the District of New Jersey. During the Chrysler bankruptcy proceedings, there was concern among consumer advocate groups that Chrysler's proposed "free and clear" sale of assets to "New Chrysler" would allow the automaker to avoid liability for the oil sludge defect.

The engine was affected by an oil sludge problem and premature timing chain tensioner failure. The oil sludge issue appears to have been caused by issues with the crankcase ventilation system, and while it affected a minority of engines, it could cause complete failure In some cases, neglected maintenance aided in premature failure (missed oil changes or increased intervals between oil changes). Also this engine was plagued with issues regarding the water pump gasket leaking coolant internally and diluting the oil. Such coolant leaks must be addressed immediately or engine failure is imminent.

== See also ==
- List of Chrysler engines
- Chrysler LH platform
