= Caradisiac =

- Company type: Joint stock company
- Founded: July 2000
- Founders: Cédric Bannel
- Headquarters: Paris, France
- Key people: François Couffy; Andreas Wiele
- Products: Internet media
- Owners: Axel Springer SE; Spir Communication
- Website: Official website

Caradisiac is a French language automotive website belonging to the French company Car & Boat Media.

== History ==
Caradisiac was launched in July 2000 by Cédric Bannel. In March 2001, the site got closer to Procar. In February 2002, Caradisiac joined the Auto Forum and launched thematic channels two years later. In September 2005, Caradisiac was acquired by Spir Communication. In 2007, Caradisiac merged with LaCentrale to create Car & Boat Media.

In 2010, Spir Communication once again became a 100% shareholder of Car & Boat Media (Caradisiac.com, lacentrale.fr). In 2014, Axel Springer SE takes control of Car & Boat Media by buying back 51% of the shares for 72 million euros.
