= J platform =

J platform may refer to:

- Chrysler J platform
- General Motors J platform
