= Newark Assembly =

US assembly plant

Chrysler Newark Assembly
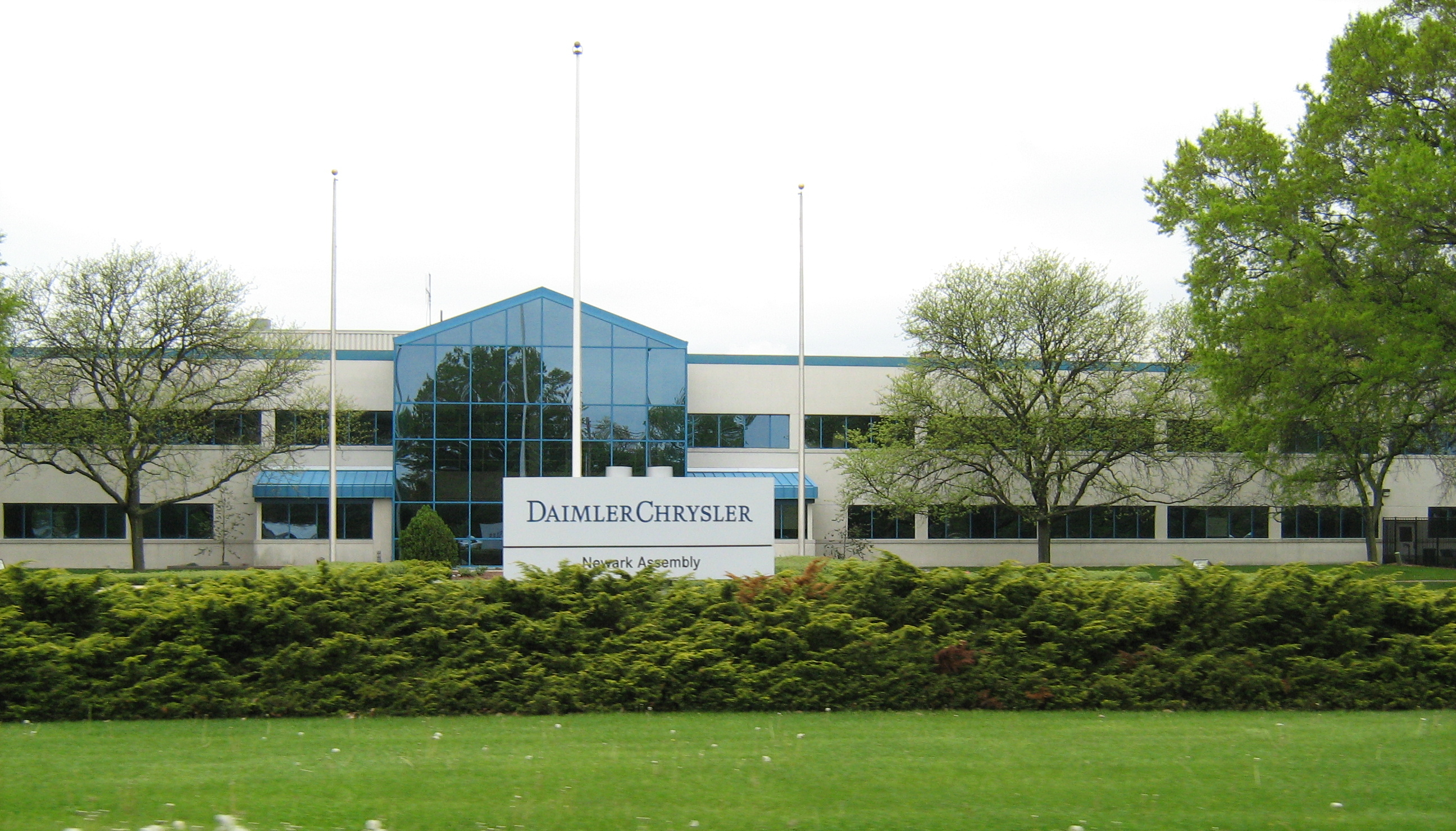
- Closed Office Building (April 2009)
- Built: 1951
- Location: Newark, Delaware
- Coordinates: 39.664°N 75.761°W
- Industry: Automotive
- Products: Tanks and vehicles
- Employees: 2,115 in 2005
- Area: 272 acres (110.1 ha)
- Defunct: 2008

Newark Assembly was a Chrysler (DaimlerChrysler from 1998–2008) factory in Newark, Delaware built in 1951 to make tanks and later automobiles with production continuing until December 2008.

Various Chrysler, Dodge, and Plymouth models were produced at this facility over the years, totaling nearly seven million cars.

The University of Delaware purchased and redeveloped the property.

== History ==
=== Tank production ===
Chrysler bought the facility in 1938 to use as a parts depot.

Construction began in January 1951 for a plant to produce tanks with the first M48 Patton driven to Army Ordnance on 11 April 1952. A total of 11,703 M48s were built at the plant between opening and 1959. A five-year phase-out after the Korean War brought the facility and tank production to an end by 1961. The plant also produced M103 heavy tanks. Initially named T-43, they were designed to use some components and systems of the M-48. Three hundred were built in Newark, but field experience showed that the heavy tanks required upgrades and retrofits of the medium-weight components. As of June 1954, the production of additional tanks was moved to General Motors in Detroit.

=== Vehicle production ===
The facility was used for the production of Plymouth and Dodge automobiles starting in 1957. By 1961, construction began on a 1,500,000 sq ft (140,000 m^{2}) Plymouth plant where the Chrysler A platform was used to build Dodge and Plymouth compacts. During 1969, the facility made 186,177 full-size Plymouth, Dodge, and Chrysler cars.

During the 1990s, a recycling initiative was implemented to reduce the factory's environmental impact and improve the facility's reputation. This resulted from several fires and air pollution from the plant, for which the Environmental Protection Agency fined the automaker.

To prepare the Newark plant for the production of the 1997 Dodge Durango, a sport utility vehicle (SUV), a $623 million investment included a new training facility, production simulation building, a paint shop, as well as upgrades to the 1.2-mile (2 km) test track, a new material handling fleet, and new controls on the assembly line.

On 14 February 2007, DaimlerChrysler announced that the plant would lose one working shift in 2007 and that it would be scheduled to be shut down entirely in 2009.

In October 2008, the company announced that the closure would be moved to the end of 2008, citing a slowdown in the economy and demand for large vehicles. The Newark assembly plant, built the slow-selling Dodge Durango and Chrysler Aspen meaning the closure also ended the hybrid models Durango and Aspen, the only hybrid versions that Chrysler marketed.

Production ended and the neighboring Mopar parts distribution center also closed in 2008.

=== University use ===
By May 2009, Chrysler was negotiating with The University of Delaware about the property. Newark was one of fifty members of the Mayors and Municipalities Automotive Coalition (MMAC) working to put closed plants into use. Newark officials were trying to attract businesses that would follow a possible move of U.S. Army facilities to Maryland but establishing operations in Delaware in light of the state's favorable tax policies. City leaders were not looking not at the loss of 950 blue-collar assembly jobs and wishing another automaker to take over the facility, but also at the opportunity to gain a high-tech park associated with the university.

On 24 October 2009, The University of Delaware announced it had signed a deal to buy the 272-acre (1.10 km^{2}; 0.425 sq mi) Chrysler facility for $24.25 million. The property is next to the university's south campus (the main campus is a 0.25-mile (402 m) to the north and usually accessible by bus by students). Plans are to use it as a research and development site and for the university's future expansion.

Demolition of the buildings began in November 2010, and the process was expected to take a year to 18 months. Only the former Chrysler Administration Building near the front of the facility will remain. Approximately 90% of the material on the site was recycled.

The development plans call for about 16,000 jobs at the property, focusing on research and collaboration between the public and private sectors. The first was the new Science, Technology, and Advanced Research (STAR) campus. In 2012, Bloom Energy, makers of the Bloom Energy Server held a groundbreaking for a new manufacturing plant at the former auto assembly site. In 2014, the first tenant of the revitalized Chrysler administration building will be the College of Health Sciences and a health-related complex.

On 19 November 2015, the Digital Infrastructure Management company SevOne announced its move to the STAR Campus

The history department at the University of Delaware and the Hugh M. Morris Library used a class of graduate and undergraduate students to conduct interviews of eleven former autoworkers employed at the Newark Assembly plant.

== Products ==
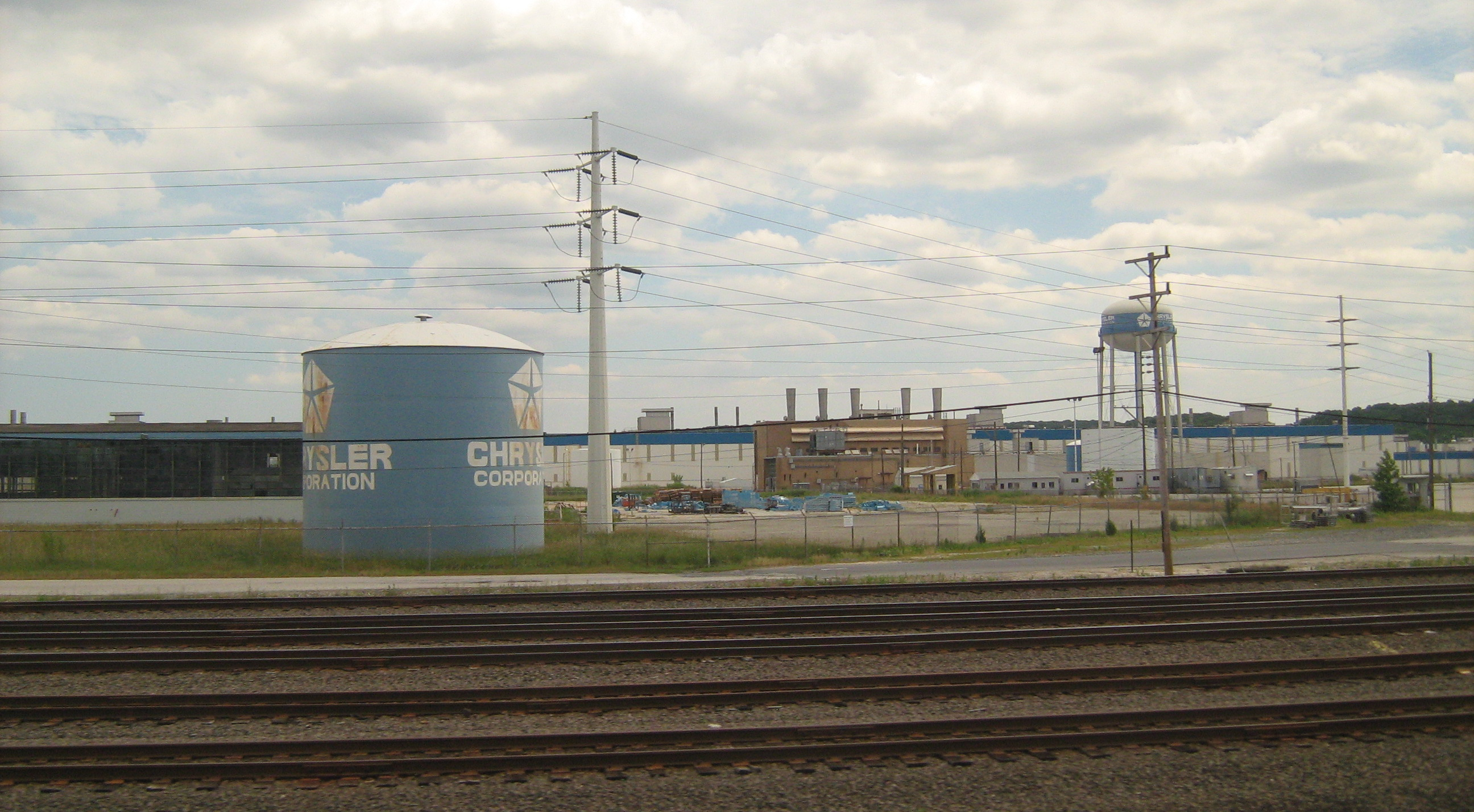
Facility viewed from Amtrak train (May 2010)

Assembly at the facility

- 1948–1959 M48 Patton tank
- 1959–1960 M60 Patton tank, the Tank Plant closed in 1961
- 1960–1964 Dodge Dart, Dodge Lancer, Plymouth Valiant
- 1964–1971 Chrysler
- 1974–1975 Dodge Dart, Plymouth Valiant
- 1976–1980 Dodge Aspen, Plymouth Volare
- 1977–1980 Chrysler LeBaron, Dodge Diplomat
- 1981–1988 Dodge Aries, Plymouth Reliant (sedan and station wagon)
- 1982–1988 Chrysler Town and Country Wagon
- 1982–1995 Chrysler LeBaron (Note: The J-body Chrysler LeBaron coupes and convertibles were produced in St. Louis Assembly from 1987 until 1991. In 1992, production was shifted to Newark until production ended in 1993 for the coupe and 1995 for the convertible.) (sedan from 1982 to 1988)
- 1989–1995 Dodge Spirit, Plymouth Acclaim
- 1992–1995 Chrysler LeBaron (coupe and convertible)
- 1994–1996 Chrysler Concorde, Dodge Intrepid (Note: Dodge Intrepids and Chrysler Concordes were only built in Newark Assembly from 1994 to 1996. During those years, Newark was an overflow plant for Brampton Assembly.)
- 1998–2009 Dodge Durango
- 2007–2009 Chrysler Aspen

== See also ==
- List of former automotive manufacturing plants
