= Chrysler LeBaron =

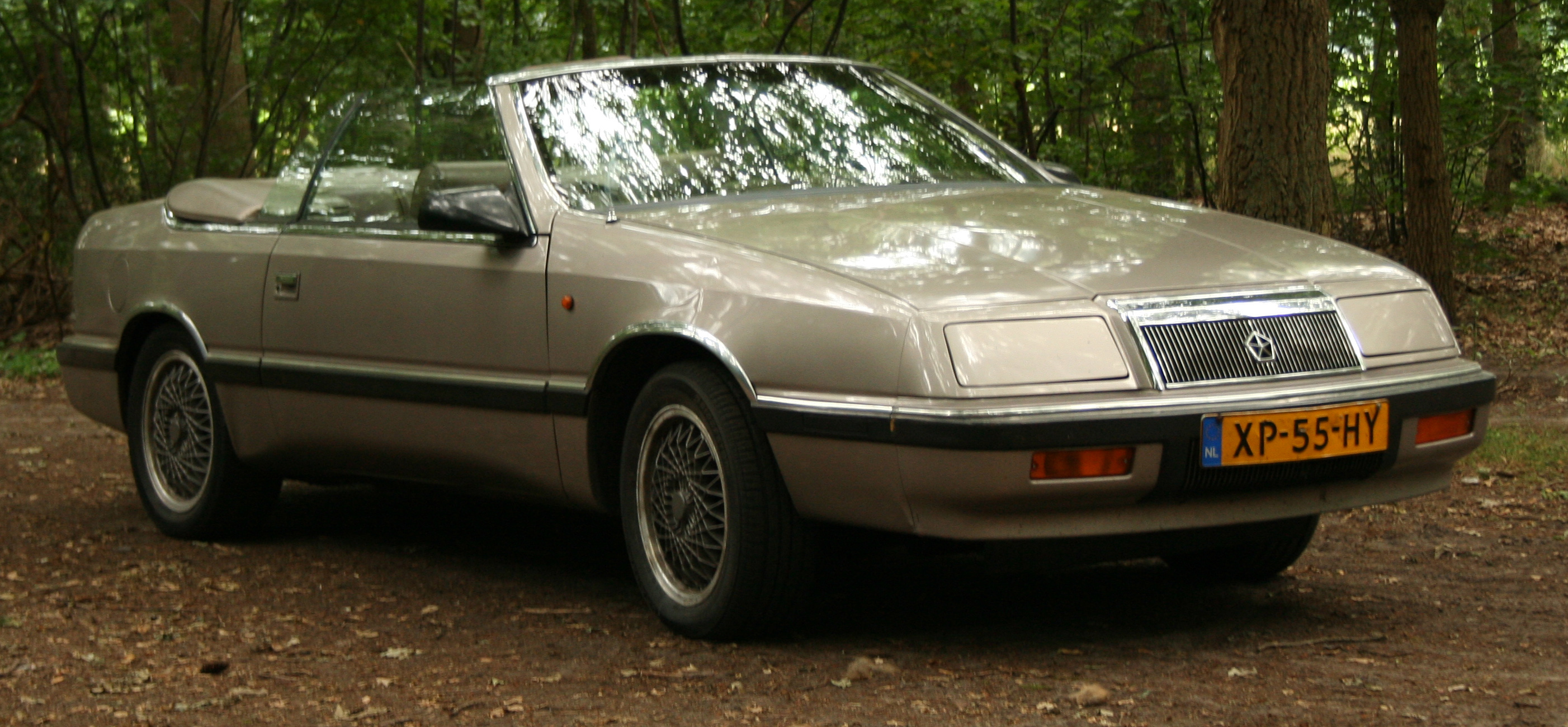
- Third generation LeBaron convertible

Overview
- Manufacturer: Chrysler Corporation

Body and chassis
- Class: Mid-size (1977–1995); Personal luxury (1986–1995)
- Layout: FR layout (1931–1981); Transverse front-engine, front-wheel drive (1982–1995)

Chronology
- Successor: Chrysler New Yorker Fifth Avenue for rear-drive M-body version (1982); Chrysler Fifth Avenue for rear-drive M-body version (1983); Chrysler Cirrus for front-drive sedan (1995); Chrysler Sebring for front-drive coupe (1995); Chrysler Sebring for convertible (1996)

The Chrysler LeBaron is a line of automobiles built by Chrysler from 1931 to 1941 and from 1977 to 1995. Chrysler also used the LeBaron name for the Imperial LeBaron from 1957 to 1975.

The model was introduced in 1931, with a body manufactured by LeBaron, and competed with other luxury cars of the era, such as Lincoln and Packard. After purchasing LeBaron with its parent Briggs Manufacturing Company, Chrysler introduced the luxury make Imperial in 1955, and sold automobiles under the name Imperial LeBaron from 1957 until 1975. Chrysler discontinued the Imperial brand for 1976 and reintroduced the Chrysler LeBaron in 1977 to what was then Chrysler's lowest-priced model.

Chrysler has used the LeBaron name across five cars:

- 1977–1981 M-body (mid-size) LeBaron sedan, coupe, and wagon
- 1982–1988 K-body (mid-size) LeBaron sedan, coupe, convertible, and wagon
- 1985–1989 H-body (mid-size) LeBaron GTS hatchback
- 1987–1995 J-body (personal luxury) LeBaron coupe and convertible
- 1990–1994 AA-body (mid-size) LeBaron sedan

The last Chrysler LeBaron was manufactured in 1995, to be replaced with the Cirrus and Sebring. The LeBaron was one of Chrysler's longest-running brands.

== The LeBaron background ==
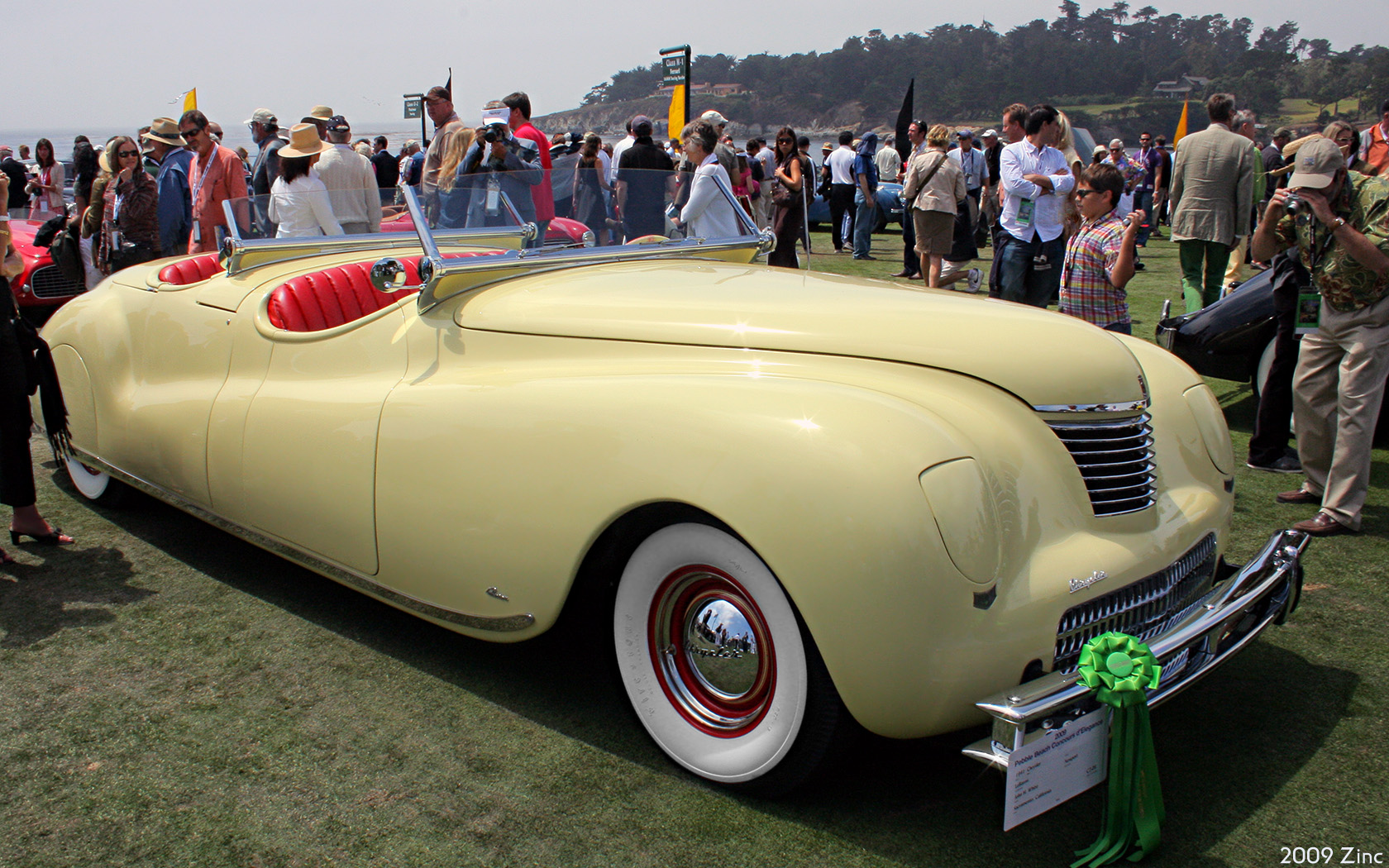
1941 Chrysler LeBaron Newport

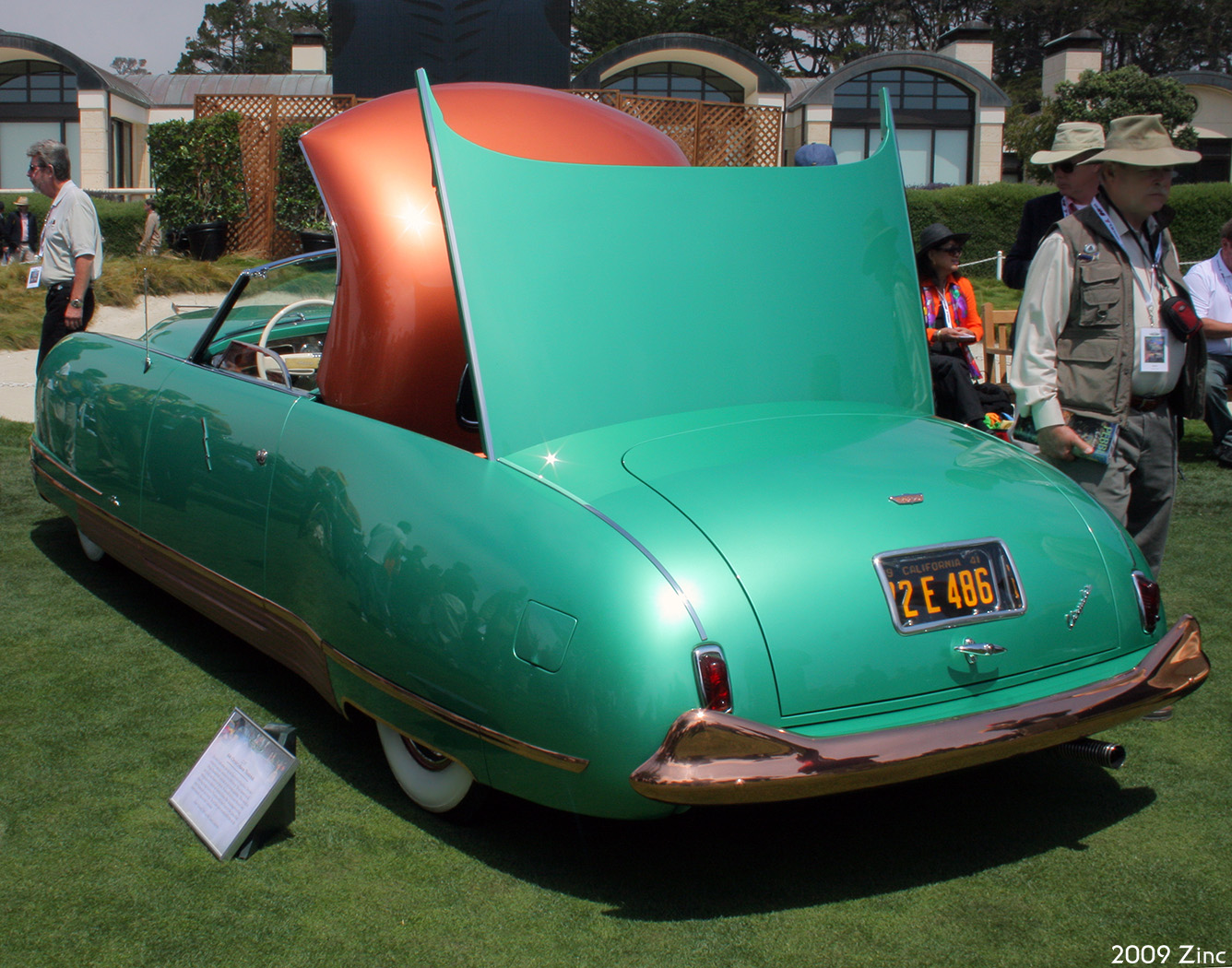
1941 Chrysler Thunderbolt

LeBaron was one of the many prominent coachbuilders in the 1920s and 1930s to provide bodies for luxury cars. It was founded in Bridgeport, Connecticut, in 1920 by Thomas L. Hibbard and Raymond H. Dietrich. It was later purchased by Briggs Manufacturing Company of Detroit in 1926, the major manufacturer of bodies for Ford, Chrysler, Hudson, Packard and others, and operated as a Briggs specialist subsidiary.

LeBaron supplied exquisite custom bodies for various car companies such as Chrysler's luxury Imperial line, Duesenberg, and Cadillac. LeBaron's last projects for Chrysler were the Chrysler Newport Phaeton, a super-streamlined dual cowl phaeton with an aluminum body, and the 1941 Chrysler Thunderbolt, a sleek roadster with concealed headlights (like the 1936 Cord 810/812) and a retractable metal hardtop styled by Alex Tremulis, who would later style the 1948 Tucker.

Chrysler purchased the Briggs Manufacturing Company in 1953. Two years after the Chrysler introduced the Imperial as a separate luxury division, the LeBaron name designated the top-of-the-line Imperial models from 1957 through 1975.

== Classic generation (1931–1941) ==
Classic generation
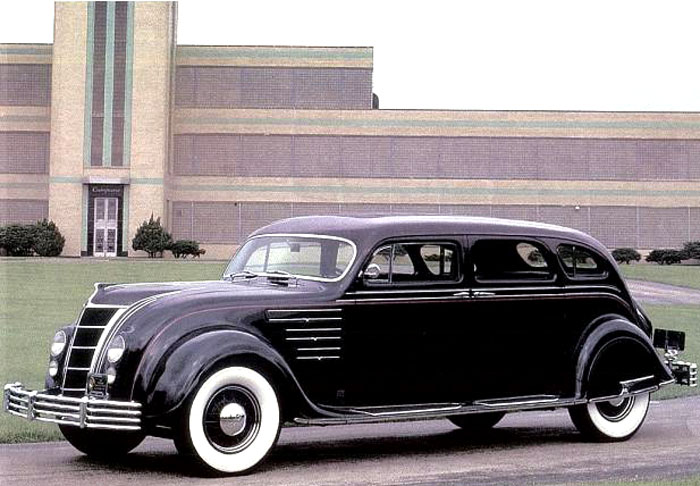
- 1934 Chrysler Imperial CL by LeBaron

Overview
- Production: 1930s
- Assembly: Detroit, Michigan, United States; Bridgeport, Connecticut, United States

Body and chassis
- Class: Luxury
- Body style: 2-door coupe 2-door convertible (roadster); 4-door sedan 4-door convertible
- Layout: FR layout
- Platform: Chrysler
- Related: Chrysler; Chrysler Imperial

Powertrain
- Engine: 385 cu in (6.3 L) Imperial 8 I8 and others
- Transmission: 3-speed manual 4-speed manual

The LeBarons started in the 1930s during the automobile's classic era and competed directly with the luxury brands of its day, such as Lincoln, Cadillac, and Packard. In the mid-1930s, Chrysler added a radical new "Art Deco" design shape, known as the Airflow Imperials, to the Chrysler line. LeBaron supplied the high-end CW series. The design features were considered advanced and perhaps ahead of their time. However, the shape was too radical for buyer's tastes, and non-Airflow models outsold Airflows by about 3 to 1. Raymond Dietrich, co-founder and former stylist at LeBaron, was hired in 1932 to be Chrysler's in-house stylist. Dietrich restyled the Airflow line and moved Chryslers to more mainstream styles. As a result of poor Airflow sales, Chrysler's designs became quite conservative for the next two decades. Auto manufacturers continued to build up their in-house styling departments and bodyworks. LeBaron thus became less important to most of its customers for design ideas and bodies. Toward the late 1930s, LeBaron/Briggs built more bodies for Chrysler and fewer for Ford. Chrysler became their biggest customer, with additional bodies built for Packard, Hudson, and Graham-Paige. During the late 1930s and early 1940s, the LeBaron name and division became less critical for Briggs, although it remained a division of Briggs until the Chrysler buyout in 1953.

LeBaron's last projects for Chrysler were two concept cars: the Chrysler Newport Phaeton, a super-streamlined dual cowl phaeton with an aluminum body, and the 1941 Chrysler Thunderbolt, a sleek roadster with concealed headlights and a retractable metal hardtop styled by Alex Tremulis, who went on to later style part of the 1948 Tucker. Only six of each were made.

== Imperial generation (1955–1975) ==
Imperial generation
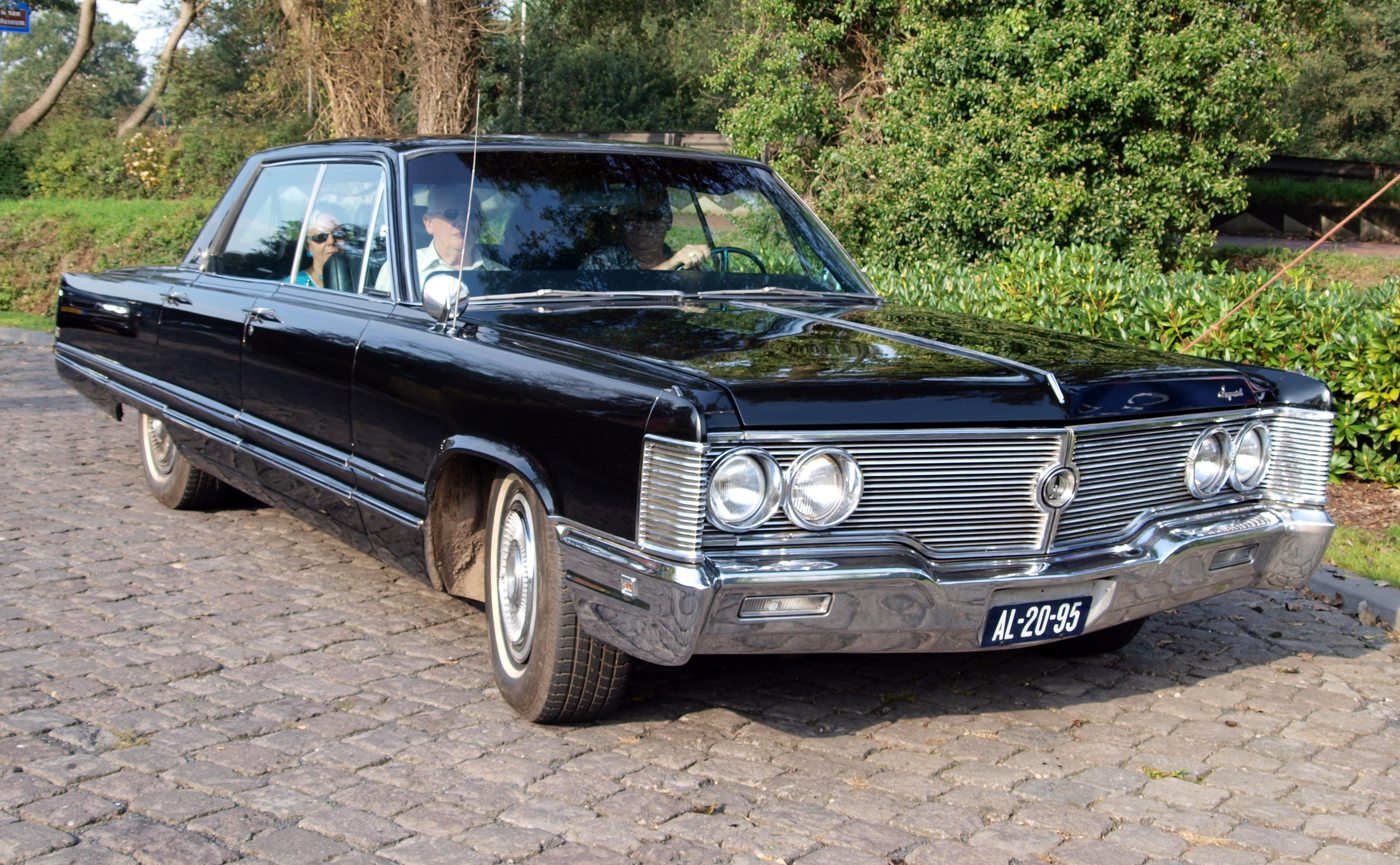
- 1968 Imperial LeBaron

Overview
- Production: 1956–1975
- Assembly: Jefferson Avenue Assembly; Detroit, Michigan, United States

Body and chassis
- Class: Full-size luxury
- Body style: 2-door hardtop 4-door sedan 4-door hardtop
- Layout: FR layout
- Platform: D-body; Unibody
- Related: Imperial; Chrysler Imperial

Powertrain
- Engine: 392 cu in (6.4 L) Hemi V8; 413 cu in (6.8 L) V8; 440 cu in (7.2 L) V8
- Transmission: 3-speed automatic

For the 1955 model year, Chrysler Corporation spun off Imperial as a separate make and division, making it the company's flagship luxury brand, taking its name from the original Chrysler Imperial series. Intended as a direct competitor to Cadillac, Lincoln, and Packard, Imperial was a completely distinct vehicle make/brand that did not use the Chrysler nameplate.

Through the existence of the division, Imperial used two nameplates alongside a nameless base model (Imperial Custom from 1960 to 1963). Its mid-range line was the Imperial Crown, with the flagship line branded as the Imperial LeBaron (in deference to the coachbuilder); Southampton was a sub-designation applied for pillarless hardtop body styles.

In June 1975, Chrysler retired the Imperial brand in response to declining sales of the marque. The Imperial LeBaron was repackaged for 1976 as the Chrysler New Yorker Brougham.

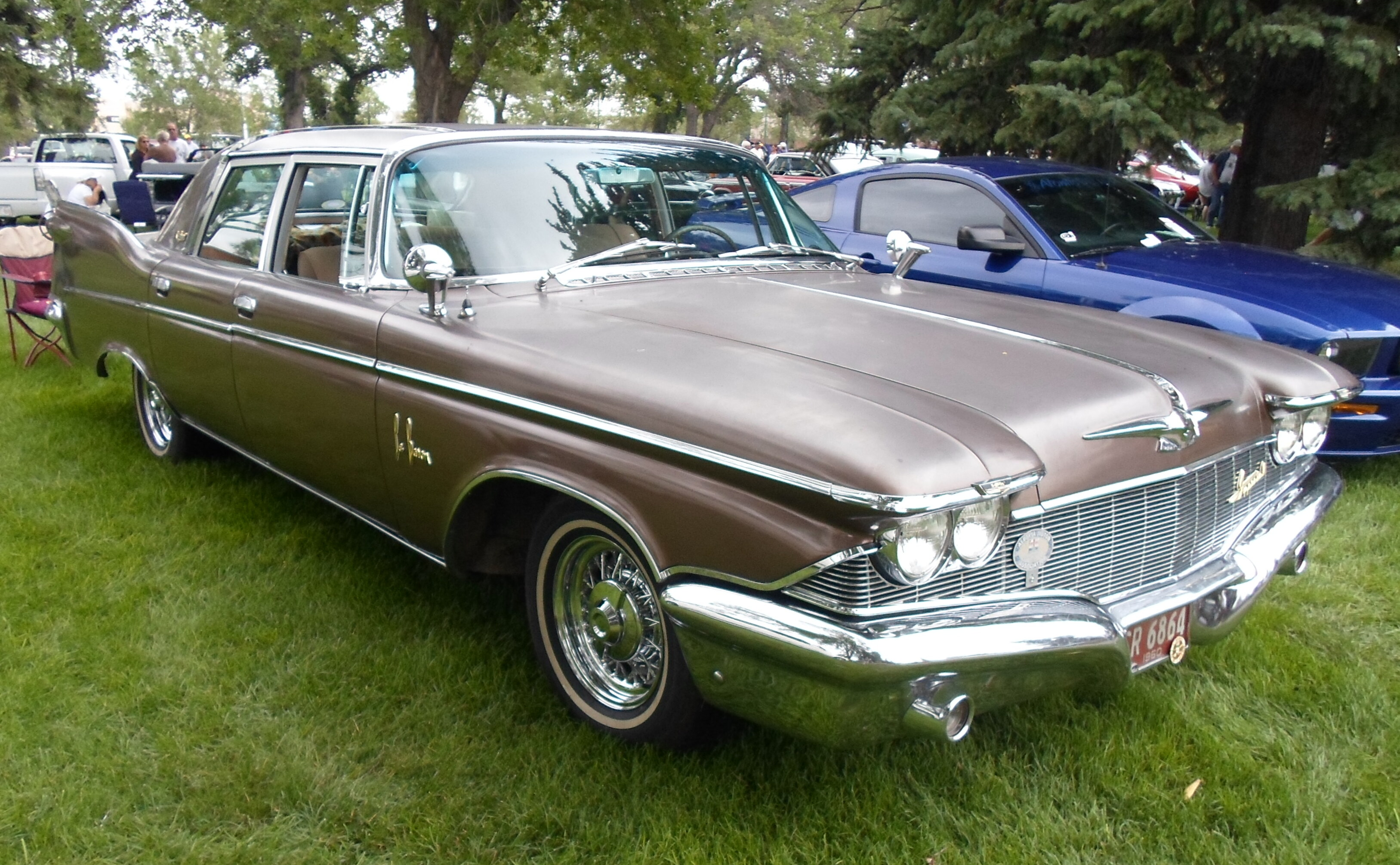
1960 Imperial LeBaron

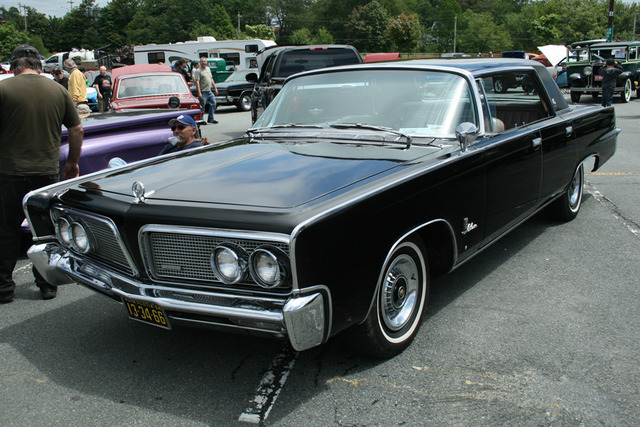
1964 Imperial LeBaron

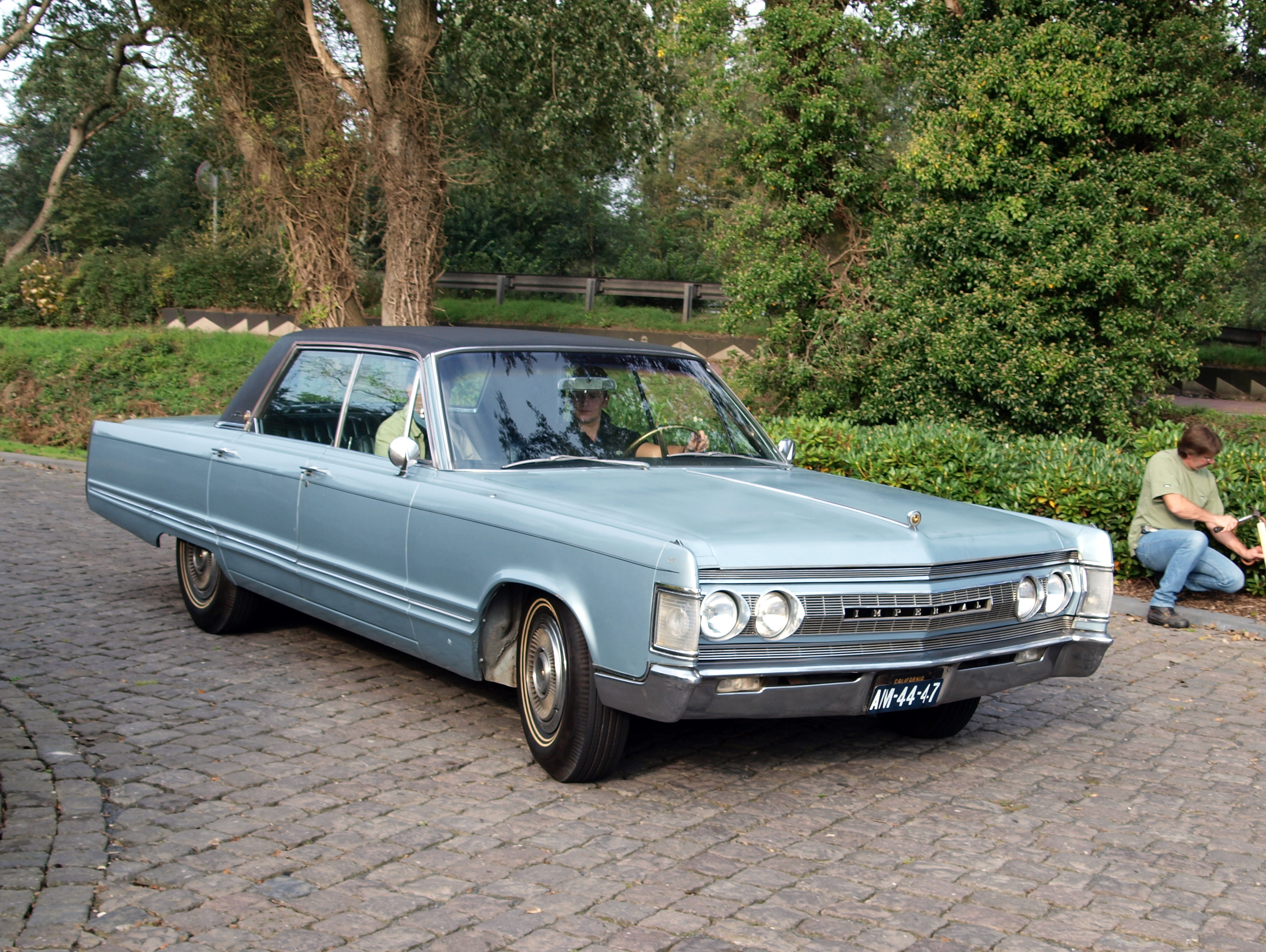
1967 Imperial LeBaron

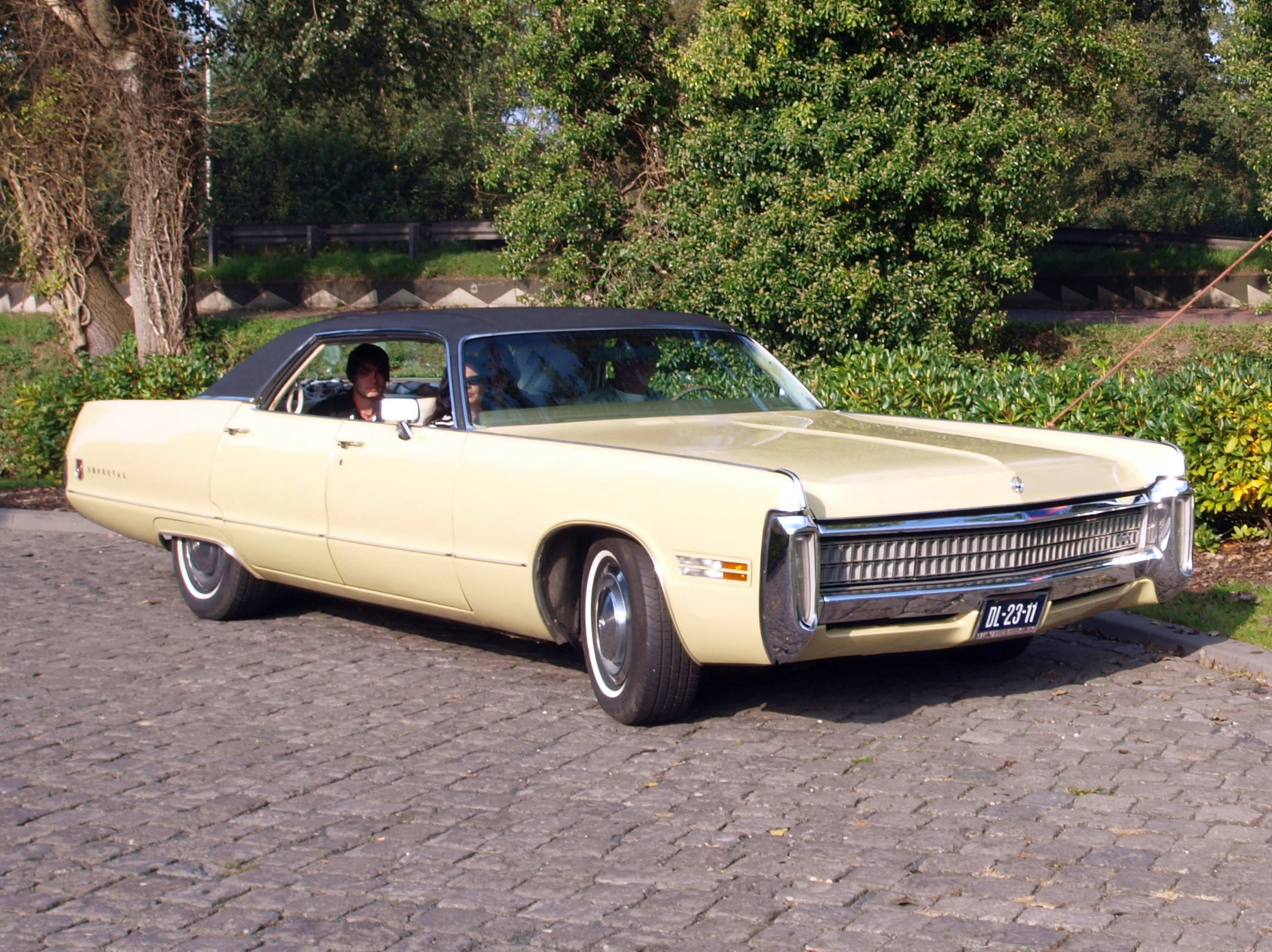
1972 Imperial LeBaron

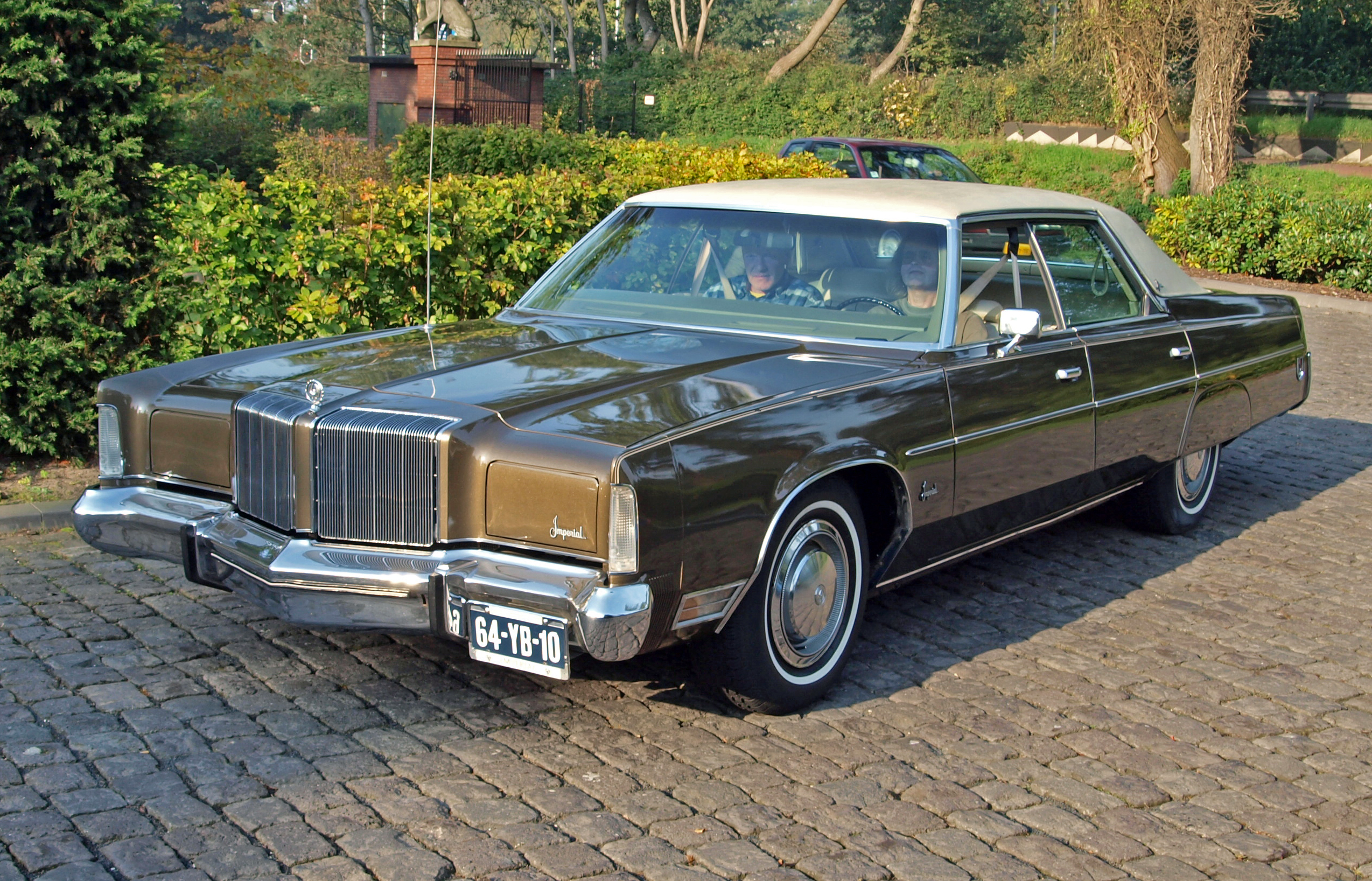
1974 Imperial LeBaron

== First generation (1977–1981) ==
First generation
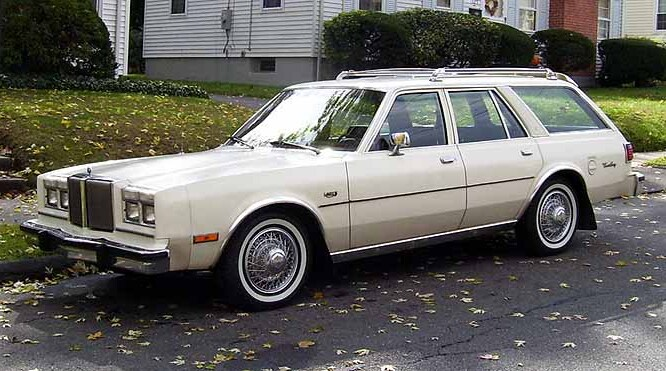
- 1980 Chrysler LeBaron Town & Country

Overview
- Production: 1977–1981
- Assembly: St. Louis, Missouri, United States (Saint Louis Assembly); Newark, Delaware, United States (Newark Assembly); Valencia, Venezuela; Toluca, Mexico (Toluca Car Assembly)

Body and chassis
- Class: Mid-size
- Body style: 5-door wagon (1978–81); 4-door sedan (1977–81); 2-door coupe (1977–81)
- Layout: FR layout
- Platform: M-body
- Related: Chrysler Town & Country; Dodge Diplomat; Plymouth Gran Fury

Powertrain
- Engine: 225 cu in (3.7 L) Slant-6; 318 cu in (5.2 L) LA 318 V8; 360 cu in (5.9 L) LA 360 V8
- Transmission: 3-speed A727 automatic 3-speed A904 automatic

Dimensions
- Wheelbase: 112.7 in (2,863 mm); 108.7 in (2,761 mm) (Coupe, 1980-81)
- Length: 204 in (5,182 mm) (2-door); 206.1 in (5,235 mm) (4-door)

Chronology
- Successor: Chrysler New Yorker Fifth Avenue; Chrysler Fifth Avenue

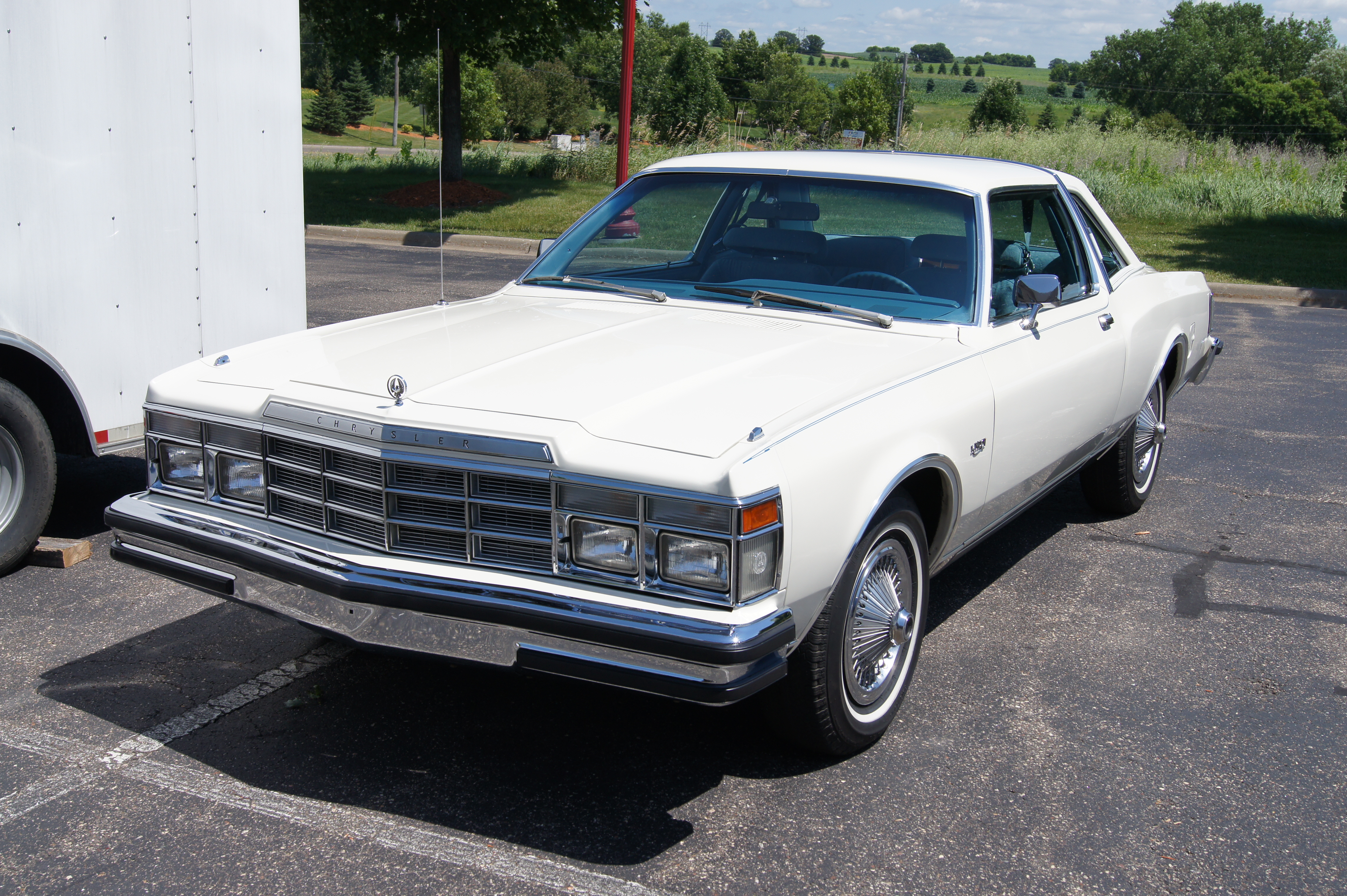
1977 Chrysler LeBaron coupe

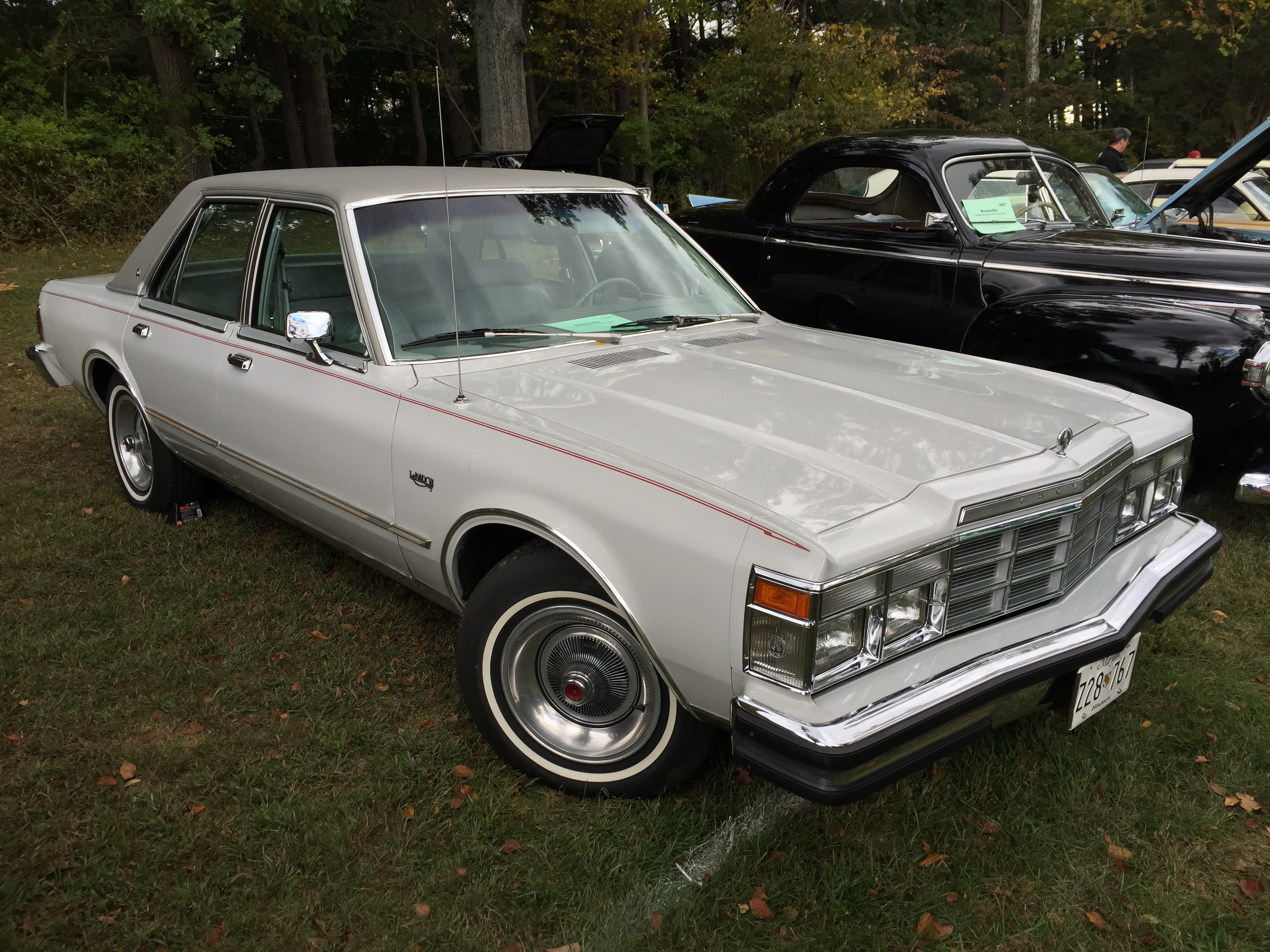
1978 Chrysler LeBaron sedan

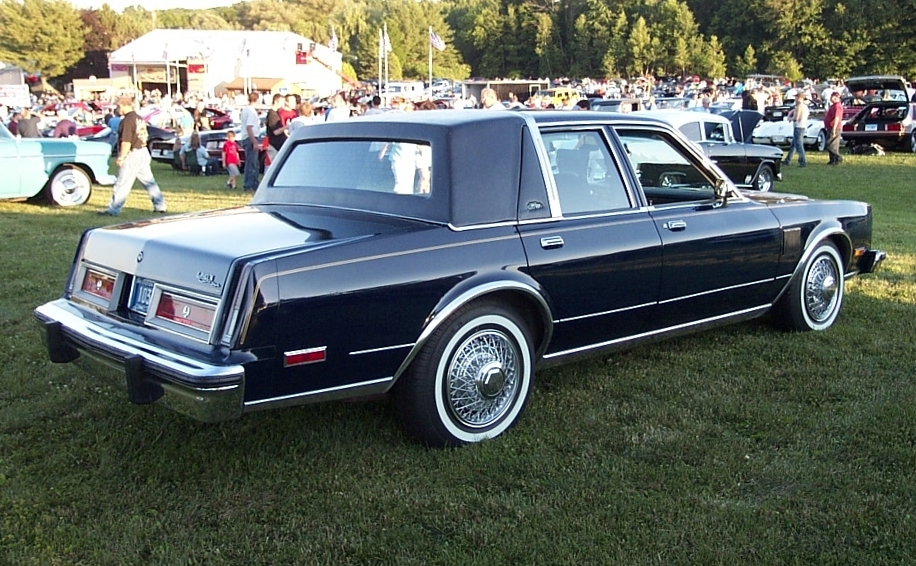
1980 LeBaron 5th Avenue Limited Edition; one of 654 produced

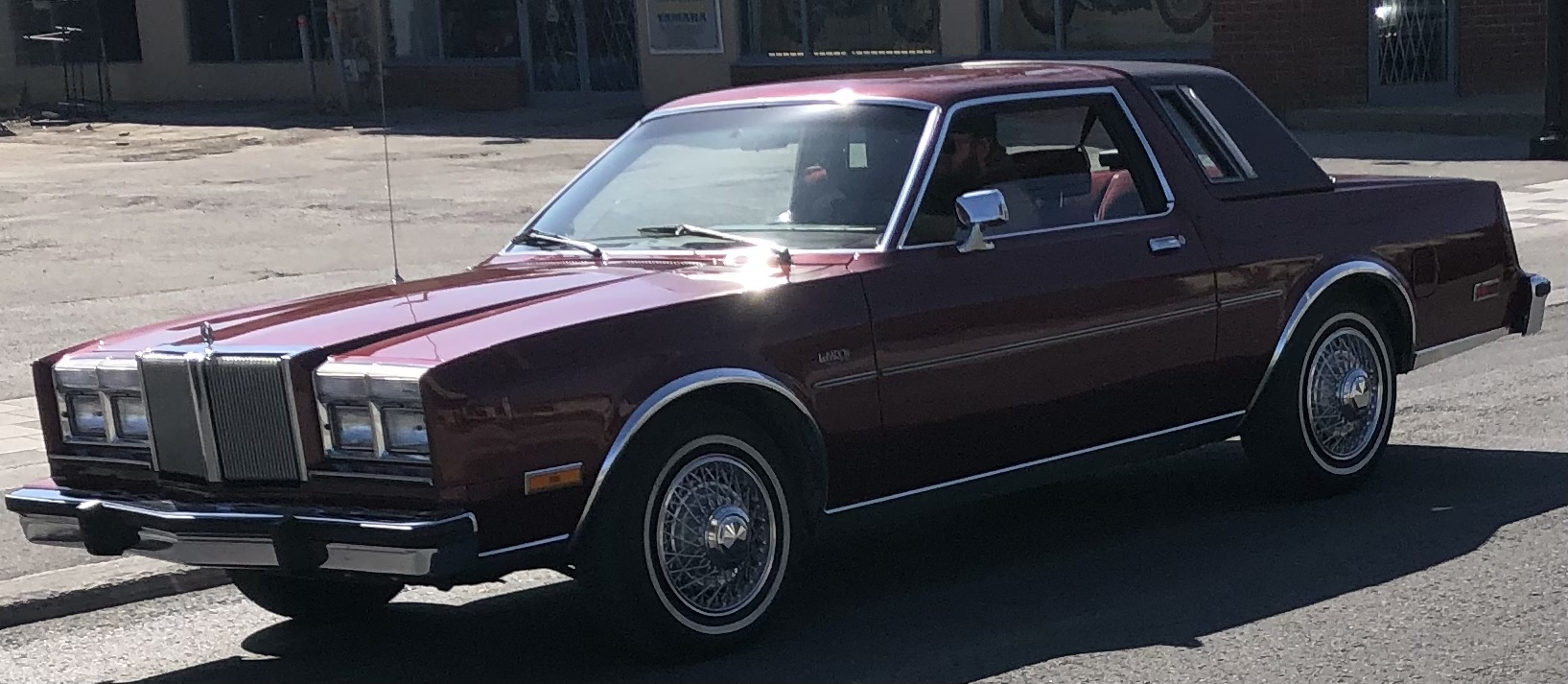
1980-1981 Chrysler LeBaron coupe

For 1977, the LeBaron model nameplate made its return after a year's hiatus. Released in response to the Cadillac Seville and Lincoln Versailles, the 1977 Chrysler LeBaron was the smallest vehicle ever marketed under the Chrysler brand at the time. While Cadillac and Lincoln offered its mid-size lines solely as four-door sedans, Chrysler also offered a two-door LeBaron coupe. For 1978, the Town & Country station wagon joined the model line.

Sharing its body with the Dodge Diplomat and Plymouth Caravelle, the LeBaron used the Chrysler M platform on a 112.7 in (2,863 mm) wheelbase. A new generation of the F platform introduced by the Dodge Aspen/Plymouth Volaré, the LeBaron sedan and wagon shared much of its roofline with the Aspen/Volaré; sharing its wheelbase with the sedan, the LeBaron coupe was fitted with a sleeker roofline than its Volaré counterpart. While visibly similar, the LeBaron was fitted with its own hood, trunk lid, and front and rear fascia panels. Both platforms shared a common powertrain lineup, with a standard 225 cu in (3.7 L) Slant Six; 318 cu in (5.2 L) or 360 cu in (5.9 L) V8 engines are optional. A three-speed Torqueflite automatic transmission was offered with all three engines, though a four-speed manual overdrive transmission was offered with the 225 and 318 engines.

=== 1980 model update ===
For 1980, the LeBaron underwent a mid-cycle revision. The exterior underwent several aerodynamic enhancements, featuring sharper-edged front corners, and a narrower radiator-style grille (similar to the 1975 Imperial, debuting a design used by Chrysler into the early 1990s). The roofline of the sedan was revised for aerodynamic upgrades; a squared-off look ended its design commonality with the Aspen/Volaré, and the coupe adopted a more formal profile.

To position the model line upmarket, Chrysler introduced the limited edition "Fifth Avenue" option package for the four-door sedan. A conversion by American Sunroof Corporation, the Fifth Avenue featured a padded vinyl roof covering the quarter glass of the rear doors and interior trim upgrades.

In response to the discontinuation of the Volaré after 1980, Chrysler introduced a police-equipment option package for the LeBaron for 1981, sold alongside the Chrysler Newport and R-platform Plymouth Gran Fury. For 1982, Chrysler replaced all three vehicles as it moved the Gran Fury to the M platform (joining the Dodge Diplomat), offering the option for the Diplomat and Gran Fury until Chrysler ended production of the M platform after 1989.

Production Figures:

(For 1979 and 1981, coupe and sedan production figures are not separated)

Chrysler LeBaron Production Figures
| | Coupe | Sedan | Wagon | Yearly Total |
|---|---|---|---|---|
| 1977 | 7,280 | 12,600 | - | 19,880 |
| 1978 | 47,313 | 59,575 | 21,504 | 128,392 |
| 1979 | 96,400 | | 17,463 | 113,863 |
| 1980 | 24,530 | 31,010 | 7,939 | 63,479 |
| 1981 | 37,010 | | 6,123 | 43,133 |
| Total | | | 53,029 | 368,747 |

== Second generation (1982–1988) ==
Second generation
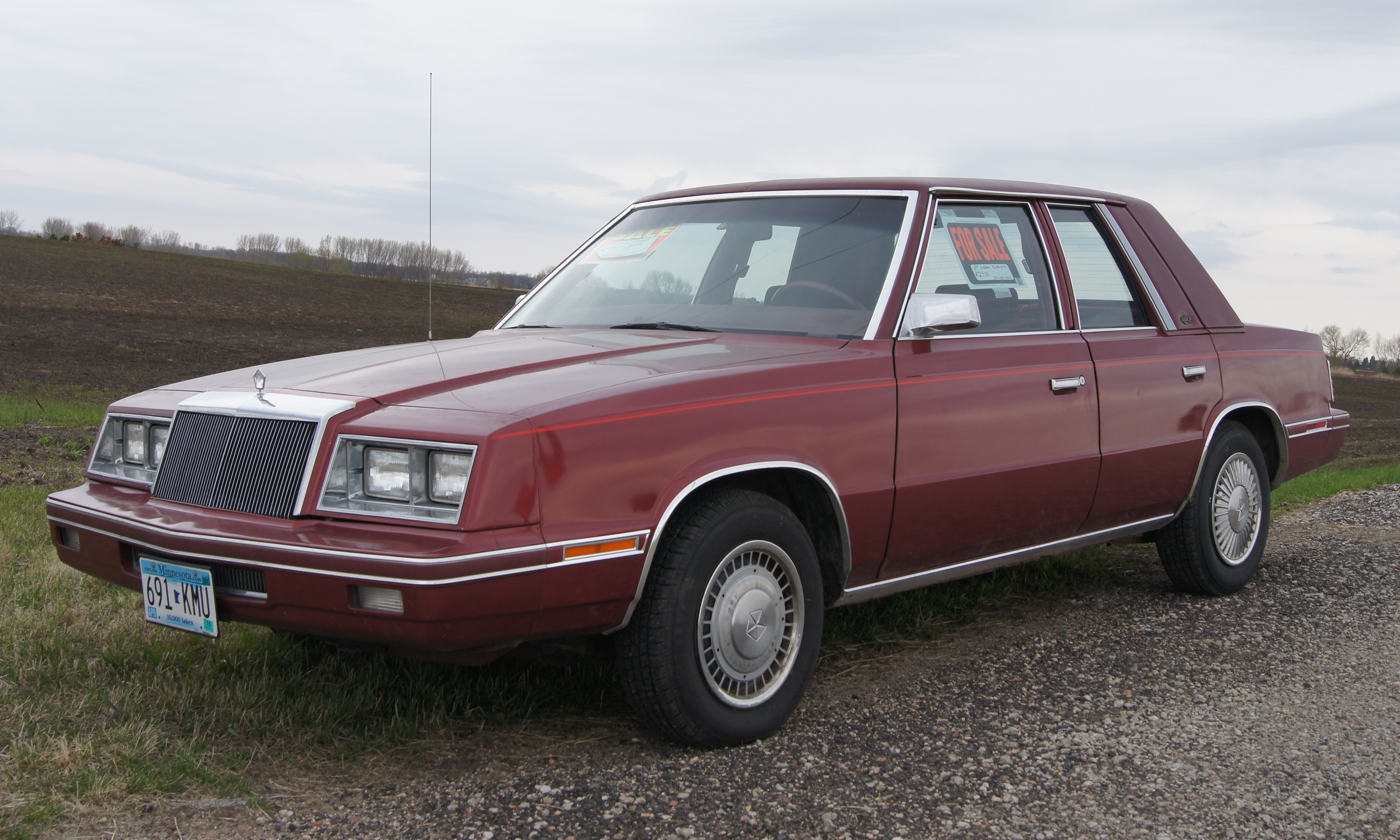
- 1984 Chrysler LeBaron

Overview
- Production: 1981–1988
- Model years: 1982–1988
- Assembly: Newark, Delaware, United States (Newark Assembly); St. Louis, Missouri, United States (Saint Louis Assembly, Toluca, Mexico (Toluca Car Assembly)

Body and chassis
- Class: Mid-size executive car
- Body style: 5-door wagon (1982–88); 4-door sedan (1982–88); 2-door coupe (1982–86); 2-door convertible (1982–86)
- Layout: Transverse front-engine, front-wheel drive
- Platform: K-body
- Related: Chrysler Town & Country; Dodge 400; Dodge Aries; Plymouth Reliant

Powertrain
- Engine: 2.2 L K I4; 2.2 L Turbo I I4; 2.5 L K I4; 2.6 L Mitsubishi G54B I4
- Transmission: 5-speed Getrag A525 manual 3-speed A413 automatic 3-speed A470 automatic

Dimensions
- Wheelbase: 100.3 in (2,548 mm)
- Length: 179.2 in (4,552 mm)
- Width: 68 in (1,727 mm)
- Height: 52.9 in (1,344 mm)

For 1982, the LeBaron moved to the front-wheel drive Chrysler K platform, where it was the upscale brand's lowest-priced offering. It was initially available in just sedan and coupe versions. In early 1982, it was released in a convertible version, bringing the first factory-built open-topped domestic vehicle to the market since the 1976 Cadillac Eldorado.

A station wagon version called the Town & Country was also added. A unique Town & Country convertible was also made from 1983 until 1986 with a 1,105 total produced, which, like the wagon, featured simulated wood paneling that made it resemble the original 1940s Town & Country. This model also offered the well-equipped Mark Cross option package for the latter years. Despite being mechanically similar to the Dodge Aries and Plymouth Reliant, its fascias closely resembled the larger E-body sedans. This generation featured Chrysler's Electronic Voice Alert, a computerized voice that warned drivers about various conditions with phrases such as "A door is ajar" or "Your engine oil pressure is low".

The LeBaron was facelifted for 1986, receiving rounder front and rear ends to improve aerodynamics. A landau padded top replaced the sedan's full vinyl roof. The instrumentation cluster was revised from a rectangle speedometer and fuel gauge with a message center to round gauges similar to the Reliant/Aries, but with an argent surround for a more upscale appearance. Coupes and convertibles were dropped for 1987, replaced by the all-new J-body LeBaron released that year. The sedan and wagon continued with minor changes until 1988. A new digital dashboard replaced the analog gauges for a more modern appearance. A larger LeBaron sedan based on the Dodge Spirit and Plymouth Acclaim would arrive for the 1990 model year.

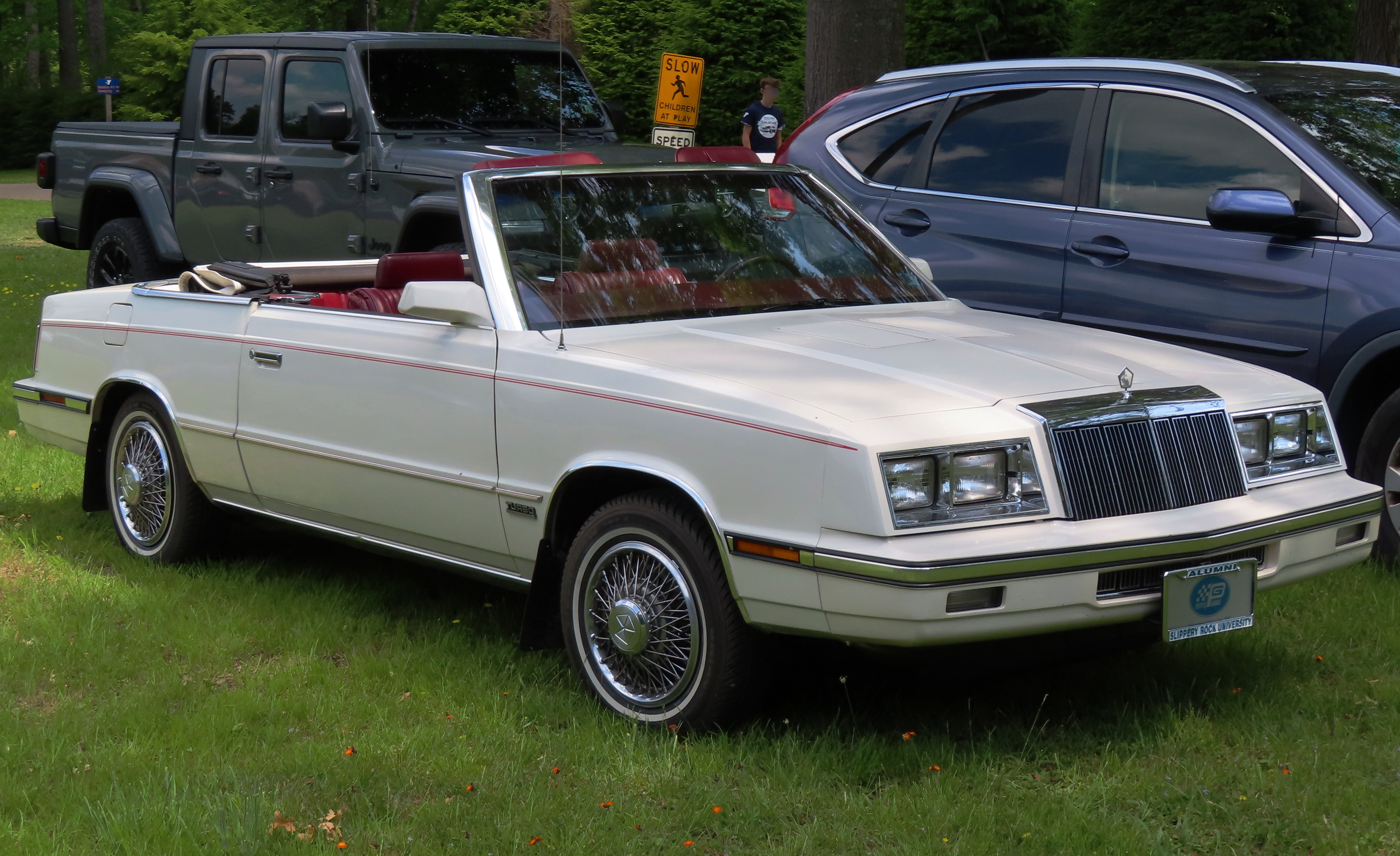
1985 Chrysler LeBaron convertible

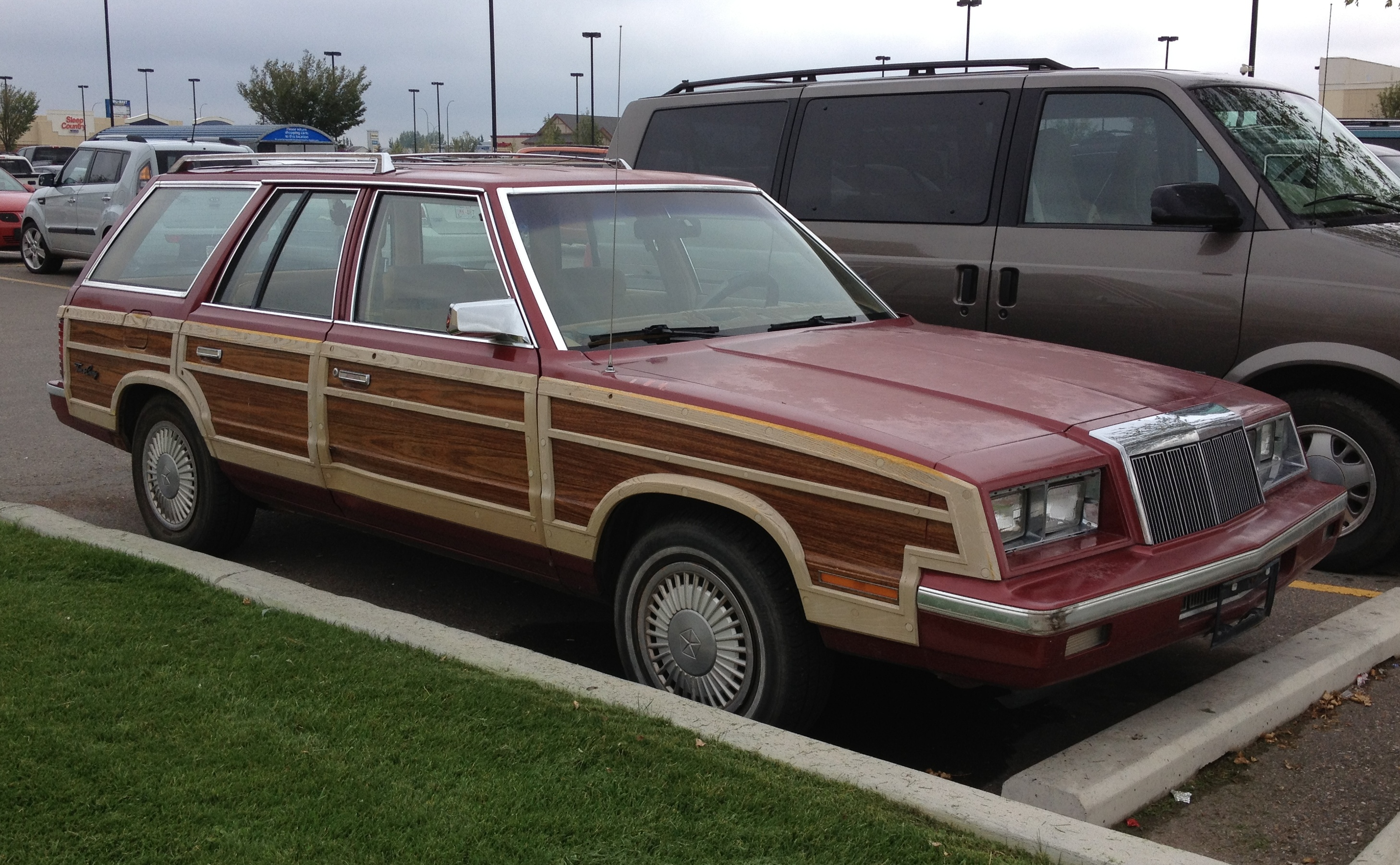
1985 Chrysler LeBaron Town & Country station wagon

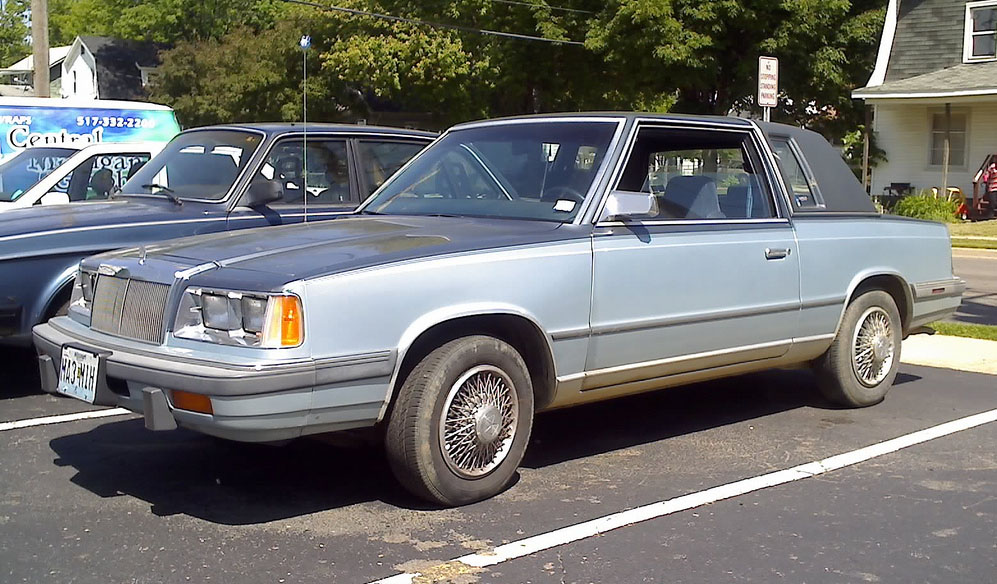
1986 Chrysler LeBaron coupe

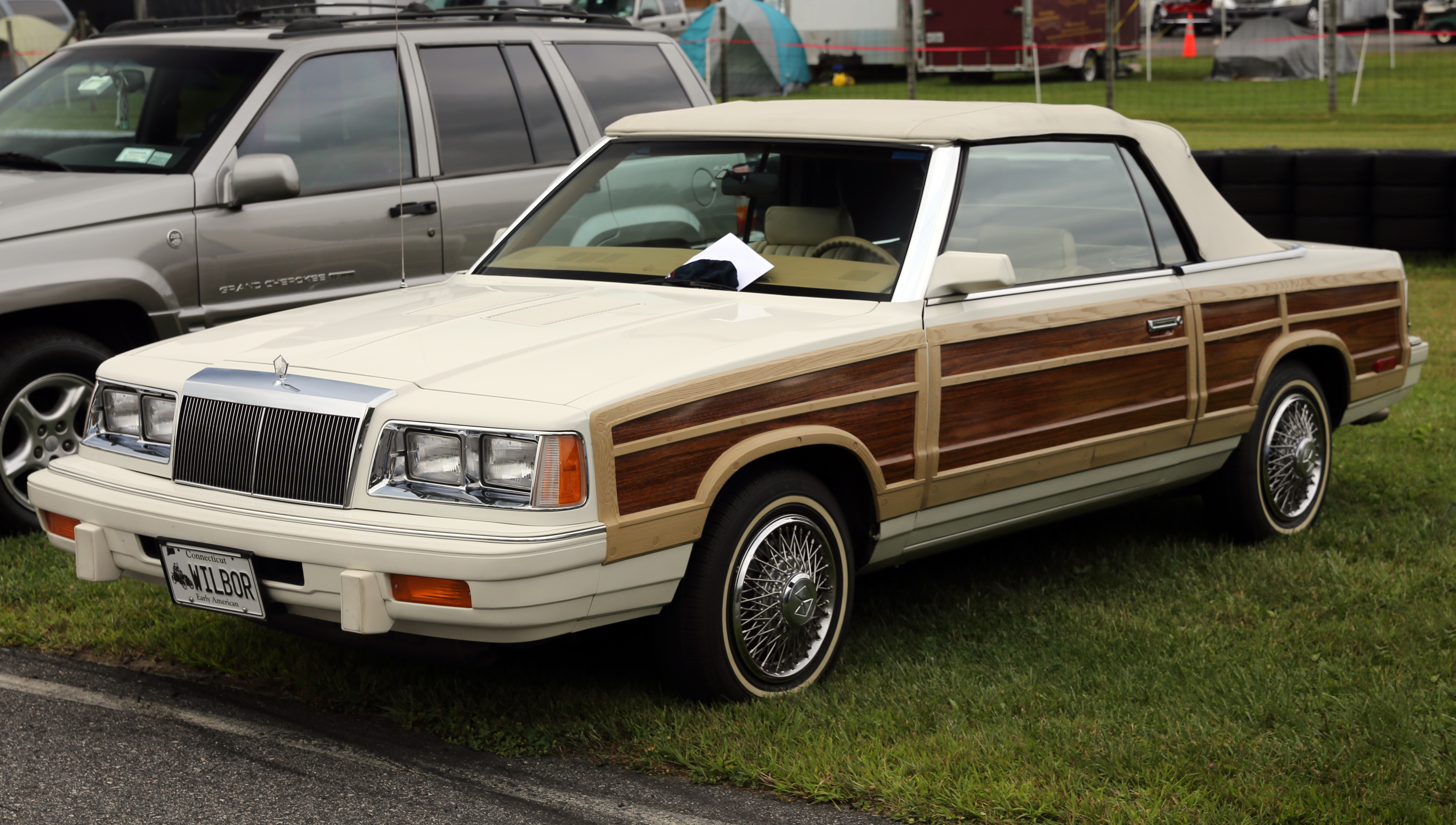
1986 Chrysler LeBaron Town & Country convertible

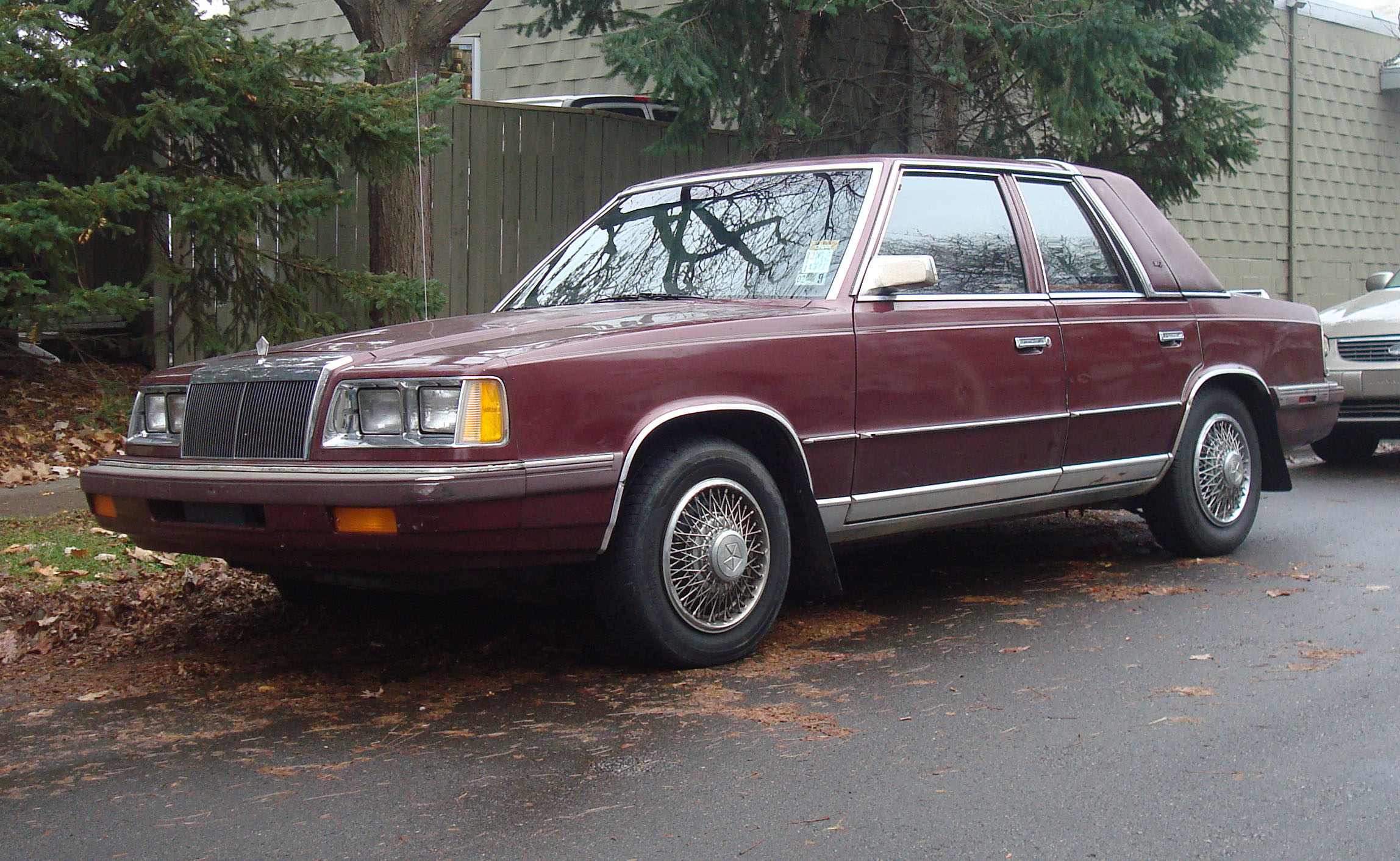
1987 Chrysler LeBaron sedan

=== 1985–1989 LeBaron GTS ===
LeBaron GTS/LeBaron
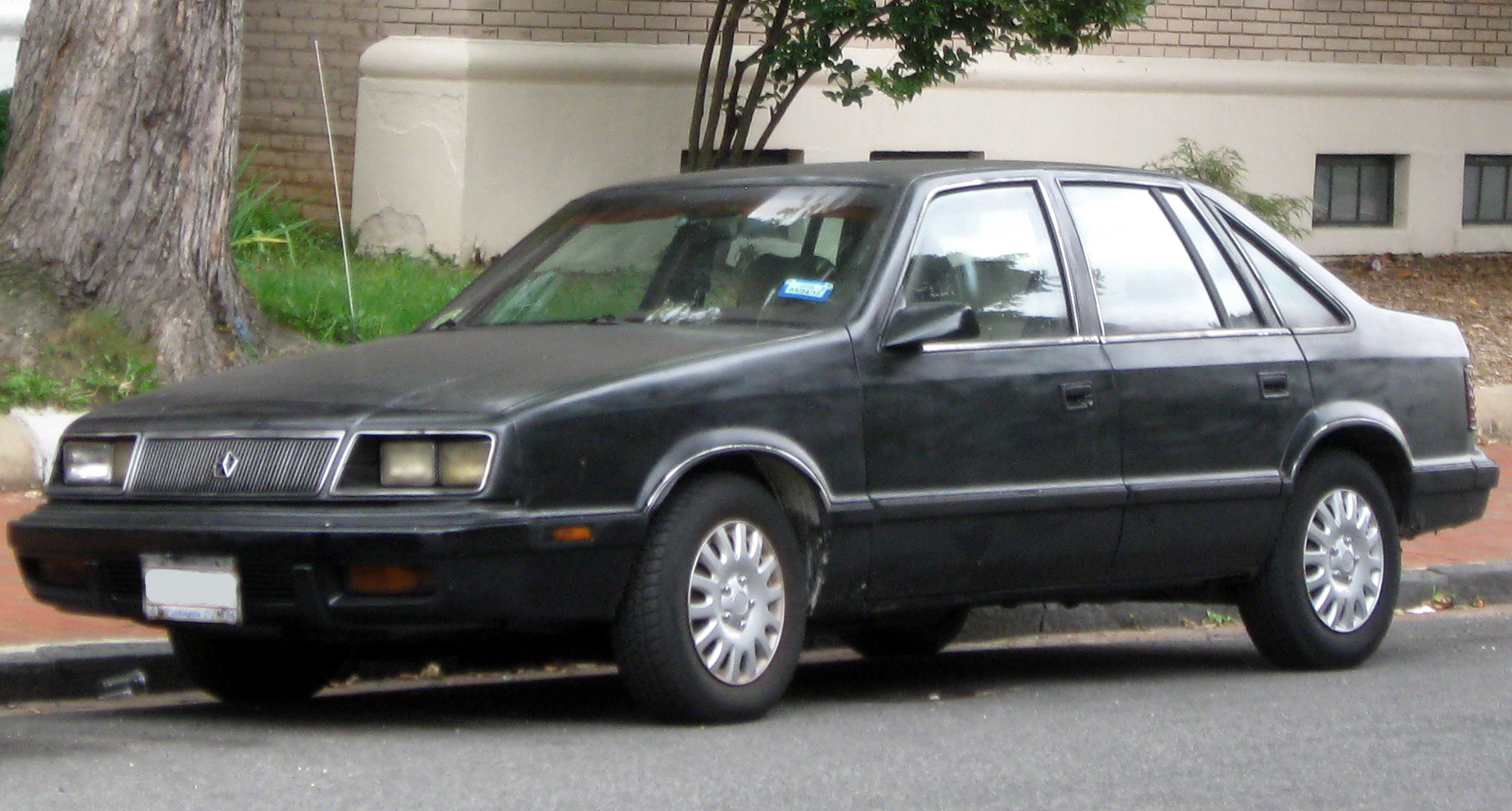

Overview
- Also called: Chrysler GTS
- Production: 1984–1989
- Model years: 1985–1989
- Assembly: Sterling Heights, Michigan, United States

Body and chassis
- Class: Mid-size
- Body style: 5-door hatchback
- Layout: Transverse front-engine, front-wheel drive
- Platform: H-body
- Related: Dodge Lancer; Shelby Lancer

Powertrain
- Engine: 2.2 L K I4; 2.2 L Turbo I I4; 2.2 L Turbo II I4; 2.5 L K I4
- Transmission: 5-speed Getrag A520 manual 5-speed Getrag A555 manual 3-speed A413 automatic

Dimensions
- Wheelbase: 103.1 in (2,619 mm)
- Length: 180.4 in (4,582 mm)
- Width: 68.3 in (1,735 mm)
- Height: 53 in (1,346 mm)

The 1985 LeBaron GTS was a somewhat different car than the standard LeBaron, and was based on the Chrysler H platform. It was available at the same time as the Cadillac Cimarron as a luxury-brand model while offering a similar level of equipment to the small Cadillac. As a 5-door hatchback still derived from the K-car, the GTS (and the similar Dodge Lancer) was more of a performance vehicle than the softer-tuned K-car LeBaron sedan. In base configuration, the car was powered by Chrysler's 2.2 liter inline-4 engine, later replaced by a 2.5 L TBI version generating 100 hp (75 kW). A turbocharged 2.2 L engine producing 146 hp (109 kW) was also available. The GTS moniker was dropped for 1989, the final year of this vehicle's production, after the K-based LeBaron sedan was discontinued after 1988.

=== Trim levels ===
- High Line - 1985–1989
- Premium - 1985–1988
- GTS - 1989 (replaced "Premium" after the "GTS" was dropped from the name of the car)
- "Pacifica" 1986 (replaced by Shelby Lancer in 1987) Limited 500 run

Production Figures:

Chrysler LeBaron Production Figures
| | Coupe | Sedan | Wagon | Convertible | GTS | Yearly Total |
|---|---|---|---|---|---|---|
| 1982 | 27,151 | 42,534 | 7,809 | 12,825 | - | 90,319 |
| 1983 | 18,331 | 30,869 | 10,994 | 9,891 | - | 70,085 |
| 1984 | 24,963 | 47,664 | 11,578 | 16,208 | - | 100,413 |
| 1985 | 24,970 | 43,659 | 7,711 | 16,475 | 60,783 | 153,598 |
| 1986 | 24,761 | 40,116 | 19,684 | 19,684 | 73,557 | 177,802 |
| 1987 | - | 54,678 | 5,880 | - | 39,050 | 99,608 |
| 1988 | - | 24,452 | 2,136 | - | 14,211 | 40,799 |
| Total | 120,176 | 283,972 | 65,792 | 75,083 | 187,601 | 732,624 |

=== European market - the Chrysler GTS ===
After some years of absence, Chrysler officially started offering some models under its brand on the European market in April 1988. One of them was the Chrysler GTS, a rebadged version of the Dodge Lancer ES. Sales figures were moderate.

== Third generation coupe/convertible (1987–1995) ==
Third generation (coupe/convertible)
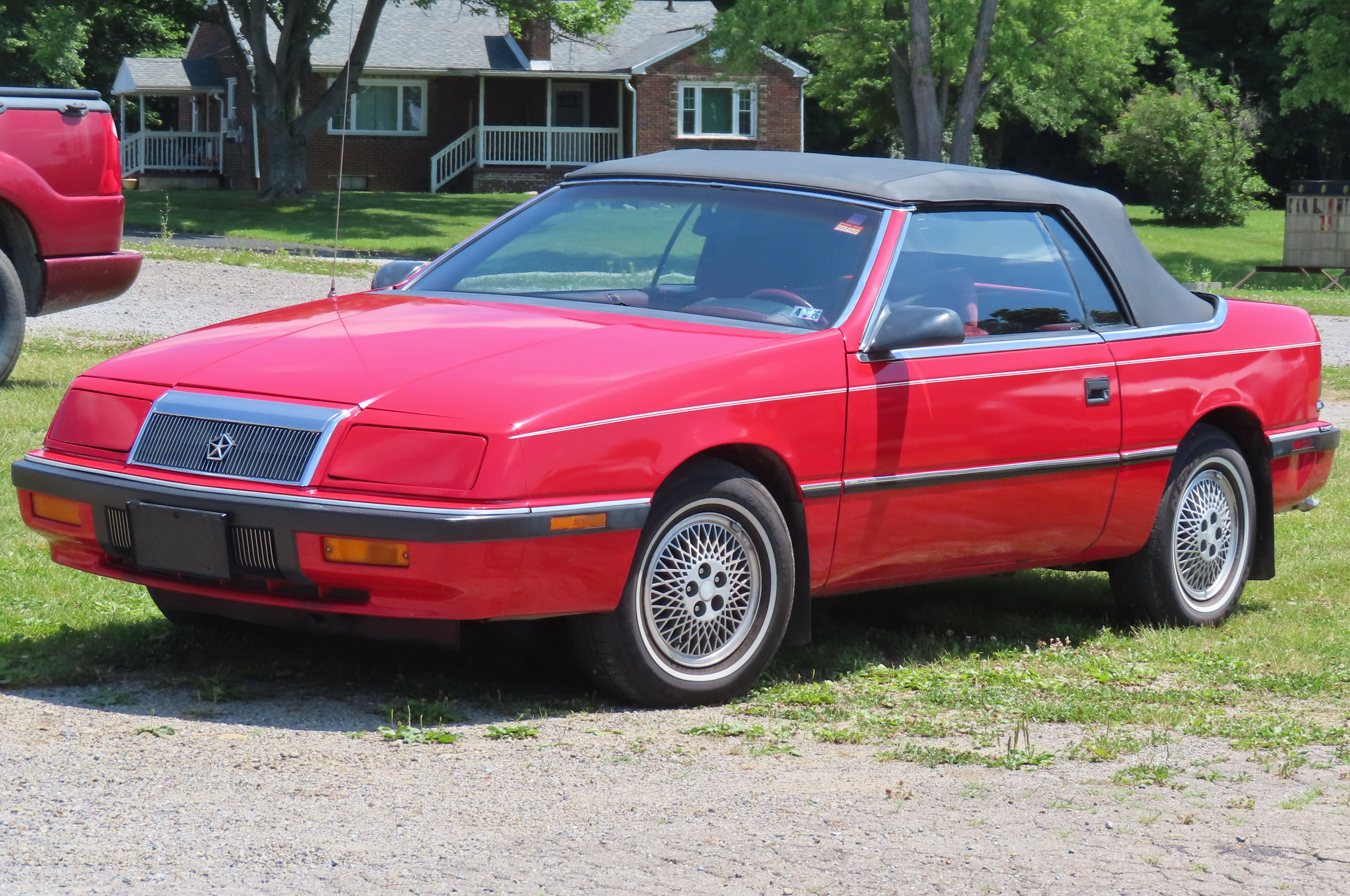

Overview
- Also called: Chrysler Phantom (Mexico)
- Production: 1986–1995
- Model years: 1987–1995
- Assembly: Newark, Delaware, United States (Newark Assembly); St. Louis, Missouri, United States (Saint Louis Assembly); Toluca, Mexico (Toluca Car Assembly)

Body and chassis
- Class: Personal luxury
- Body style: 2-door coupe (1987–93); 2-door convertible (1987–95)
- Layout: Transverse front-engine, front-wheel drive
- Platform: J-body
- Related: Chrysler TC by Maserati

Powertrain
- Engine: 2.2 L Turbo I I4; 2.2 L Turbo II I4; 2.2 L Turbo III I4 (Mexico only); 2.5 L K I4; 2.5 L Turbo I4; 3.0 L Mitsubishi 6G72 V6
- Transmission: 2.2 and 2.5 L engines: 5-speed Getrag A520 manual; 5-speed Getrag A523 manual; 5-speed Getrag A555 manual; 3-speed A413 automatic; 3.0 L V6 engine: 5-speed Getrag A543 manual; 5-speed Getrag A568 manual; 3-speed A670 automatic; 4-speed A604 automatic

Dimensions
- Wheelbase: 100.5 in (2,553 mm) (1992–95 coupe); 100.6 in (2,555 mm) (1992–95 convertible); 100.3 in (2,548 mm) (1987–1991 coupe); 100.4 in (2,550 mm) (1987–1991 convertible)
- Length: 184.8 in (4,694 mm)
- Width: 69.2 in (1,758 mm) (1992–95); 68.5 in (1,740 mm) (1987–1991)
- Height: 51.2 in (1,300 mm) (1992–95); 50.9 in (1,293 mm) (1987–1991)

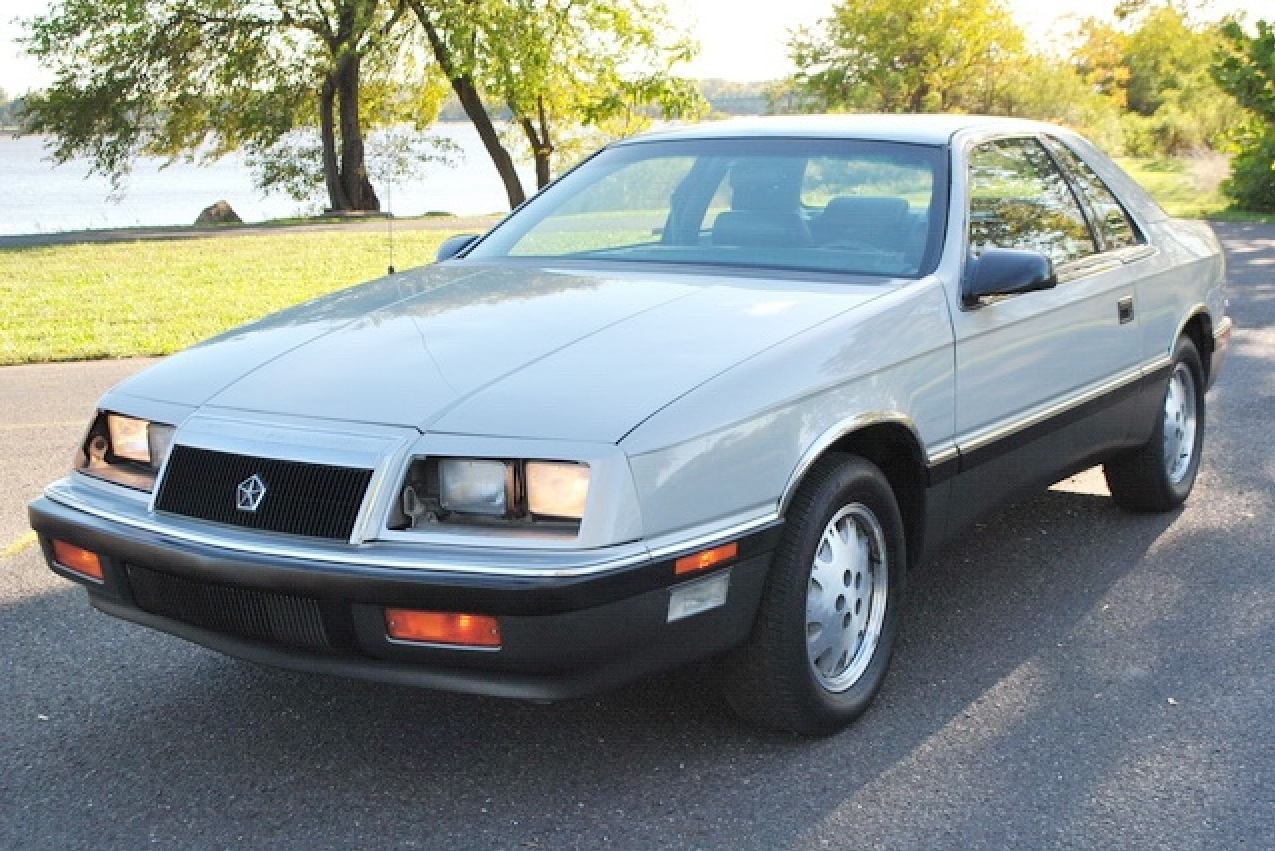
1987–1992 LeBaron Coupe (headlight covers open)

After discontinuing the first-generation LeBaron coupe and convertible in 1986, Chrysler released a new LeBaron for 1987, built on the J platform (a K platform derivative) and available as a coupe or convertible. The new LeBaron was more modern and aerodynamic than its boxy predecessor, and was quite stylish for its day, featuring headlights hidden behind retractable metal covers and a waterfall grille, steeply raked windshield, full-width taillight lenses (only the edges lit up), and curved, Coke bottle-style rocker panels. The LeBaron was equipped with a trip and fuel economy computer as well as full instrumentation. In Mexico, these models were marketed as the Chrysler Phantom. The available engines were the stock 2.2-liter and 2.5-liter, naturally aspirated or turbocharged, and for the 1990 model year, a 3.0-liter Mitsubishi V6 became available, although the Mexican Chrysler Phantom R/T DOHC 16V also offered the same 2.2-liter turbo engine as used in the U.S. market Dodge Spirit R/T.

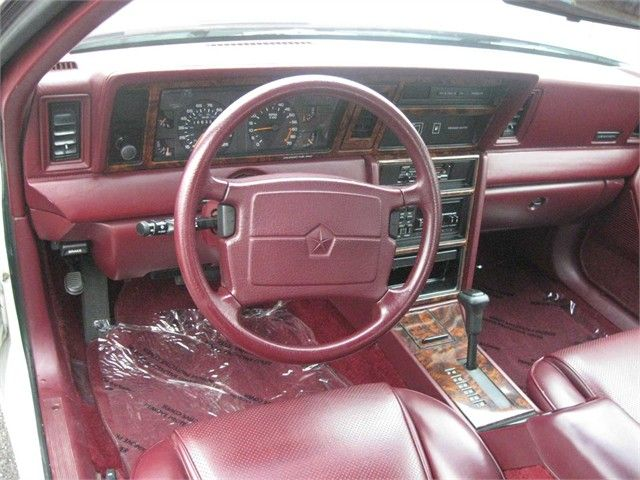
1989 interior

For 1990, the LeBaron's interior was refreshed, featuring a new dashboard, gauge cluster, door panels and center console design. All of the new components were designed to be smoother and more flowing than the comparatively boxy 1987-89 interior style, making it more in tune with the "aero" revolution of the early 1990s. The 1992 LeBaron coupes and convertibles could be ordered with a new "sport package", which featured a monochrome appearance including body-colored grille, accent stripe, and decklid logo. The package also included 14-inch "lace" style wheel covers and a black strip below the taillights in place of chrome, with special blacked-out window moldings on coupe models.

=== 1993 facelift ===
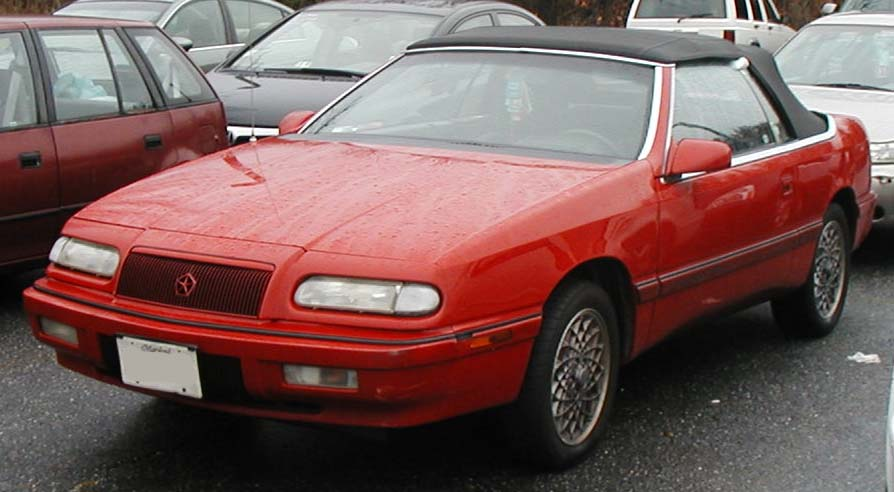
1993–1995 Chrysler LeBaron convertible

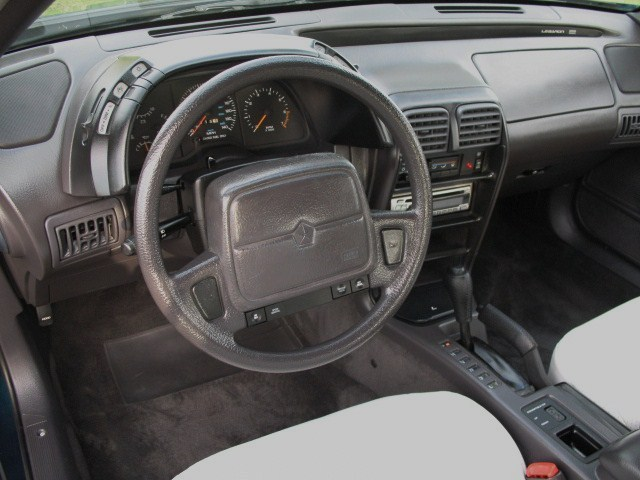
1994 interior (aftermarket radio)

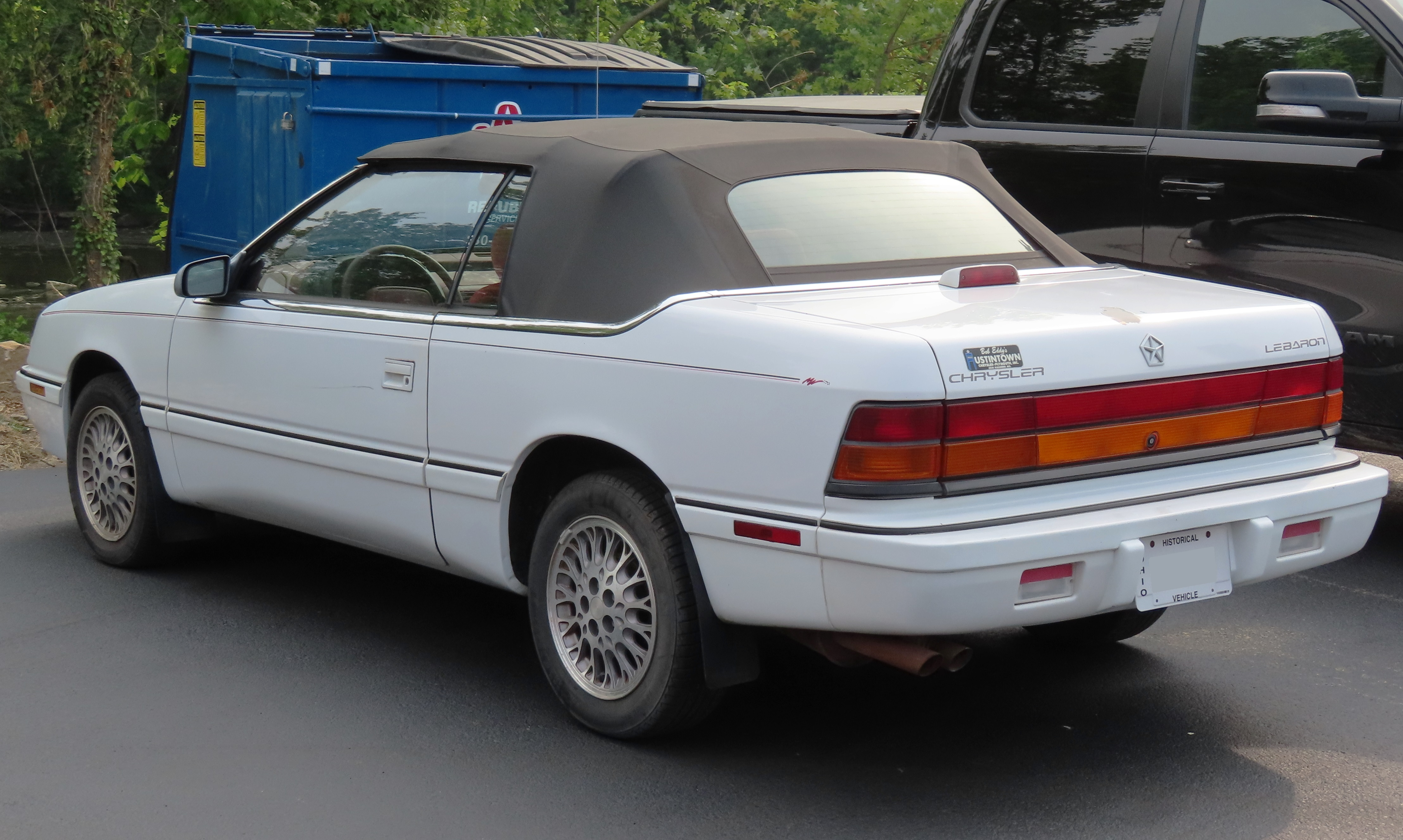
1993-1995 Chrysler LeBaron convertible, rear styling

For the 1993 model year, the LeBaron received a slight facelift. The hidden headlamps of the 1987-1992 models were removed in favor of less costly, flush-mounted replaceable-bulb headlamps. New wheel styles were available, and all models received the amber rear turn signals introduced on the deluxe 1992 models. For 1994, a passenger side airbag became standard on all models. Also new for 1994 was the "Bright LX" decor package which included a "bright" chrome grille, "bright" chrome badging, and "bright" chrome molding inserts, as opposed to being body-colored on the GTC.

The available engines were a naturally aspirated 2.5 L and a turbocharged 2.2 and 2.5 L versions of Chrysler's inline-four, and the 3.0 L Mitsubishi V6 making a 141 hp (105 kW) in this application. The turbocharged engines were dropped from the lineup for the 1993 model year. The coupe was discontinued after 1993. For the last two model years, the 3.0 was the only available engine. The convertible was discontinued after 1995 to make way for the new Chrysler Sebring coupes and convertibles for 1995 and 1996 respectively.

=== Trim levels: 1987–1995 ===
Throughout its lifetime, the LeBaron convertible/coupe was available in a number of trim levels. For its first year, the LeBaron was available in Highline and Premium, typical Chrysler trims at the time. The number of trims grew, peaking in 1990, with six available. After that, the number decreased until just two trim levels remained for 1995.

- 1987: Highline, Premium
- 1988: Highline, Premium, GT
- 1989: GTS Turbo, GT Turbo, GTC Turbo, Highline, Premium
- 1990: GT, GT Turbo, GTC Turbo, Highline, Highline Turbo, Premium
- 1991: GTC, GTC Turbo, Highline, Highline Turbo, Premium LX
- 1992: GTC, GTC Turbo, Highline, Highline Turbo, LX
- 1993: GTC, Highline, LX
- 1994: GTC, LX
- 1995: GTC, LX

=== Export ===
The LeBaron coupe/convertible was part of Chrysler's export push and was regularly available across Europe. Springs and shocks were somewhat firmer on European-market cars. The initial European lineup was made up of the naturally aspirated 2.5 and the turbocharged 2.2; both were offered with a 5-speed manual or a 3-speed automatic. Power is 98 and 148 PS (72 and 109 kW; 97 and 146 hp) respectively. In mid-1988, the turbocharged 2.2 was partially replaced by the 2.5 Turbo, with power slightly lower at 146 PS (107 kW; 144 hp). The 2.2 Turbo received an intercooler, which boosted maximum power to 177 PS (130 kW; 175 hp). Called the LeBaron GTC, it was not offered with the automatic. Both turbo versions were discontinued during 1989; the 2.5 Turbo returned (only with the five-speed manual transmission) some time during 1990. The new version produces 155 PS (114 kW; 153 hp) at 4700 rpm, but it was discontinued yet again in 1991. The 3.0-liter Mitsubishi V6 engine was introduced to European buyers in mid-1989, and was only available with the four-speed automatic. It produces somewhat less power than the American models; 136 PS (100 kW; 134 hp) at 5200 rpm. The top speed was 182 km/h (113 mph) and the 0–100 km/h (62 mph) sprint took 10.8 seconds. After the 2.5 Turbo was discontinued in 1991, the V6 remained the only regular option until the LeBaron Coupé/Convertible ended European sales in mid-1994.

=== Racing ===
Several ARCA (one tier down from NASCAR cup racing) teams built LeBaron-based race cars (supported by a revitalized Chrysler Direct Connection performance parts division) and ran them from 1988 to 1998.

Production Figures:

Chrysler LeBaron Production Figures
| | Coupe | Convertible | Yearly Total |
|---|---|---|---|
| 1987 | 75,415 | 8,025 | 83,440 |
| 1988 | 48,671 | 38,197 | 86,868 |
| 1989 | 53,504 | 37,489 | 90,993 |
| 1990 | 20,106 | 38,928 | 59,034 |
| 1991 | 10,771 | 29,074 | 39,845 |
| 1992 | 5,656 | 40,284 | 45,940 |
| 1993 | 6,007 | 26,776 | 32,783 |
| 1994 | - | 37,052 | 37,052 |
| 1995 | - | 35,760 | 35,760 |
| Total | 220,130 | 291,585 | 511,715 |

== Third generation sedan (1990–1994) ==
Third generation (sedan)
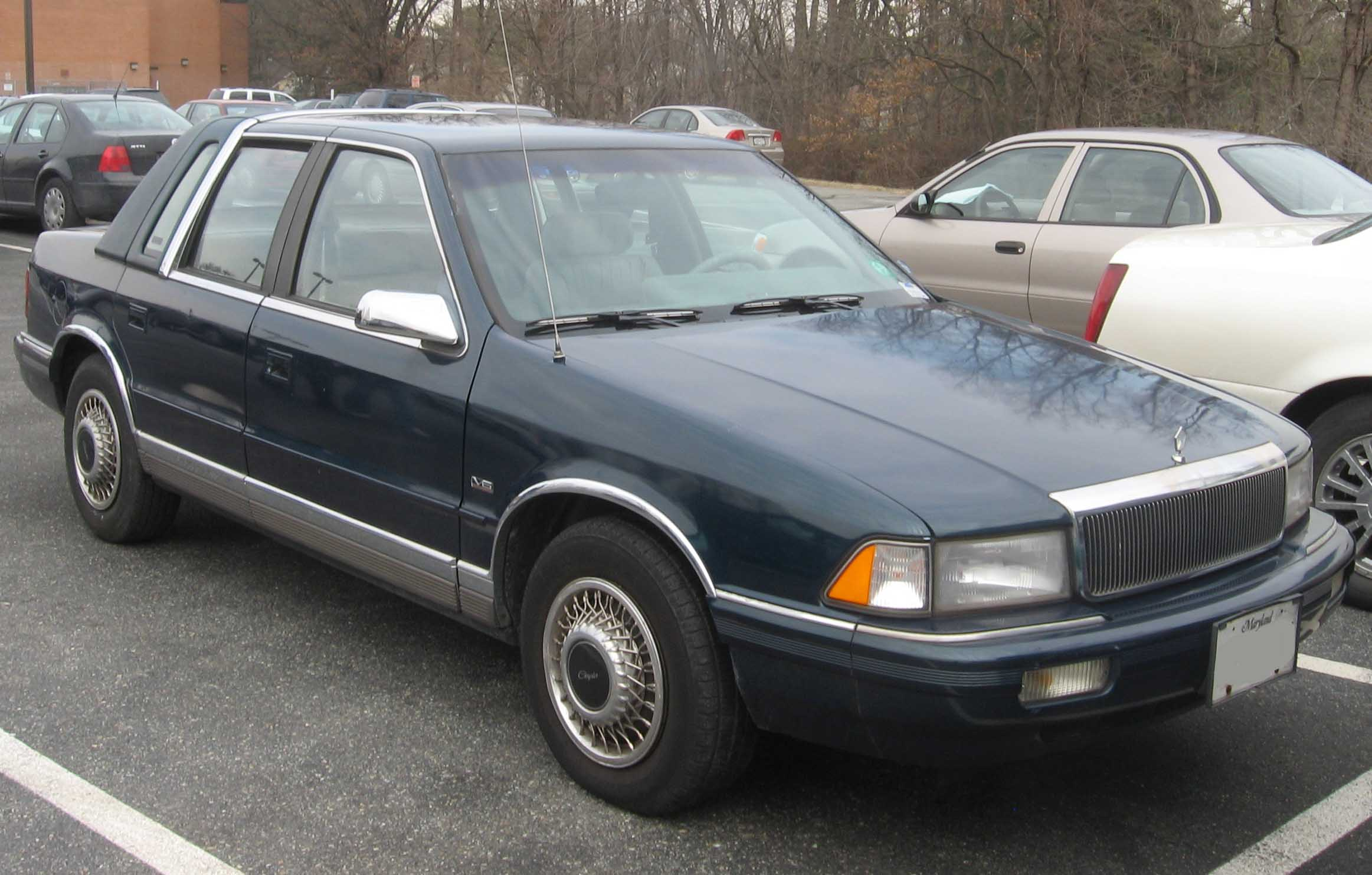

Overview
- Also called: Chrysler New Yorker (Mexico)
- Production: 1989–1994
- Model years: 1990–1994
- Assembly: Newark, Delaware, United States (Newark Assembly); Toluca, Mexico (Toluca Car Assembly); Valencia, Carabobo, Venezuela

Body and chassis
- Class: Mid-size
- Body style: 4-door sedan
- Layout: Transverse front-engine, front-wheel drive
- Platform: AA-body
- Related: Chrysler Saratoga (Export only); Dodge Spirit; Plymouth Acclaim

Powertrain
- Engine: 2.5 L Chrysler I4; 3.0 L Mitsubishi 6G72 V6
- Transmission: 2.5 L engines: 5-speed Getrag A523 manual; 3-speed A413 automatic; 3 L engines: 5-speed Getrag A543 manual; 5-speed Getrag A555 manual; 5-speed Getrag A568 manual; 3-speed A670 automatic; 4-speed A604 automatic

Dimensions
- Wheelbase: 103.5 in (2,629 mm)
- Length: 182.7 in (4,641 mm)
- Width: 68.1 in (1,730 mm)
- Height: 53.7 in (1,364 mm)
- Curb weight: 2,971 lb (1,348 kg)

Chronology
- Successor: Chrysler Cirrus

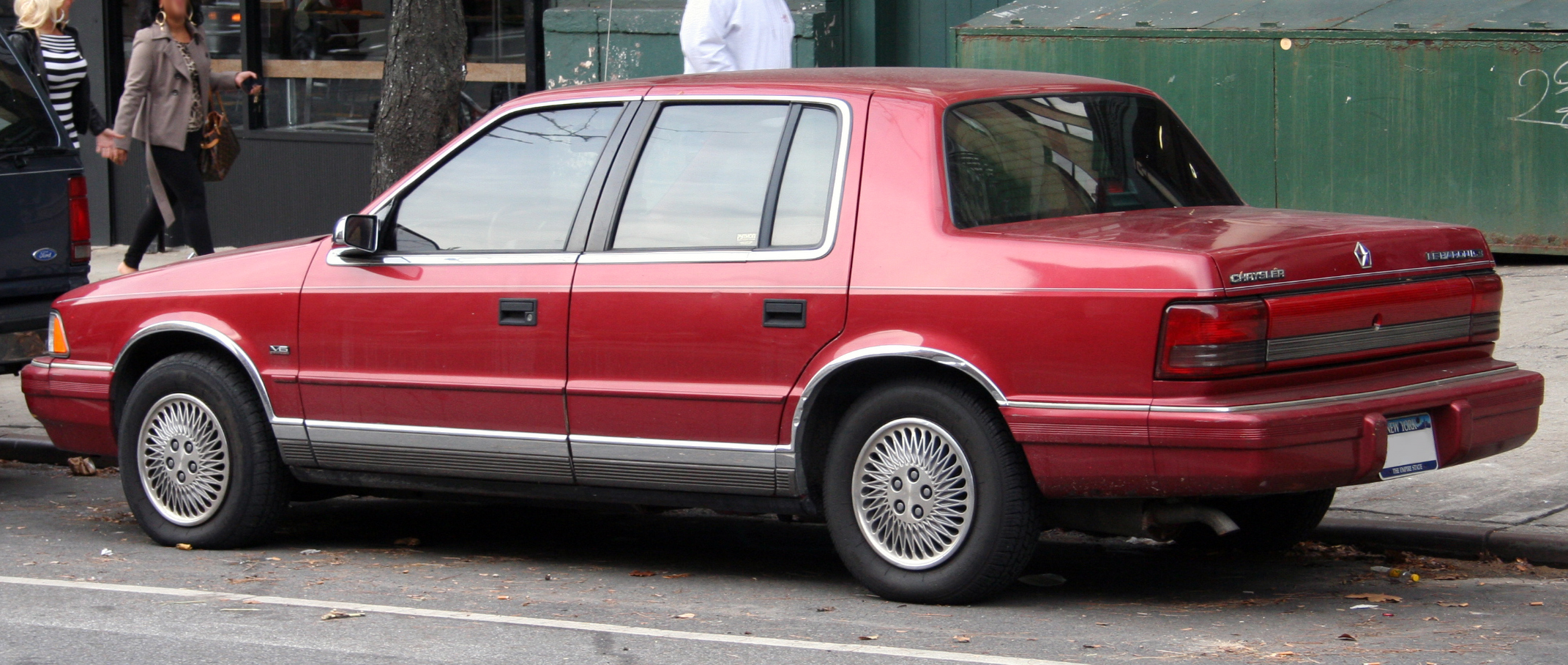
1992 Chrysler LeBaron LE

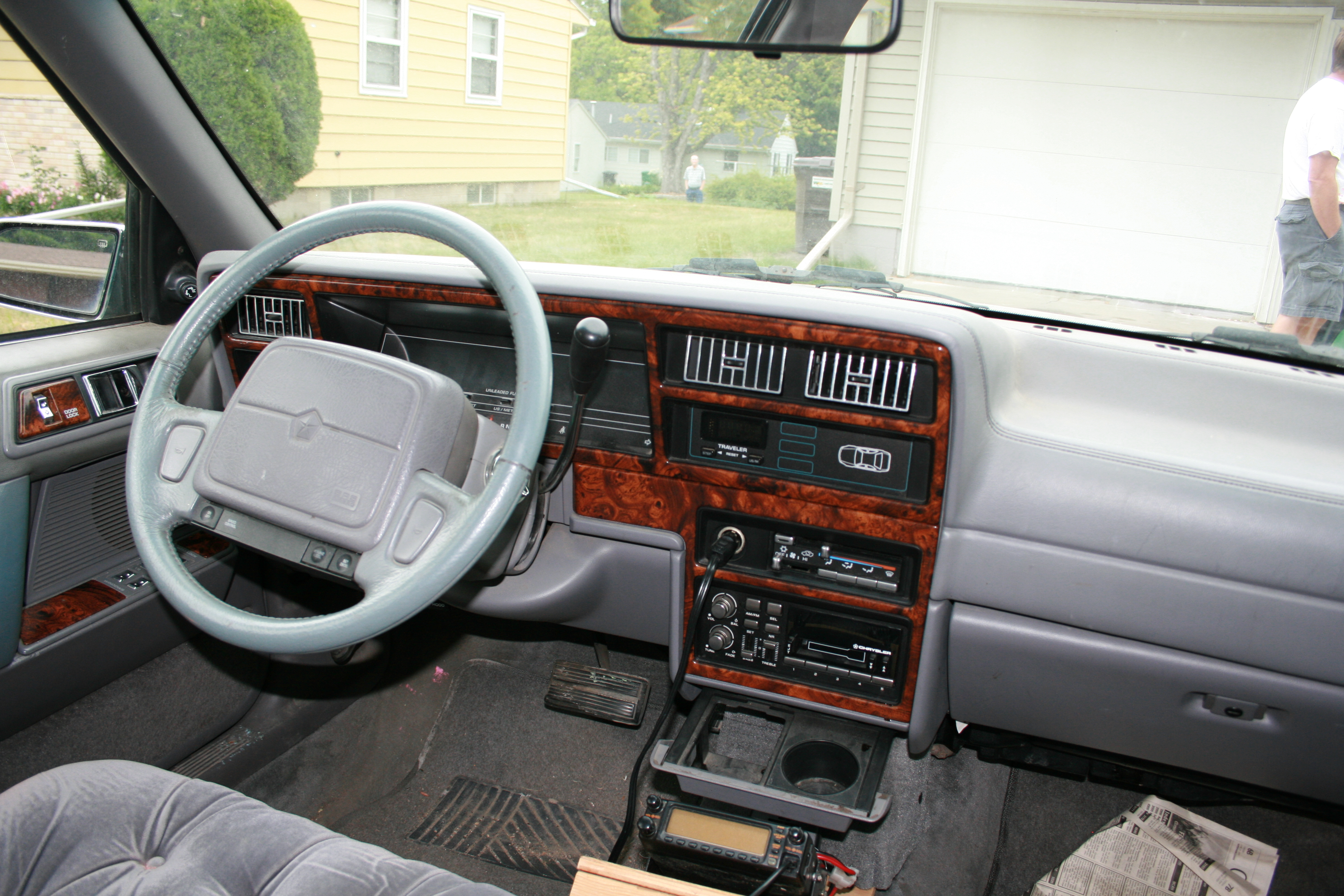
Interior

The last LeBaron sedan was built on the front wheel drive AA platform, another K derivative, as junior level sedan to the more upscale New Yorker. It offered rebadged versions under the Dodge Spirit and Plymouth Acclaim nameplates, and the three differed mostly in detail and trim choices, as well as the European Chrysler Saratoga and Chrysler New Yorker in Mexico (1990-1994).

Theoretically, as historically was the case in this era versus its Dodge and Plymouth siblings, the LeBaron was marketed as the luxury version, reflecting the Chrysler brand's flagship status. In reality, however, there was considerable overlap amongst the three in available trim, equipment and features. Launched in a single trim, the top-line LeBaron Landau model offered a padded vinyl half-roof with smaller "formal" backlight, as well as unique button-tufted bench seats. All LeBaron sedans came with a standard driver's side airbag, and could seat up to six passengers.

Due to Chrysler's efforts to refocus the Plymouth brand at the value end and to expand the Chrysler brand's sales, the Plymouth Acclaim would lose its mid-range LE and top-line LX trims for 1992. They were instead added to the LeBaron lineup as the base and LX trims, below the former standard trim, which was now called Landau. The LX, which retained the Acclaim's taillights instead of the LeBaron's full-width treatment was available for 1992 only, and now the only model to feature the V6 as standard. For 1993, the LeBaron sedan received new rear lights, which incorporated the reversing lamps previously located in the bumper fascia. Trim levels were reduced to just the base model, renamed LE, and the luxury Landau. The LeBaron sedan was discontinued on May 18, 1994, while the Dodge Spirit and Plymouth Acclaim continued production until December 21, 1994. The Chrysler LeBaron was replaced by the "Cloud Car" Chrysler Cirrus.

=== Safety ===
In 1994, the U.S. National Highway Traffic Safety Administration (NHTSA) rated the LeBaron a 4 out of 5 for driver side and a 3 out of 5 for passenger side frontal impact occupant protection.

=== Trim levels ===
- base - 1990–1992
- LX - 1992
- Landau - 1992–1994
- LE - 1993–1994

Production Figures:

Chrysler LeBaron Production Figures
| | Yearly Production |
|---|---|
| 1990 | 27,312 |
| 1991 | 17,752 |
| 1992 | 33,862 |
| 1993 | 26,474 |
| 1994 | 35,760 |
| Total | 141,160 |

== Mexican market ==
M and K-platform cars were assembled in the Toluca, Mexico facility. The M-platform LeBaron was sold in Mexico from the 1977 to the 1982 model years. The K-car LeBaron was also produced in Toluca and was sold for the 1983 through 1987 model years. There were no K-platform convertibles offered from the factory.

Chrysler Phantom was the Mexican-market version of the J-Body LeBaron Coupe. There were no convertibles of the J-body 2-door for the Mexican market. Phantoms were Chrysler's top-of-the-line model in Mexico and generally sold with a higher trim level than their US counterparts; the Phantom was also only ever available with the more powerful, turbocharged engines. Chrysler Phantoms were marketed from 1987 until 1994, with the first cars delivered in December 1986. A more powerful R/T version (similar to the American LeBaron GTC but using a higher-tuned turbo engine) was also available in 1992 and 1993. The Phantom R/T originally received the 2.5-liter 175 hp (130 kW) Turbo II engine, coupled to a three-speed automatic, but this was quickly changed to the 224 hp (167 kW) Turbo III engine with a five-speed Getrag manual transmission.

The Mexican AA-body Chrysler LeBaron 4-door sedan was called the New Yorker (all of them with Landau roof), and the "K" body (slightly shorter) was reserved for the 4-door LeBaron's, which were sold in two trim levels, one with Landau roof and leather, and the other one without those two options.

== Sources ==
- Coachbuilt: LeBaron Carrossiers - 1920–1925, LeBaron Inc. - 1925–1928, LeBaron-Detroit - 1928-1942
- Coachbuilt: Briggs Manufacturing Co. - 1909-1954
- Conceptcarz: Chrysler LeBaron news
- Allpar: LeBaron Coupe
- Consumer Guide: 1990-1995 LeBaron coupe/convertible reviews
- Consumer Guide: 1990-1994 LeBaron Sedan reviews
- Front-Runners.net - LeBaron Road Test (PDF)
