= Chrysler J platform =

Two automobile platforms from Chrysler Corporation

The J platform was a designation used for two automobile platforms from Chrysler Corporation in the 1980s.

The first was a rear-wheel drive platform, in production from 1980. It was very similar to the 4-door Chrysler F platform and Chrysler M platform.

The J platform was only used for coupés between 1980 and 1983:

- 1980–1983 Chrysler Cordoba
- 1980–1983 Dodge Mirada
- 1981–1983 Chrysler Imperial.

A second, unrelated, AJ platform was a variant of the front-wheel drive K platform produced between 1987 and 1995, which made its debut with the introduction of the newly redesigned Chrysler LeBaron coupe and convertible.
