= Saint Louis Assembly =

Chrysler automobile factory

- Operated: 1959–2009
- Location: Fenton, Missouri
- Coordinates: 38.5483°N 90.4594°W
- Industry: Automotive
- Products: Automobiles
- Area: 300 acres (1.2 km^{2})
- Owner: Chrysler
- Defunct: 2009; 17 years ago

Saint Louis Assembly was a Chrysler automobile factory in Fenton, Missouri. The "South" plant opened in 1959, while the "North" portion opened in 1966. The Saint Louis Factory was built to accommodate Chrysler's new Chrysler B platform allowing the company to build subcompact vehicles. Saint Louis North was the home of minivan production from 1987 through 1995, when it was converted to build the Dodge Ram pickup truck. Minivan production was switched to the South plant, which had been shut down since 1991, in 1995 and continued there through the 2007 model year.

On December 13, 2005, DaimlerChrysler announced that it would spend US$1 billion upgrading the two Saint Louis plants to be more flexible and efficient. This process was expected to occur between 2006 and 2010. On June 30, 2008, Chrysler LLC announced plans to shutter the South plant, consolidating all minivan manufacturing in Windsor, Ontario, Canada.

Production at the North plant was shut down, along with other Chrysler factories, when the company filed for bankruptcy on April 30, 2009. Although production briefly resumed the last week of June 2009, the plant was later closed for good in early July 2009. Both plants were razed in 2011.

In 2013, the 300-acre site was floated as a possibility for the site for a new stadium for the St. Louis Rams if plans to renovate Edward Jones Dome did not materialize. The Rams ultimately chose to return to Southern California. The team formally filed its request to leave St. Louis for Los Angeles on 4 January 2016. On January 12, 2016, the NFL approved the Rams' request for relocation to Los Angeles for the 2016 NFL season.

In October 2016, groundbreaking began for the $222 million Fenton Logistics Park by KP Development. It includes two million square feet of office, warehouse, and industrial space.

== Vehicles produced ==
Some of models produced at the North and South plants included:

- 1960–1966 Dodge Dart/Lancer/Plymouth Valiant
- 1964–1966 Plymouth Barracuda
- 1965–1976 Dodge Coronet/Plymouth Belvedere
- 1968–1974 Dodge Charger
- 1971–1980 Dodge Sportsman/Dodge Tradesman (North plant)
- 1973–1976 Dodge Dart/Plymouth Valiant
- 1974–1980 Plymouth Voyager (North plant)
- 1976–1977 Dodge Aspen/Plymouth Volare
- 1977–1979 Chrysler LeBaron/Dodge Diplomat
- 1978–1987 Plymouth Caravelle (Canadian M-body)
- 1981–1986 Dodge Aries/Plymouth Reliant (2-door sedans)
- 1982–1983 Dodge 400 (coupe/convertible)
- 1982–1986 Chrysler LeBaron
- 1984 – Mid-1987 Chrysler Fifth Avenue/Dodge Diplomat/Plymouth Gran Fury
- 1983–1986 Chrysler Executive
- 1983–1986 Dodge 600/Plymouth Caravelle (coupe/convertible)
- 1984–1986 Chrysler Laser/Dodge Daytona
- 1987–1991 Chrysler LeBaron (coupe and convertible)
- 1987–1991 Dodge Daytona
- 1987–2000 Plymouth Voyager
- 1987–2006 Dodge Caravan
- 1990–2008 Chrysler Town & Country
- 1995–2009 Dodge Ram
- 2000–2003 Chrysler Voyager
