= Chrysler E platform =

Two car ranges manufactured by Chrysler

The Chrysler E platform referred to two separate and unrelated car ranges.

The "E" designation was initially used for the following rear wheel drive cars in the 1970s:

- 1970–1974 Dodge Challenger, 110-inch (2,794 mm) wheelbase
- 1970–1974 Plymouth Barracuda, 108-inch (2,743 mm) wheelbase

The designation was later used for an extended version (hence "E") of the front wheel drive Chrysler K platform during the 1980s for the following cars:

- 1983–1988 Dodge 600
- 1985–1988 Plymouth Caravelle
- 1983–1984 Chrysler E-Class
- 1983–1987 Chrysler New Yorker
- 1988 Chrysler New Yorker Turbo
- 1983–1986 Chrysler Executive

== See also ==
- Chrysler platforms
