= Dodge Diplomat =

Motor vehicle

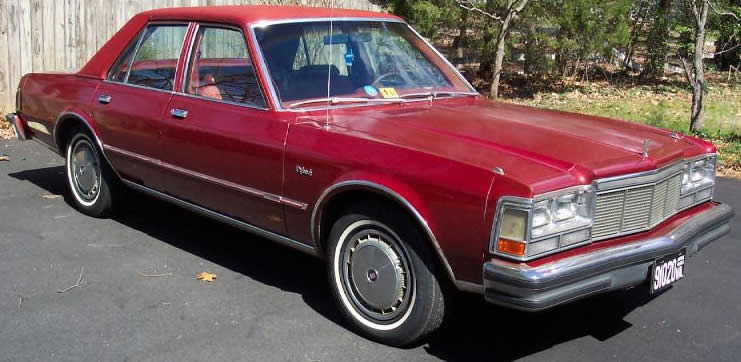
- 1977 Dodge Diplomat four-door sedan

Overview
- Manufacturer: Dodge (Chrysler)
- Also called: Dodge Coronet (Colombia); Dodge Dart (Mexico); Dodge Magnum (Mexico); Plymouth Caravelle (Canada; 1977–1981); Plymouth Gran Fury
- Production: 1977–December 1988
- Model years: 1977–1989
- Assembly: United States: Fenton, Missouri (Saint Louis Assembly); United States: Kenosha, Wisconsin (Kenosha Assembly: 1987–1988); United States: Newark, Delaware (Newark Assembly); Canada: Windsor, Ontario (Windsor Assembly); Colombia: Bogotá

Body and chassis
- Class: Mid-size car
- Body style: 4-door sedan (1977–1989); 5-door station wagon (1978–1981); 2-door coupe (1977–1981)
- Layout: FR layout
- Platform: M-body
- Related: Chrysler Fifth Avenue; Chrysler LeBaron; Dodge Aspen; Chrysler New Yorker; Chrysler Town & Country; Monteverdi Sierra

Powertrain
- Engine: 225 cu in (3.7 L) Slant 6 I6; 318 cu in (5.2 L) LA V8; 360 cu in (5.9 L) LA V8 (1978–1979)
- Transmission: 4-speed A833 manual 3-speed A727 automatic 3-speed A904 automatic 3-speed A999 automatic

Dimensions
- Wheelbase: Coupe: 112.7 in (2,863 mm); 1977–1979, 108.7 in (2,761 mm); 1980–1981, Sedan & wagon: 112.7 in (2,863 mm); 1977–1989 (wagons through 1981 only)
- Length: Coupe: 1977–1979: 204.1 in (5,184 mm); 1980–1981: 201.2 in (5,110 mm); Sedan: 1977–1983: 206.1 in (5,235 mm); 1987–1989: 204.6 in (5,197 mm); Wagon: 205.5 in (5,220 mm)
- Width: Coupe & wagon: 74.2 in (1,885 mm); 1980–1983 Sedan: 72.8 in (1,849 mm); 1987–1989 Sedan: 72.4 in (1,839 mm)
- Height: Coupe: 53.4 in (1,356 mm); Wagon: 55.5 in (1,410 mm); Sedan: 55.1 in (1,400 mm)

Chronology
- Predecessor: Dodge Dart
- Successor: Dodge Monaco

The Dodge Diplomat is an intermediate car that was produced by Dodge from the 1977 to 1989 model years. Introduced as a higher-priced companion model to the Dodge Aspen as Dodge phased out the long-running Dodge Dart, the Diplomat ultimately replaced the Aspen (alongside the smaller Dodge Aries). Initially offered as a two-door coupe and four-door sedan, the model line also added a five-door station wagon for 1978. From 1982 onward, the model line became offered solely as a four-door sedan.

For its entire production, the Dodge Diplomat used the rear-wheel drive Chrysler M platform (an evolution of the F platform introduced by the Dodge Aspen), shared with multiple model lines. Initially launched as the counterpart of the Chrysler LeBaron (the first mid-size Chrysler), it was also sold in Canada as the Plymouth Caravelle and in Latin America as the Dodge Coronet. For 1981 and 1982, the model was sold as the Dodge Dart. For 1982, the Diplomat became the counterpart of the nearly identical Plymouth Gran Fury and the flagship Chrysler Fifth Avenue.

Following the 1989 model year, Dodge retired the model line, replacing it with the front-wheel drive Dodge Monaco. The Diplomat would be the final Dodge vehicle sold with a carbureted engine and its last rear-wheel drive car (with the exception of the Viper) sold until the 2005 introduction of the Dodge Magnum. Alongside its Plymouth and Chrysler counterparts, the Dodge Diplomat marked the final vehicles of the intermediate segment, largely eliminated at the beginning of the decade by downsizing.

== Background ==
The Diplomat name was originally used by Dodge on 2-door hardtop models from 1950 to 1954. It was also used on the export version of the DeSoto from 1946 through 1962. From 1975 through 1977, the Diplomat name was also used on a trim package available on the Royal Monaco two-door hardtop. Starting with the 1977 model year, the Diplomat became a full model line, rather than as the name of a particular body style.

== First generation (1977) ==
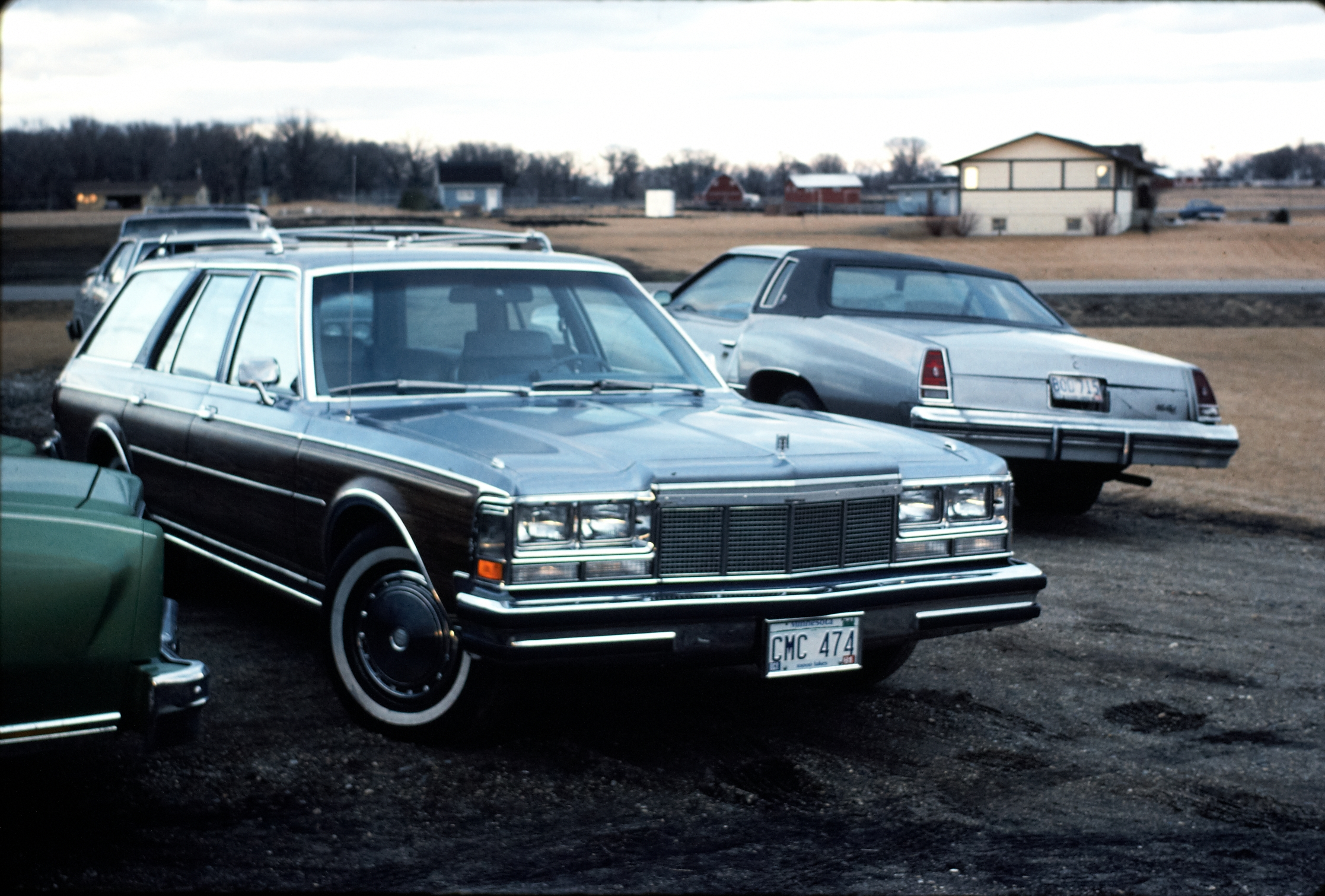
1978 Dodge Diplomat wagon

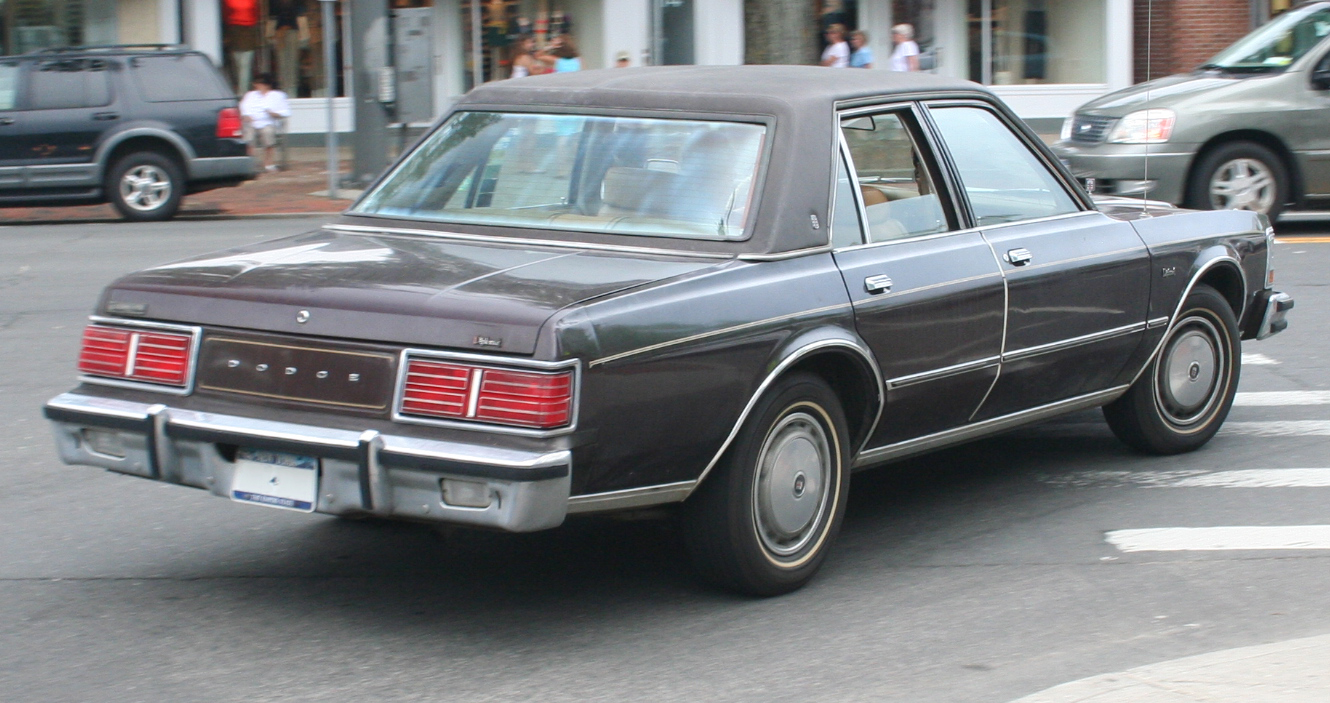
1979 Dodge Diplomat sedan

Introduced as a late 1977 model during spring 1977, the first generation Diplomats were a longer, designated as Chrysler's M Body cars sharing much with the Chrysler LeBaron, both of which shared much with F-body Aspen and Plymouth Volare. The chassis and mechanical components are similar with doors and various other body panels interchangeable with the Aspens. Unique to the Diplomat were the front and rear header panels, bumpers, hood and trunk lid. Larger taillights extended into the rear hatch of the station wagon. The station wagons were shorter than the sedans and coupes, which had unique bodywork with a longer rear overhang. The station wagon, introduced for the 1978 model year, used the same rear sheetmetal as the Aspen/Volaré, albeit with its own wraparound taillights.

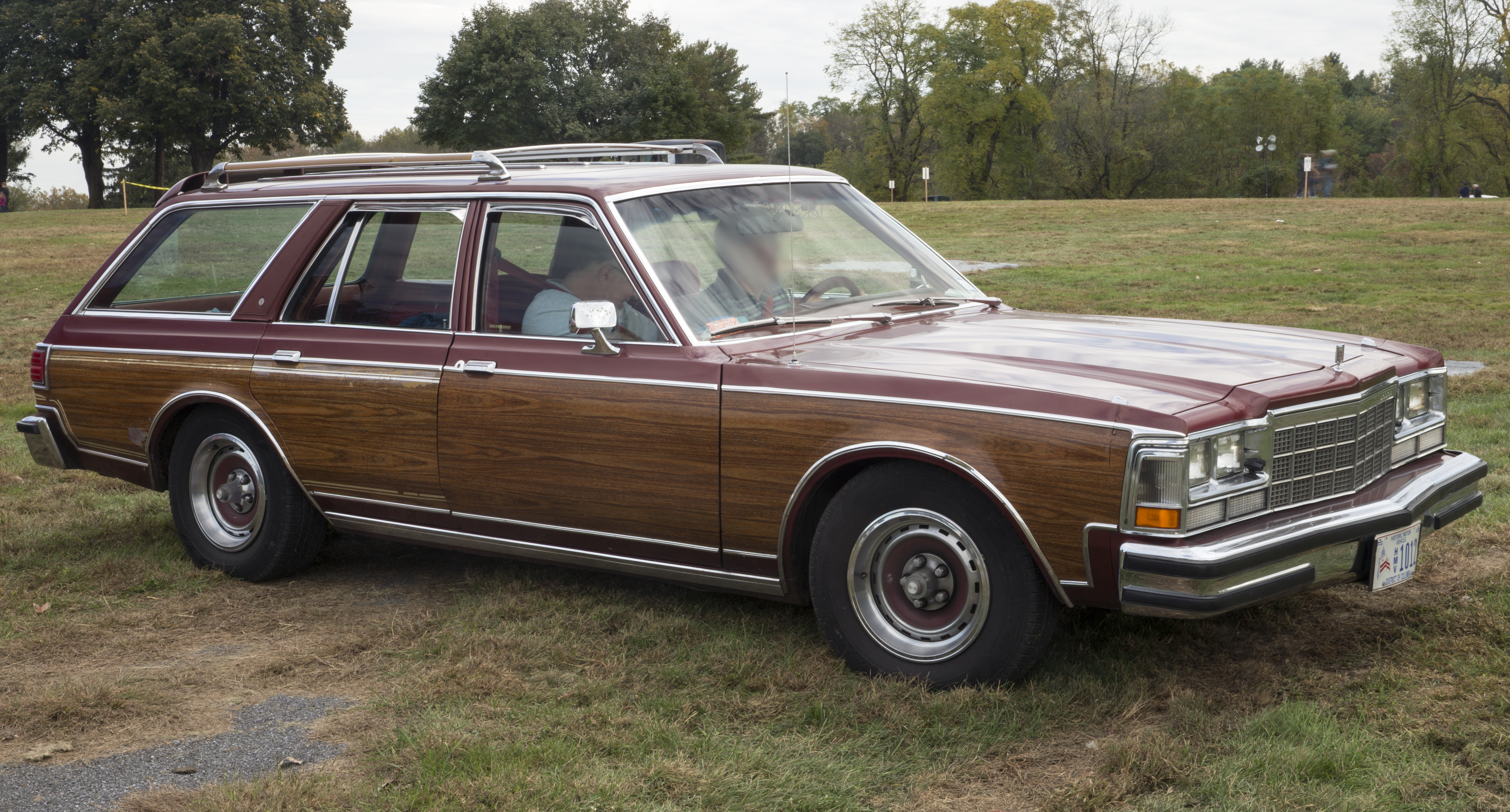
1979 Dodge Diplomat Salon Station Wagon

The first year models were available in base and Medallion trim levels; the base engine was the 318 Lean Burn V8 developing 145 hp (108 kW) and the 110 hp (82 kW) Slant Six was a credit option. A vinyl roof was standard on sedans, while a simulated landau roof cover was an option on coupes. For 1978 the Slant Six with a four-speed manual transmission became the base drivetrain, and the station wagon was added. The wagon featured "teakwood"-grain body appliques (a delete option) and was only available in base trim. The sedans and coupes continued largely unchanged, but a low-cost "Diplomat S" was added. This model was offered for one year, and the 3,322 produced represented only about 5% of overall Diplomat production in 1978. The V8's output dropped by five horsepower, but on the other hand, a 155 hp (116 kW) 360 cu in (5.9 L) V8 became a new option.

For the 1979 model year, the Diplomat received a minor facelift. The grille was now divided into three rows of eight rectangular openings with an internal crosshatch pattern and a broad band on top. The sedan and coupe taillights were also altered, now with a horizontal theme while divided down the middle. The lineup was rearranged, with the base model decontented and a Salon model (corresponding to last year's base version) fitting in the middle below the Medallion. The new base model did not receive the padded vinyl roof (sedans). Coupes had a new landau top design, with much smaller rear side windows. The station wagon came in Salon trim, without any actual changes in equipment. The Slant Six, meanwhile, was available with a single-barrel carburetor and 100 hp (75 kW). V8 outputs dropped by five horsepower, to 135 and 150 hp (101 and 112 kW) respectively, but optional was a four-barrel 360 producing 195 hp (145 kW). This was the last year for the 360 engine in the Diplomat.

== Second generation (1980) ==
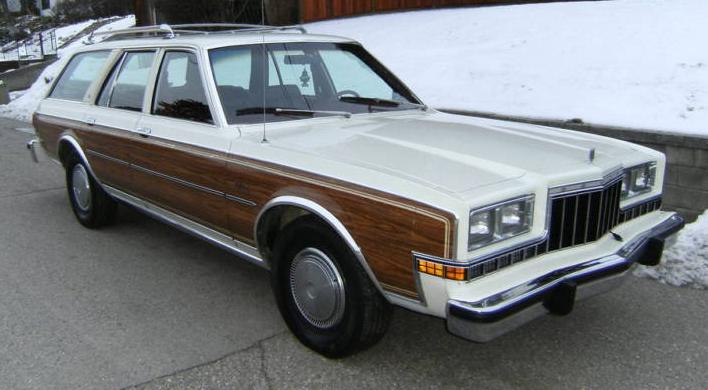
1980 Dodge Diplomat station wagon

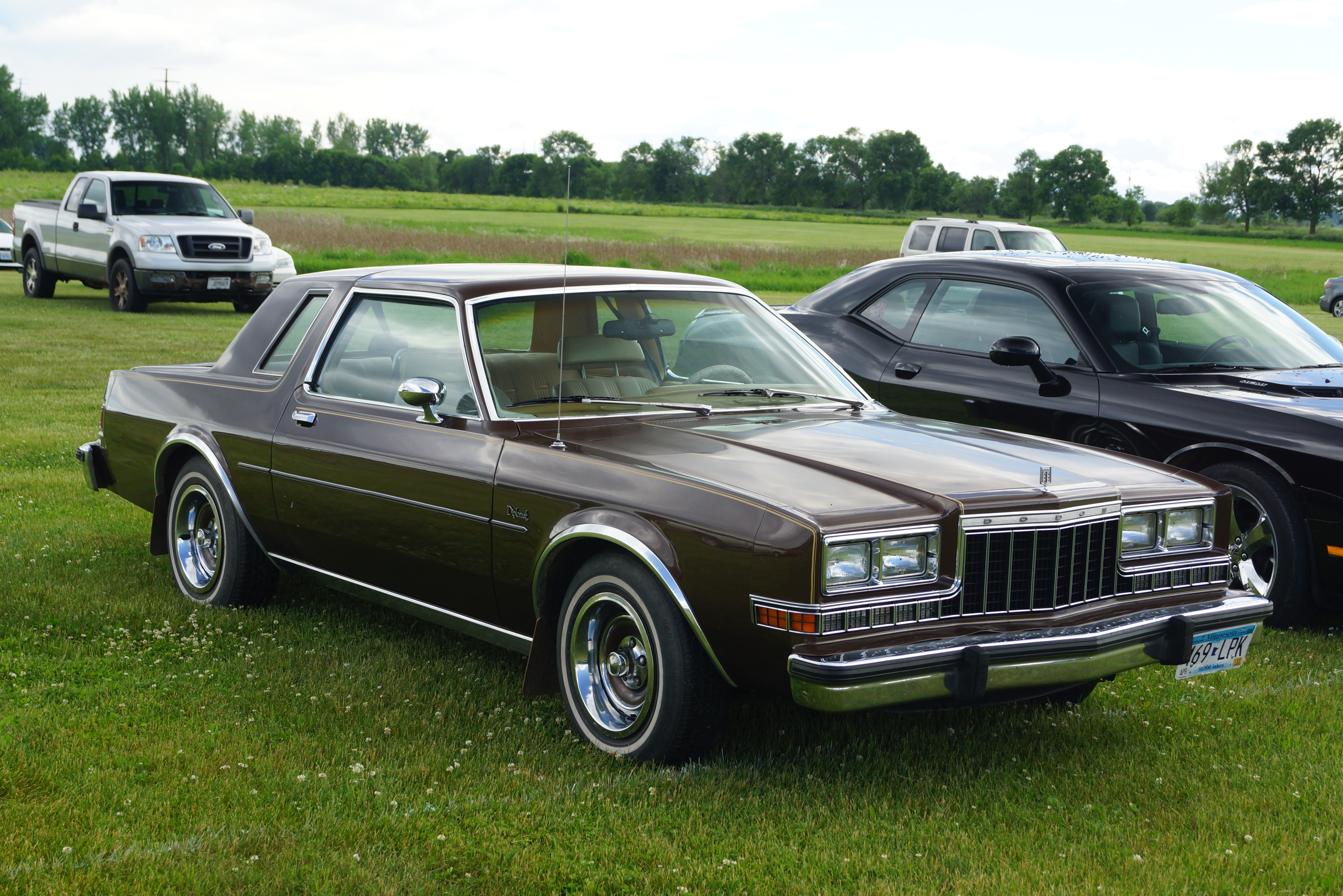
1980 Dodge Diplomat coupe

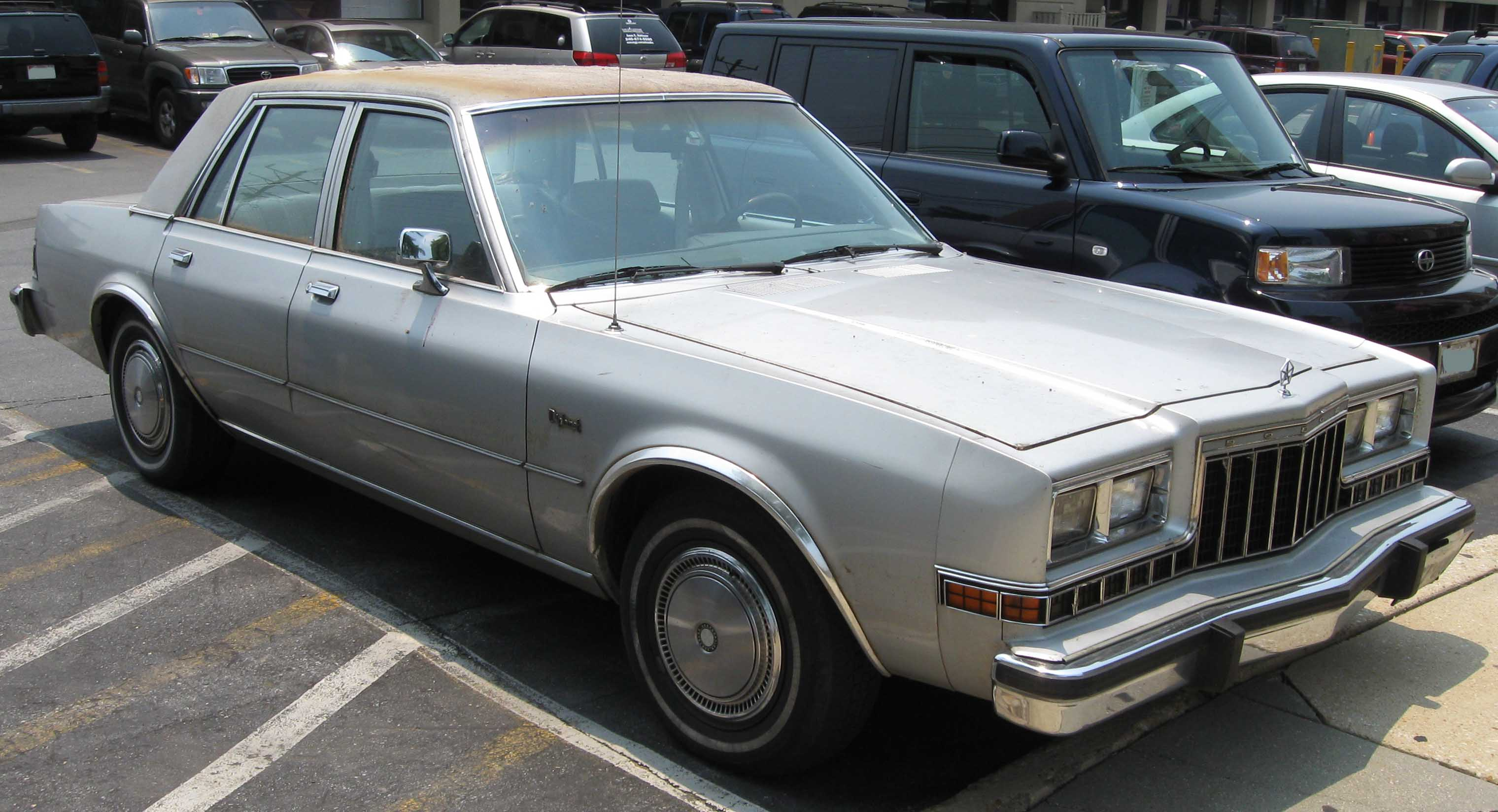
1980–1983 Dodge Diplomat sedan

The 1980 model year brought new exterior sheet metal for the Diplomat, although wagons were unchanged from the doors back. While the previous coupes used the same 112.7 inch wheelbase as the other models, the 1980 coupe used the 108 inch wheelbase of the Aspen coupe (though the square body was very different) to better differentiate it from the new Mirada which used the 112.7 inch span. The front end was more evolutionary than revolutionary, but in order to share a hood with the newly restyled Chrysler LeBaron the grille was narrowed considerably. The roofline of the sedan was also made more square, marginally improving headroom, and conservative, Buick-like taillights appeared on all but the wagons. Manual transmissions were dropped. Following the discontinuing of the Dodge St. Regis R-body in 1981, the Diplomat became the largest sedan in the Dodge lineup, despite technically being a mid-size car. Dodge would not market another truly full-size car (at least based upon United States Environmental Protection Agency (EPA) passenger volume statistics) until the Monaco debuted as a 1990 model.

By 1981, Chrysler was switching to smaller front-wheel drive designs. However, its older and larger rear-wheel drive Dodge Diplomat (as well as the Chrysler LeBaron and Fifth Avenue) continued to sell. Chrysler's then executive vice president for manufacturing, Steve Sharf, met with officials at American Motors (AMC) to use the extra capacity at an assembly plant in Kenosha, Wisconsin to build the cars. Chrysler's tooling was moved from St. Louis to Kenosha, and from 1987 until 1989 about 250,000 Chrysler and Dodge models were built by AMC at a lower cost than Chrysler could. This relationship evolved into Chrysler's purchase of AMC in 1987.

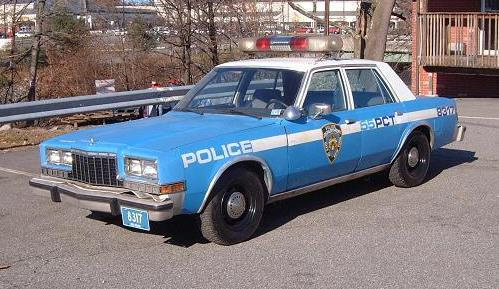
Dodge Diplomat sedan police car formerly used by the New York City Police Department

In 1982, the coupe and station wagon were discontinued and Canada's Plymouth version of the Diplomat came south of the border. The Plymouth Caravelle was offered in the United States as the Plymouth Gran Fury. 1983 was the last year for the Slant Six, and afterwards, the only available engine was the 318-cid V8 with a two-barrel carburetor. A four-barrel 318 remained the optional engine choice for the police package. For 1984, the appearance of the upscale Special Edition or SE used the Fifth Avenue's front end with its parking lights located above the headlights, and a bright metal cross overlaid on the Chrysler grille's thin vertical bars. The SE had more exterior trim and an interior that placed the SE between the Diplomat Salon and the Chrysler Fifth Avenue.

As the 1980s progressed, fewer private customers purchased the Diplomat, and the M-body was eventually dropped during the 1989 model year. Sales of cars equipped with the Police Package represented about half of the Diplomat production after the discontinuation of the coupe and station wagons. Late in the Diplomat's run, the car was subject to the federal "Gas Guzzler Tax" and it also required premium unleaded gasoline. Although sales remained strong, Chrysler CEO Lee Iacocca held a low opinion of the M-body line as a relic of the pre-K car era and declined to invest any money in them. Despite lower gas prices in the mid- to late-1980s and a 2.26:1 rear-end gear ratio, the Diplomat's carbureted engine and lack of an overdrive gear on its TorqueFlite automatic transmission resulted in poor fuel economy compared with its larger competitors from Ford and General Motors, as evidenced by comparing the EPA estimates for 1986 models:

- Dodge Diplomat (5.2 L V8, 3-speed automatic): 16 city, 21 highway, 18 combined
- Chevrolet Caprice (5.0 L V8, 4-speed automatic with overdrive): 17 city, 25 highway, 20 combined
- Ford LTD Crown Victoria (5.0 L V8, 4-speed automatic with overdrive): 18 city, 26 highway, 21 combined

However, Diplomats built from mid-1988 until the end of production were among the first Chrysler-built products to have a driver's side airbag as standard equipment, some two model years before the remainder of Chrysler's lineup and they were also among the only cars at the time to offer a tilt steering column with an airbag. Diplomats with airbags differed from earlier models in that they were also equipped with a padded, color-keyed knee blocker which extended out from beneath the instrument panel in front of the driver.

Production Figures:

(For 1979 and 1981, coupe and sedan figures were not listed separately)

Dodge Diplomat Production Figures
	Sedan	Coupe	Wagon	Yearly Total
1977	12,723	21,490	-	34,213
1978	25,459	24,935	10,906	61,300
1979	43,900		7,785	51,685
1980	12,008	14,691	3,673	30,372
1981	21,158		3,012	24,170
1982	23,146	-	-	23,146
1983	24,444	-	-	24,444
1984	22,163	-	-	22,163
1985	39,165	-	-	39,165
1986	26,953	-	-	26,953
1987	20,627	-	-	20,627
1988	19,173	-	-	19,173
1989	5,709	-	-	5,709
Total	*	*	25,376	383,120

== Discontinuation ==
When the Diplomat and similar Plymouth Gran Fury were discontinued, it marked the last rear-wheel drive sedan sold by the corporation until the Dodge Magnum and Chrysler 300 were introduced in 2005. The Diplomat's other rear-wheel drive sibling, the Chrysler Fifth Avenue, also ended production, but the nameplate was continued on a front-wheel drive chassis. In the Dodge lineup, the Monaco became the top-of-the-line sedan until the introduction of the LH platform.

== See also ==
- DeSoto Diplomat
