= Dodge 600 =

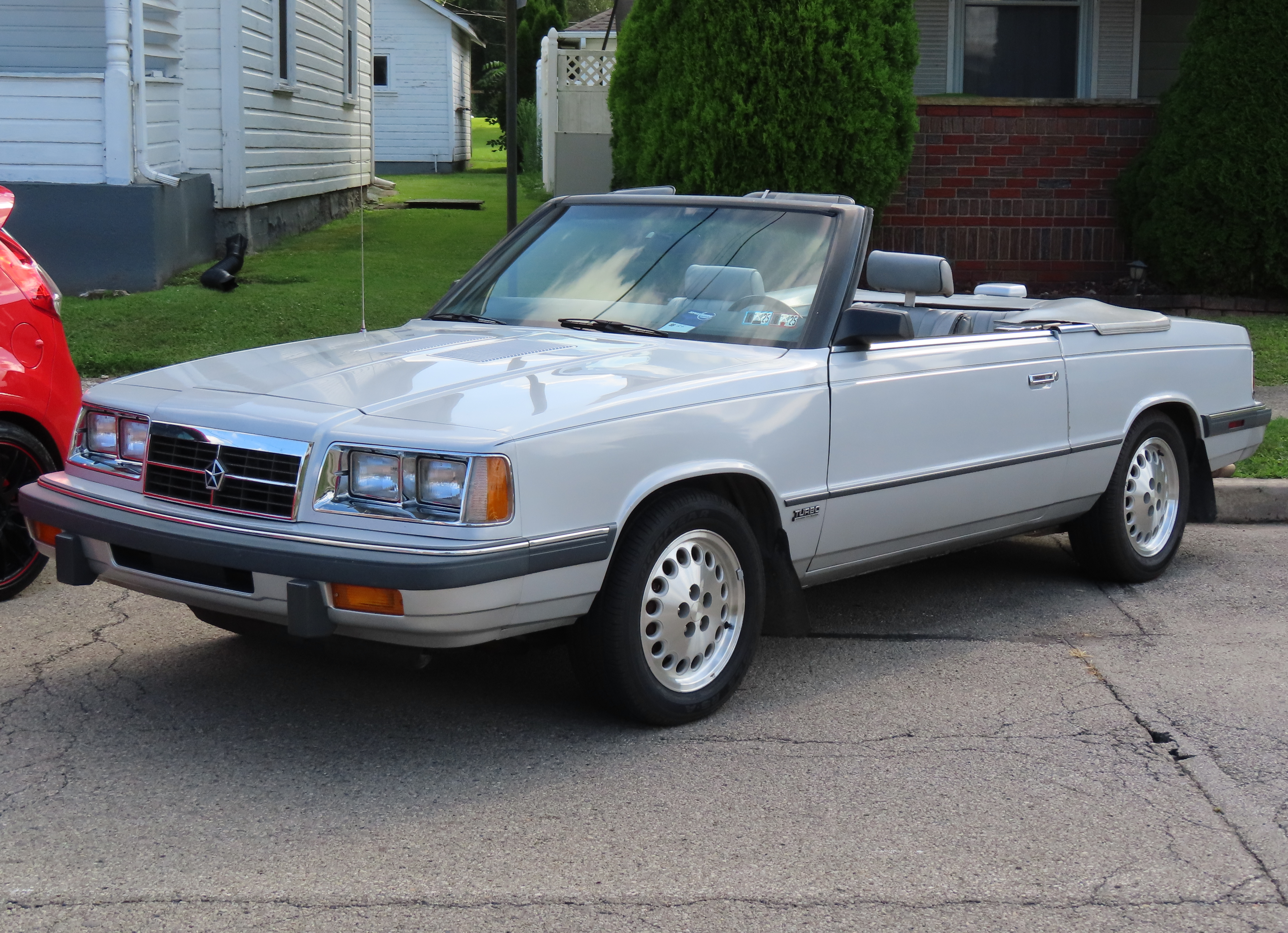
- 1986 Dodge 600 ES Turbo convertible

Overview
- Manufacturer: Dodge (Chrysler)
- Also called: Chrysler Dart Europa; Dodge Dart E (Mexico); Volare E By Chrysler
- Production: 1982–1988
- Model years: 1983–1988
- Assembly: United States: Detroit, Michigan (Jefferson Avenue Assembly); United States: Fenton, Missouri (Saint Louis Assembly: 2-door coupe and convertible)

Body and chassis
- Class: Mid-size
- Body style: 4-door sedan (1983–1988); 2-door coupe (1984–1986); 2-door convertible (1984–1986)
- Layout: FF layout
- Platform: E-body (sedan); K-body (convertible and coupe)
- Related: Chrysler E-Class; Chrysler New Yorker; Plymouth Caravelle

Powertrain
- Engine: 2.2 L K I4; 2.2 L Turbo I I4; 2.5 L K I4; 2.6 L Mitsubishi G54B I4
- Transmission: 5-speed A520 manual 5-speed A525 manual 3-speed A413 automatic 3-speed A470 automatic

Dimensions
- Wheelbase: 100.3 in (2,548 mm) (coupe/convertible, 1984–1986); 103.3 in (2,624 mm) (sedan)
- Length: 185.2 in (4,704 mm)
- Width: 68.0 in (1,727 mm)
- Height: 53.1 in (1,349 mm)

Chronology
- Predecessor: Dodge 400
- Successor: Dodge Spirit (Canada); Dodge Dynasty (United States)

The Dodge 600 is a mid-size car that was sold by Dodge from the 1983 to 1988 model year. Serving as the replacement of the Dodge 400 coupe and convertible, the 600 also included a four-door sedan. Within the Dodge car line, the 600 was slotted between the Dodge Aries (later, the Dodge Lancer) and the Dodge Diplomat.

The 600 coupe/convertible used the Chrysler K platform, shared with the Chrysler LeBaron; the four-door used the Chrysler E platform, an extended-wheelbase variant of the K platform. The 600 was a counterpart of the Plymouth Caravelle, the Chrysler E-Class, and the 1983–1988 Chrysler New Yorker.

Chrysler assembled the 600 four-door at Jefferson Avenue Assembly (Detroit, Michigan) and the two-door/convertible at Saint Louis Assembly (Fenton, Missouri). For 1989, the 600 was replaced by the Dodge Dynasty in the United States; in Canada (where the Dynasty were badged as a Chrysler), the 600 was replaced by the Dodge Spirit.

== Debut ==
The 600 was intended to be Dodge's answer to the European sedans of the day. Its numerical name and rear-end styling was designed to evoke thoughts of Mercedes-Benz models, however it fell more in line with North American contemporaries such as the Chevrolet Celebrity, Pontiac 6000 and the Ford Fairmont (the 600 actually resembled the Dodge Mirada more than any European car). It debuted as a four-door sedan, available in two trims: Base and ES ("Euro Sport"). Power was provided by Chrysler's 2.2 L 4-cylinder engine, with the Mitsubishi-built 2.6 L 4-cylinder available as an option.

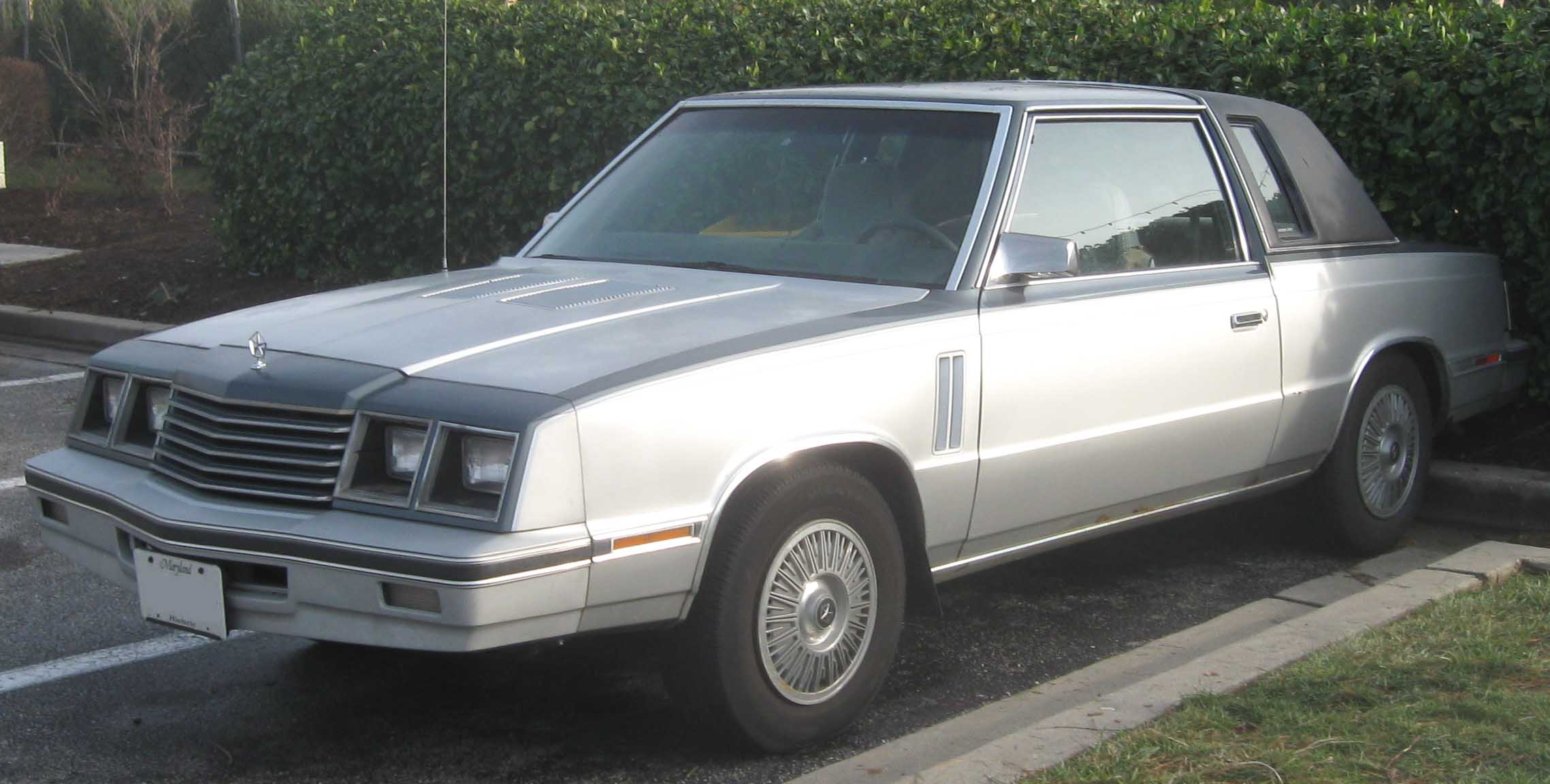
1984–1985 Dodge 600 coupe

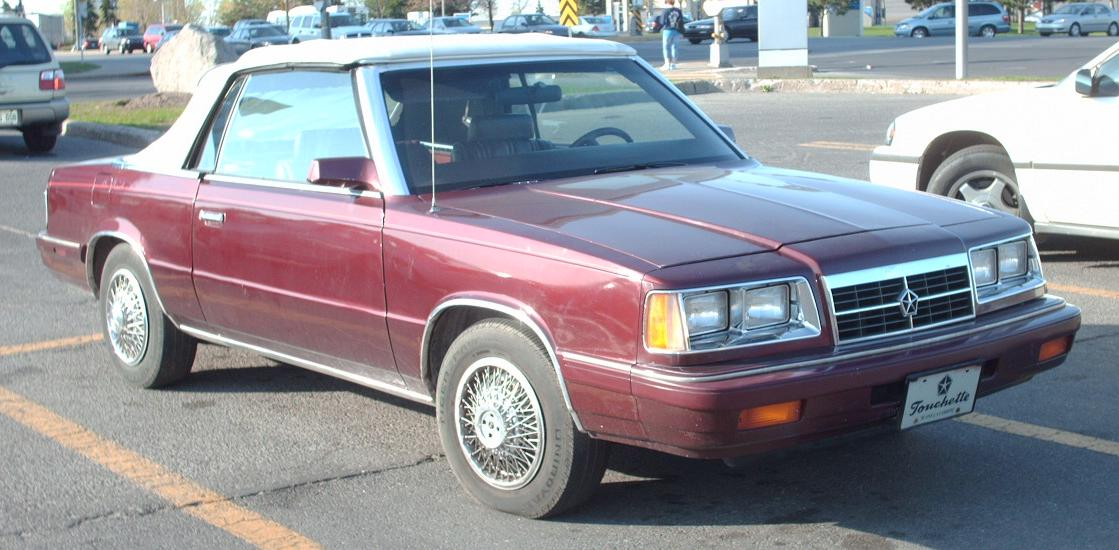
1986 Dodge 600 convertible

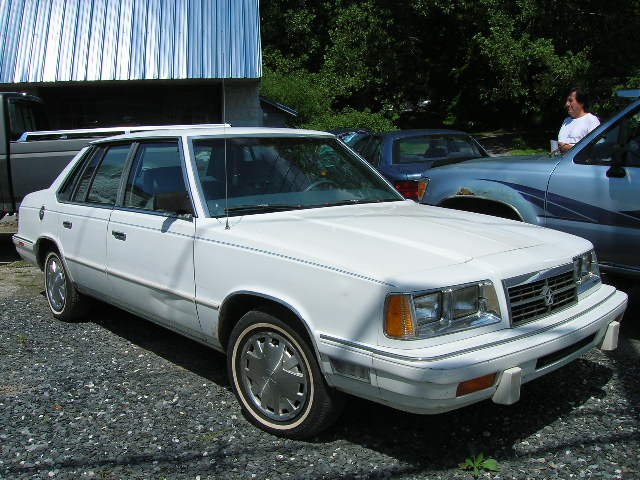
1988 Dodge 600 sedan

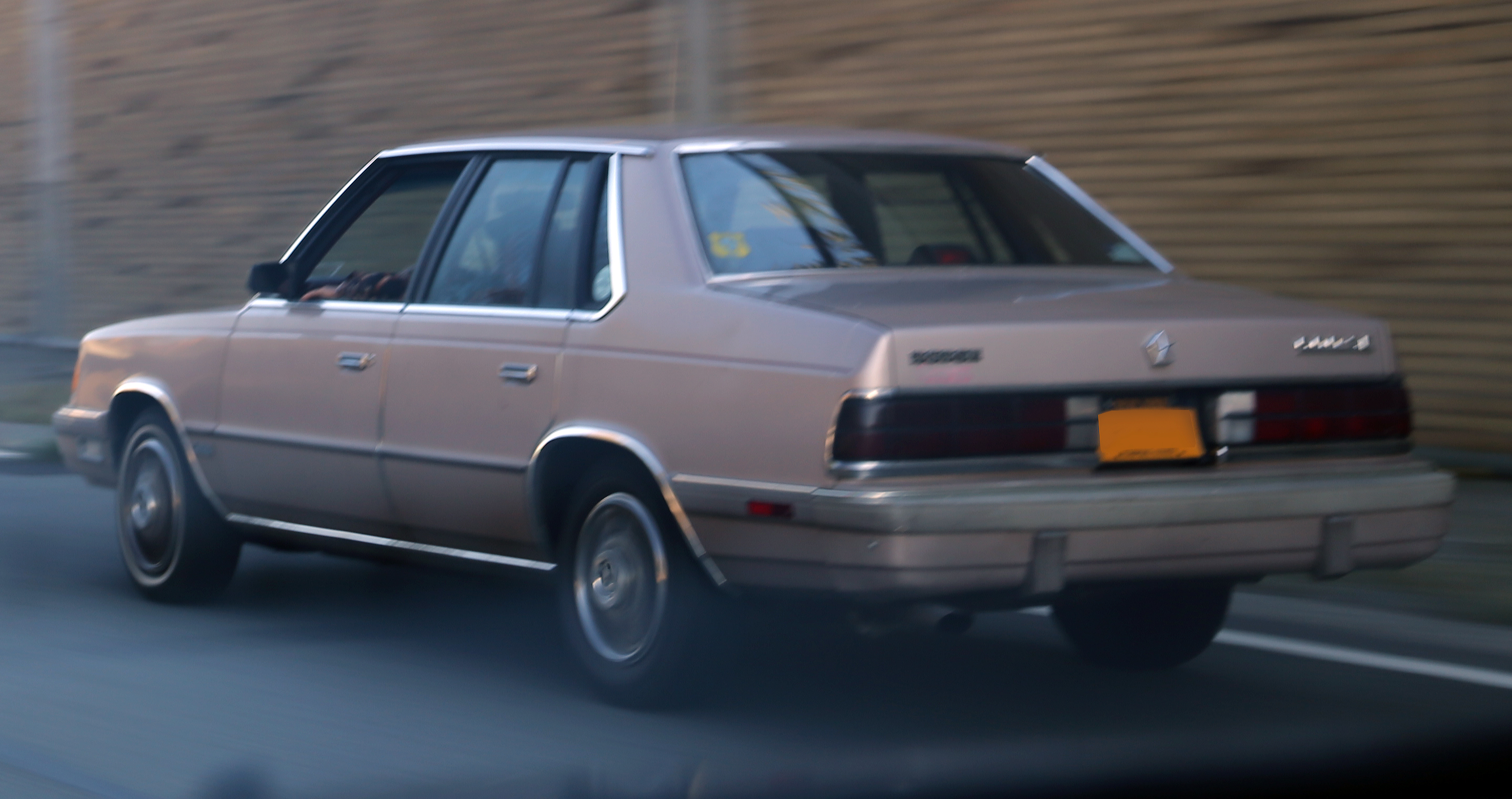
Rear of 1986-1988 600 SE sedan

Sales of the 600 nearly doubled in its second year. This was in large part due to the addition of the former 400's coupe and convertible body styles to the 600's range (which continued to stay on the K platform). Like most midrange-to-upscale K-car derivatives, digital dashboards and the Electronic Voice Alert were options.

== ES Turbo ==
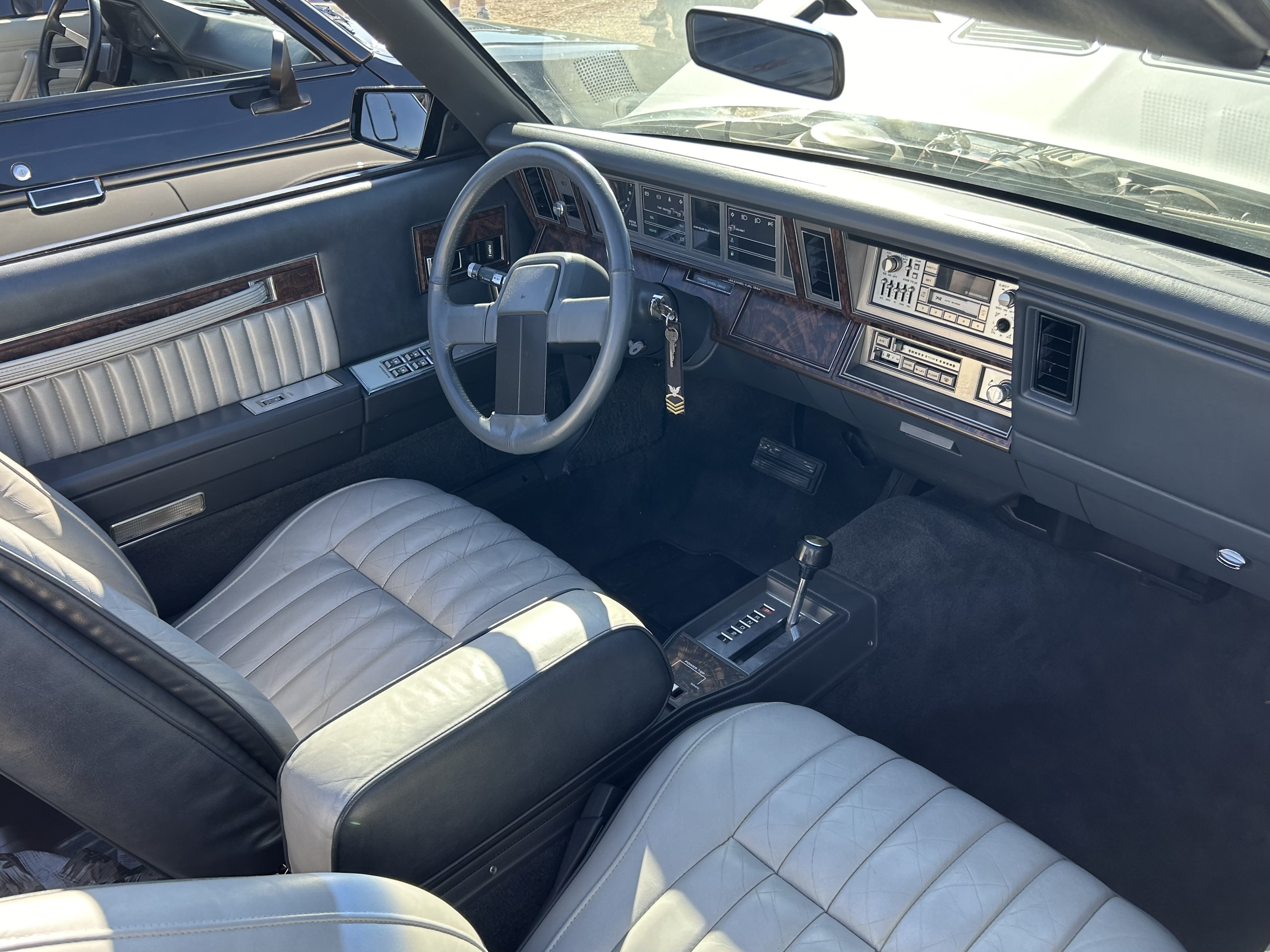
Dodge 600 ES Convertible interior

Midway into 1984 Dodge introduced a sporty new "ES Turbo" package for convertibles. It featured Chrysler's new 2.2 L 142 hp (106 kW) turbocharged engine (which also became an option on sedans and coupes) and a special sport-tuned "ES" suspension. The interior came with standard leather seats, digital dashboard, and four-spoke steering wheel (redesigned in 1985). Visual exterior cues differentiate ES models from base convertibles by way of blacked-out trim (replacing much of the chrome), 15-inch "pizza" style aluminum wheels, "ES" decklid badges, Turbo fender badges, and functioning dual hood vents.

Sales of the ES Turbo were initially slow, with only 1786 copies being sold for the 1984 model year. Output increased to 5621 for 1985, then eased to 4759 for 1986, after which the model was discontinued along with all 600 convertibles. Base price for the 1986 ES Turbo convertible was $14,856.

== Midlife changes ==
Several changes were made to the 600 in 1985. The former base and ES trims were dropped, replaced by a new SE trim. This was due in part to the introduction of the Lancer, which would have competed directly with the 600 (the 5-speed manual transmission was no longer offered as well, in an attempt to keep competition between the Lancer and 600 to a minimum). The coupe and convertible remained relatively unchanged except for minor trim and interior changes. The only significant advancement was the replacement of the 2.2 L engine's two-barrel Holley electronic feedback carburetor by an electronic throttle-body fuel injection system.

The sedan's base trim returned in 1986, while all 600s were given new, restyled front and rear fascias (the front in particular adopted the now familiar "crosshair" grille, dropping the Mirada-inspired horizontal slats). The 2.6 L engine was replaced by a modified 2.5 L version of the Chrysler 2.2 L.

== End of production ==
The phase out of the 600 started in 1987 with the coupe and convertible versions being discontinued in that year. Production of the sedan ended in 1988. The 600 was replaced by the 1988 Dodge Dynasty (badged as a Chrysler in Canada, whereas the Canadian successor is the Dodge Spirit).

There were negotiations to build the car in China after production ended. Hongqi imported a couple of 600s and applied a new rear end and Hongqi badging, intending to sell them as the Hongqi CA750F in China. However, Volkswagen's long-term outlook convinced the Chinese otherwise and Hongqi chose to build the Audi 100 instead, albeit fitted with a locally built version of Chrysler's 2.2-liter inline-four.

== Production ==
Production Figures:

Dodge 600 Production Figures
	Sedan	Coupe	Convertible	Yearly Total
1983	33,488	-	-	33,488
1984	37,381	13,296	10,960	61,637
1985	32,386	12,670	13,809	58,865
1986	31,526	11,714	16,437	59,677
1987	40,391	-	-	40,391
1988	55,550	-	-	55,550
Total	230,722	37,680	41,206	309,608
