= Plymouth Caravelle =

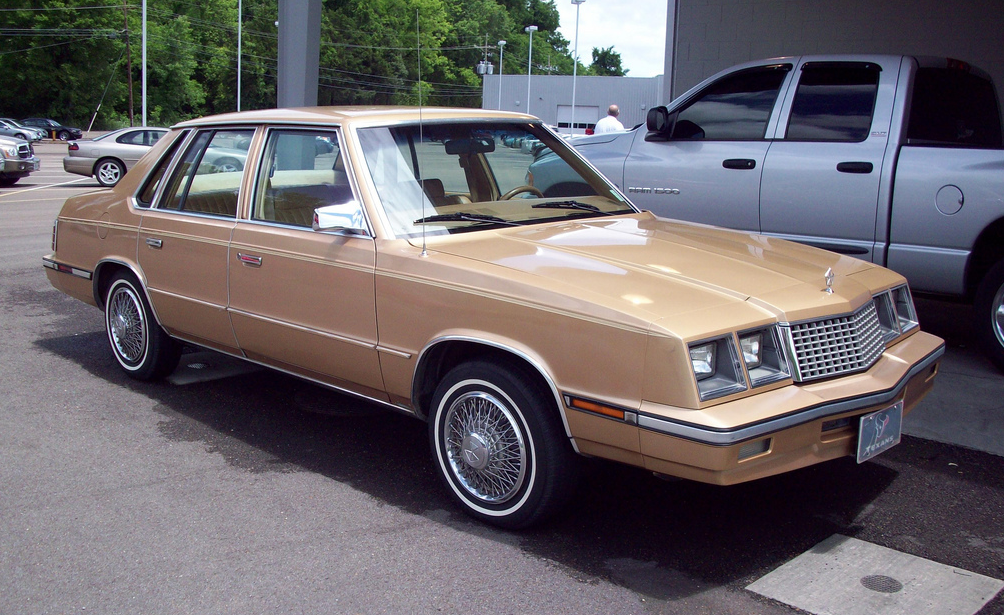

Overview
- Manufacturer: Plymouth (Chrysler)
- Production: 1983–1988
- Model years: 1983–1988 (Canada); 1985–1988 (U.S.)
- Assembly: United States: Detroit, Michigan (Jefferson Avenue Assembly)

Body and chassis
- Class: Mid-size
- Body style: 4-door sedan 2-door coupe
- Layout: Transverse front-engine, front-wheel drive
- Platform: E-body (Sedan); K-body (Coupe)
- Related: Chrysler E-Class; Chrysler New Yorker; Dodge 600

Powertrain
- Engine: 2.2 L K I4; 2.2 L Turbo I I4; 2.5 L K I4; 2.6 L Mitsubishi G54B I4
- Transmission: 5-speed A520 manual 5-speed A525 manual 3-speed A413 automatic 3-speed A470 automatic

Dimensions
- Wheelbase: 103.3 in (2,624 mm)
- Length: 185.2 in (4,704 mm)
- Width: 68.0 in (1,727 mm)
- Height: 53.1 in (1,349 mm)
- Curb weight: 2,598 lb (1,178 kg)

Chronology
- Predecessor: Chrysler E-Class
- Successor: Plymouth Acclaim

The Plymouth Caravelle is a mid-size sedan that was introduced by Plymouth as a 1983 Canadian model. The Caravelle came to the United States in 1985 to replace the Chrysler E-Class. It was essentially identical to the concurrent Dodge 600. It was replaced by the Plymouth Acclaim in 1989. The Caravelle was Plymouth's first front wheel drive mid-size sedan.

The name of the vehicle was inspired by the word Caravel, a 15th-century sailing ship used by the Portuguese; the ship was noted for its speed and agility.

== First generation (M platform; 1978-1989) ==
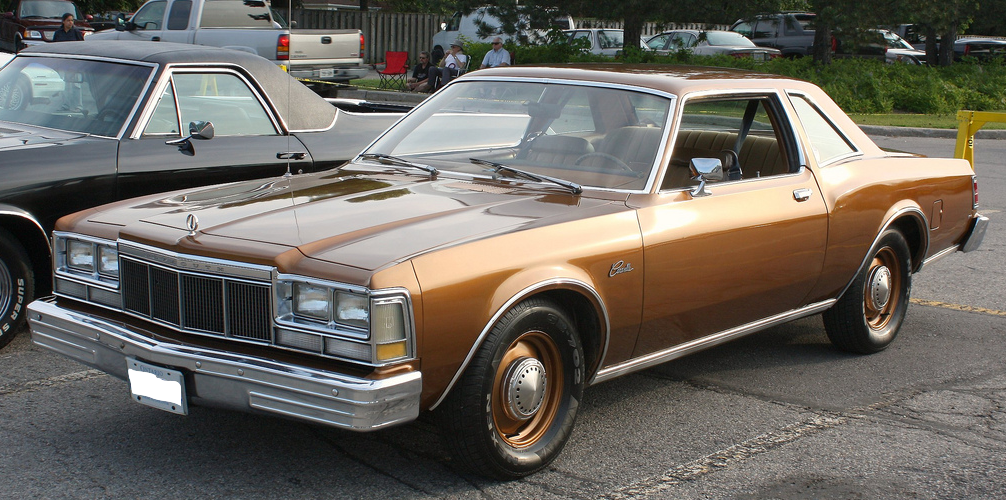
1978 Plymouth Caravelle (Canada)

In Canada, the Plymouth Caravelle first appeared for the 1978 model year as its version of the Dodge Diplomat for Canadian Chrysler-Plymouth dealers. As all Chrysler Canada dealers sold Chryslers, only the top-of-the-line LeBaron was sold in Canada, with the Diplomat and Caravelle not offering as wide a range of trims as US dealer networks; the most expensive Caravelle was approximately $670 cheaper than the most affordable LeBaron.

Between 1978 and mid-1981, Chrysler Canada sourced production of the model line from Saint Louis Assembly (Hazelwood, Missouri).

=== 1983 marketing revision ===
For 1983, Chrysler Canada revised its usage of the Plymouth Caravelle nameplate, extending it across three separate model lines. A two-door front-wheel coupe was derived from the Dodge 400 (itself, from the Dodge Aries), with a longer-wheelbase four-door sedan was derived from the Dodge 600 (this was the car later sold in the United States). In place of adopting the Gran Fury nameplate in Canada, the existing Caravelle was pared down to the up-level Salon trim.

As with their Dodge and Chrysler counterparts, the K-platform Caravelle coupe was discontinued after 1986, with the E-platform Caravelle sedan ending after 1988. The Caravelle Salon was produced the longest, ending production after 1989; both it and the Gran Fury were replaced by the Plymouth Acclaim.

== Second generation (E platform; 1985-1988) ==
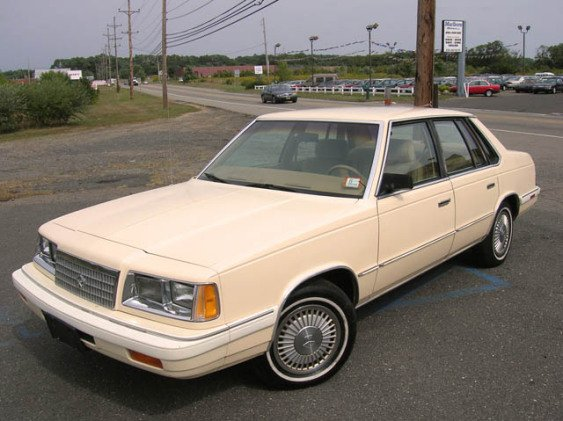
1988 Plymouth Caravelle SE

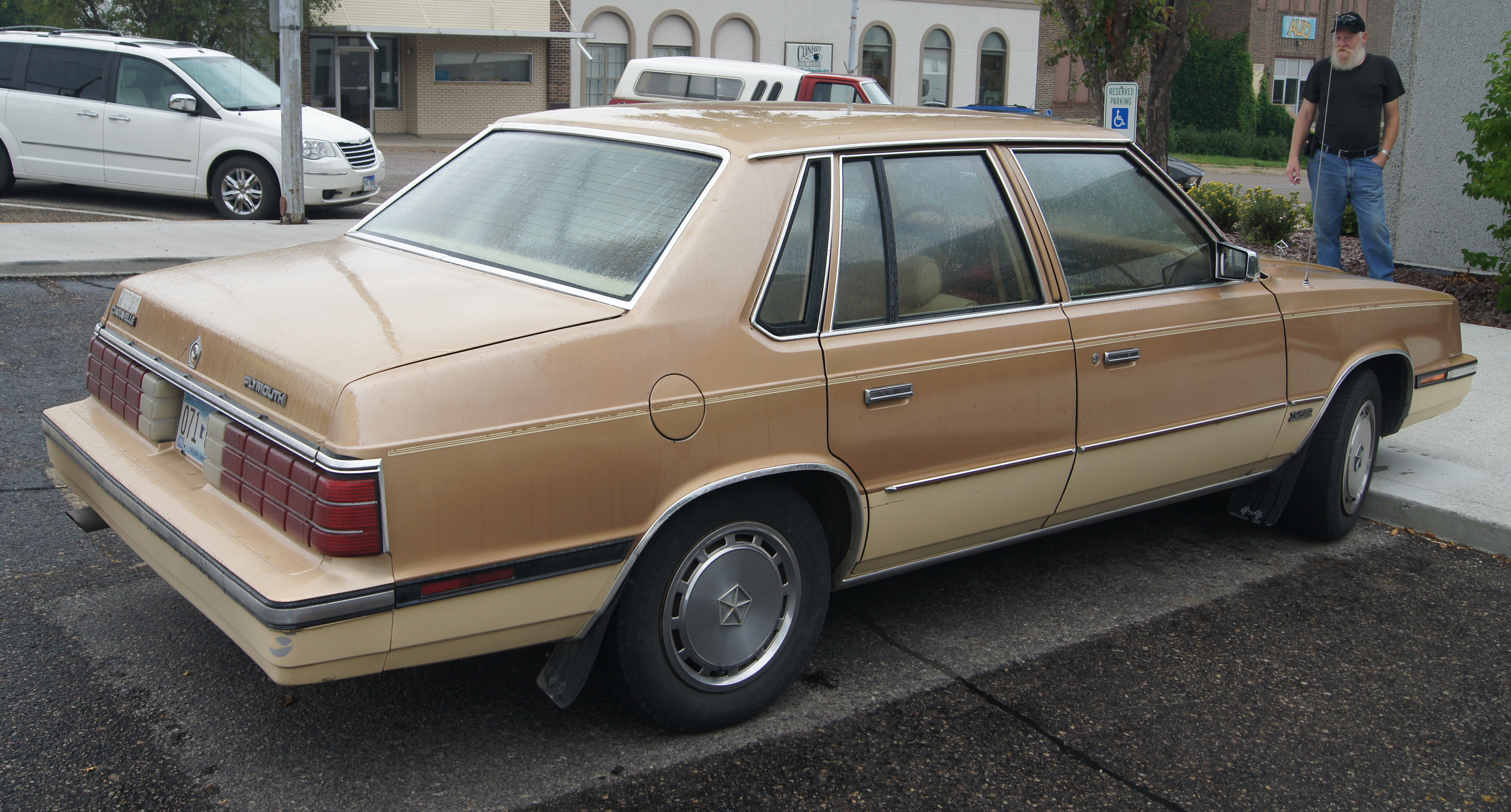
1985 Plymouth Caravelle rear

For 1985, the Chrysler brand dropped its unsuccessful entry-level variant of the E platform, the Chrysler E-Class (the idea of a more mainstream Chrysler was not well received by consumers). Even though the Dodge 600 was mainstream, Dodges were not generally sold with Chryslers, so rather than only having the upscale New Yorker on Chrysler-Plymouth dealer lots, the former E-Class was given a new grille and rebranded as a Plymouth and thus the U.S. Caravelle was created. This model was slotted between the compact Reliant K and the large rear-wheel drive Gran Fury.

For its first year the Caravelle came in one trim level with a number of standard features, the Caravelle SE. These standard features including: AM/FM stereo, power windows, power locks, power adjustable mirrors, deck lid release, cruise control, air conditioning, and a 50/50 split front bench seat, with dual recliners. For 1986, the Caravelle was given a facelift, which rounded many of the sharp angles, giving it a more aerodynamic appearance. Also from 1986 onward, a base model was offered, without some of the standard features of the "SE". The Caravelle continued in the U.S. until 1988, when it was replaced by the new A body Acclaim for 1989. Unlike the identical Canadian Caravelle, a 2-door coupe model was never offered in the U.S.

The Canada-only coupe was dropped after 1986 while sedan production came to an end in 1988. Like the U.S. version, the Canadian Caravelle was replaced by the Plymouth Acclaim for 1989. The Caravelle Salon, which was the original rear wheel drive version, survived until 1989.

=== Engines ===
Engines	Displacement	Power	Torque	Years
2.2	2,213 cm^{3} (135.0 cu in)	97 hp (72 kW) @ 5200	117 lb⋅ft (159 N⋅m) @ 3200	1983–1984
2.2 EFI	2,213 cm^{3} (135.0 cu in)	99 hp (74 kW) @ 5600	121 lb⋅ft (164 N⋅m) @ 3200	1984–1985
2.2 EFI	2,213 cm^{3} (135.0 cu in)	97 hp (72 kW) @ 5200	122 lb⋅ft (165 N⋅m) @ 3200	1986–1987
2.2 EFI	2,213 cm^{3} (135.0 cu in)	93 hp (69 kW) @ 4800	122 lb⋅ft (165 N⋅m) @ 3200	1988
2.2 EFI Turbo	2,213 cm^{3} (135.0 cu in)	142 hp (106 kW) @ 5600	160 lb⋅ft (220 N⋅m) @ 3200	1984
2.2 EFI Turbo	2,213 cm^{3} (135.0 cu in)	146 hp (109 kW) @ 5200	168 lb⋅ft (228 N⋅m) @ 3600	1985–1988
2.5 EFI	2,501 cm^{3} (152.6 cu in)	101 hp (75 kW) @ 4800	136 lb⋅ft (184 N⋅m) @ 2800	1986–1987
2.5 EFI	2,501 cm^{3} (152.6 cu in)	96 hp (72 kW) @ 4400	133 lb⋅ft (180 N⋅m) @ 2800	1988
2.6	2,555 cm^{3} (155.9 cu in)	95 hp (71 kW) @ 4800	138 lb⋅ft (187 N⋅m) @ 2400	1983
2.6	2,555 cm^{3} (155.9 cu in)	105 hp (78 kW) @ 4800	142 lb⋅ft (193 N⋅m) @ 2800	1984–1985
2.6	2,555 cm^{3} (155.9 cu in)	101 hp (75 kW) @ 4800	140 lb⋅ft (190 N⋅m) @ 2800	1985

=== Trim levels ===
Trim levels for U.S. version, 1985–1988

- SE: 1985–1988
- base: 1986–1988

Production figures for U.S. version:

Year	Units
1985	39,971
1986	34,352
1987	42,465
1988	16,889

Figures obtained from Encyclopedia of American Cars
