= Chrysler E-Class =

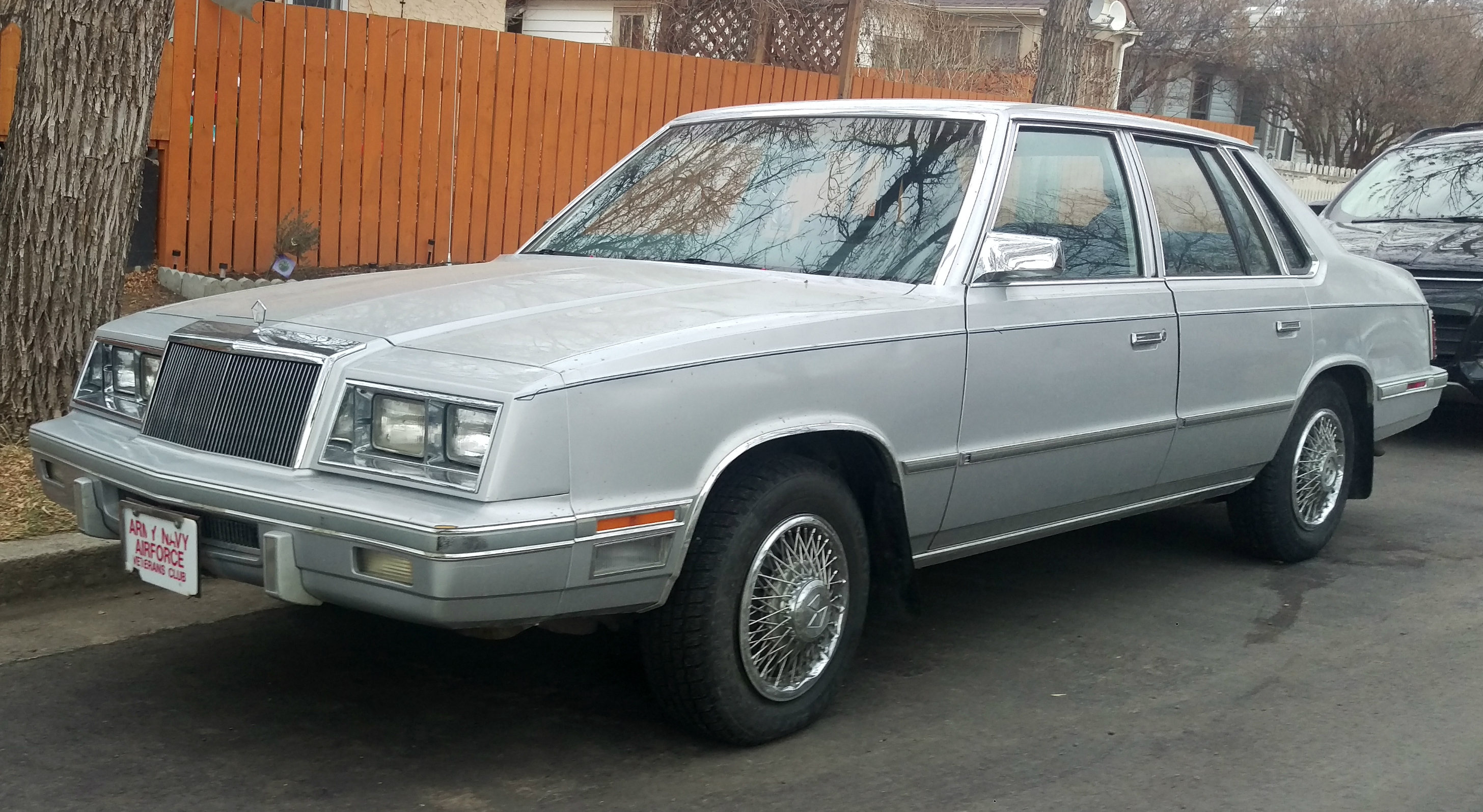

Overview
- Manufacturer: Chrysler Corporation
- Production: 1982–1984
- Model years: 1983–1984
- Assembly: United States: Jefferson Avenue Assembly, Detroit, Michigan

Body and chassis
- Class: Mid-size
- Body style: 4-door sedan
- Layout: FF layout
- Platform: E-body
- Related: Chrysler New Yorker; Dodge 600; Plymouth Caravelle

Powertrain
- Engine: 2.2 L K I4; 2.2 L Turbo I I4; 2.6 L Mitsubishi G54B I4
- Transmission: 3-speed A413 automatic 3-speed A470 automatic

Chronology
- Predecessor: Chrysler Newport
- Successor: Plymouth Caravelle

The Chrysler E Class is a mid-size car that was produced by Chrysler from 1983 to 1984. Taking its name from its Chrysler platform designation, the E Class commenced an era of downsized Chrysler vehicles, serving as a companion model for the first front-wheel drive Chrysler New Yorker.

Alongside the twelfth-generation New Yorker, the E Class shared the Chrysler E platform with the Dodge 600 and the Plymouth Caravelle (initially sold by Chrysler Canada).

For its entire production, Chrysler assembled the E Class in its Jefferson Avenue Assembly facility (Detroit, Michigan).

== Model overview ==
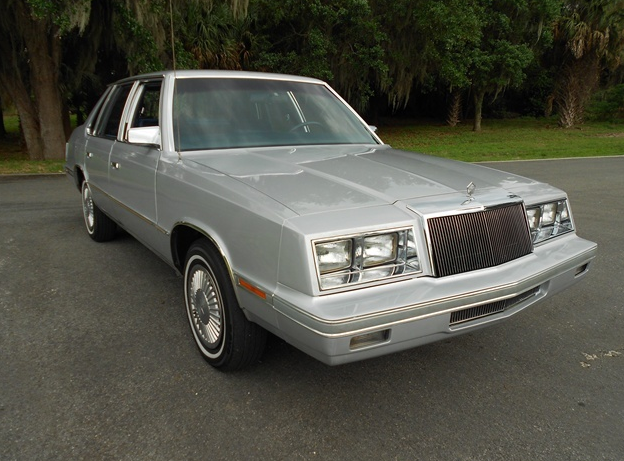
1984 Chrysler E Class

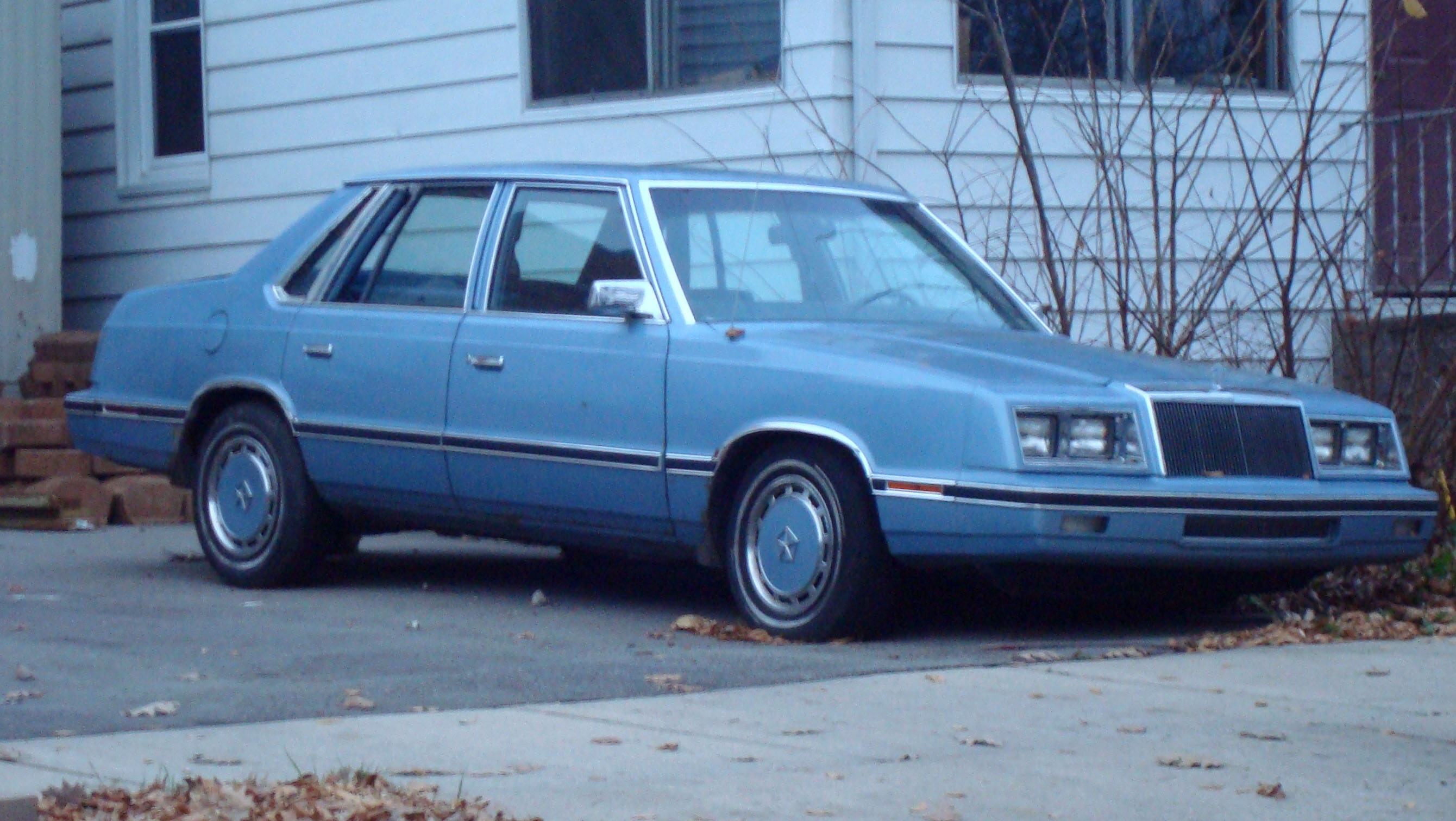
1983 Chrysler E Class

In launching the E Class, Chrysler introduced its first front-wheel drive cars larger than its K-Cars, as its R and M-platform cars were far larger than the mid-size segment. Along with the New Yorker adopting the new chassis, the E Class inherited the role of the long-running Chrysler Newport; sharing its body with the New Yorker, the model line was slotted between the K-car LeBaron and the M-body Fifth Avenue in size.

While Ford would not produce a mid-size sedan with front-wheel drive until the 1986 Taurus/Sable, Chrysler targeted the E Class against the Buick Century and Oldsmobile Cutlass Ciera (among the best-selling model lines for each brand). Originally intended to be named the "Chrysler Grand LeBaron", the E Class name (styled without the hyphen, in contrast to Mercedes-Benz) was selected instead, in deference to its E platform.

=== Chassis ===
The Chrysler E Class utilizes the Chrysler E platform (E=extended), which increases the K platform wheelbase 2.8 inches (from 100.3 to 103.1 inches). Carrying over the majority of its chassis design from the K platform, the E Class is fitted with a MacPherson front strut suspension and rear trailing arms with a coil-sprung rear beam axle. Along with cast-alloy wheels, an upgraded sport suspension was available as a stand-alone option.

The standard engine was a 2.2 L I4 (producing 94 hp) and a Mitsubishi-sourced 2.6 L I4 (producing 92 hp, with increased torque); a 3-speed automatic transmission was paired to both engines. For 1984, the engine lineup was revised, with the 2.2 L engine replacing its carburetor with electronic fuel injection (increasing output to 99 hp); the 2.6 L I4 was retuned (producing 100 hp). As a new option, a turbocharged version of the 2.2L engine was released (producing 140 hp).

=== Body ===
Alongside its extended wheelbase, the E Class grew approximately 6 inches in length over the LeBaron (though far shorter than the Fifth Avenue). Sharing its roofline with the Dodge 600 and Plymouth Caravelle, the E Class was offered solely as a four-door sedan. To distinguish itself from its Dodge/Plymouth counterparts, the E-Class shared its front and rear fascias with the Chrysler LeBaron; the New Yorker was fitted with a padded vinyl roof (covering its C-pillar windows). For 1984, the exterior underwent a minor update, with the flat taillamps replaced by a wraparound design (shared with the LeBaron).

The interior of the E Class shared design commonality with the New Yorker (though with different trim). A six-passenger interior was standard with a full-width front bench seat, and a five-passenger configuration came with a 50/50 split bench seat (which added a center console between the seats, including a power driver seat) For 1984, several changes to the interior, distinguished by a redesigned Chrysler 2-spoke steering wheel and the standardization of electronically-tuned radios.

=== Trim ===
For its production, the E Class was sold in a single trim, with options either packaged together or offered individually, allowing the model line to be equipped both quite spartanly or essentially equivalent to a New Yorker.

== Discontinuation ==
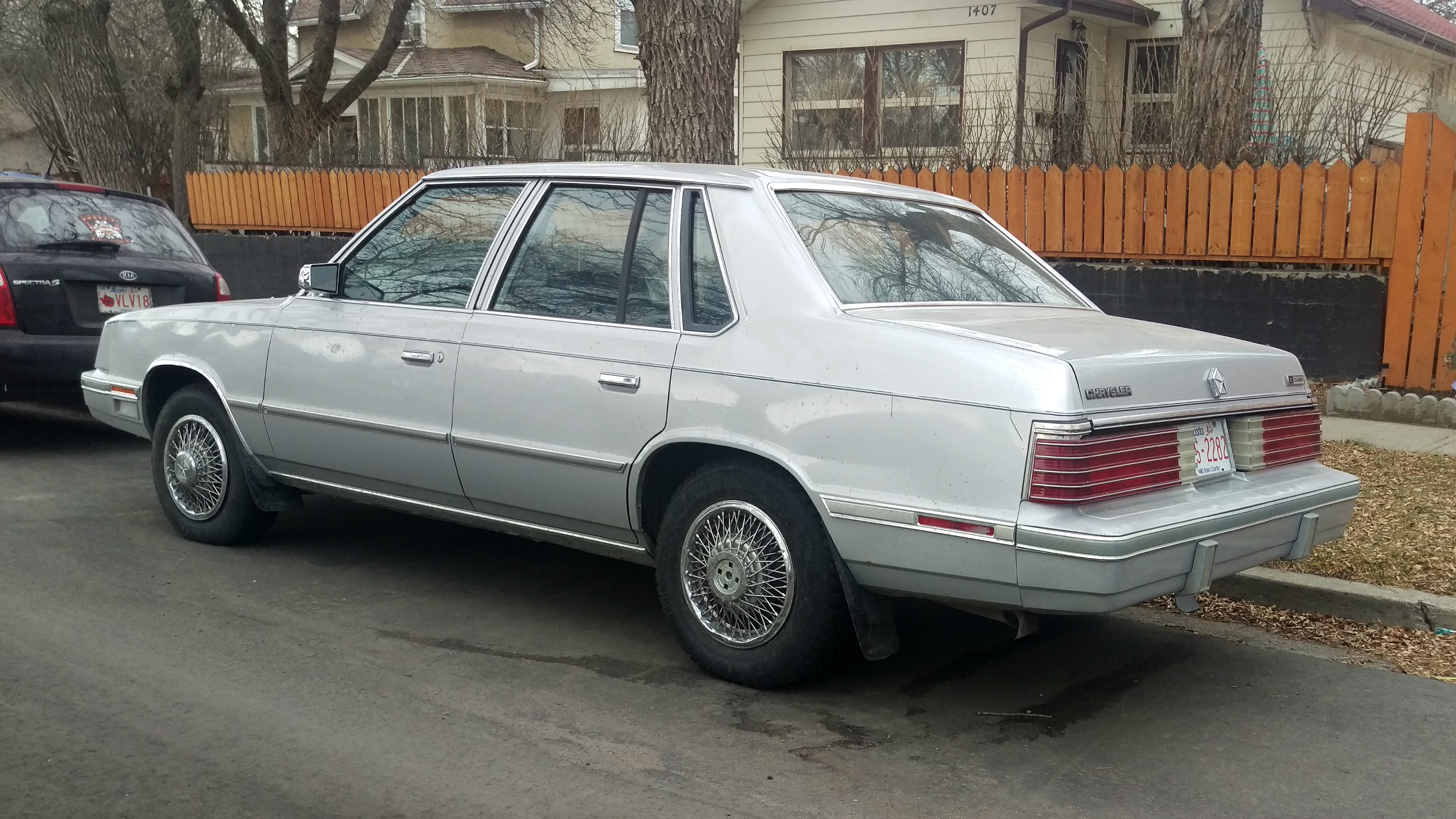
1984 Chrysler E Class rear view

Following slow sales of the model line (outsold nearly two-to-one by the New Yorker for 1984), Chrysler dropped the E Class from its model line for 1985. The same car made its return to Chrysler-Plymouth dealer networks, as Chrysler repackaged it as the Plymouth Caravelle (previously sold only in Canada). The 1985 Caravelle inherited its design from its Canadian namesake, adopting the front fascia of the Dodge 600 (with an eggcrate grille); a 1986 update adopted the front bodywork of the Chrysler LeBaron (with its own grille).

The E platform New Yorker remained in production into the 1988 model year, fitted with a modified version of the front bodywork of the 1983-1984 E Class. After 1988, Chrysler replaced its E platform model lines with the AC platform (alongside the Y platform, the largest sedan variants of the K-car chassis).

== Sales ==
Production
Model Year	Units
1983	39,258
1984	32,237
Total	71,495
