= Dodge Mirada =

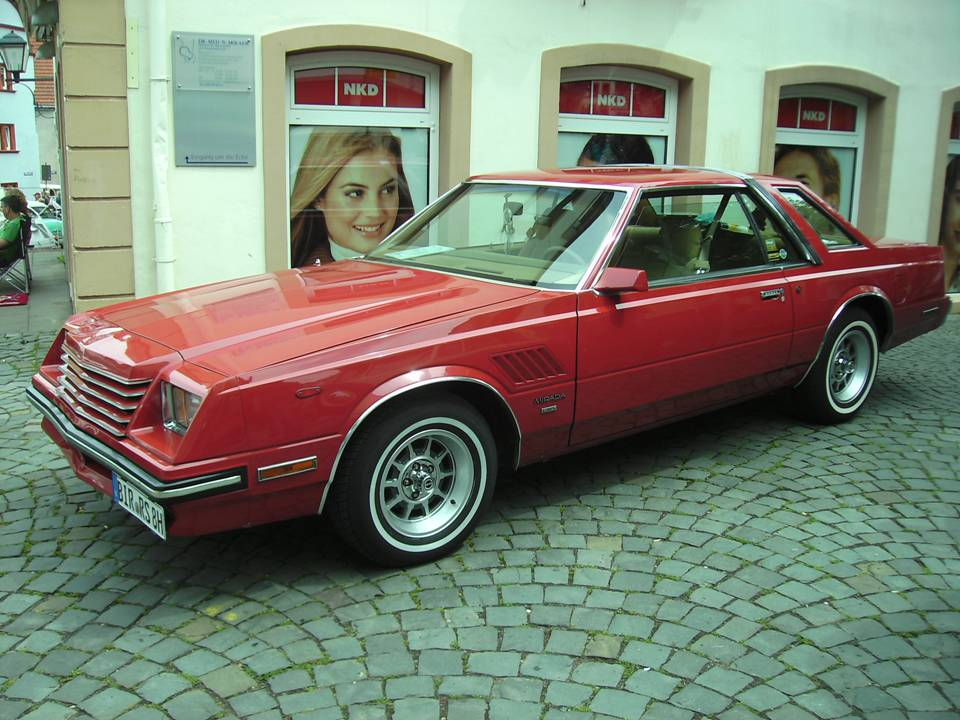
- 1981 Dodge Mirada

Overview
- Manufacturer: Chrysler Corporation
- Model years: 1980–1983; 52,947 produced
- Assembly: Windsor, Ontario, Canada
- Designer: Ernie Barry

Body and chassis
- Class: Mid-size
- Body style: 2-door coupe
- Layout: FR layout
- Platform: J-body
- Related: Dodge Aspen/Plymouth Volaré; Chrysler Cordoba; Imperial

Powertrain
- Engine: 225 cu in (3.7 L) slant 6 I6; 318 cu in (5.2 L) LA V8; 360 cu in (5.9 L) LA V8
- Transmission: 3-speed A904 automatic 3-speed A727 automatic

Dimensions
- Wheelbase: 112.7 in (2,863 mm)
- Length: 209.5 in (5,321 mm)
- Width: 72.7 in (1,847 mm)
- Height: 53.3 in (1,354 mm) (1980); 53.2 in (1,351 mm) (1981–83)
- Curb weight: 3,373 lb (1,530 kg) (1980); 3,380 lb (1,533 kg) (1981–83)

Chronology
- Predecessor: Dodge Magnum
- Successor: Dodge 600 (in 1983)

The Dodge Mirada is a mid-sized, rear-wheel drive coupe manufactured and marketed by Dodge for the model years 1980 to 1983, sharing the Chrysler J platform along with its badge engineered variants, the second generation Chrysler Cordoba and the Imperial. Production of the Mirada reached just under 53,000 units, staying relatively unchanged during its four-year run, with the exception of paint colors and engines. The Mirada was marketed as a sporty personal luxury car with limited advertising and marketing during a period when Chrysler was in deep financial difficulty.

== Design ==
To help Chrysler meet the ever stricter Corporate Average Fuel Economy (CAFE) standards, the Mirada/Cordoba were downsized considerably from their predecessors, with the new models sitting on a modified version of the Dodge Aspen/Plymouth Volaré's platform that shared the sedan and wagon's 112.7 inch wheelbase. The Mirada was designed after the Cordoba's design was locked in, with various changes made to distinguish it and make it more sporting. Chief designer Ernie Barry had to include the landau roof even though the design team would have preferred not to, as such "classic" features were favored by Chrysler Chairman Lee Iacocca. The front end was from flexible plastic, with a grille design inspired by the "coffin-nosed" Cord 810/812.

== Trims and options ==
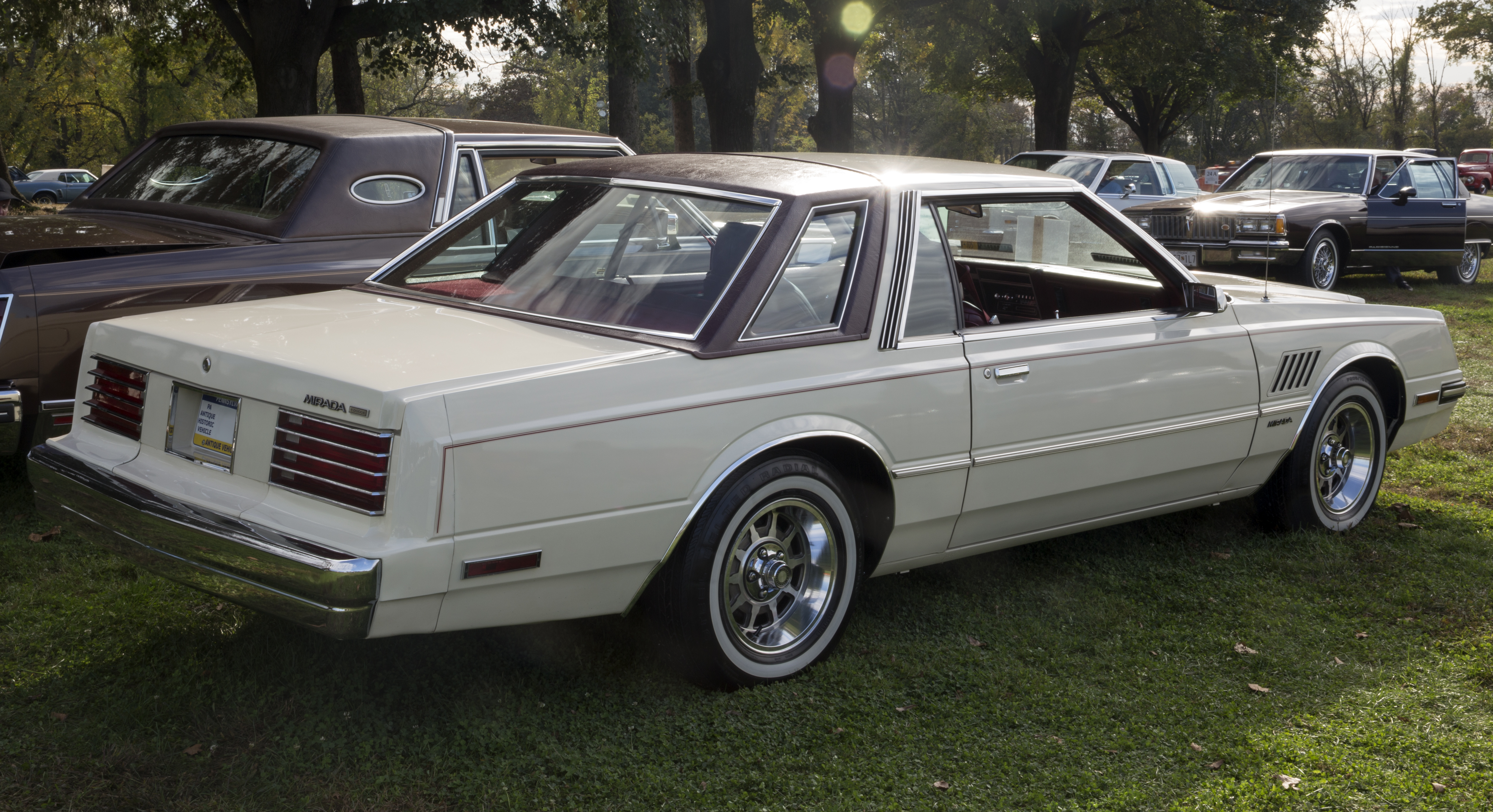
Rear view of a 1980 Mirada with the vinyl landau roof

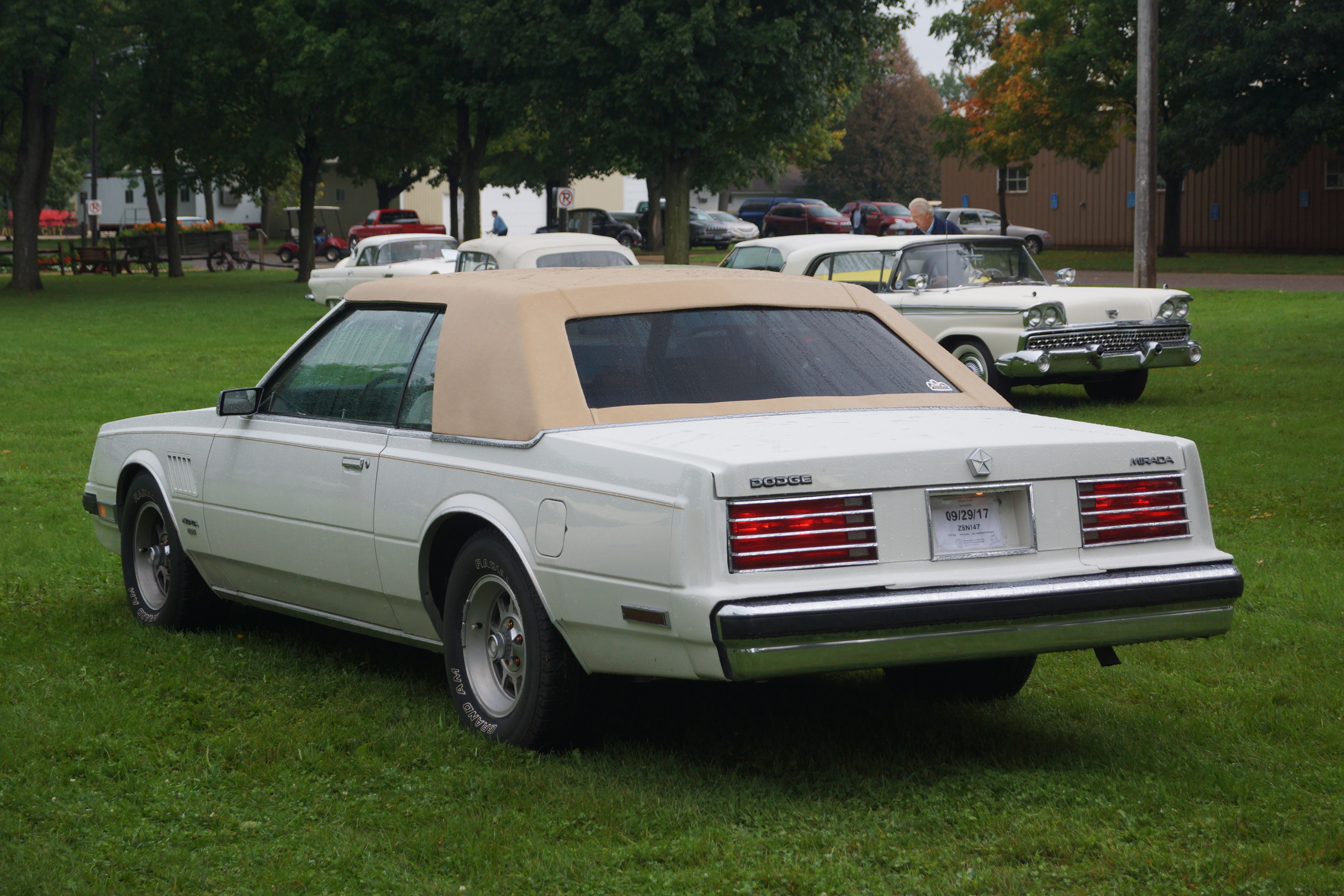
1983 Dodge Mirada CMX with the faux "cabriolet" roof

The base models all received a basic metal roof with a chrome beauty strip extending from the bottom of the opera windows and across the roof. A power sunroof, or a glass T-top roof, were both offered as options for a sportier look; while a vinyl landau roof, or a "cabriolet roof", which was basically a mock convertible top with a blocked out quarter window, were both offered for a more luxurious look. The T-tops and landau were offered every year except for 1983, and the cabriolet top was offered every year. A power sunroof was offered for 1980 and 1981.

Base models came with 15” steel wheels with turbine-like hubcaps, or polished ten-spoke, 15” aluminum wheels with painted sections and bright chrome center caps.

The Mirada was offered in the following trims:

- Base
- S (also referred to as "SE")
- CMX

=== Interior ===
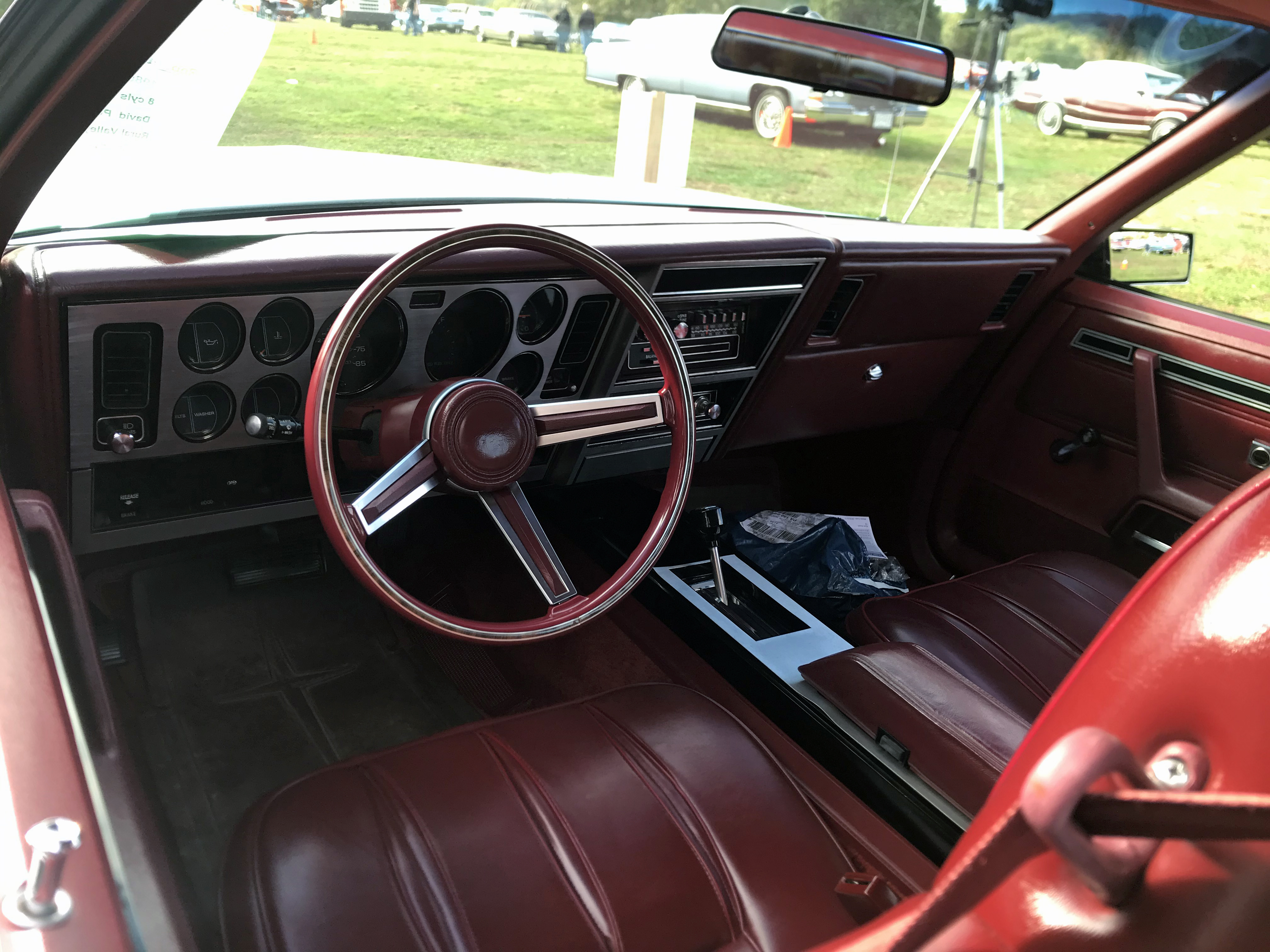
1980 Dodge Mirada interior with the vinyl Sport bucket seats

The Mirada came standard with a brushed aluminum finish on the instrumental panel, with faux woodgrain finish offered as an option. The base seats were cloth Sport bucket seats, while optional seats included vinyl Sport bucket seats, cloth and vinyl 60/40 split bench seats, and leather and vinyl bucket seats. Since the Mirada could be chosen with either a column shift or floor shift, the bench seat was only offered with the column shifter. Buyers had the choice of either an AM/FM stereo or an AM/FM/cassette stereo, an AM/FM/8-track stereo, and a Chrysler CB radio could be chosen as well. Available steering wheels included two iterations of base 2-spoke wheels, an optional 3-spoke Mopar "Tuff Wheel" and an optional 4-spoke sport wheel. Manual windows were standard on the base model, but the power windows from the CMX could be ordered on the base models as well.

Production Figures:

Dodge Mirada Production Figures
| | Yearly Total |
|---|---|
| 1980 | 28,633 |
| 1981 | 11,899 |
| 1982 | 6,818 |
| 1983 | 5,597 |
| Total | 52,947 |

== Powertrain ==
The 3.7 L inline slant-6 engine was available in the base Mirada, with the 5.2 L V8 offered as optional, and the code E58 360 5.9 L V8 available in the Mirada CMX, though only in 1980. For unexplained reasons the 360 was not available in any Chrysler automobiles from 1981 and on. All of these engines were mated to the A904 automatic transmission except the 360 (5.9L), which received the stronger A727. With the 185-horsepower 360, it was one of the fastest American cars available in 1980, on par with the Chevrolet Corvette.

| engine displacement, type, carburetor type | max. motive power at rpm | max. torque at rpm | transmission |
|---|---|---|---|
| 225 cu in (3,687 cc) slant 6 I6; 1-barrel | 90 bhp (67 kW) (1980); 85 bhp (63 kW) (1981–83) at 3,600 | 160 lb⋅ft (217 N⋅m) (1980); 165 lb⋅ft (224 N⋅m) (1981–83) at 1,600 | 3-speed A904 automatic |
| 318 cu in (5,211 cc) LA V8; 2-barrel | 120 bhp (89 kW) (1980); 130 bhp (97 kW) (1981–83) at 3,600 | 245 lb⋅ft (332 N⋅m) (1980); 230 lb⋅ft (312 N⋅m) (1981–83) at 1,600 | 3-speed A904 automatic |
| 360 cu in (5,899 cc) LA V8; 4-barrel | 185 bhp (138 kW) at 4,000 | 275 lb⋅ft (373 N⋅m) at 2,000 | 3-speed A727 automatic |

== Suspension ==
The suspension of the Mirada utilized transverse torsion bars in the front and leaf springs with a sway bar in the rear. A "sport handling package" was offered, which included heavy-duty shock absorbers, torsion bar bushings, springs, as well as anti-sway bars in both the front and rear. The braking system used power assisted disc brakes in the front and drum brakes in the rear.

== NASCAR ==
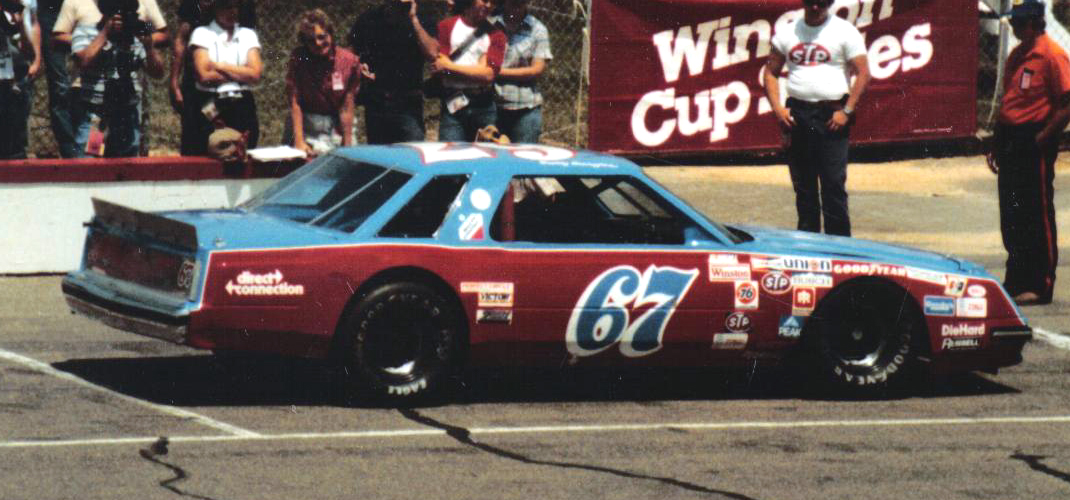
Buddy Arrington driving his No. 67 Dodge Mirada at the 1983 Van Scoy 500

It was hoped that the Mirada would reopen the door to Dodge success in NASCAR racing, as the nameplate had not won a race since November 1977. Lee Iacocca personally called Richard Petty, a longtime Dodge driver, in late October 1980 and asked him to build and test a race spec Mirada, saying Chrysler would supply Petty Enterprises the necessary body sheetmetal and engine parts Petty would need to build and campaign the car. Petty, who had left Dodge for General Motors in 1978, agreed, and had his team immediately set about and built a Mirada-based race-car. A few other teams including Junior Johnson's team built race-spec Miradas to test. Johnson's team would have been a major coup for Dodge, as they had been running GM cars since the early 1970s and the team had just signed Darrell Waltrip away from DiGard Motorsports to drive for them (Waltrip having won 22 races in GM cars prior to this).

After their car was built, the Petty team thought the Mirada looked like a great race car, and some initial testing pleased the longtime Dodge driver. A January 17, 1981, test session at Daytona Speedway where around 15,000 Petty fans showed up to watch. However the Mirada was 8 mph (13 km/h) slower than the GM and Ford cars of the day. This testing of the car, as well as the Junior Johnson team's testing, revealed that while it looked fairly aerodynamic, the bodystyle actually had a very high coefficient of drag that made it incapable of speeds over 185 mph. The Petty team removed the Mirada sheet metal (passing it to Buddy Arrington) and, like the Johnson team, elected to build GM G platform bodied racecars (as shared by the Chevrolet Monte Carlo, Pontiac Grand Prix, Oldsmobile Cutlass Supreme and Buick Regal), and this put an end to Chrysler's attempt to re-establish itself in NASCAR.

However, two small and independent racing teams, Arrington Racing (which was using secondhand rebadged Petty Dodges) and Negre Racing, decided to make a go of the car and campaigned it during the 1981 to 1984 racing seasons. Arrington managed 17 top-ten finishes during those years, though all were on short (1 mile or less) length tracks. A few other drivers (Dave Marcis in four races, and Dick May in three) ran Miradas occasionally in 1981, but the cars were either plagued with mechanical issues, or finished several laps off the leaders. Up until the end of 1984, Miradas raced from time to time, but without much success, and ultimately led to Dodge disappearing from NASCAR until 2001.
