= Chrysler Newport =

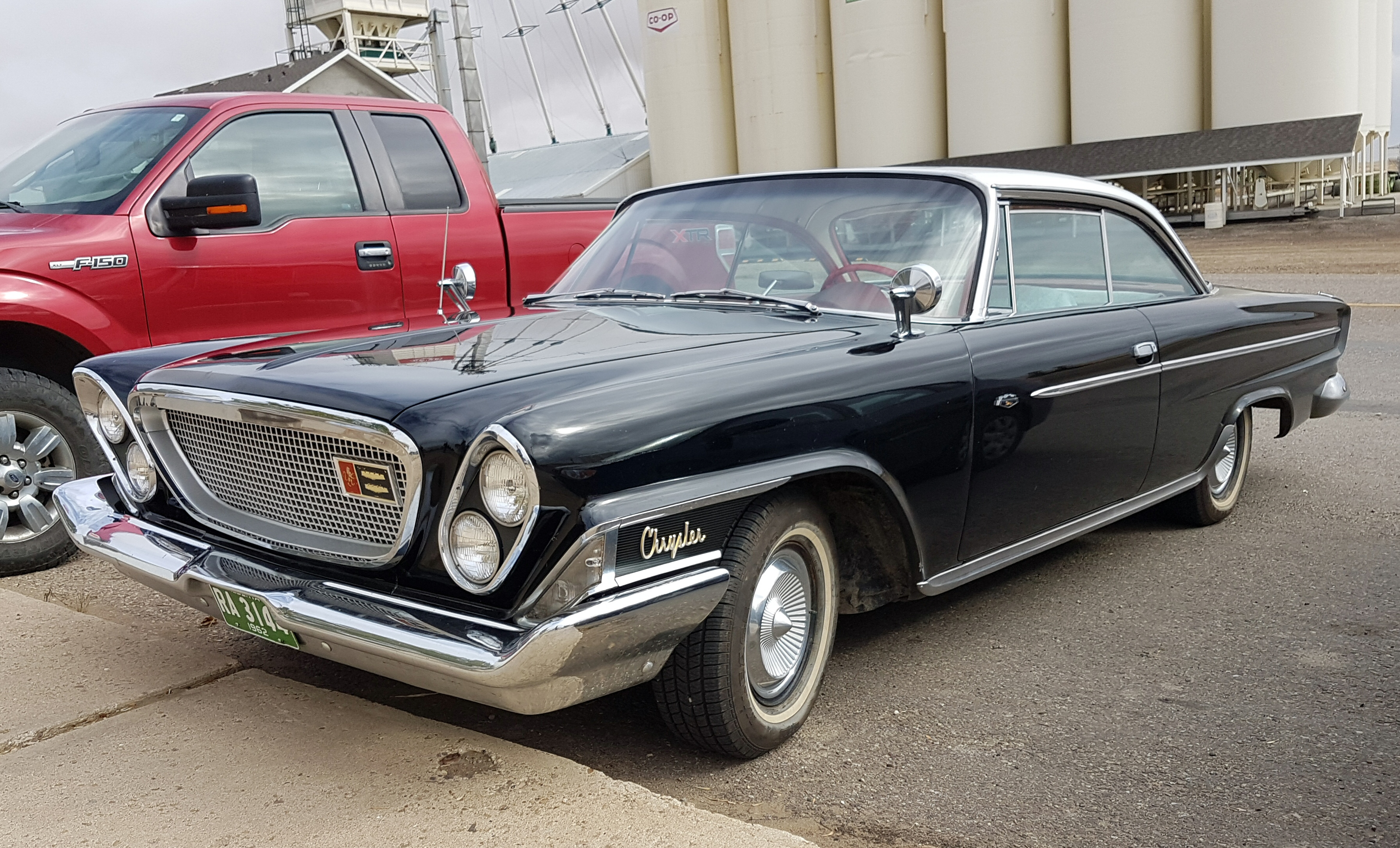
- 1962 Chrysler Newport hardtop coupe

Overview
- Manufacturer: Chrysler
- Production: 1940–1941; 1949–1950; 1960–1981

Body and chassis
- Class: Full-size car
- Layout: FR layout

Chronology
- Predecessor: DeSoto; Chrysler Windsor
- Successor: Chrysler New Yorker Landau; Chrysler Fifth Avenue

The Newport was a name used by Chrysler for both a hardtop body designation and also for its lowest priced model between 1961 and 1981. Chrysler first used the Newport name on a 1940 show car, of which five vehicles were produced. From 1950 to 1956, the Newport name was then used to designate any Chrysler model with a hardtop body style (for example, the 1956 Chrysler "New Yorker 2 Door Newport"). In 1961, Chrysler introduced the Newport as a new, low-priced model, offering large, comfortable two- and four-door Chrysler models that were modestly priced compared with the Chrysler 300, the Chrysler New Yorker and the Imperial. For 1961, the Newport was priced below the Chrysler Windsor (which originally replaced the Chrysler Royal) in the Windsor's final year.

== 1940s ==
First generation
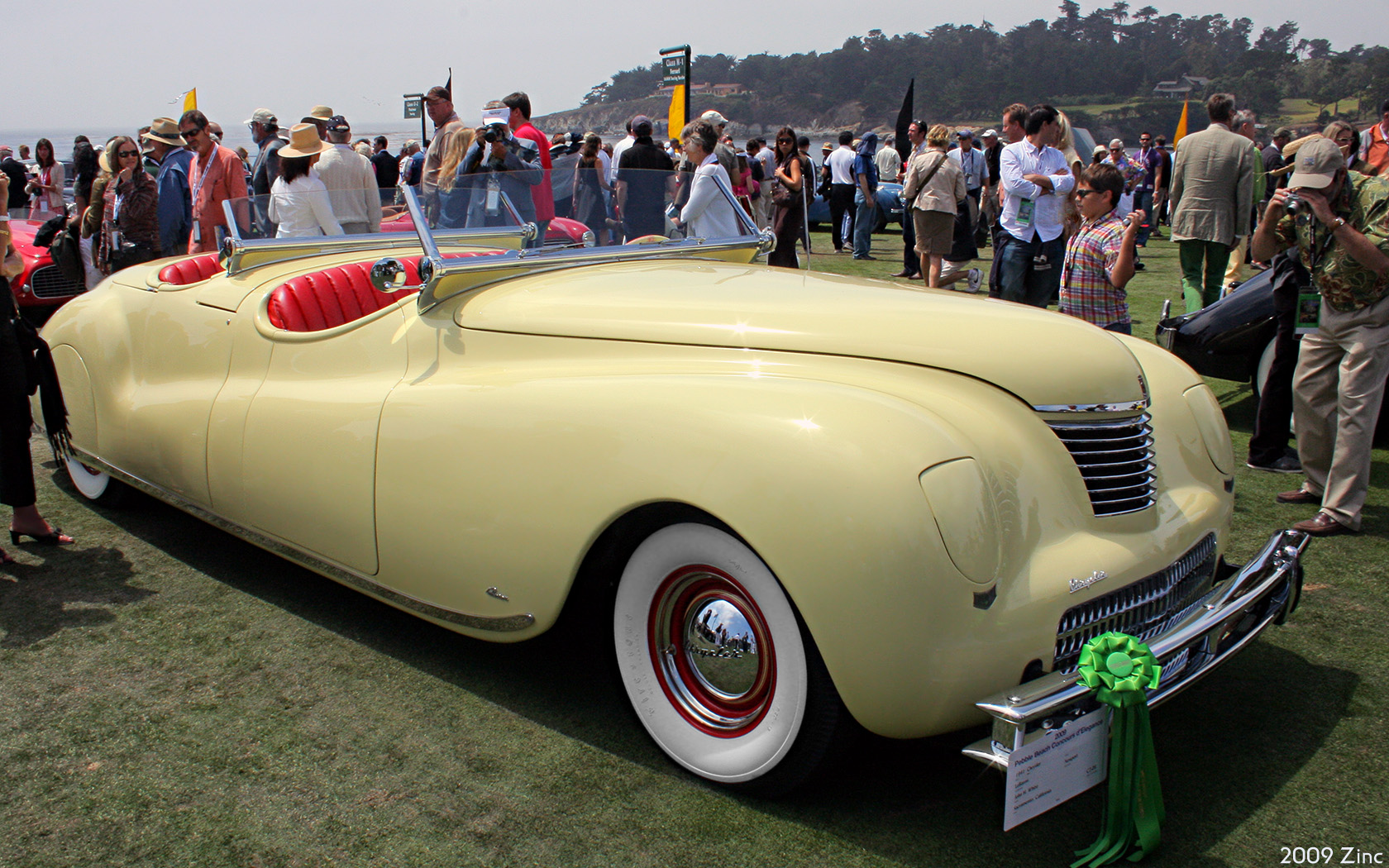

Overview
- Production: 1940–1941

Body and chassis
- Body style: 4-door dual cowl phaeton
- Related: Chrysler Imperial Crown

Powertrain
- Engine: 323.5 cu in (5.3 L) Chrysler Straight Eight "Spitfire"
- Transmission: 3-speed manual 3-speed fluid drive with overdrive 3-speed 'Vacamatic' overdrive (allowing clutch-less shifting between standard and overdrive ratios in second and third)

Dimensions
- Wheelbase: 145.5 in (3,696 mm) (Newport Phaeton); 127 in (3,226 mm) (Thunderbolt)

Chronology
- Successor: Chrysler Imperial Parade Phaeton

The first Newport, known as the Chrysler Newport Phaeton, was produced during 1940 and 1941. It was a dual-cowl phaeton that used the 323.5 cu in (5.3 L) Chrysler Straight Eight "Spitfire" engine with dual carburetors coupled to a three-speed manual transmission. The Newport was based upon the Chrysler Imperial Crown chassis and engine, and was designed by LeBaron / Briggs Manufacturing Company designer Ralph Roberts. Only six were built. Actress Lana Turner owned a Newport Phaeton, as did Chrysler founder Walter Chrysler, who used it as a personal car.

Five Newport Phaetons are known to exist today, while five Thunderbolts also show to have been manufactured, sharing the 127 in (3,226 mm) chassis and mechanicals with the Chrysler New Yorker. Futuristic features that were shared with both the Thunderbolt and the Newport Phaeton were electro-hydraulic doors, electric windows and covered headlights. The interior was particularly plush with leather upholstery and a bespoke aluminum dashboard. The chassis of the New Yorker was necessary to store the one-piece retractable top in the rear storage area for the Thunderbolt while a canvas top was used for the Newport Phaeton. The Thunderbolt was not installed with a traditional grille and instead received airflow to the radiator from below the bumper, in a bottom breather fashion. The roundness of both vehicles shows influences of an appearance during that time that was called "ponton" styling.

The Newport Phaeton served as the pace car for the 1941 Indianapolis 500 race. This pace car, chassis number C7807503, was the only one that did not have hide-away headlights and became the personal property of Walter P. Chrysler Jr. after the race. Photos of the car can be found here.

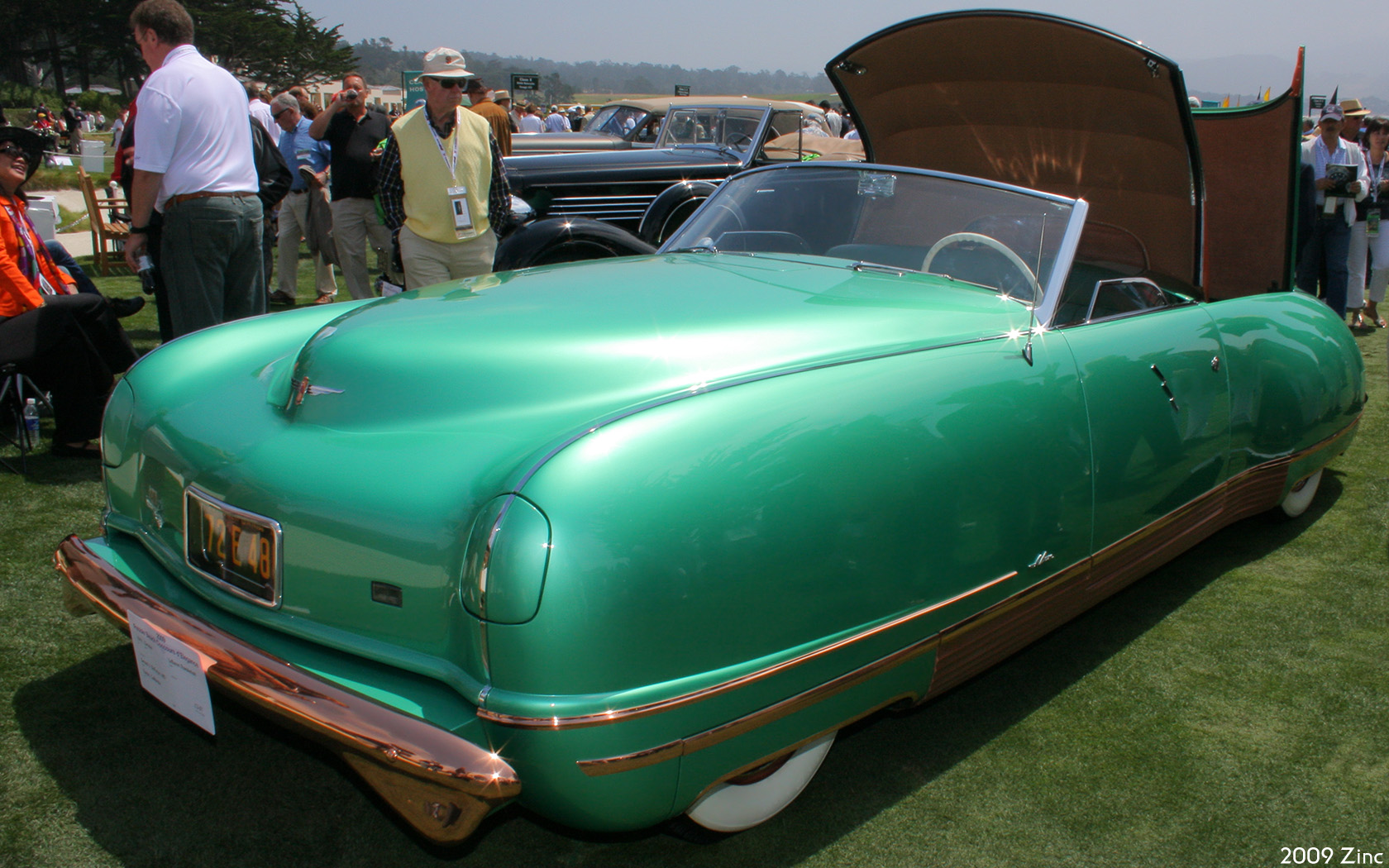
1941 Chrysler Thunderbolt

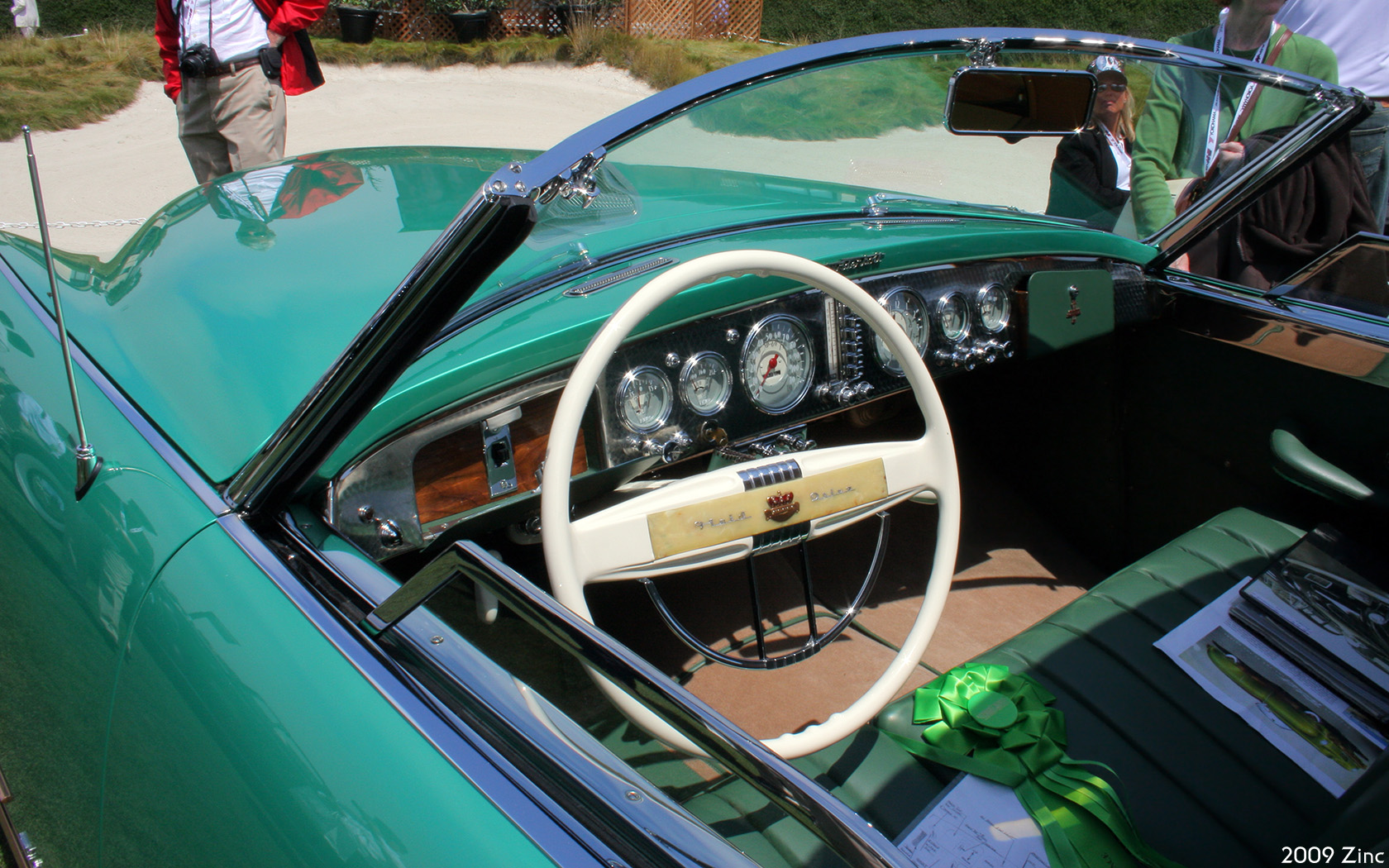
1941 Chrysler Thunderbolt

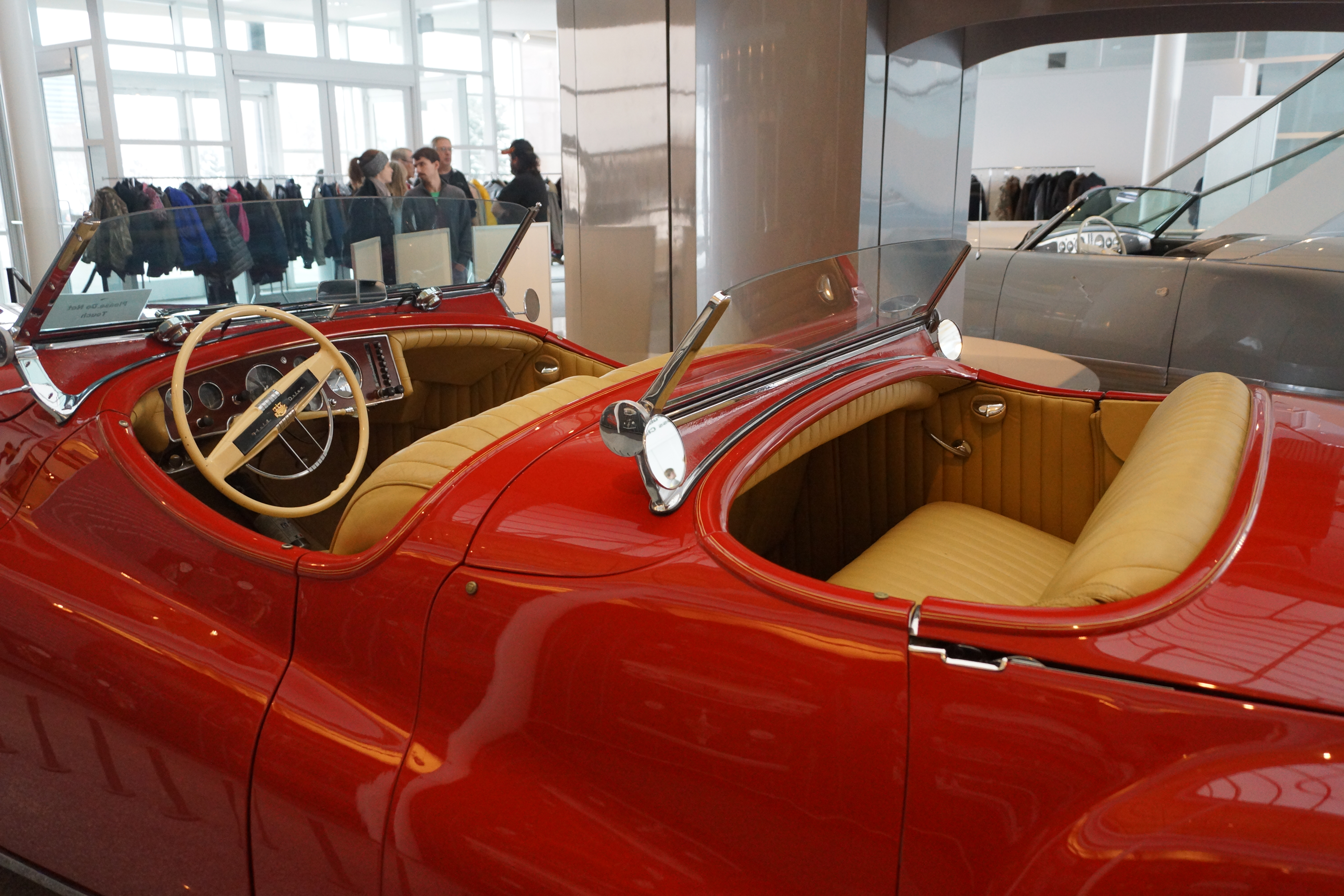
1941 Chrysler Newport Phaeton owned by Lana Turner

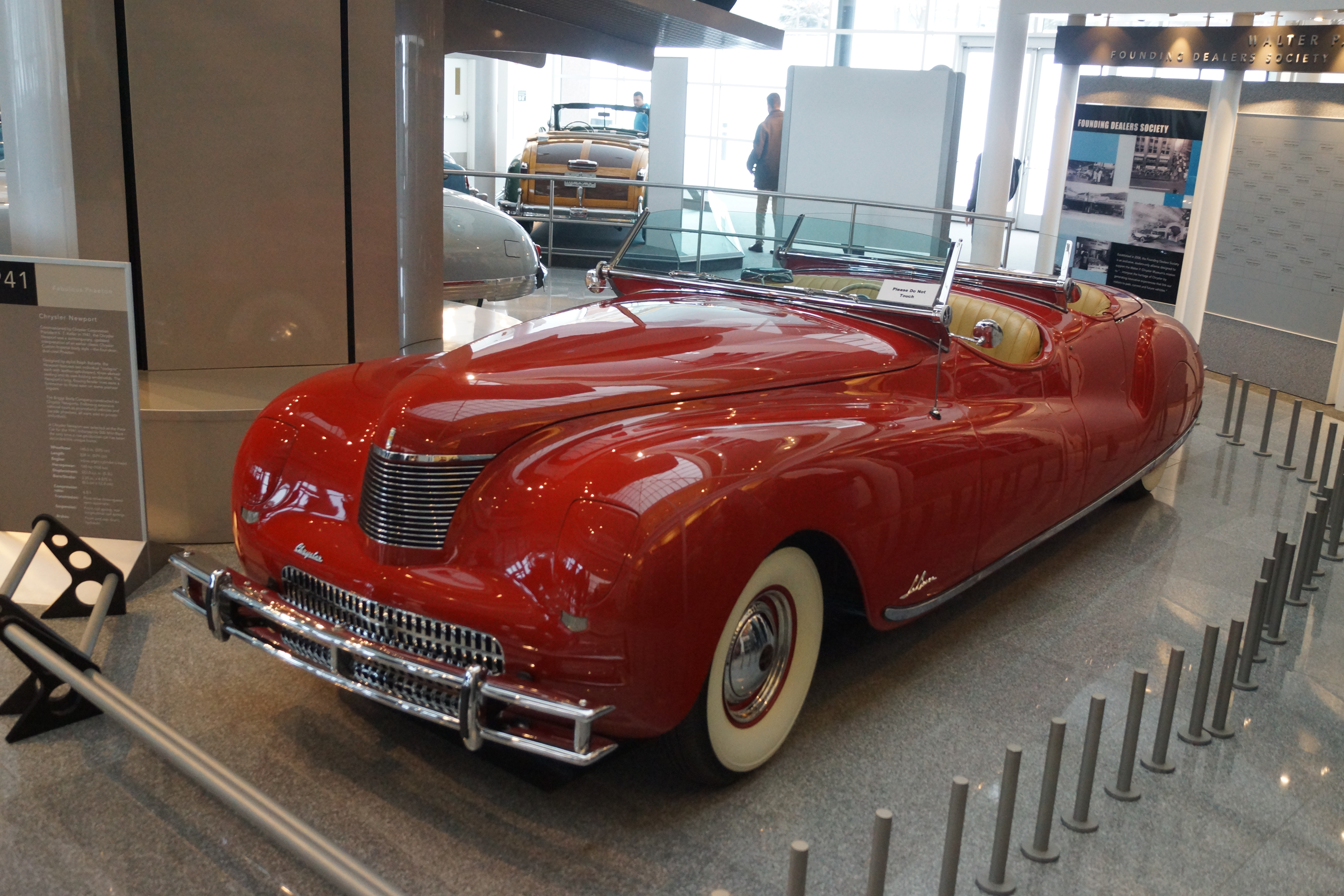
1941 Chrysler Newport Phaeton owned by Lana Turner

== 1950 to 1960 ==
Second generation
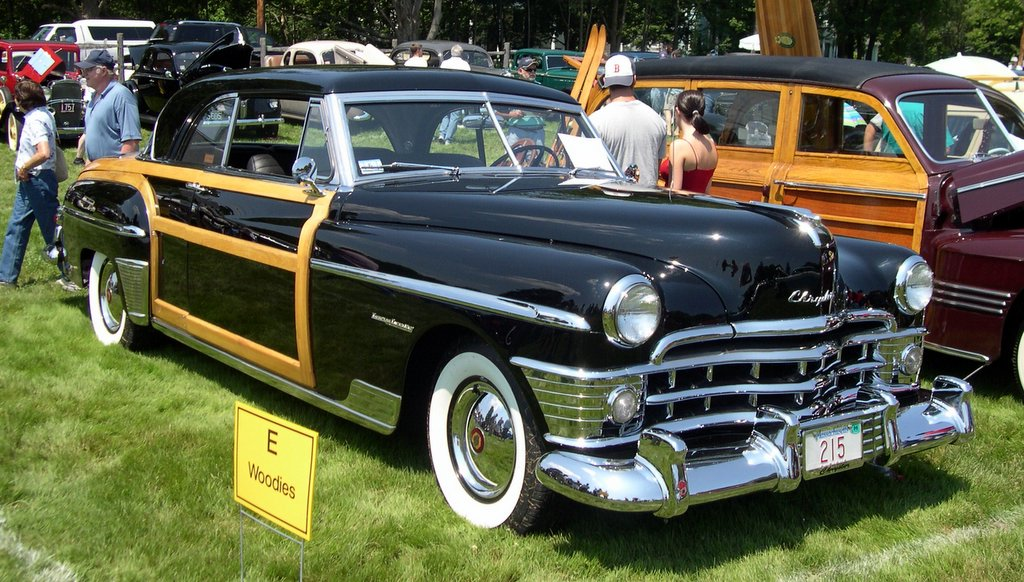
- 1950 Chrysler Town & Country Newport

Overview
- Model years: 1950–1960
- Assembly: Jefferson Avenue Assembly; Detroit, Michigan; Los Angeles (Maywood) Assembly; Los Angeles, California

Body and chassis
- Body style: 2-door coupe (1950–1959); 2-door sedan (1956–1959); 2-door hardtop 4-door hardtop
- Related: Chrysler Imperial; Chrysler New Yorker; Chrysler Windsor; Chrysler Saratoga; Chrysler 300; DeSoto Custom

Powertrain
- Engine: 323.5 cu in (5.3 L) Spitfire Straight Eight; 331 cu in (5.4 L) FirePower V8; 300.5 cu in (4.9 L) Poly V8(1955); 331 cu in (5.4 L) Poly V8
- Transmission: 2-speed Presto-Matic; 4-speed Fluid Drive; 3-speed manual PowerFlite automatic

Dimensions
- Wheelbase: 125.5 in (3,188 mm) (Windsor); 128.5 in (3,264 mm) (Saratoga); 131.5 in (3,340 mm) (New Yorker); 133.0 in (3,378 mm) (Imperial)
- Length: 207.25 in (5,264 mm) (Windsor)

The 1949 Town and Country was first proposed as a hardtop, however the body style only appeared in the model's final year in 1950, followed by the Town and Country nameplate designated for station wagons only in 1951. Chrysler did briefly offer a hardtop coupe under the Town and Country labeled the "Custom Club Coupe" in 1946 but very few were manufactured. In 1950, the Newport name was used to designate the two-door hardtop (no B-pillar) body style in Chrysler's lineup, to include the Windsor, Saratoga, New Yorker and Imperial, while DeSoto also offered the hardtop using the Sportsman nameplate, and Dodge used the nameplate Lancer.

In 1955 a hardtop was introduced as the Imperial Newport for one year, while the nameplate continued to be offered on the Windsor Newport, Saratoga Newport and New Yorker Newport. In 1956 the model name was updated to identify two-door and four-door hardtops except for the Chrysler 300 lettered cars which were only available as a two-door hardtop or convertible. Imperial continued to offer a hardtop also starting in 1956, but to distinguish it from other Chrysler products, the Imperial hardtop was renamed Southampton until 1963. Briefly in 1955, Chrysler used the nameplates St. Regis for the New Yorker and Nassau for the Windsor hardtops with two-tone paint schemes but ended the practice in 1956.

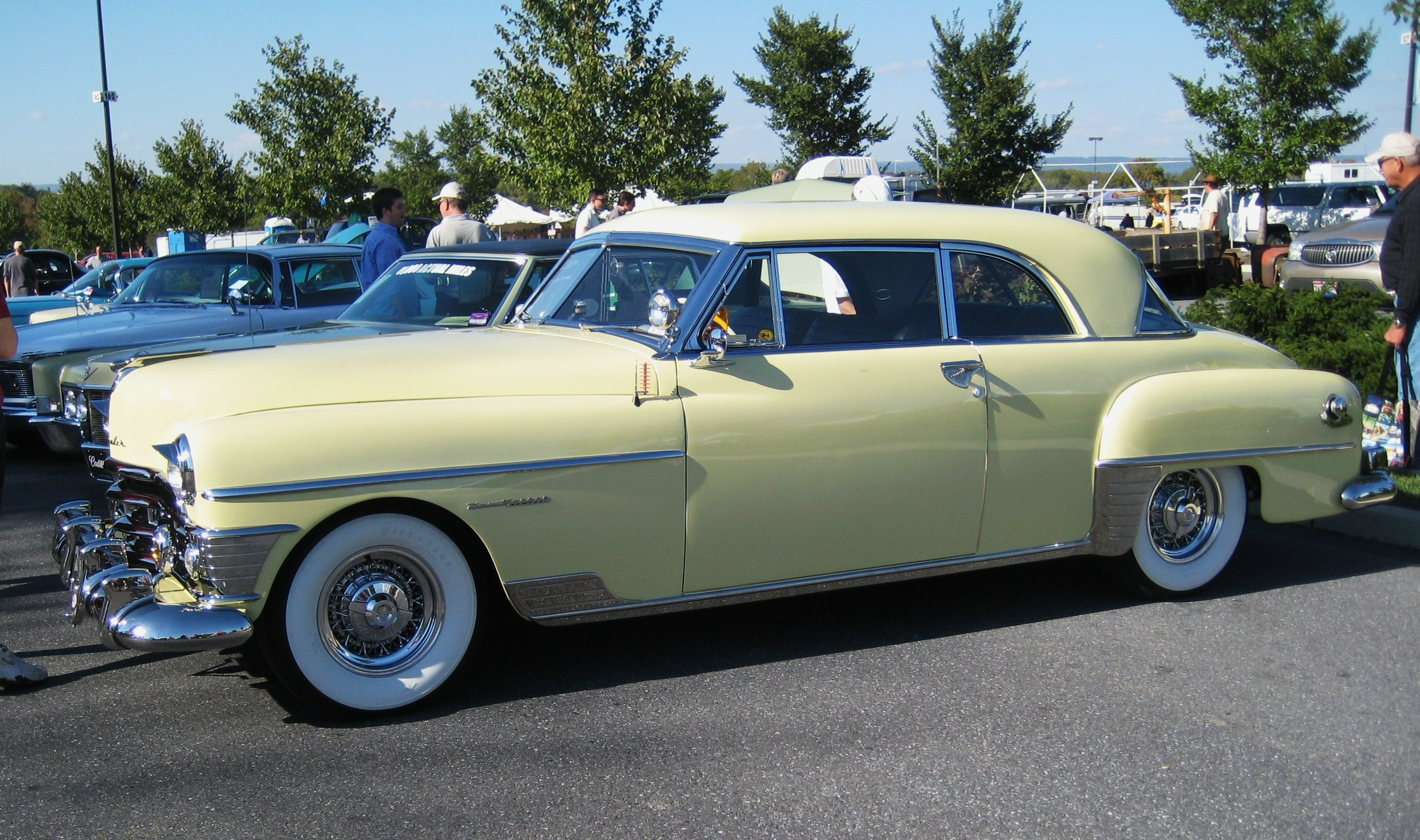
1951 Chrysler New Yorker Deluxe Newport hardtop coupe

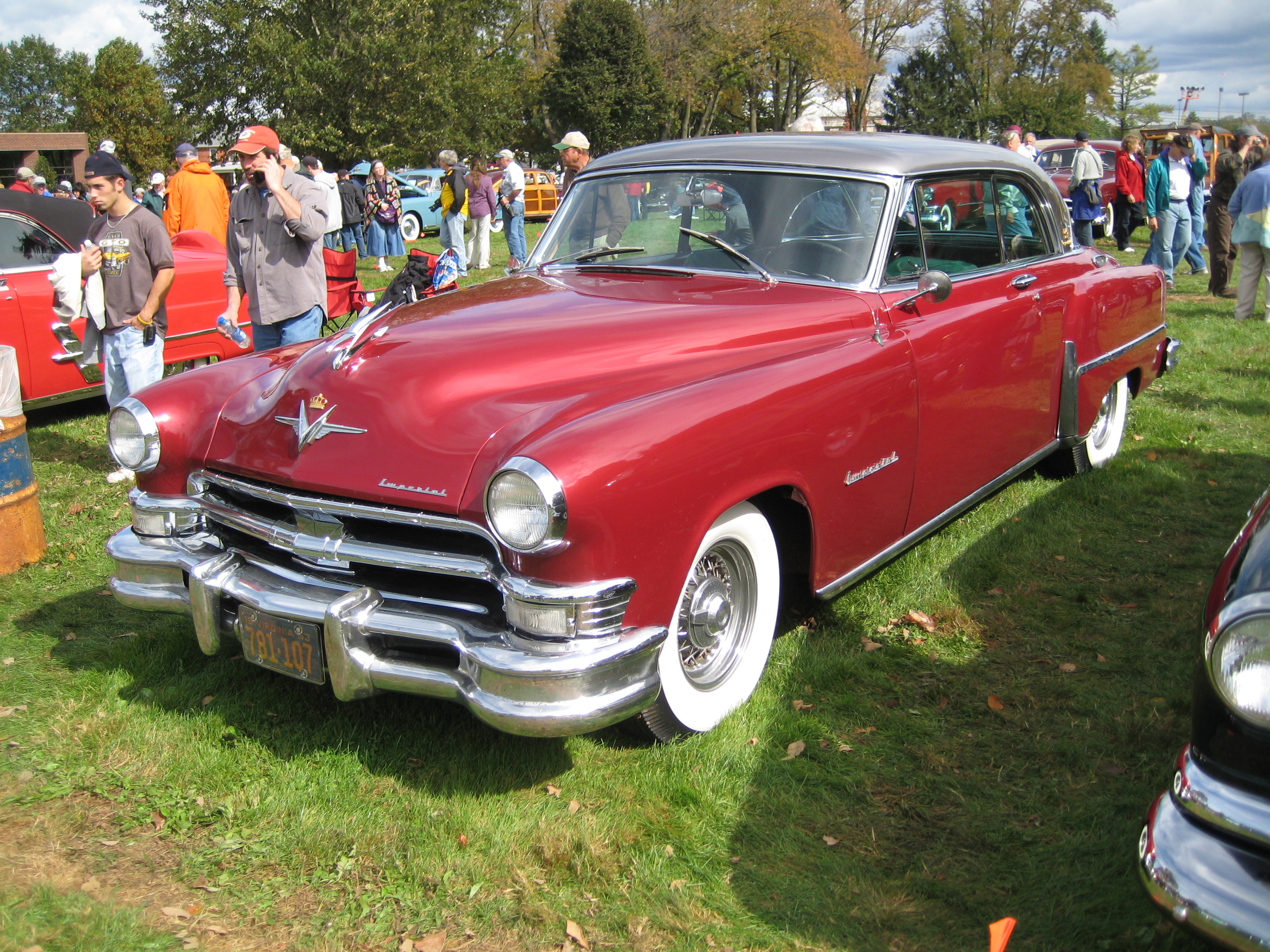
1953 Chrysler Imperial Custom Newport hardtop coupe

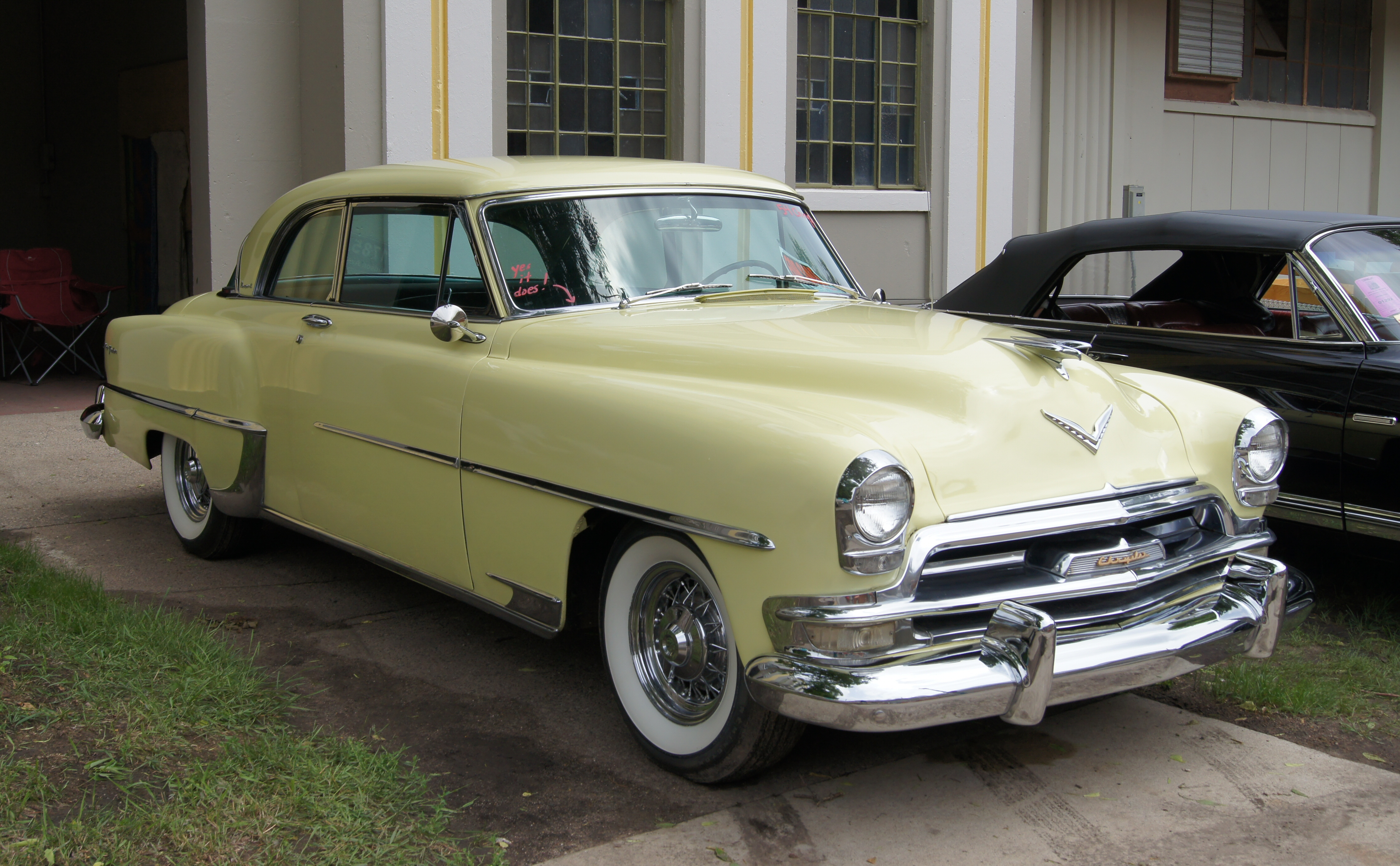
1954 Chrysler New Yorker Deluxe Newport hardtop coupe

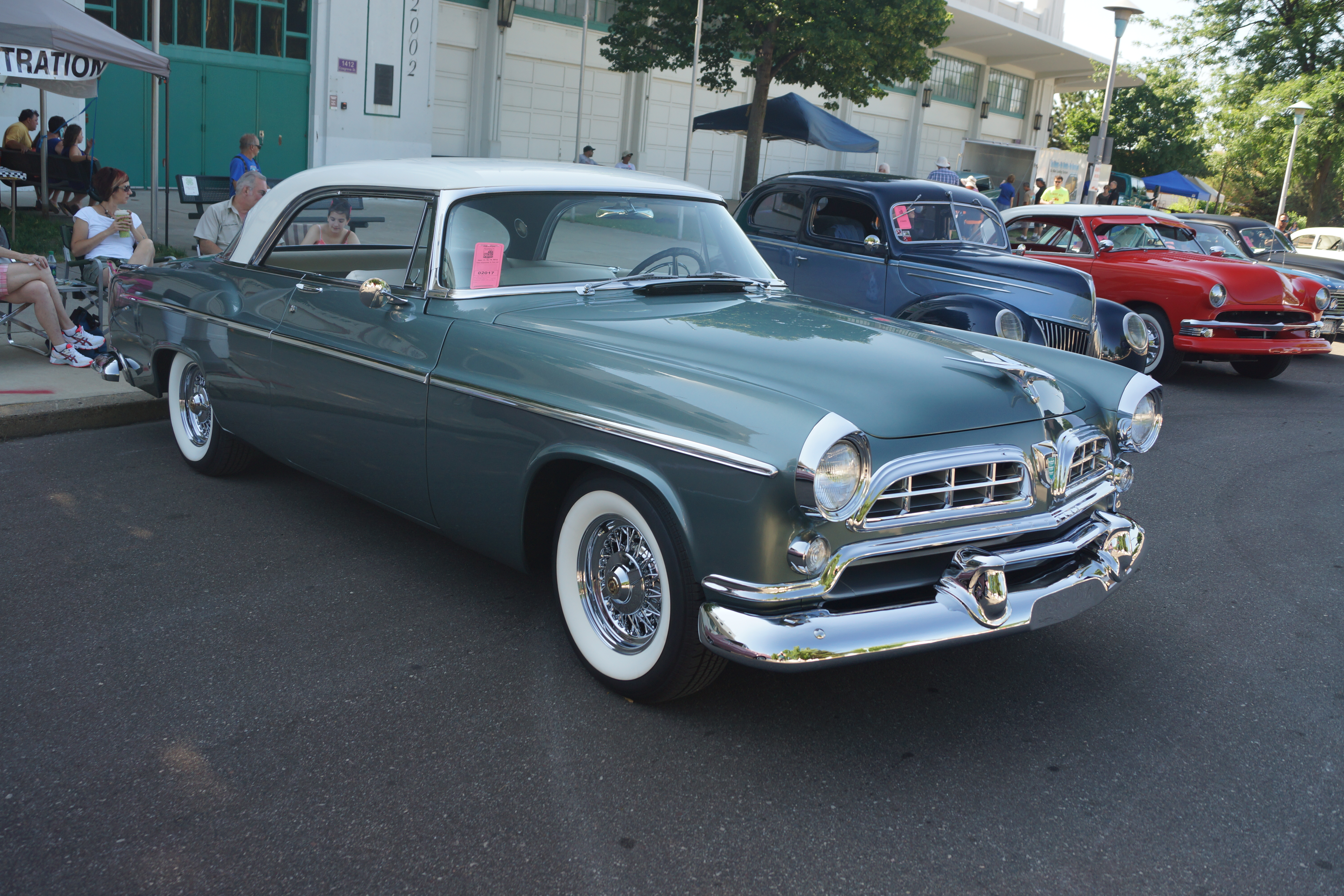
1955 Chrysler Windsor Deluxe Newport hardtop coupe

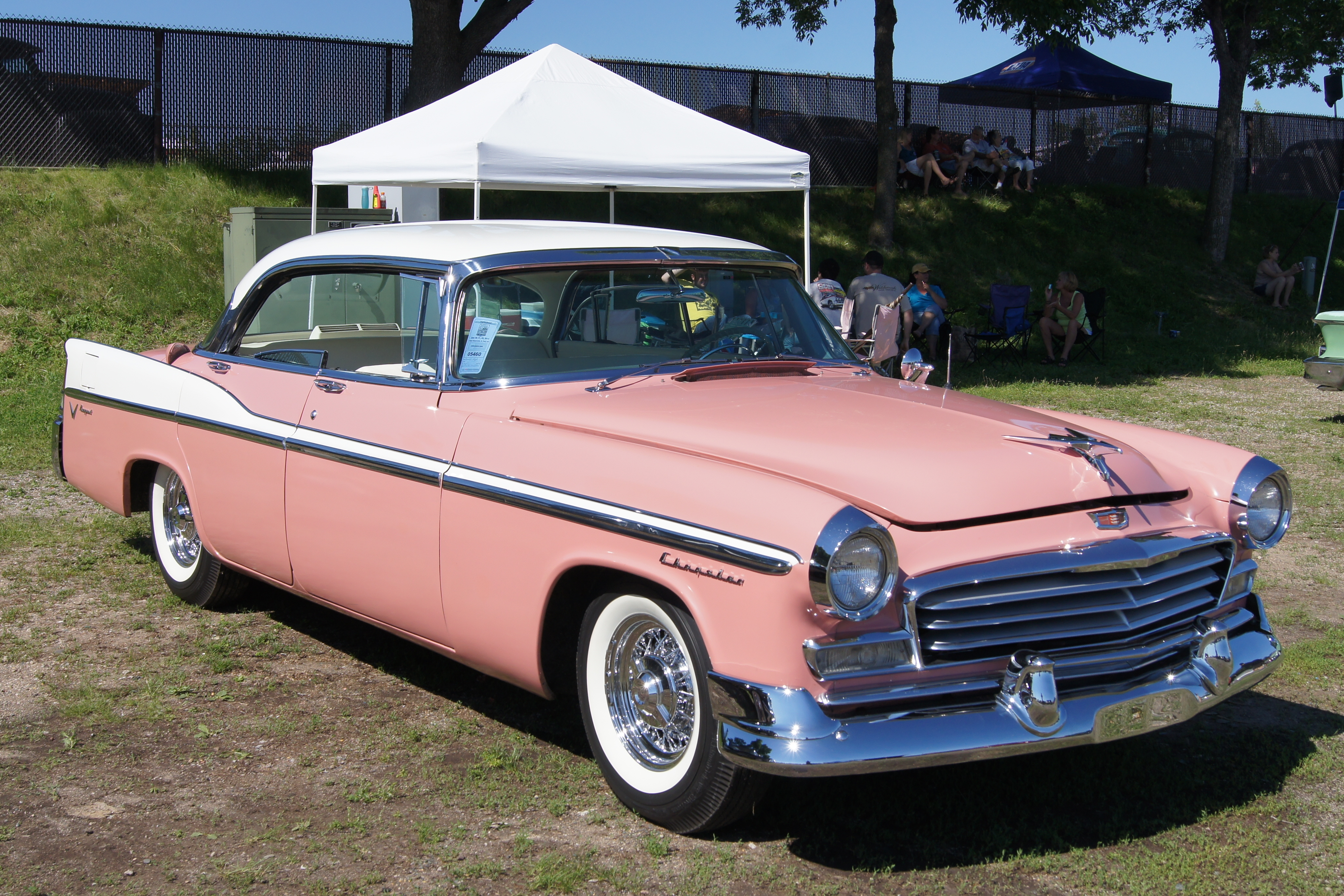
1956 Chrysler Windsor Newport hardtop sedan

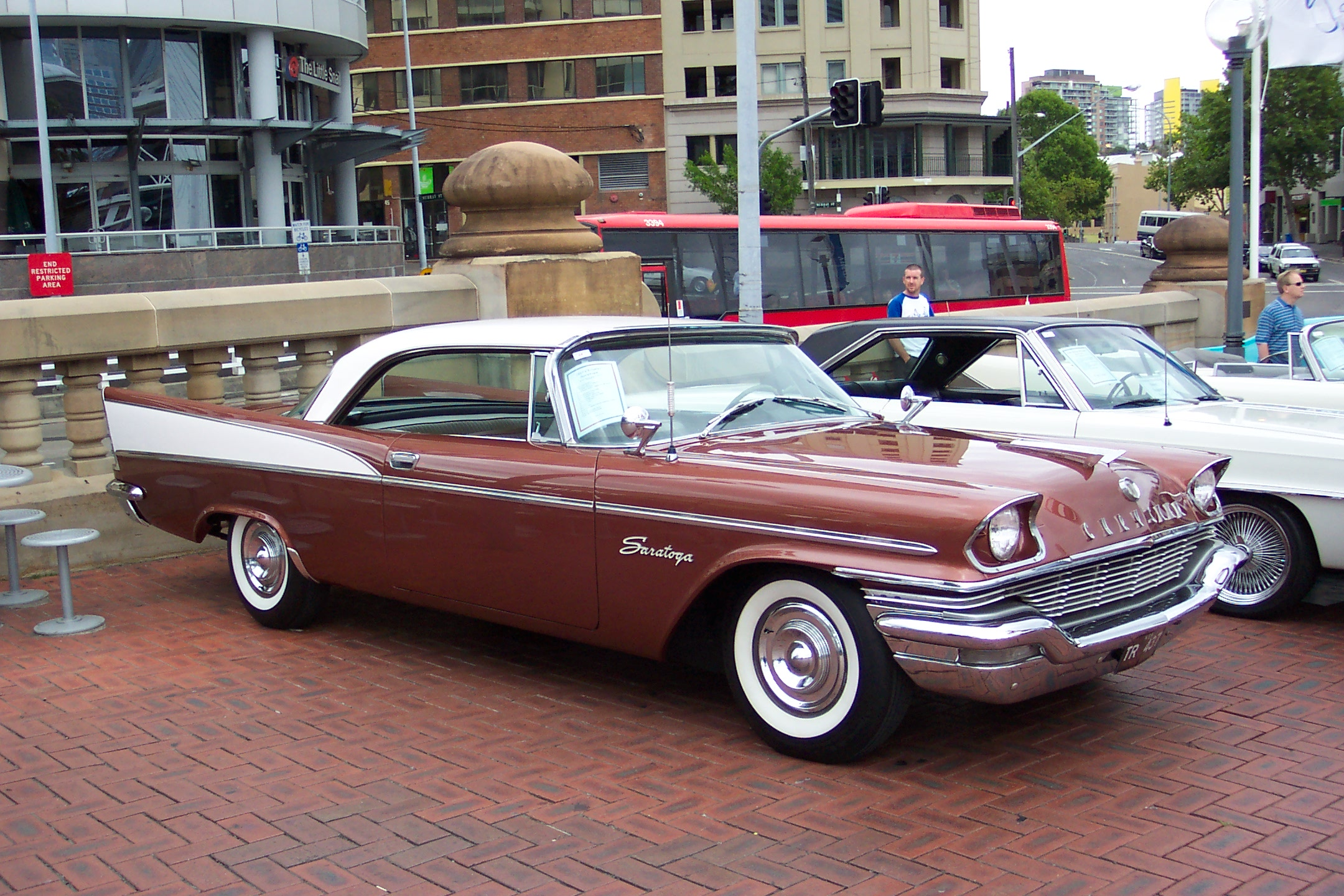
1957 Chrysler Saratoga Newport hardtop coupe

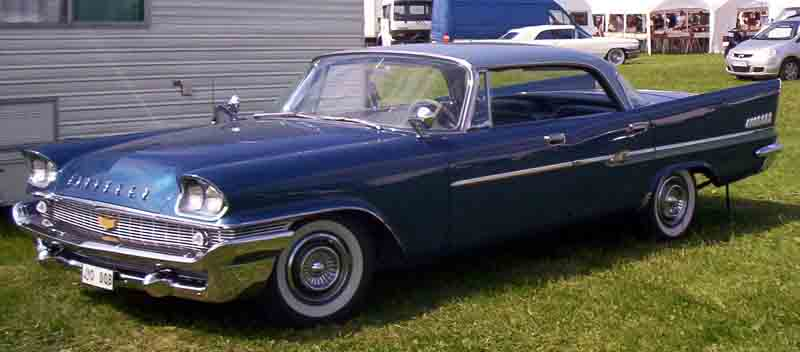
1958 Chrysler New Yorker Newport hardtop sedan

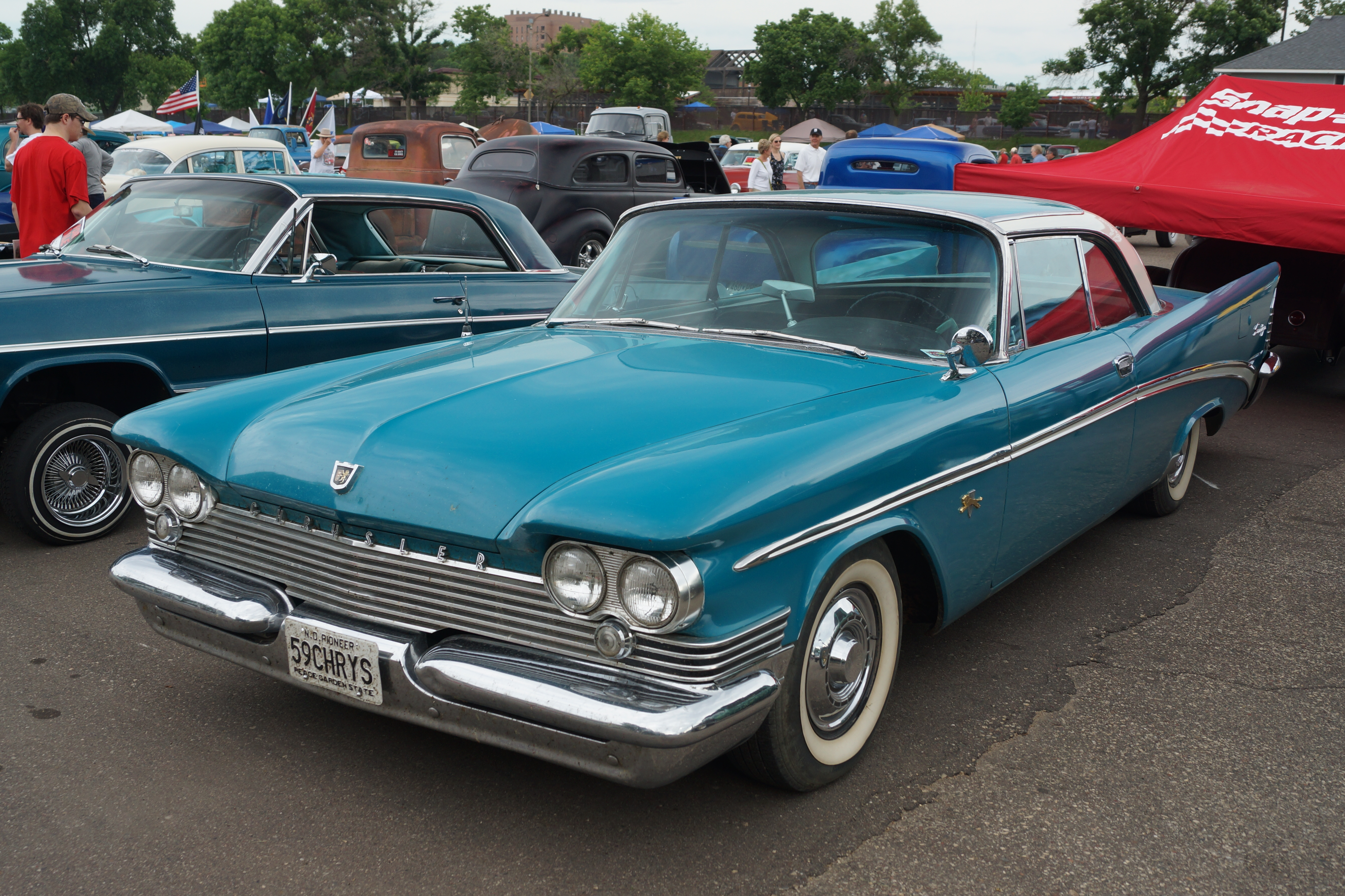
1959 Chrysler Saratoga Newport hardtop coupe

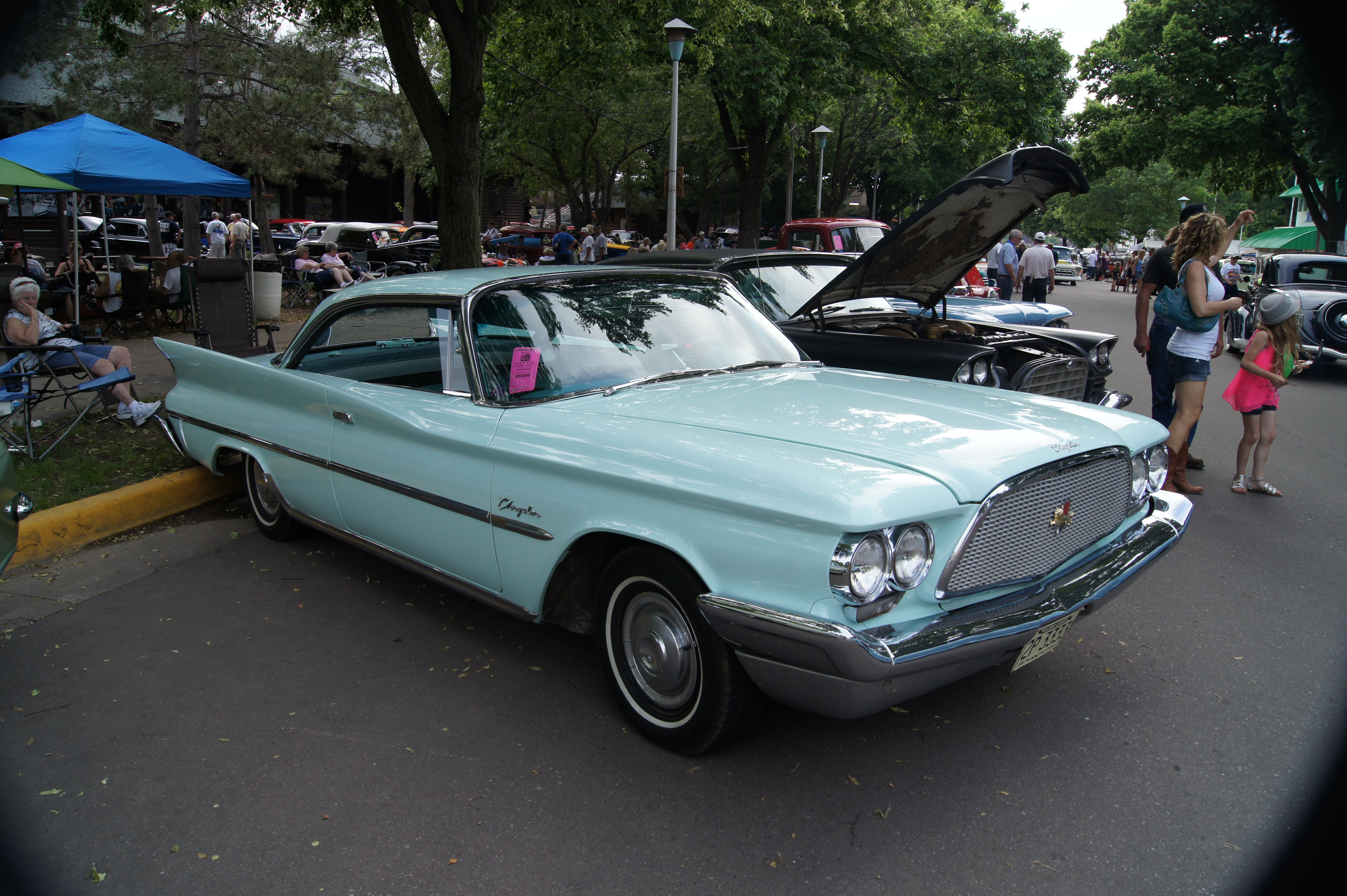
1960 Chrysler Windsor Newport hardtop coupe

== 1961–1964 ==
Third generation
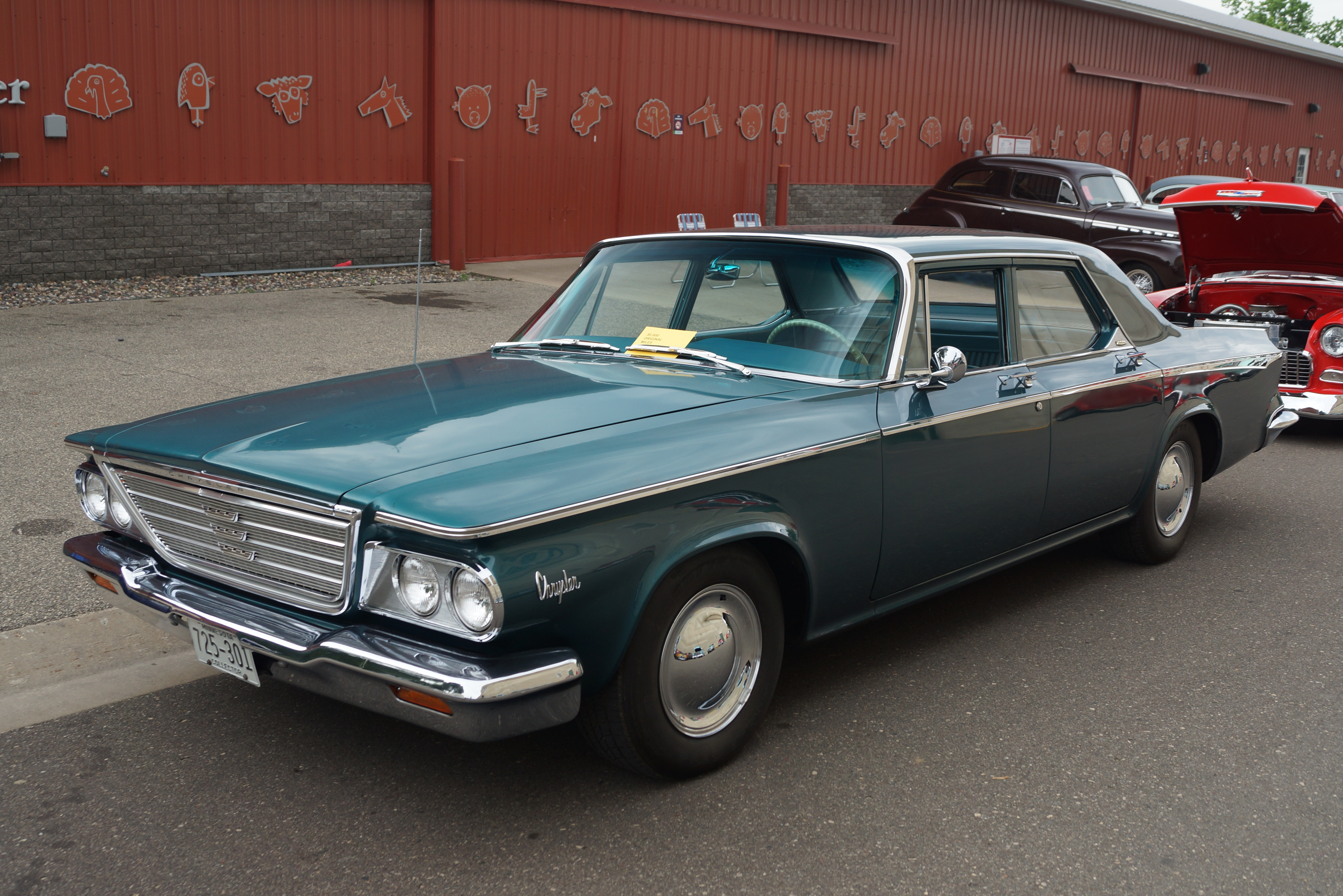
- 1964 Chrysler Newport 4-Door Sedan

Overview
- Production: 1960–1964
- Model years: 1961–1964
- Assembly: Jefferson Avenue Assembly; Detroit, Michigan; Los Angeles (Maywood) Assembly; Los Angeles, California
- Designer: Virgil Exner

Body and chassis
- Body style: 4-door sedan 4-door hardtop 2-door hardtop 2-door convertible 4-door hardtop station wagon
- Related: Chrysler 300; Chrysler New Yorker; Imperial Crown; Dodge Custom 880

Powertrain
- Engine: 361 cu in (5.9 L) Firebolt V8; 383 cu in (6.3 L) Firebolt V8 (T&C only); 413 cu in (6.8 L) Firebolt V8
- Transmission: 3-speed automatic PowerFlite automatic 3-speed manual

Dimensions
- Wheelbase: 122 in (3,099 mm)
- Length: 214.9–216.4 in (5,458–5,497 mm)
- Width: 79.4 in (2,017 mm)
- Height: 55.9 in (1,420 mm)
- Curb weight: 3,650–4,215 lb (1,656–1,912 kg)

Chrysler updated the Newport nameplate as a separate model for 1961, and starting with 1960, all Chrysler models adopted the grille appearance from the Chrysler 300F. At a base price of $2,964 ($32,257 in 2025 dollars), the Newport was the least expensive Chrysler model, intended to appeal to owners of the discontinued DeSoto brand. While the Newport was successful and comprised the bulk of Chrysler production, the base Newport sedans were modest trim package versions of Chrysler's traditional upscale models, featuring smaller hubcaps instead of full-wheel covers, plain interiors and a minimal amount of exterior trim. By contrast, the next model up, the New Yorker, retailed for $4,870 ($53,000 in 2025 dollars) Advertising took pains to emphasize the Newport was not a compact car, describing it as "a full-size Chrysler in a new lower price range" and using "no jr. editions" as a tagline.

In 1961, the Newport was available as a two-door convertible, two-door hardtop, four-door sedan, four-door hardtop and four-door station wagon. The base engine for the Newport was the 361 cu in (5.9 L) V8 engine rated at 265 hp (198 kW; 269 PS). Optional was the 413 cu in (6.8 L) and the 383 cu in (6.3 L) that was mostly used in the Town and Country station wagons. All Newports could have been ordered with the 413 either single or dual four-bbl carbs and most of the 300 letter car options, except the four bucket seats, center console, and tachometer. A three-speed manual transmission was standard, but seldom ordered. The dash had been designed with Chrysler's push-button controls for the TorqueFlite automatic in mind, with the "AstraDome" instrument cluster covering the part of the steering column a column shifter would come out from under then-standard practice, so manual cars used a floor shifter. Due to the installation of the "AstraDome" instrument cluster extending outward towards the steering wheel, the traditional installation of the turn signal lever was relocated to the dashboard underneath the TorqueFlite pushbutton gear selectors and was installed as a sliding lever that would return to center as the steering wheel returned to the center position.

Station wagons from 1961 through 1964 featured hardtop body styling, with no "B" pillar. The canted headlight approach was previously used by Lincoln, and briefly by Buick, but by 1961 when this generation was introduced the feature was unique to Chrysler.

Because the program to create all-new Chryslers for 1962 was abruptly canceled in 1960, all of the 1962 Newport models, with the exception of the Town & Country station wagon, were instead created by taking the front end of a 1961 Newport (updated for 1962) and mating it to the de-finned body of a corresponding 1961 Dodge Polara model. The 1961 Polara's existing tailfins and taillights were replaced by redesigned rear-quarter panels which furnished the 1962 Newports with finless rear fenders and new taillights. In a similar fashion, the 1962 Newport Town & Country station wagon was created by mating the updated front end of a 1961 Newport to the body of a 1961 Plymouth Suburban 4-door station wagon. A Plymouth wagon was chosen because it was Chrysler Corporation's only finless full-sized station wagon.

The Newport was restyled alongside the New Yorker and Chrysler 300 for 1963, with this body style continuing for 1964. The 1963 model year was a major restyle without any tail fins. The 1964s saw the return of small, chrome-topped fins.

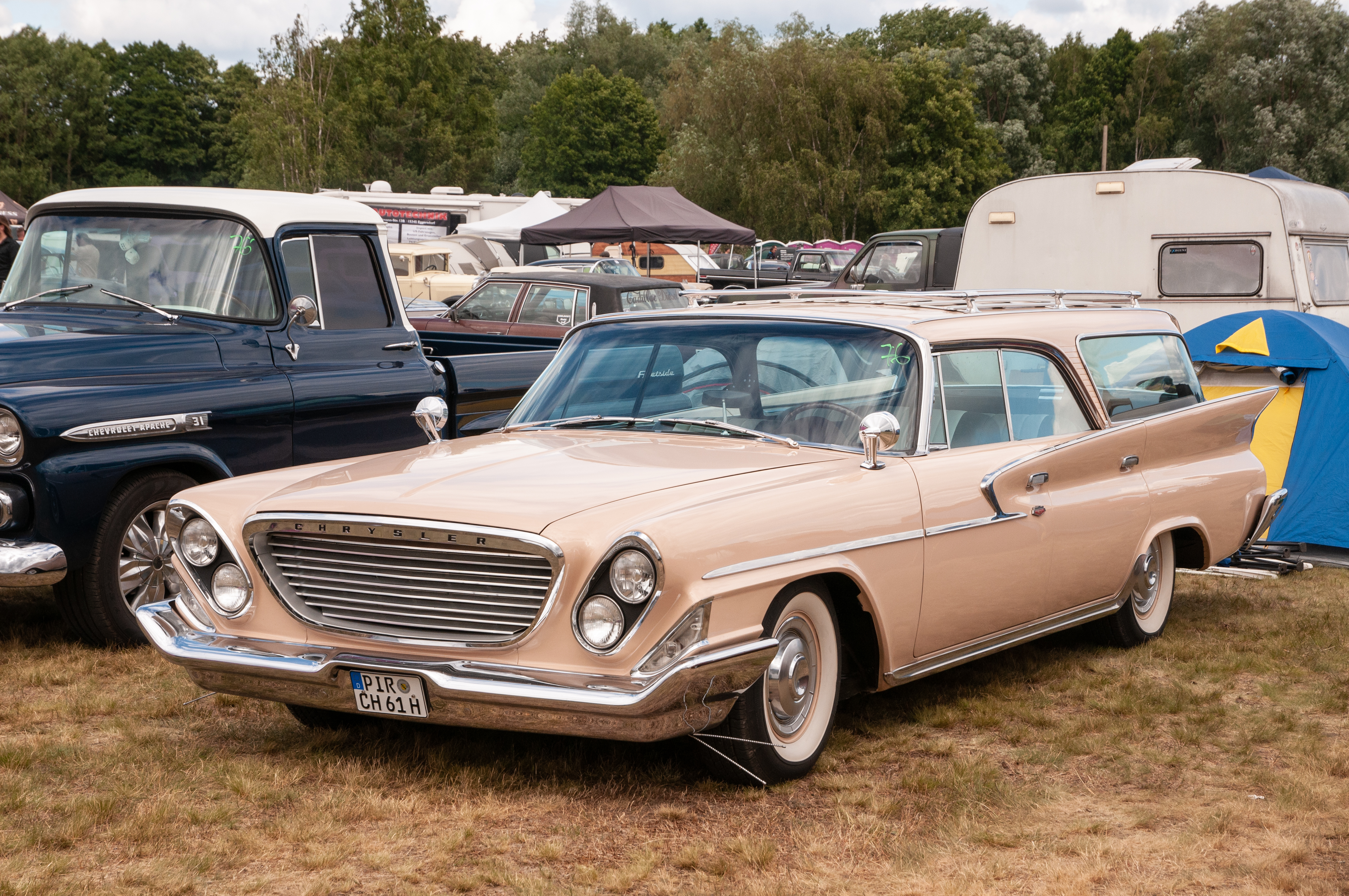
1961 Chrysler Newport Town & Country station wagon

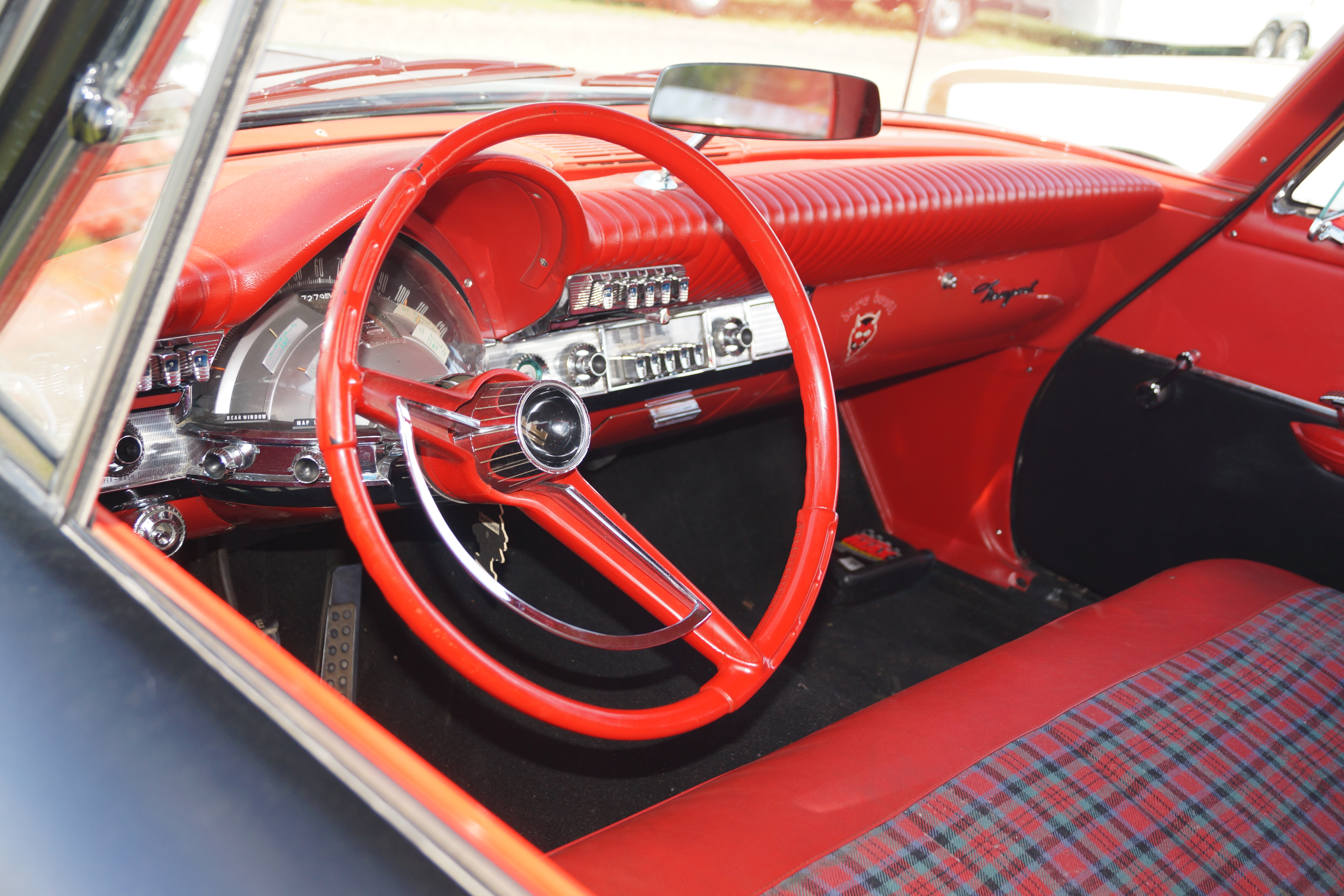
1961 Chrysler Newport interior

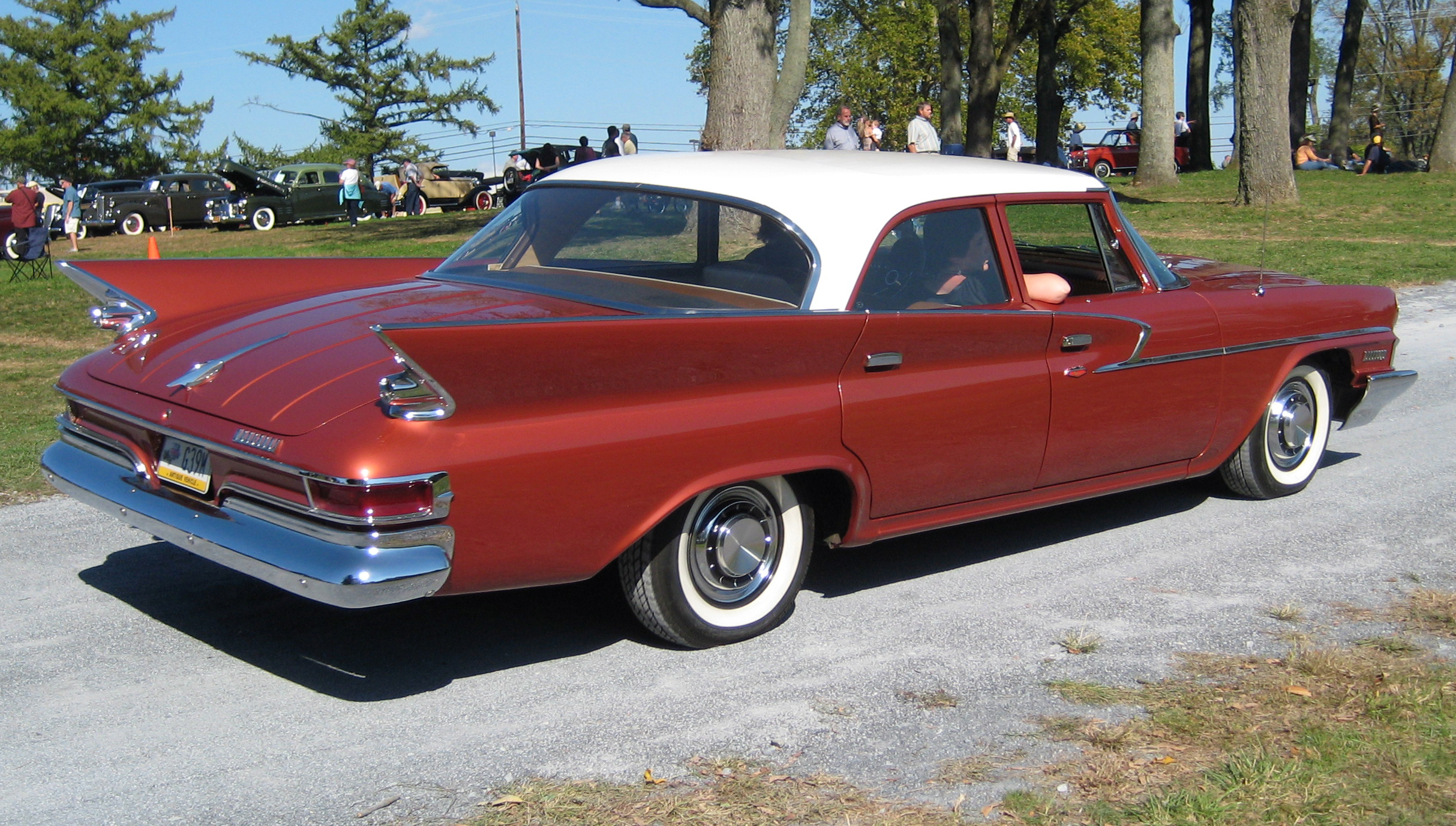
The 1961 Newport had prominent tailfins

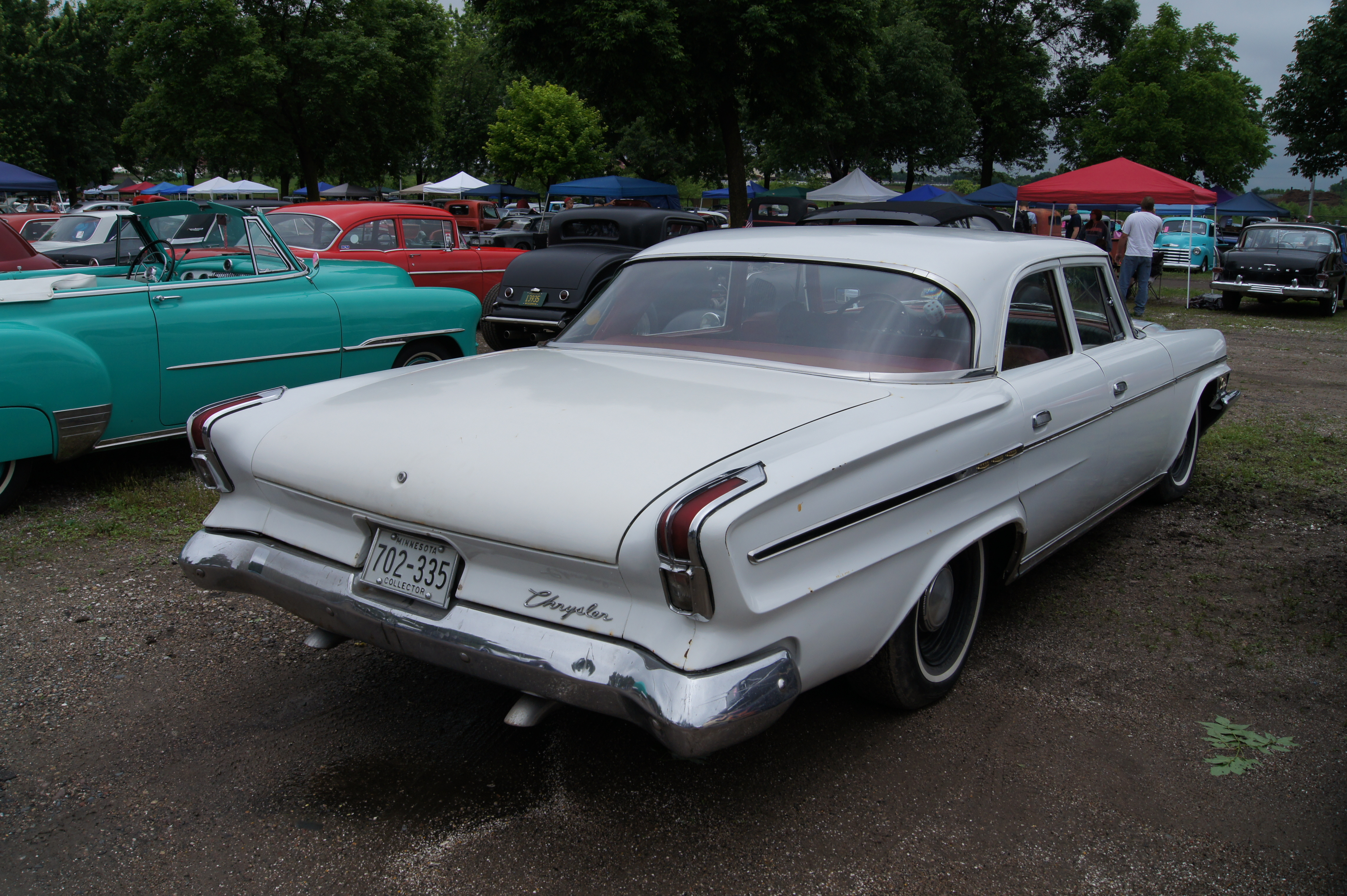
By 1962 the tailfins were completely gone

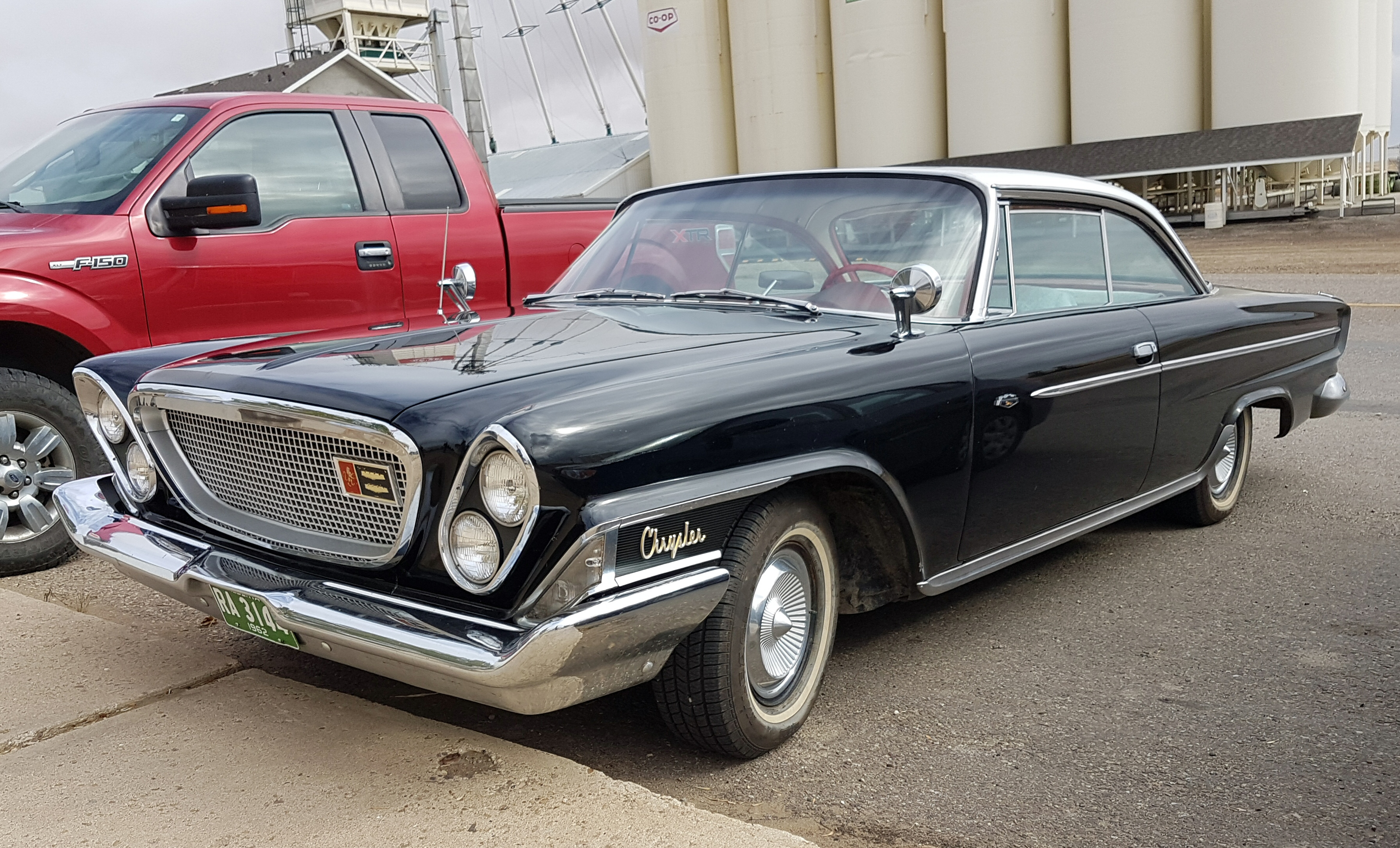
1962 Chrysler Newport two-door hardtop

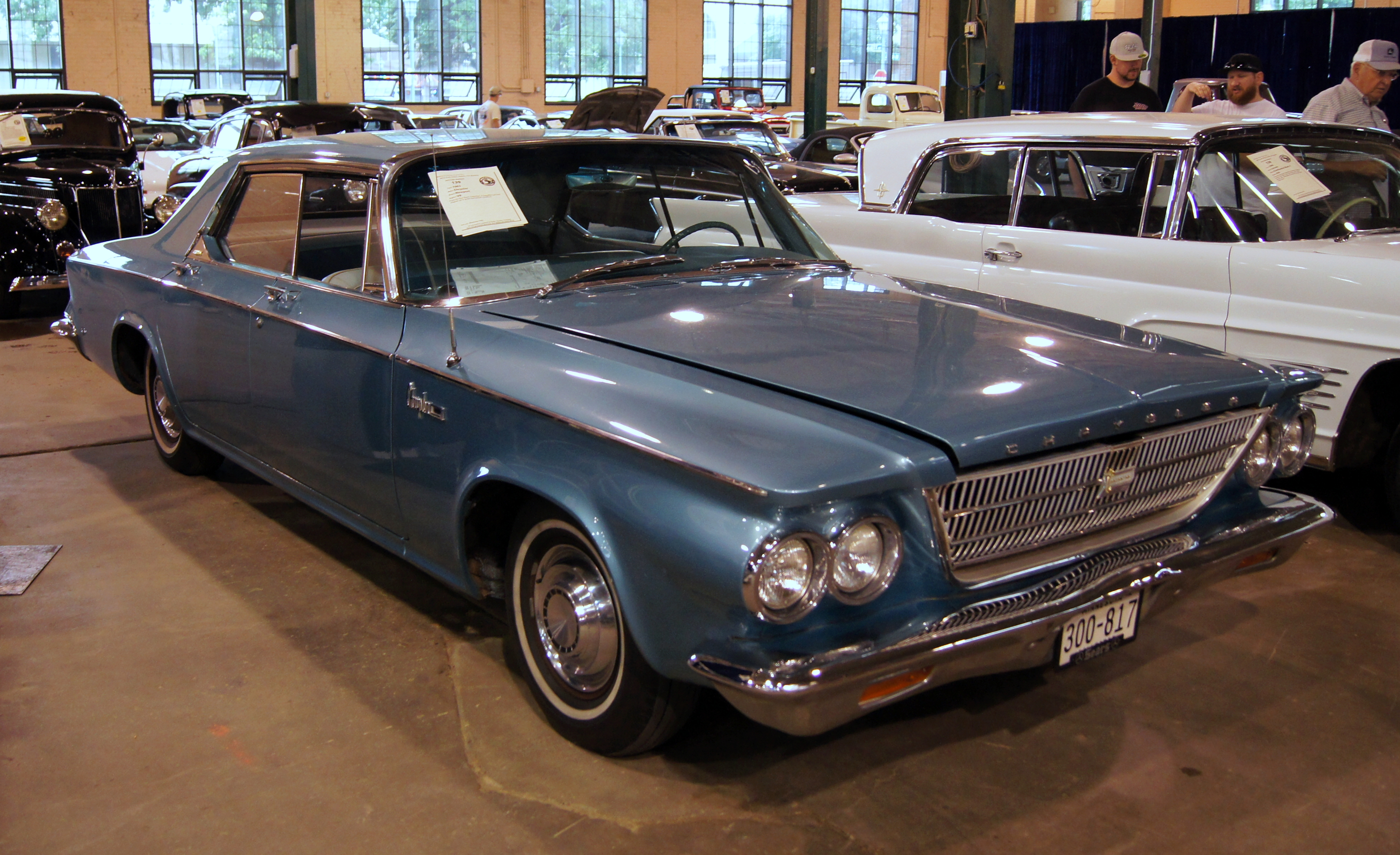
1963 Chrysler Newport four-door hardtop

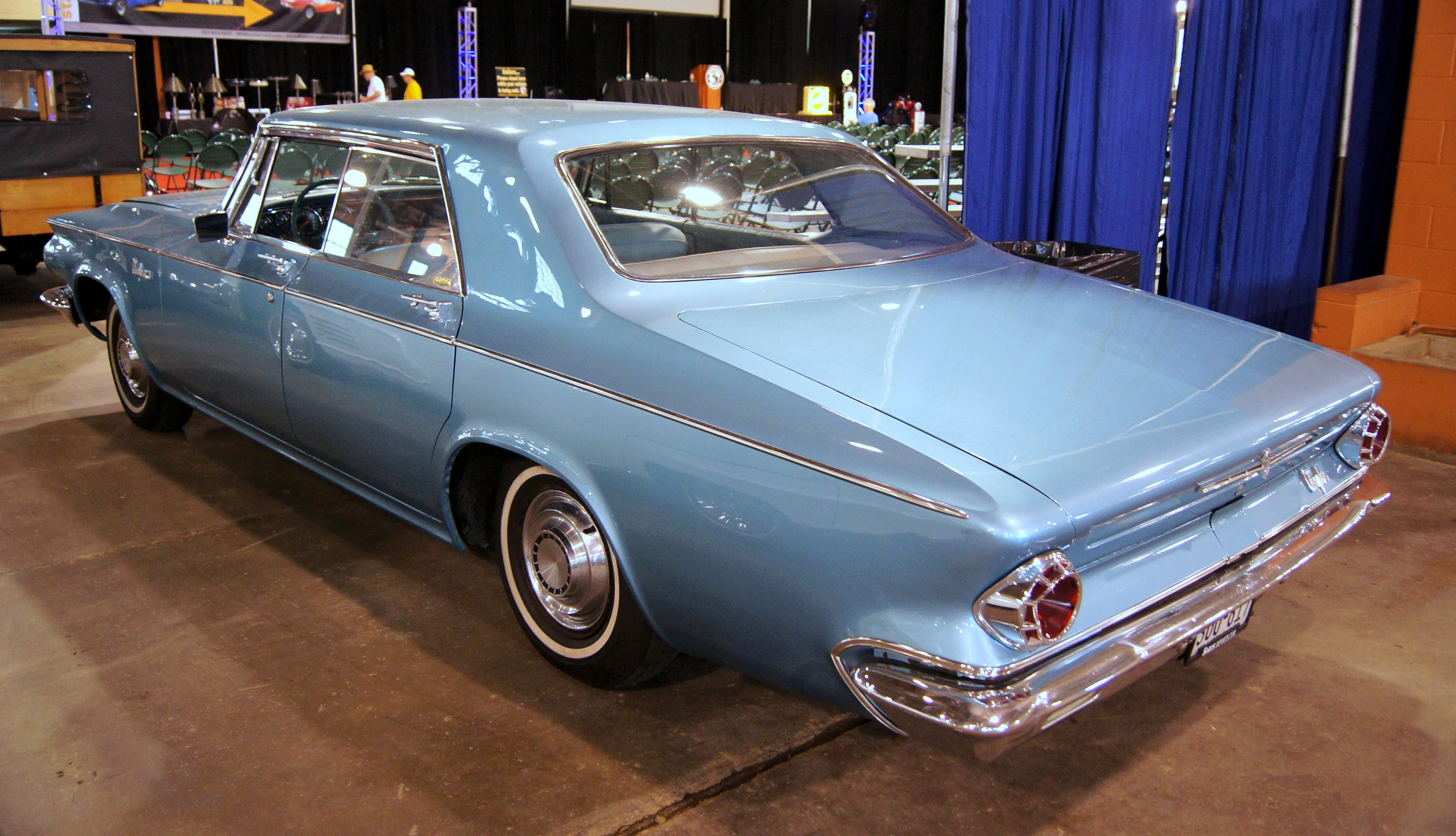
1963 Chrysler Newport four-door hardtop

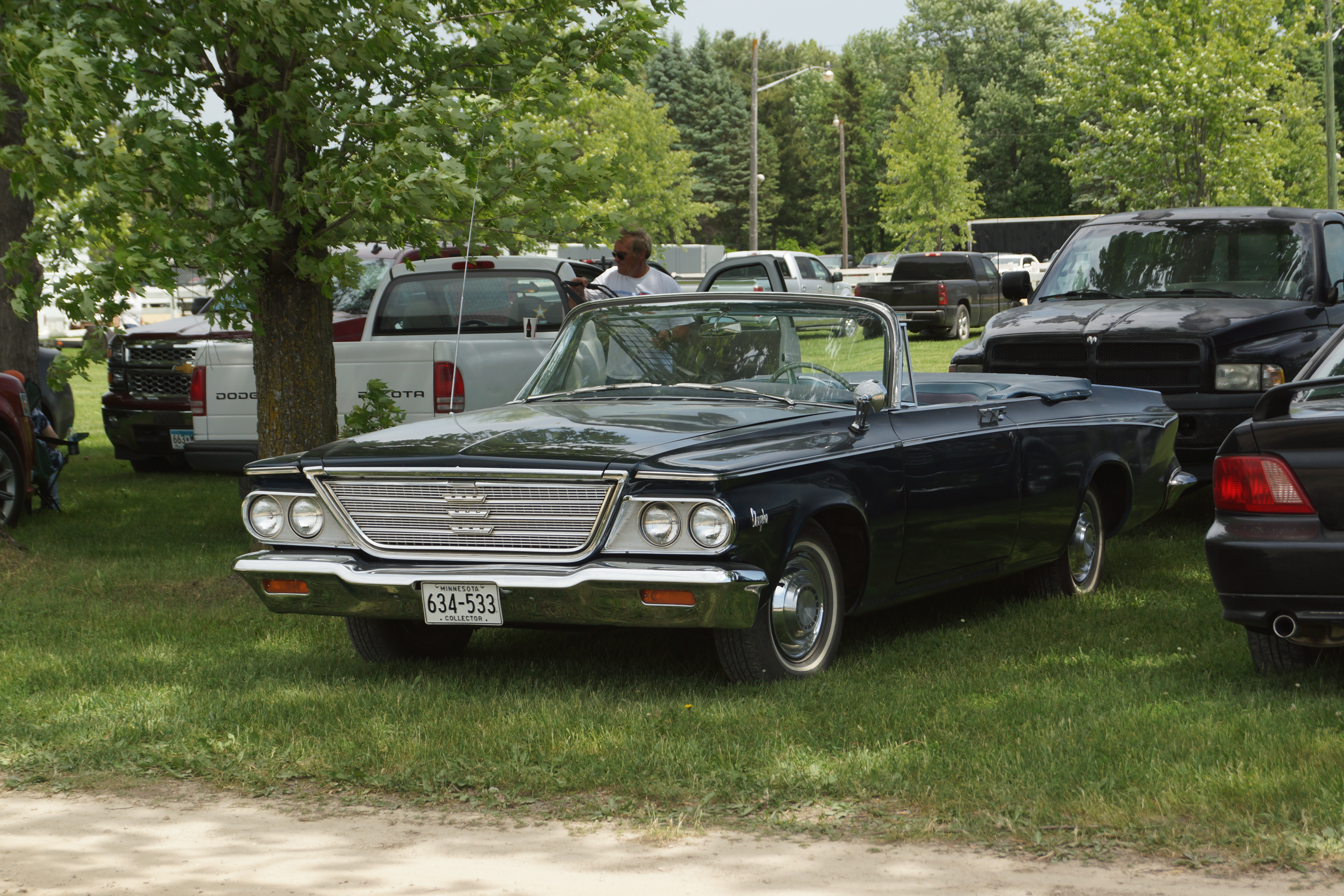
1964 Chrysler Newport Convertible

== 1965–1968 ==
Fourth generation
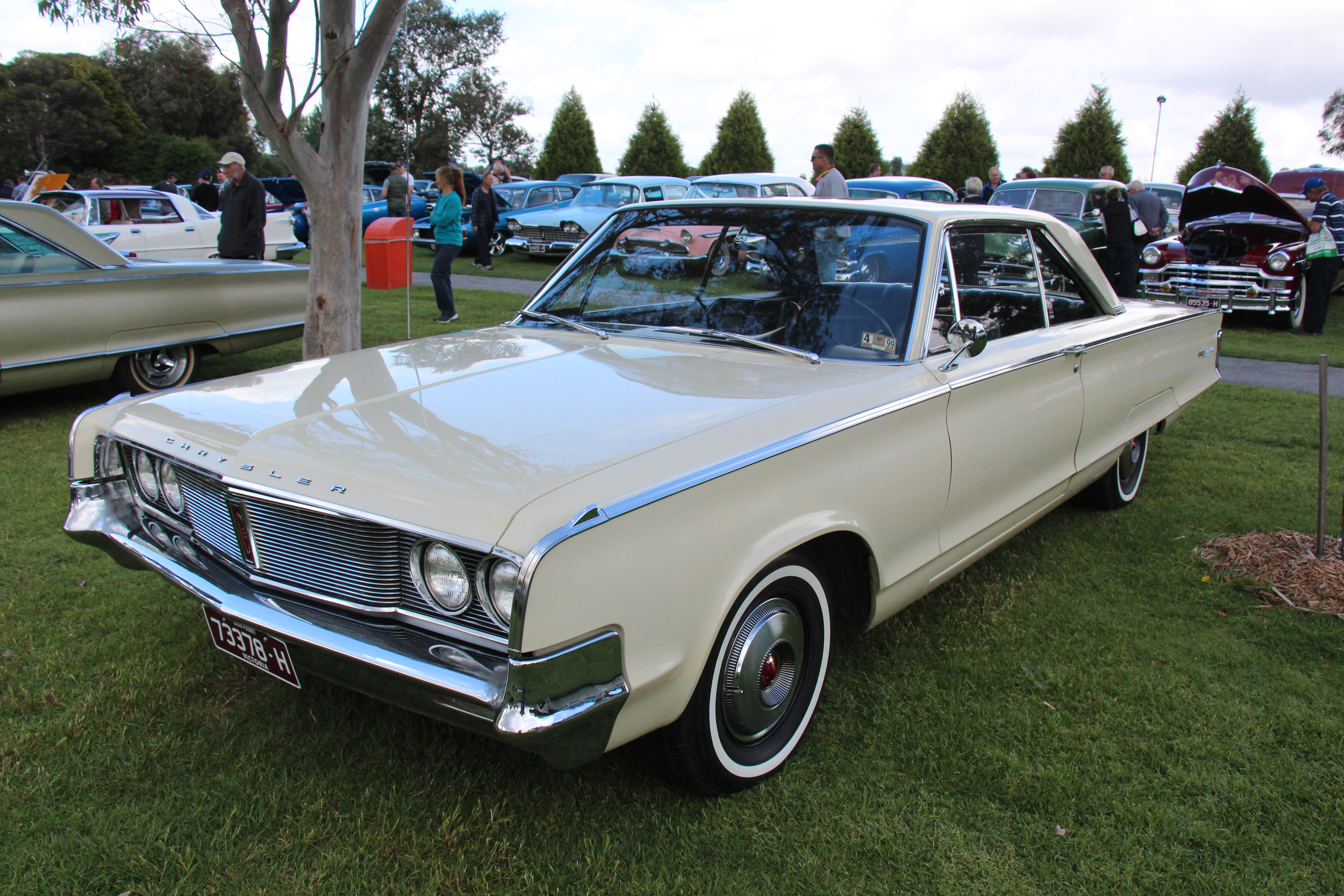
- 1965 Chrysler Newport 2-Door Hardtop

Overview
- Production: 1964–1968
- Model years: 1965–1968
- Assembly: Jefferson Avenue Assembly, Detroit, Michigan, United States; Belvidere Assembly Plant, Belvidere, Illinois

Body and chassis
- Body style: 2-door hardtop 2-door convertible 4-door hardtop 4-door sedan 4-door station wagon
- Platform: C-body
- Related: Chrysler New Yorker; Dodge Polara; Plymouth Fury; Dodge Monaco; Plymouth VIP; Chrysler 300; Chrysler Town and Country; Dodge Custom 880; Chrysler 300L

Powertrain
- Engine: 383 cu in (6.3 L) B-series V8; 440 cu in (7.2 L) RB-series V8
- Transmission: 3-speed automatic 3-speed manual

Dimensions
- Wheelbase: 124 in (3,150 mm)

The 1965 Newport was built on an all-new Chrysler C platform, shared with the 300 and New Yorker, along with the Dodge Polara and Plymouth Fury. Styling mimicked the square lines of the Lincoln Continental and the 1964 Imperial, while wheelbases increased 2 in (51 mm) to 124 in (3,150 mm) (wagons continued on the 122 in (3,099 mm) wheelbase). All body styles were continued from 1964 including the pillared four-door sedan, four-door hardtop sedan, two-door hardtop coupe, and convertible, along with the station wagon, which was renamed the Chrysler Town and Country and became a separate series. A new bodystyle for 1965 (shared with other Chryslers and Dodge Polaras) was a six-window Town Sedan that included a small side-window in the pillar similar to the three-window design of 1950s cars. This design would later return in the 1970s.

The standard engine for the 1965 Newport was the 383 cu in (6.3 L) V8 with two-barrel carburetor and 270 hp (201 kW), designed for use of regular gasoline of 92–94 Research octane. Optionally available at extra cost was the 383 with four-barrel carburetion and 315 hp (235 kW) with higher compression and required premium fuel of 98–100 octane rating. The standard transmission was a three-speed column shifted manual and optionally available was the three-speed Torqueflite automatic transmission, now featuring a column-mounted shifter replacing the pushbuttons of previous years as was changeover on all 1965 model year Chrysler Corporation cars and trucks.

Interiors featured padded instrument panels, full carpeting and choices of cloth-and-vinyl or all-vinyl bench seats and notchback bench seats with armrest. Newport coupes and convertibles were also offered with optional bucket seats with either a center console and floor shifter or armrest and center cushion.

The 1966 Newport received new grille work and revised taillights, but was otherwise changed very little from 1965. Engine offerings were revised with the 270 hp (201 kW) 383 cu in (6.3 L) two-barrel continuing as standard equipment while the four-barrel 383 received a 10 hp (7 kW) increase to 325 hp (242 kW). New this year was Chrysler's 440 cu in (7.2 L) V8 that was available in a high-output TNT version with four-barrel carburetor, dual exhausts, and dual-snorkel air cleaner. This version was rated at 365 hp (272 kW), about 15 hp (11 kW) more than the standard 440 four-barrel that was the base engine in the New Yorker and Imperial, and optional on the Chrysler 300 as well as Dodge Polaras and Monacos, and Plymouth Furys.

For 1967, the Newport and other Chryslers received new sheet metal, but retained the basic 1965 bodyshell. Two-door hardtops received a new angular semi-fastback roofline featuring reverse-slant side windows while the rooflines of four-door pillared and hardtop sedans, and station wagons were unchanged. The slow-selling six-window Town Sedan was dropped this year. Engines were unchanged except for the 440 cu in (7.2 L) TNT version was increased up to 375 hp (280 kW; 380 PS).

New to the Newport line for 1967 was a more luxurious Newport Custom series available in four-door pillared and hardtop sedans, along with the two-door hardtop.

The 1968 Newport received only a minor facelift from its 1967 counterpart including new grilles and taillights. All body styles were carried over on both the base Newport and Newport Custom lines. The standard 383 cu in (6.3 L) two-barrel V8 received a 20 hp (15 kW) increase to 290 hp (216 kW), while the four-barrel 383 cu in (6.3 L) rating went from 325 hp (242 kW) to 330 hp (246 kW), while the 440 cu in (7.2 L) TNT was unchanged at 375 hp (280 kW).

A mid-year offering on the Newport hardtop coupe and convertible was the Sportsgrain option similar to the simulated woodgrain exterior bodyside trim on the Town and Country station wagons of this period. The Sportsgrain Newport was intended to bring back the spirit of the late 1940s Town and Country convertibles but amounted to little more than a regular Newport as there were no other modifications and interior trims were the same as standard Newports. Production of the 1968 Sportsgrain Newports amounted to 965 hardtops and 175 convertibles. The Sportsgrain option returned for the redesigned 1969 Newport two-door hardtop and convertible; however, orders for the option were so low that Chrysler did not release their production totals.

Mercury tried a similar approach to the Sportsgrain Newport in 1968 by offering woodgrain "Yacht Deck Paneling" as an option on its Park Lane coupes and convertibles, which also did not experience significant consumer demand.

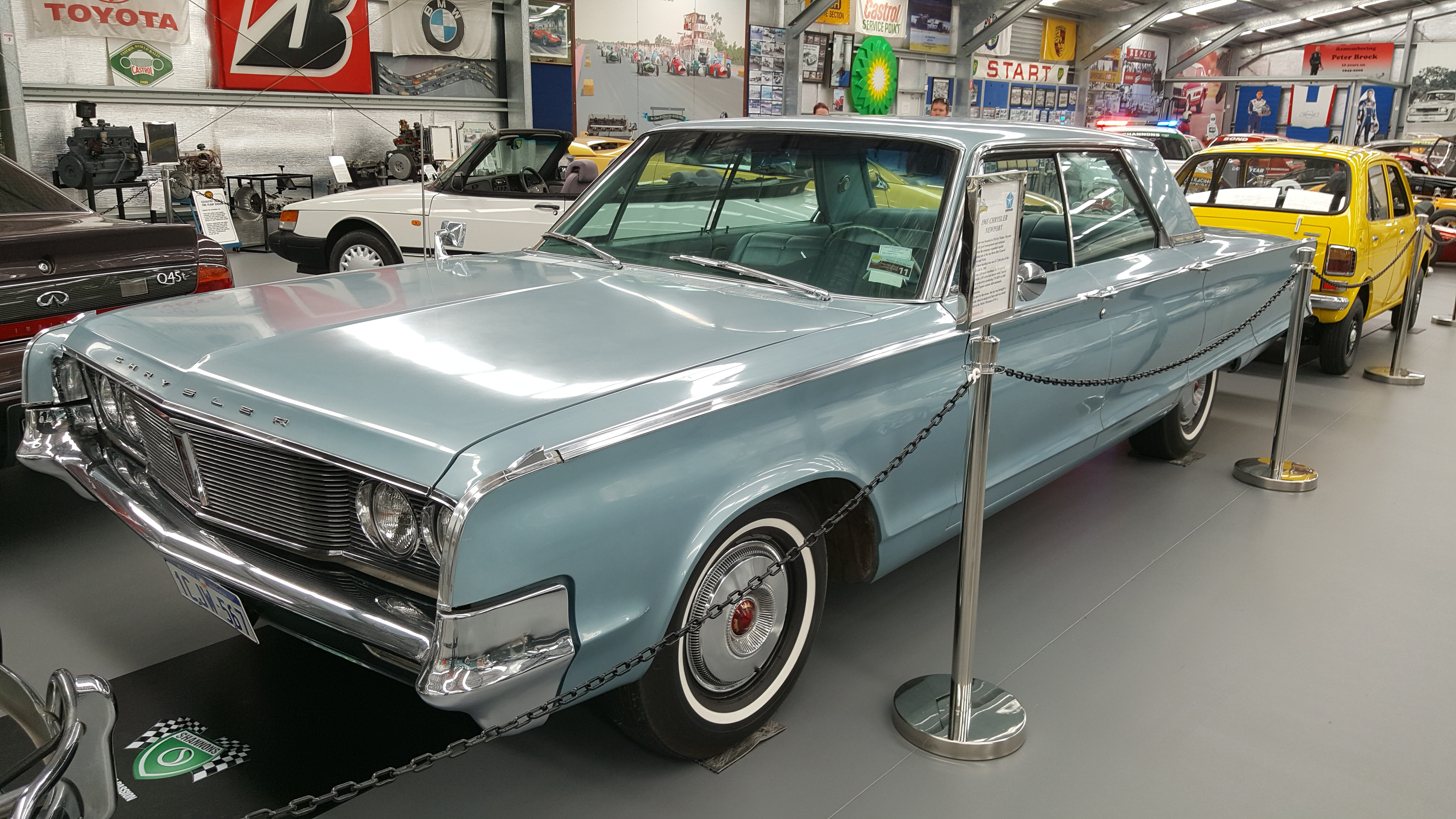
1965 Chrysler Newport 4-Door Hardtop

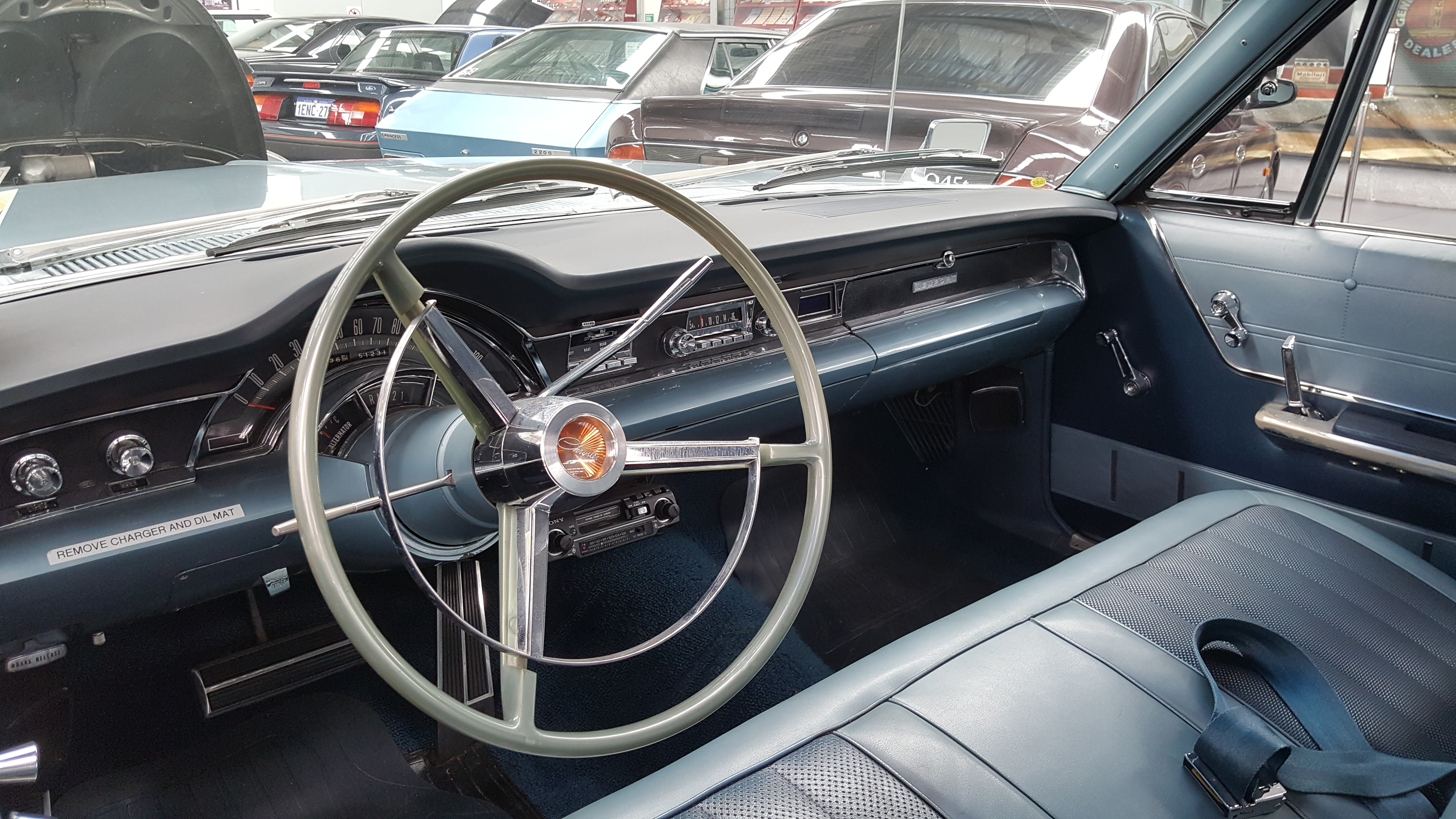
1965 Chrysler Newport interior

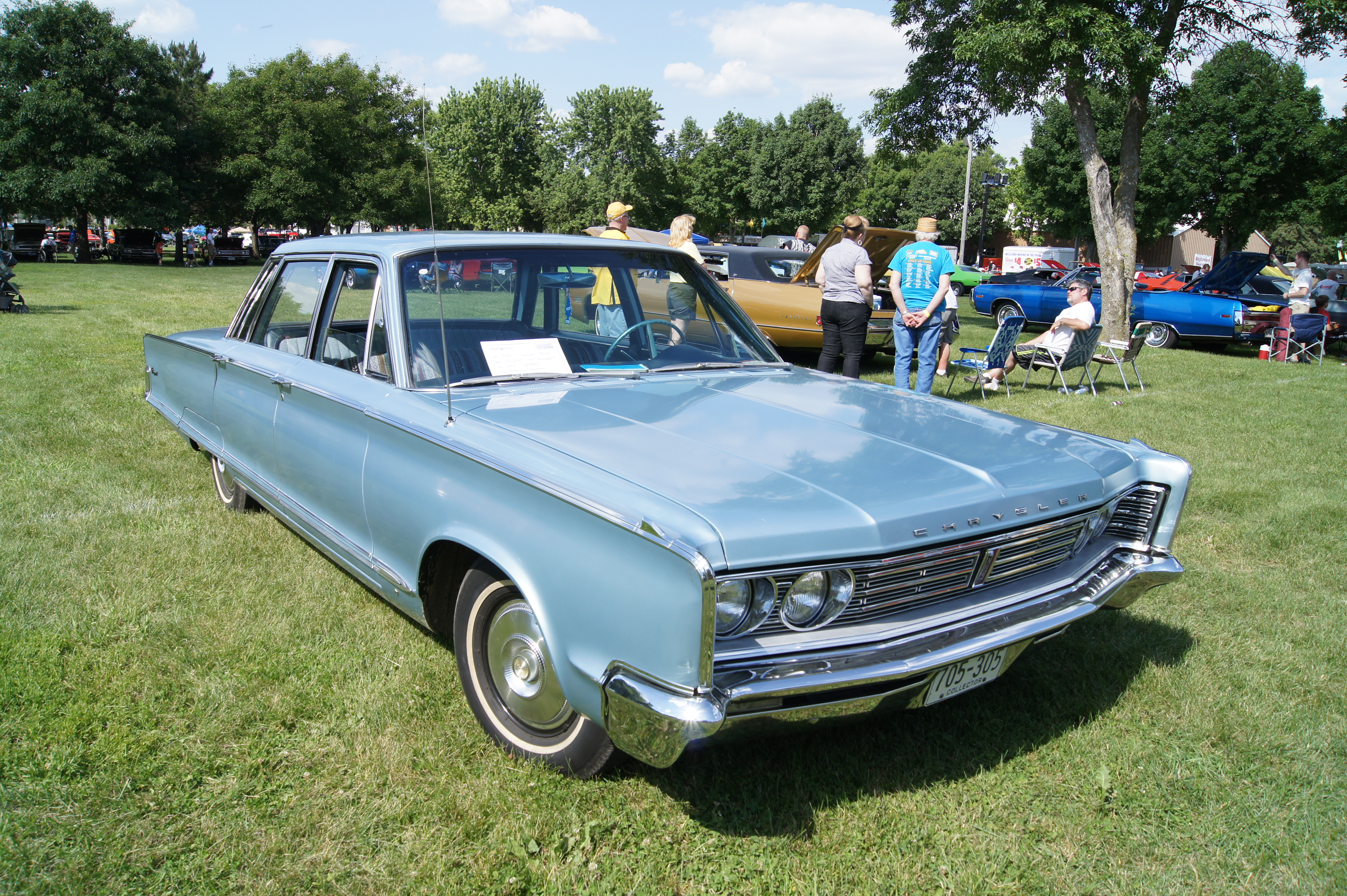
1966 Chrysler Newport 4-Door Sedan

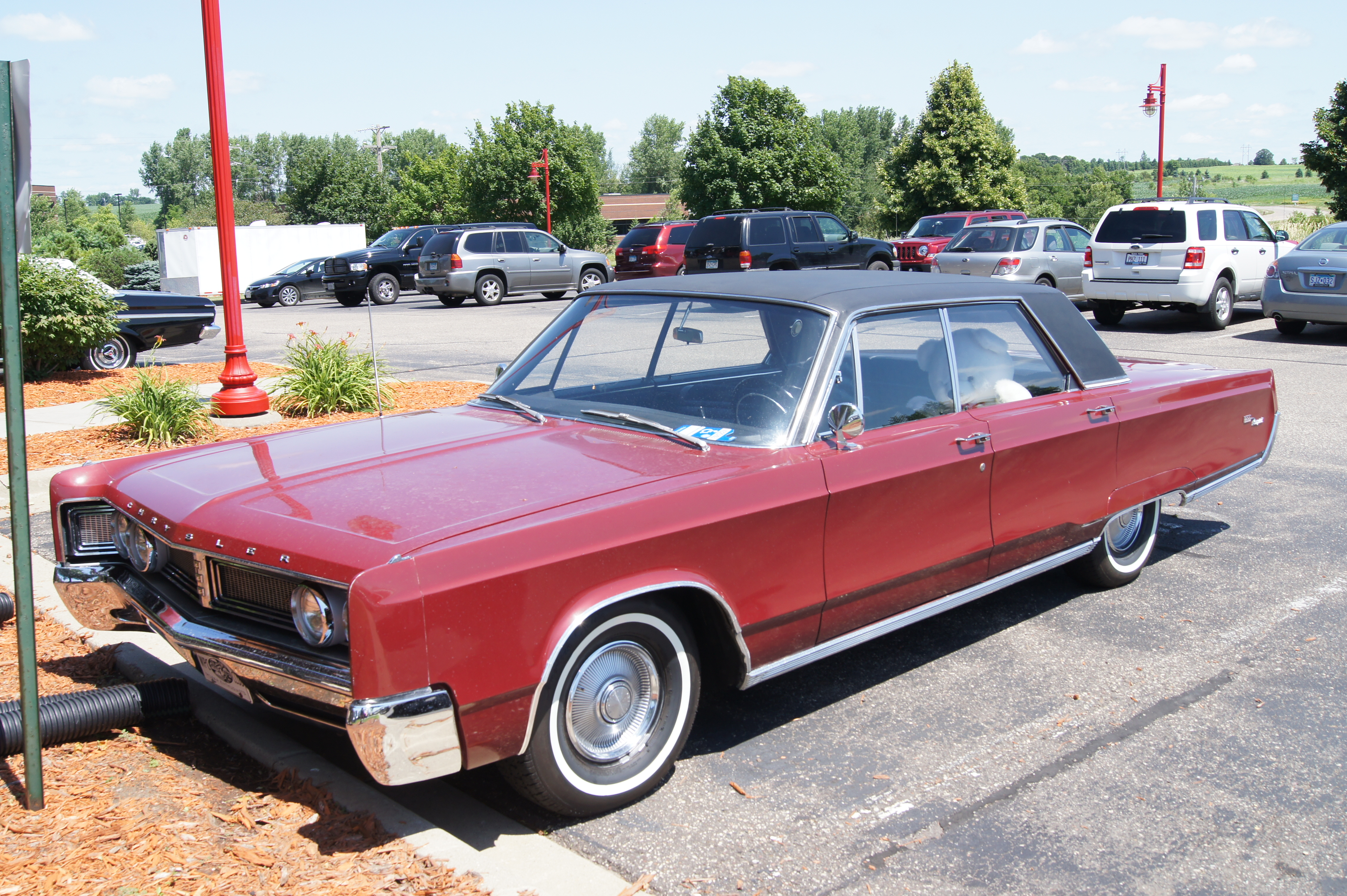
1967 Chrysler Newport 4-Door Hardtop

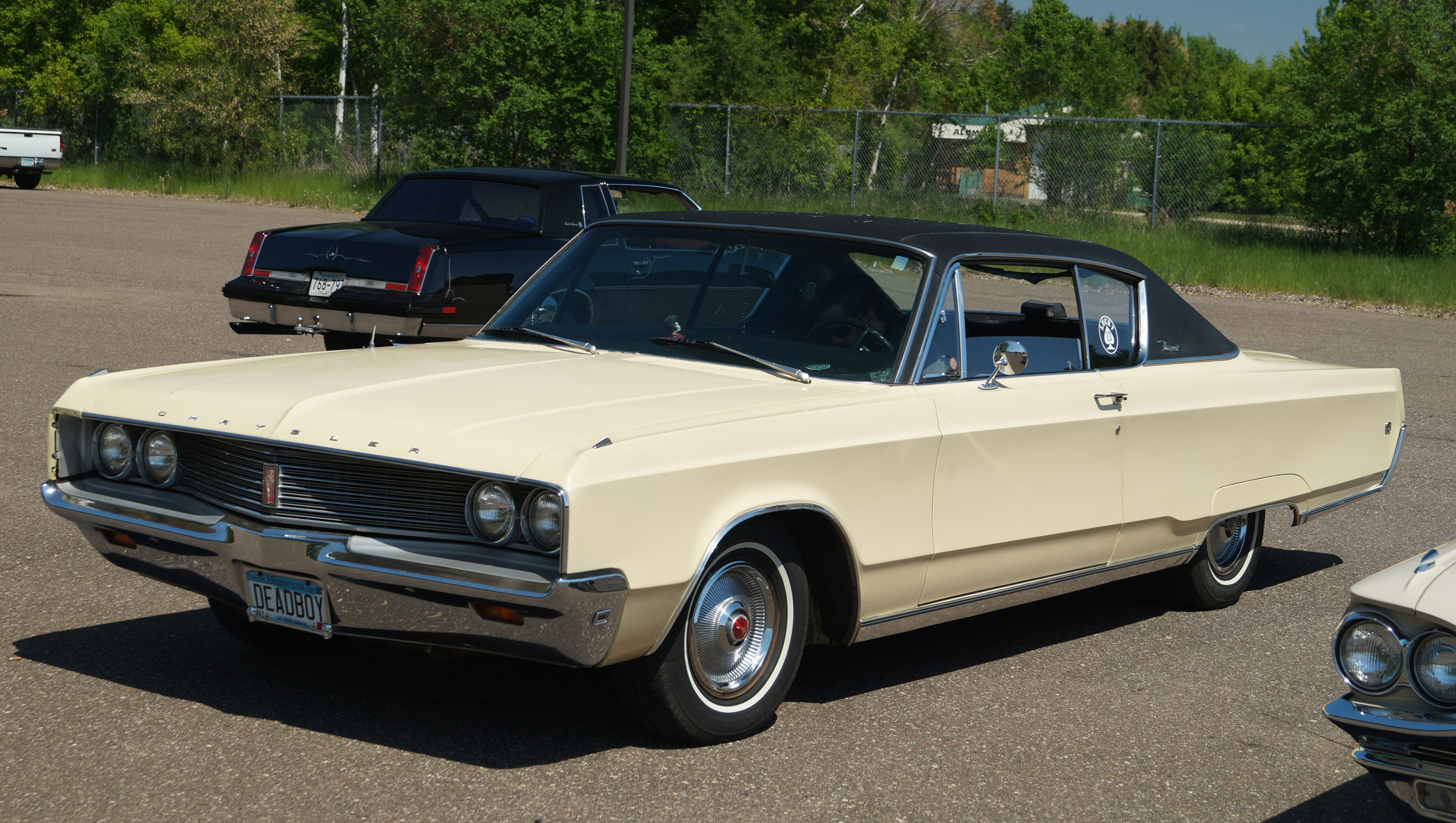
1968 Chrysler Newport 2-Door Hardtop

== 1969–1973 ==
Fifth generation
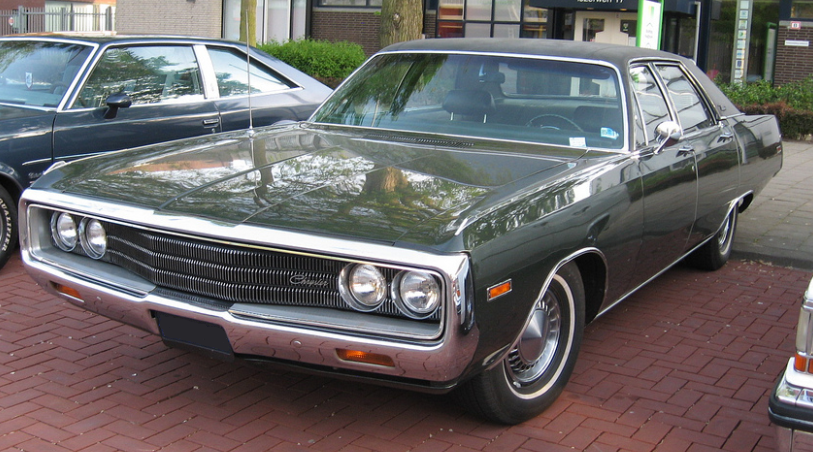
- 1970 Newport four-door sedan

Overview
- Production: 1968–1973
- Model years: 1969–1973
- Assembly: Jefferson Avenue Assembly, United States; Belvidere Assembly Plant, Belvidere, Illinois

Body and chassis
- Body style: 2-door hardtop 2-door convertible 4-door hardtop 4-door sedan
- Platform: C-body
- Related: Imperial Le Baron; Imperial Crown; Chrysler 300; Chrysler New Yorker; Chrysler Town and Country; Dodge Monaco; Dodge Polara; Plymouth Fury; Plymouth VIP

Powertrain
- Engine: 360 cu in (5.9 L) LA-Series V8; 383 cu in (6.3 L) B-series V8; 400 cu in (6.6 L) B-series V8; 440 cu in (7.2 L) RB-series V8

Dimensions
- Wheelbase: 124 in (3,150 mm)

The Newport was completely redesigned again for 1969, and featured the distinctive "Fuselage Styling" that would become symbolic of Chrysler's full-size cars until the end of the 1973 model year. Although retaining the same 124 in (3,150 mm) wheelbase that it shared with the premium New Yorker, this generation Newport was longer, lower, wider, and several hundred pounds heavier than the 1965–1968 Newports.

Although still offered in 2-door and 4-door hardtop, 2-door convertible, and 4-door sedan models, station wagons were no longer part of the Newport series, as the Town & Country became a separate model outright. Newport convertibles were discontinued after 1970, following a drop in sales of 48 percent that year, to 1,124 convertibles; while total Newport sales were down almost 30 percent, to 110,292 units, despite the restyling.

Available in 2- and 4-door hardtops and 4-door sedans, the Newport Custom would still be offered as the top-line Newport through the entire 1969–1973 design cycle. First appearing in 1971, the Newport Royal was an entry-level model in the Newport Series. It borrowed the name of the entry-level Chrysler from 1937–50. The Newport Royal name was discontinued for the 1973 model year and the Newport became the base model Chrysler. For 1970 a special appearance trim package was introduced on the 2- and 4-door hardtop called the Newport Cordoba.

For the 1971 model year, the Royal came standard with the 255 hp (190 kW) 360 cu in (5.9 L) V8, with optional 275 hp (205 kW) or 300 hp (224 kW) 383 cu in (6.3 L) engines, but not the 440 cu in (7.2 L); the Custom was standard with the 275 hp (205 kW) 383 cu in (6.3 L) V8, and the 300 hp (224 kW), 383 cu in (6.3 L) or 335 hp (250 kW), 440 cu in (7.2 L) V8s as options. For 1972, the Royal came standard with the 190 hp (142 kW), 400 cu in (6.6 L) V8 with the more powerful engines not available, while the Custom was standard with the 190 hp (142 kW) 400 cu in (6.6 L) V8, and the 225 hp (168 kW) single- and 245 hp (183 kW) dual-exhaust 440 cu in (7.2 L) V8s were optional. Power output would steadily decrease on all engines during this generation due to stricter emissions standards and rising fuel prices.

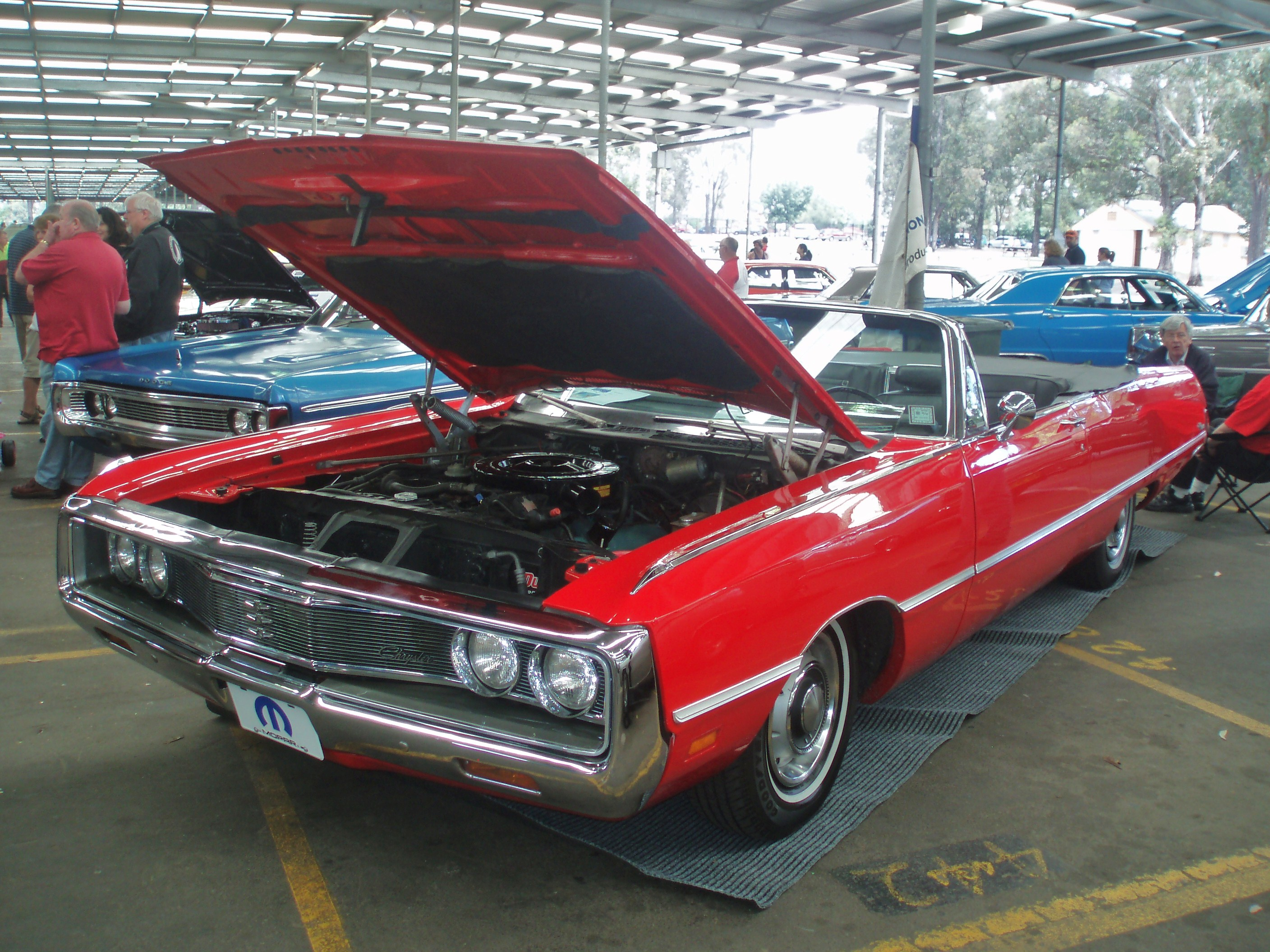
1969 Chrysler Newport Convertible

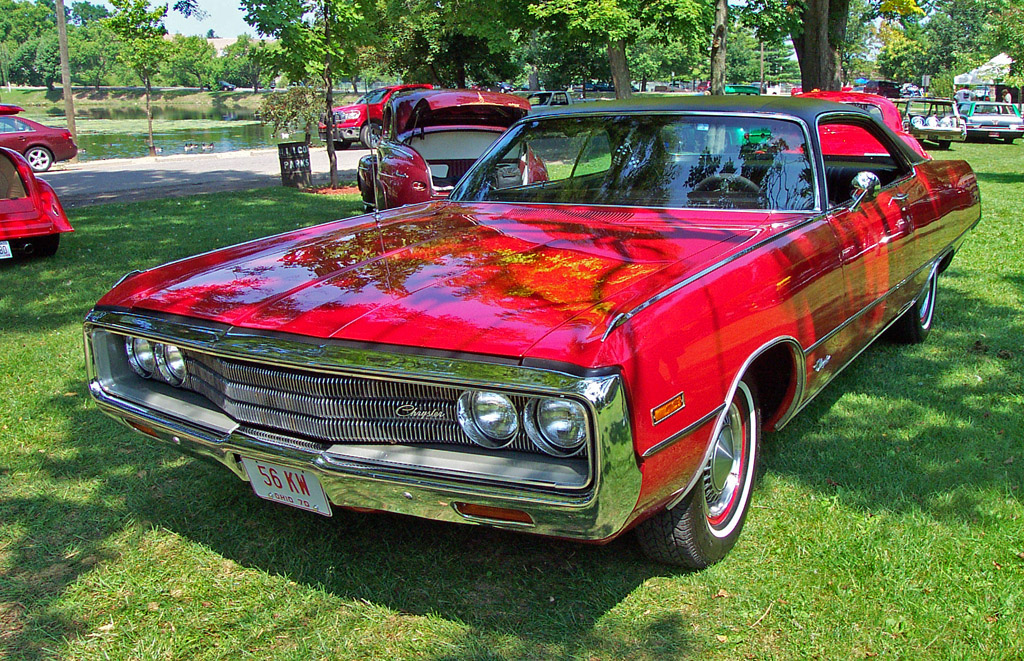
1970 Chrysler Newport 2-Door Hardtop

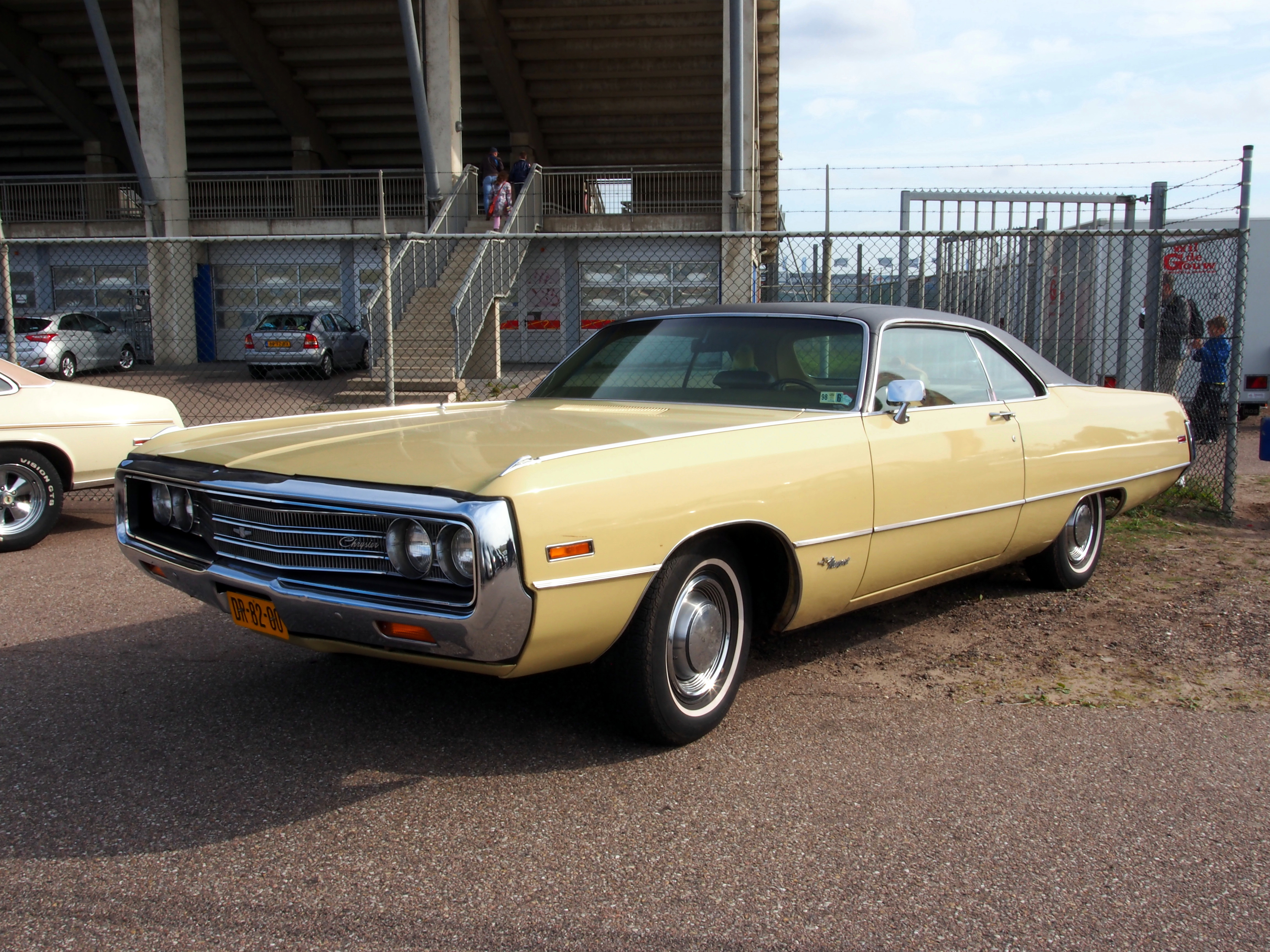
1971 Chrysler Newport 2-Door Hardtop

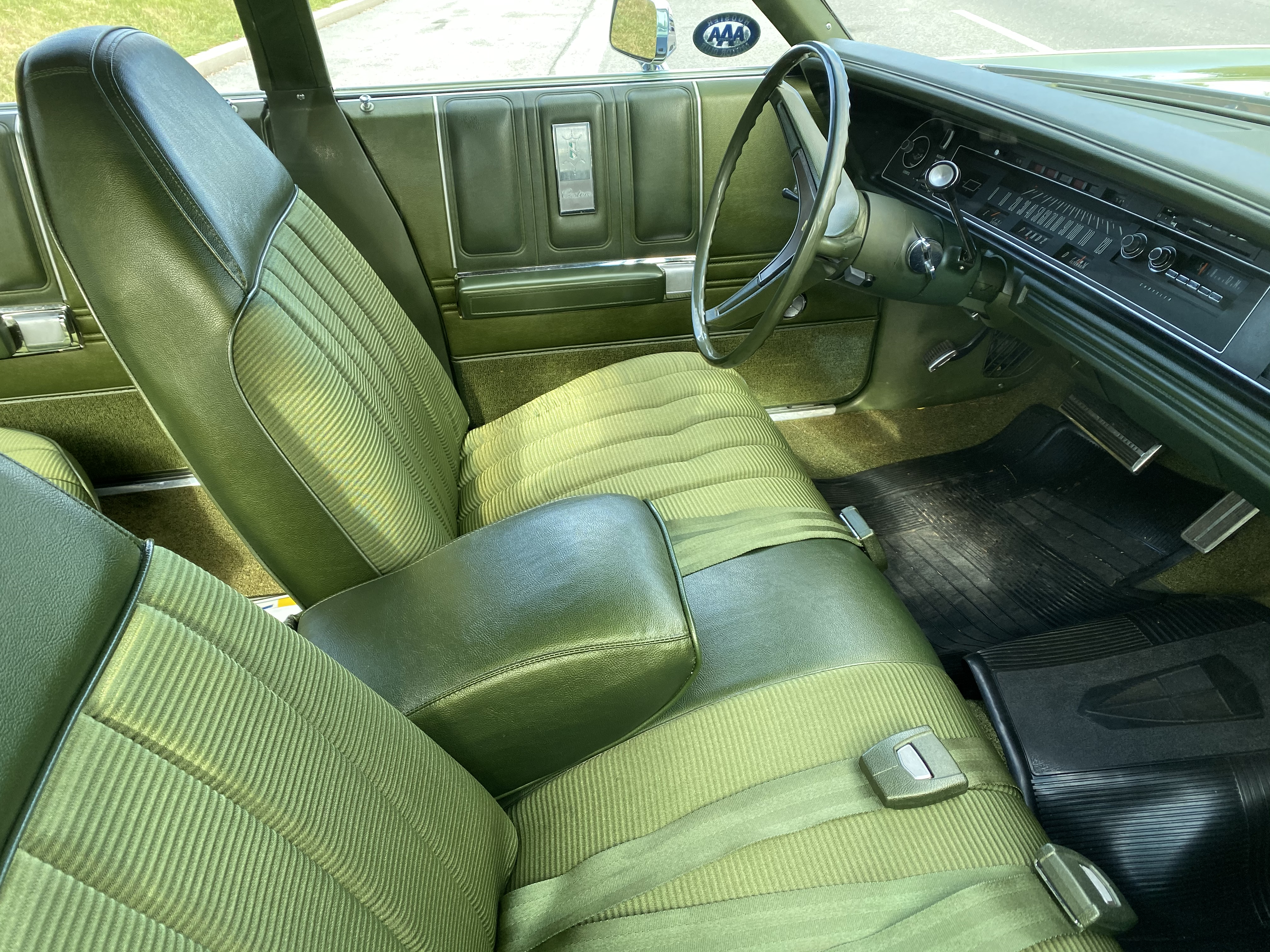
1971 Chrysler Newport interior

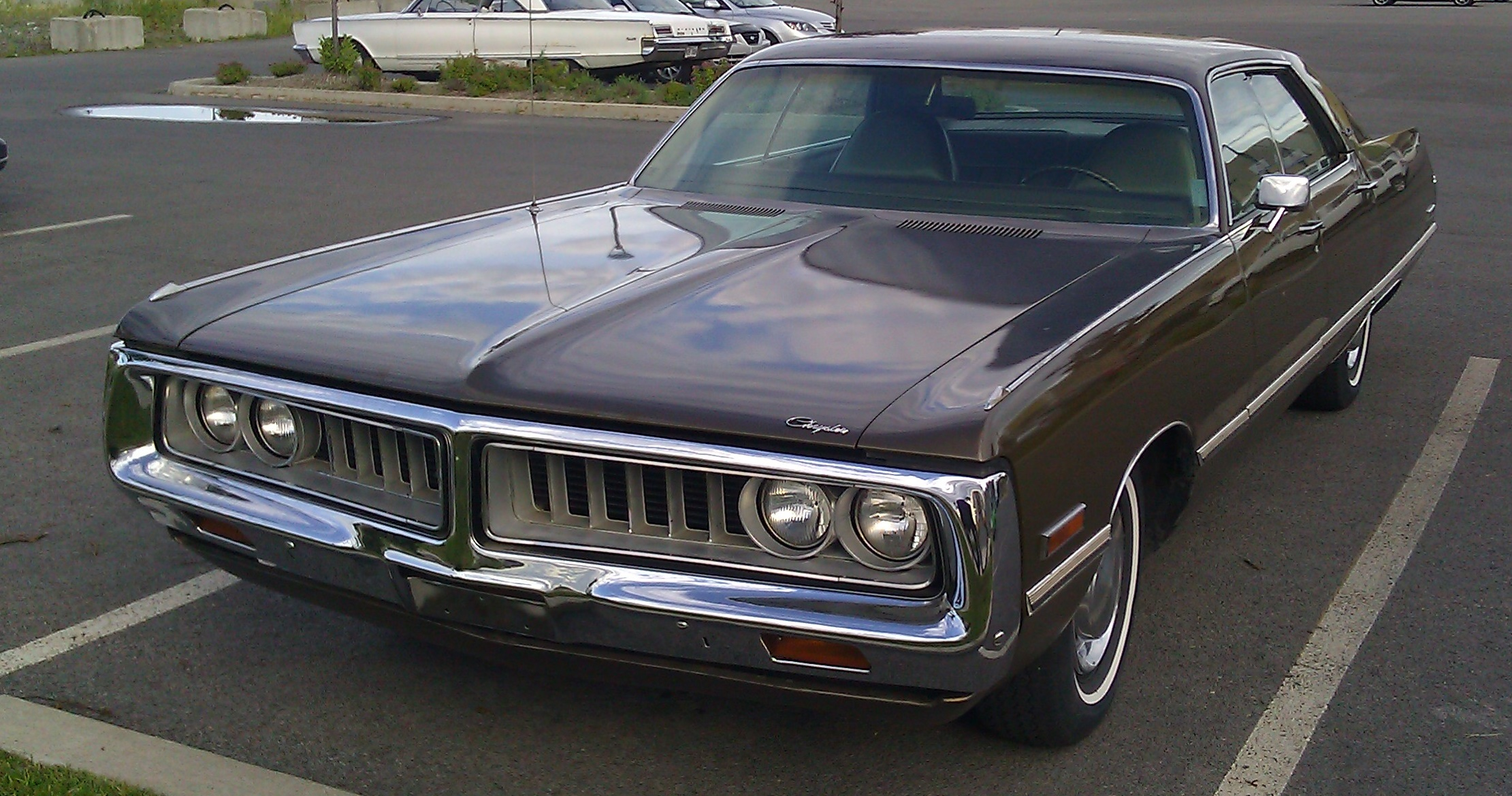
1972 Chrysler Newport Custom four-door hardtop

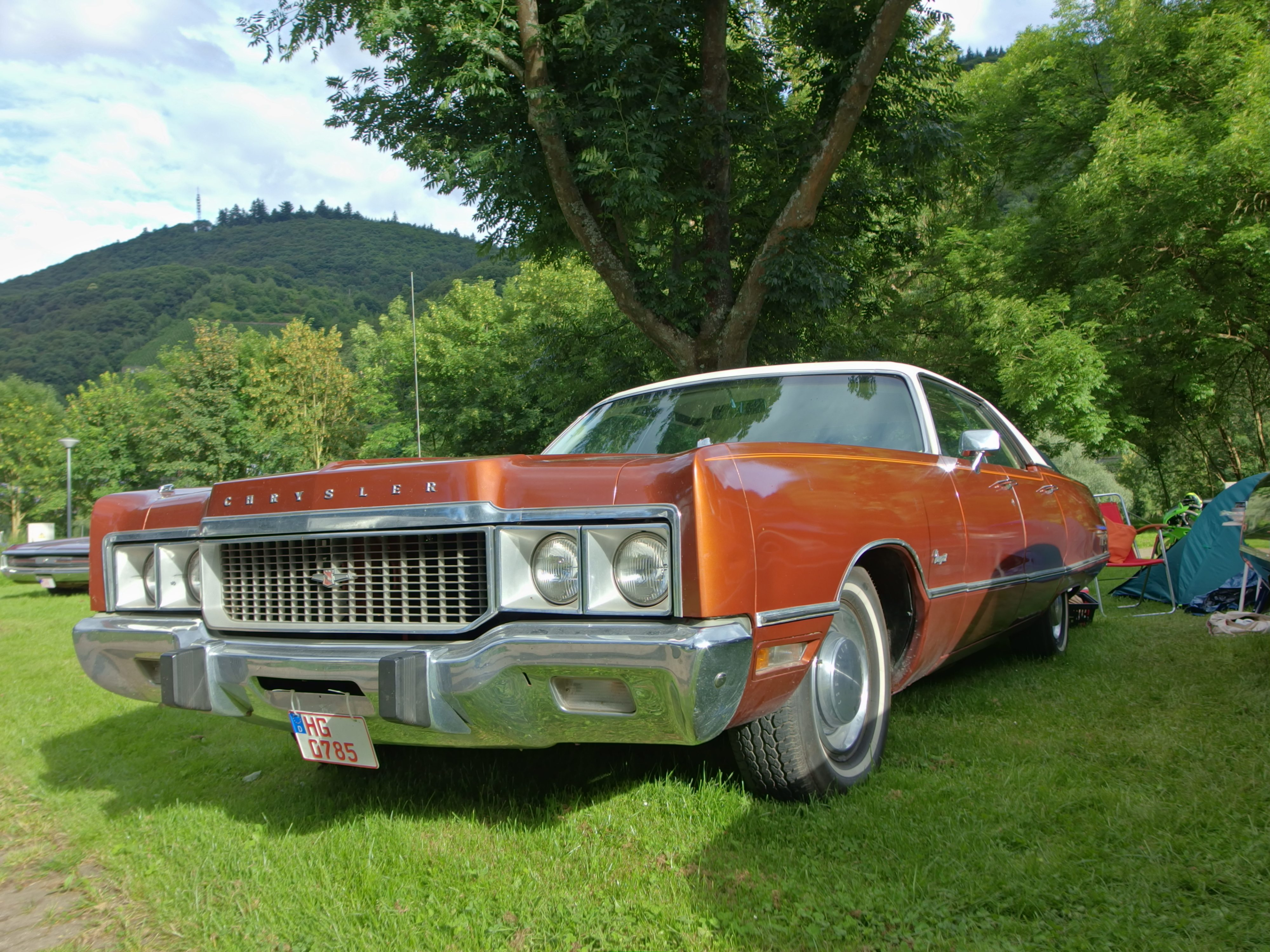
1973 Chrysler Newport 4-Door Hardtop

== 1974–1978 ==
Sixth generation
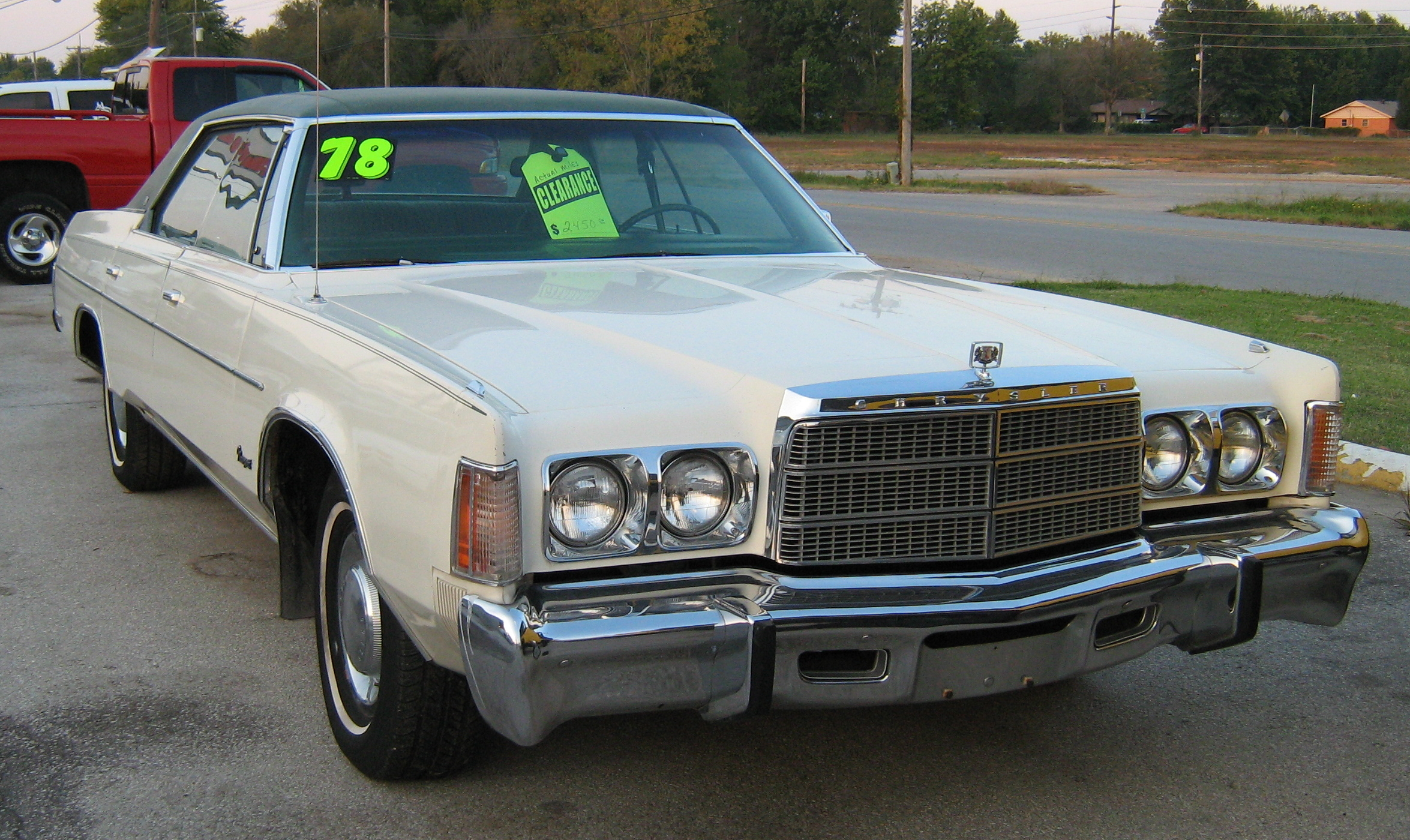
- 1978 Chrysler Newport 4-door hardtop

Overview
- Production: 1973–1978
- Model years: 1974–1978
- Assembly: Jefferson Avenue Assembly, United States; Belvidere Assembly Plant, Belvidere, Illinois

Body and chassis
- Body style: 2-door hardtop 4-door hardtop 4-door sedan
- Platform: C-body
- Related: Chrysler New Yorker; Chrysler Town and Country; Dodge Monaco; Plymouth Fury; Plymouth Gran Fury

Powertrain
- Engine: 360 cu in (5.9 L) LA-series V8; 400 cu in (6.6 L) B-series V8; 440 cu in (7.2 L) RB-series V8

Dimensions
- Wheelbase: 124 in (3,150 mm)

The Newport was redesigned for the 1974 model year, along with all other full-size C-body cars. This generation shed the sweeping "fuselage" styling, in favor of more crisper, slab-sided styling. Despite losing several inches in length, 1974–1978 Newports were some of the heaviest cars ever produced by Chrysler. Their introduction coincided with the 1973 OPEC oil embargo, and sales of all full-size cars plummeted. The Chrysler Corporation was especially hit hard, as no smaller cars were sold under the Chrysler brand.

A design change was made in 1976 to the rear of the Newport Custom series. The former vertical style tail lights (which were retained by the standard Newport) were replaced by a set that stretched out horizontally across the back of the car. The license plate was moved to the bumper but the fuel cap remained in the same place. However a new fuel door sat between the new tail lights, previous models had the fuel cap behind the license plate. The 1976 Newport Custom rear styling was inherited from the 1974 and '75 Chrysler New Yorker, while the New Yorker itself inherited the discontinued Imperial's front and rear styling for 1976. The Newport Custom was subsequently discontinued at the end of the 1976 model year, and the 1977 and '78 Newports received the horizontal taillight treatment.

Production of the C-body Newport ended in 1978, along with the Chrysler New Yorker. Related Dodge and Plymouth C-body cars, as well as C-body Chrysler Town & Country station wagons had all been dropped the previous year. The 1978 Newport and New Yorker offered the American car industry's last true two-door and four-door hardtops; all four-doors and Newport coupes were hardtops, the pillared sedan also having been dropped.

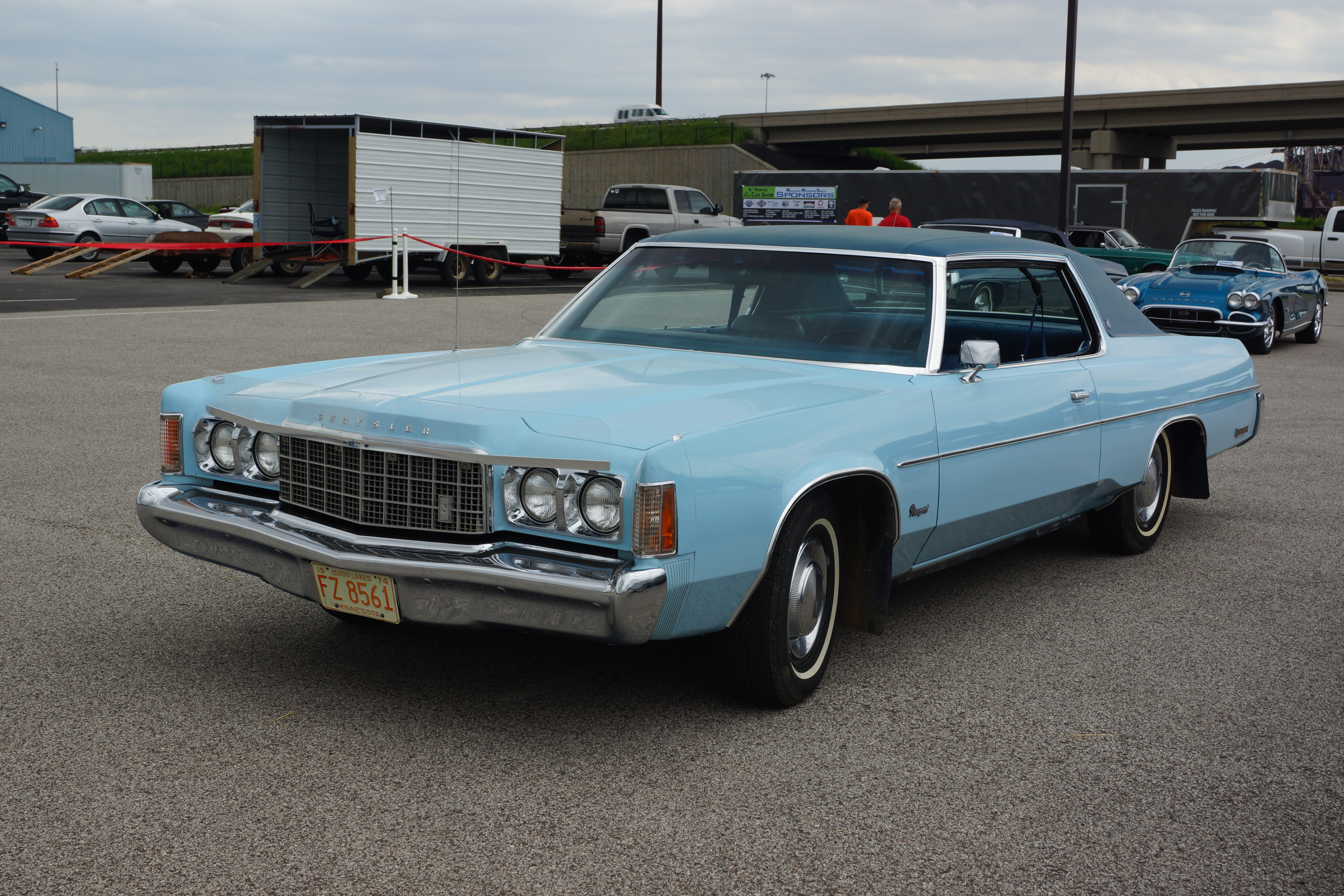
1974 Chrysler Newport Custom 2-door hardtop

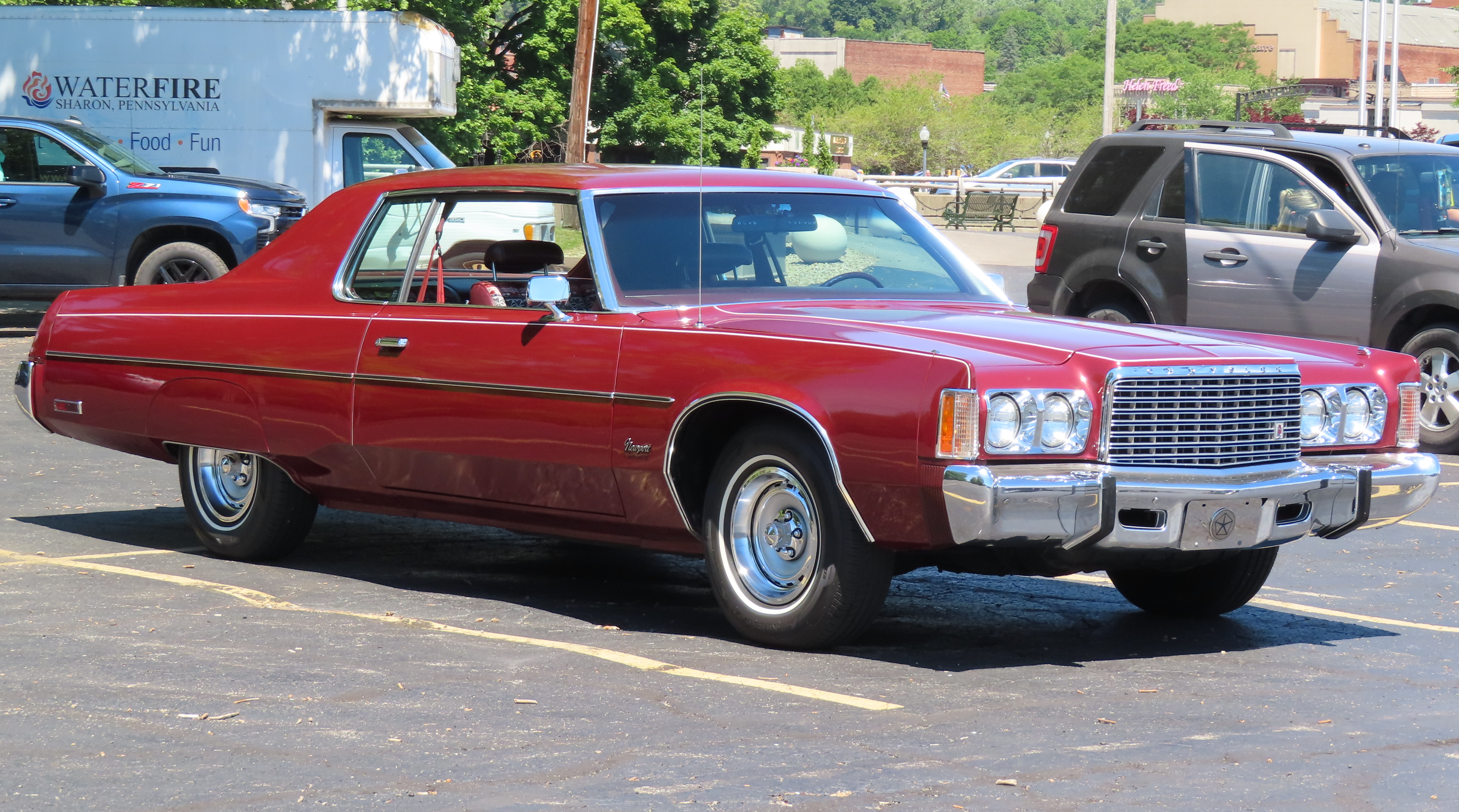
1975 Chrysler Newport 2-door hardtop

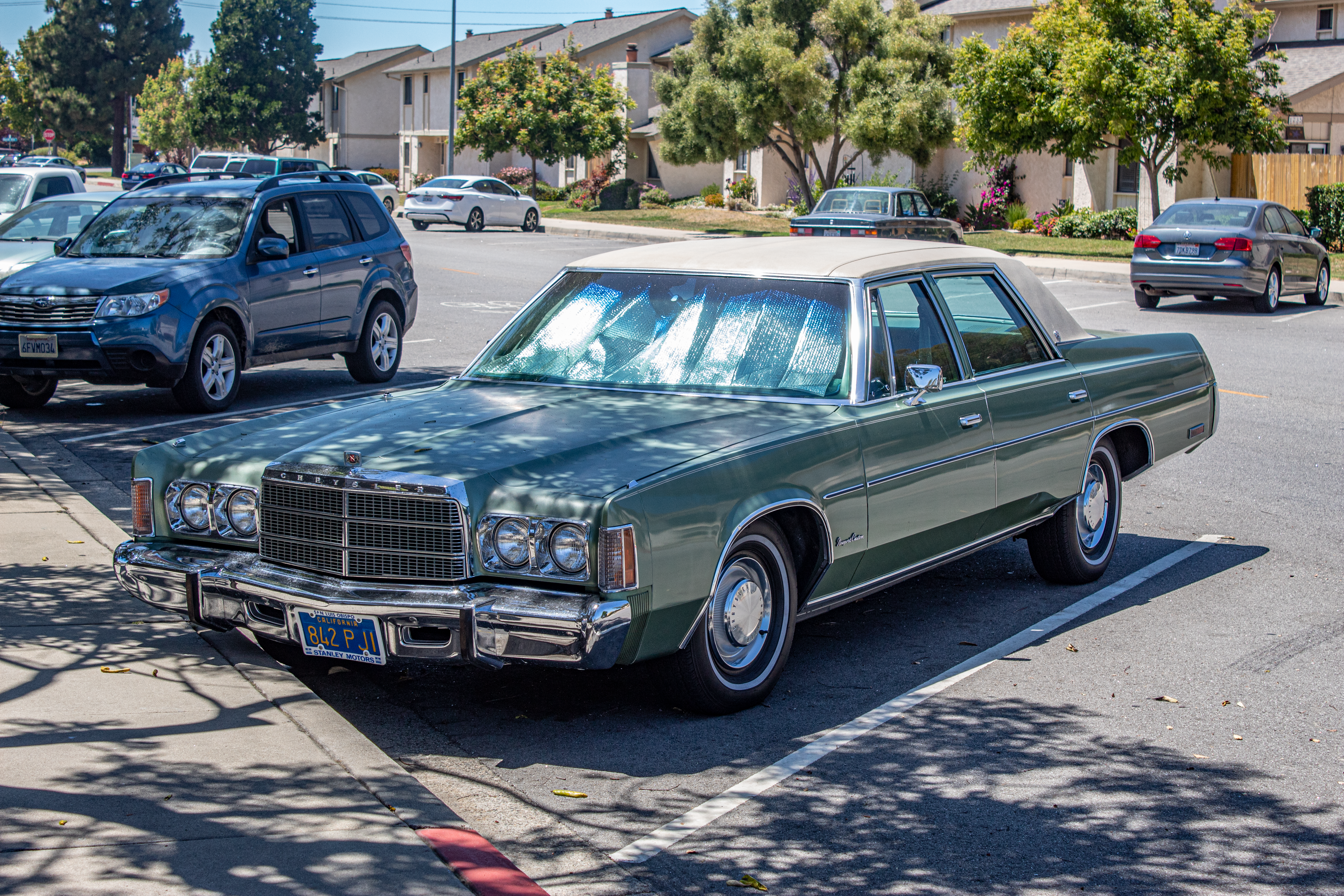
1976 Chrysler Newport Custom 4-door sedan

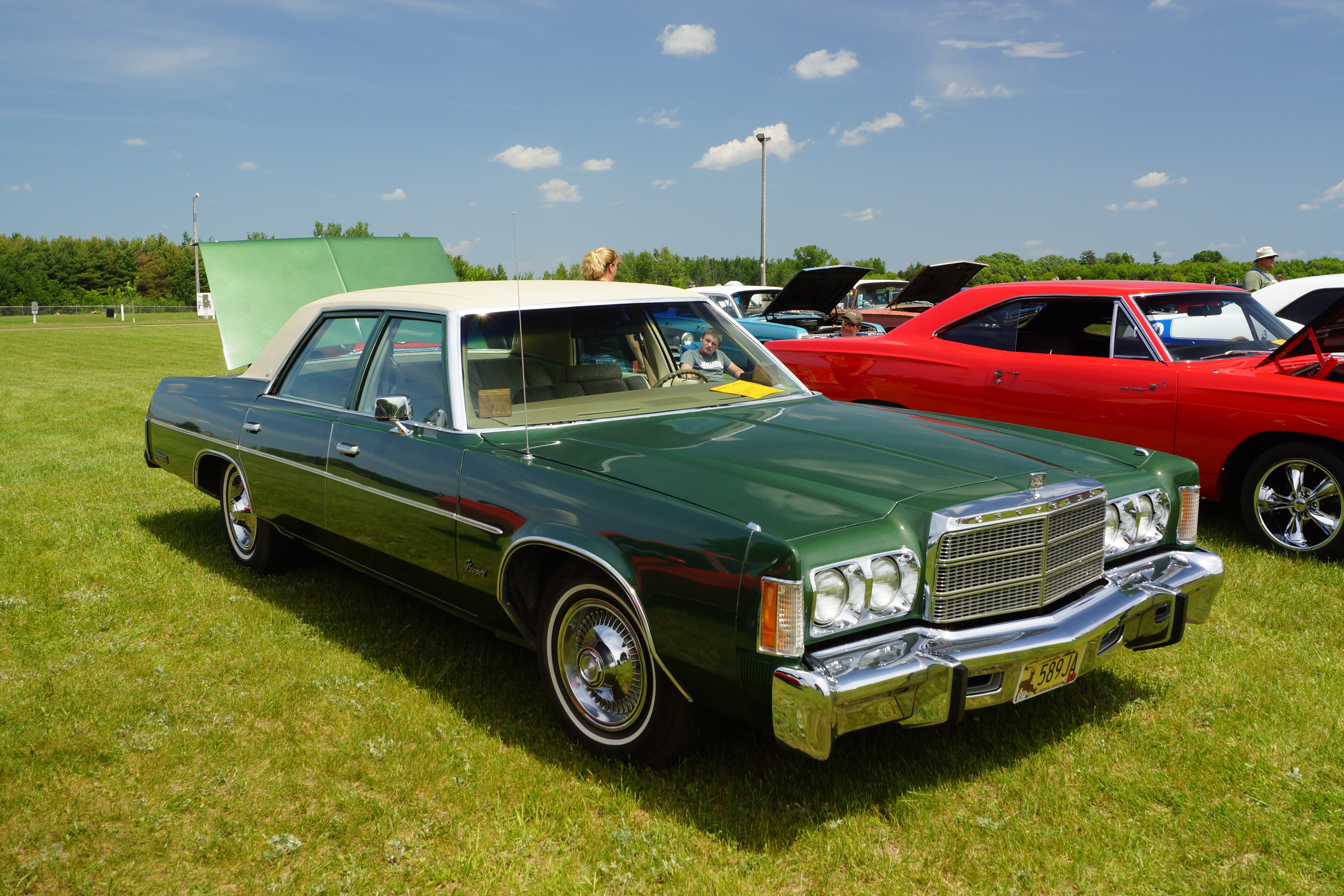
1977 Chrysler Newport 4-door sedan

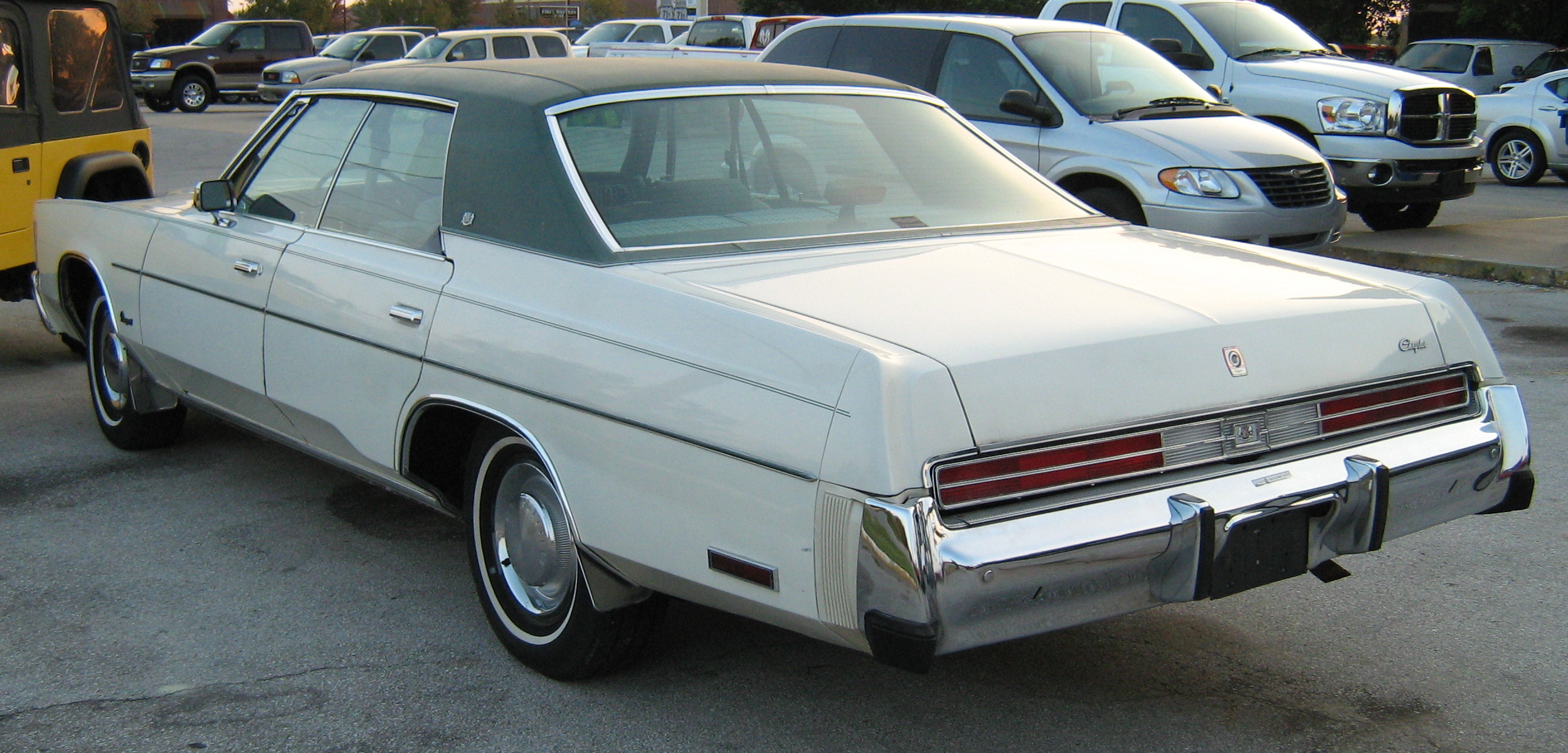
1978 Chrysler Newport 4-door hardtop

== 1979–1981 ==
Seventh generation
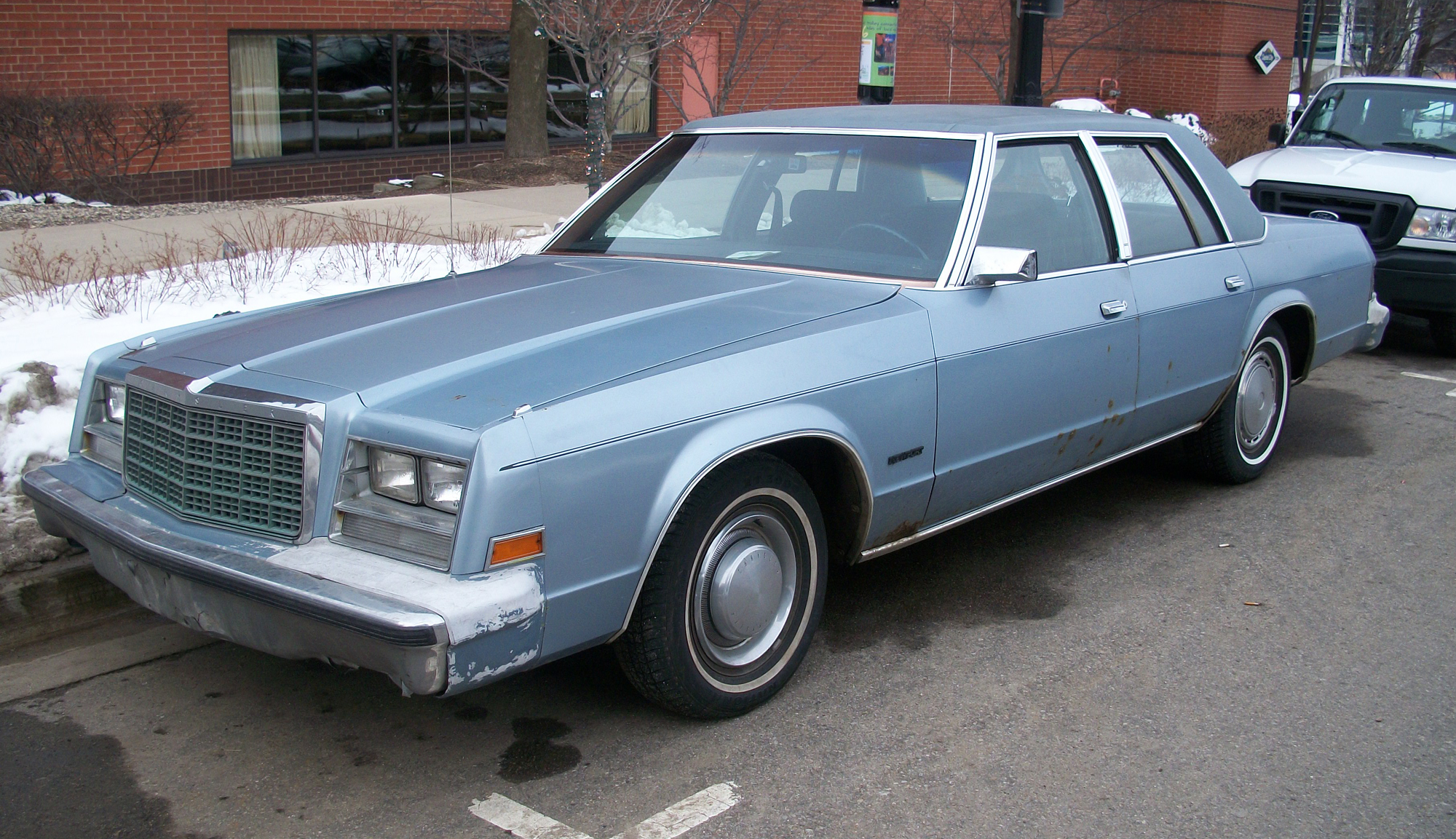

Overview
- Production: 1978–1981
- Model years: 1979–1981
- Assembly: Detroit, Michigan (Lynch Road), United States; Windsor, Ontario, Canada (1979 only)

Body and chassis
- Body style: 4-door sedan
- Platform: R-body
- Related: Chrysler Fifth Avenue; Chrysler New Yorker; Dodge St. Regis; Plymouth Gran Fury

Powertrain
- Engine: 225 cu in (3.7 L) Chrysler Slant-6 engine 318 cu in (5.2 L) Chrysler LA V8 engine 360 cu in (5.9 L) Chrysler LA V8 engine

The 1979 model year saw a new downsized Newport on the Chrysler R platform, a derivative of the circa 1962 Chrysler B platform. This reduced model availability to a single "pillared hardtop" 4-door sedan. While GM and Ford had downsized their big cars by engineering smaller bodies around more spacious passenger accommodations, Chrysler took a different approach. The existing Chrysler B platform was modified to improve fuel efficiency through a number of weight saving measures. Examples include plastic brake wheel cylinder pistons, which tended to swell and bind up the brakes after some years in service. Chrome-plated aluminum bumpers were another innovation, but were replaced in 1980 with a stronger steel rear bumper. The large displacement V8 engines were dropped.

1979 Chrysler Newport police package

Initial 1979 sales were strong (with a large portion of Newport sales going for fleet use), but Chrysler's unsteady financial condition, combined with the 1980 addition of the Plymouth Gran Fury, tightening oil and gasoline supplies hurt sales of the redesigned vehicle, and all of the R-body models were discontinued after a short run of 1981 models, as Chrysler began its shift toward smaller front-wheel drive cars. During this time the Early 1980s recession in the United States began to take effect and impact sales.

Production Figures
Year	Units
1979	60,904
1980	9,001
1981	5,497
Total Production = 75,402

== Cancelled revival, 1984 ==
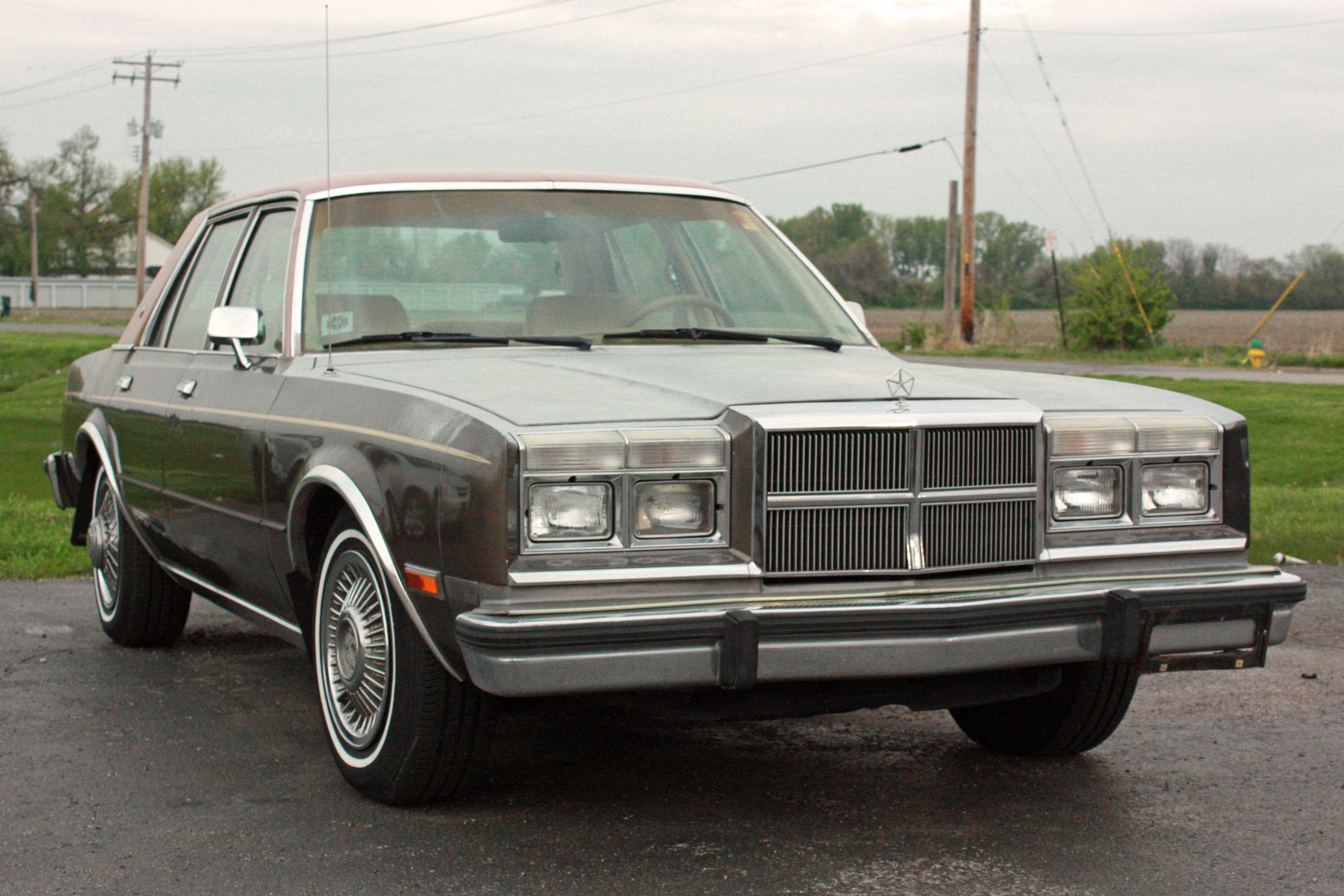
The modified Chrysler grille on the Dodge Diplomat SE

The Newport model name nearly made a comeback in early 1984 as a more affordable version of the Fifth Avenue, but at the last minute, the would-be Newport was marketed as the Dodge Diplomat SE, a premium version of that line. This model used the same waterfall grille as the Fifth Avenue with the exception of a horizontal bar running across the center to mimic the other "crosshair" grilles in the Dodge lineup.
