= Chrysler Town & Country (1941–1988) =

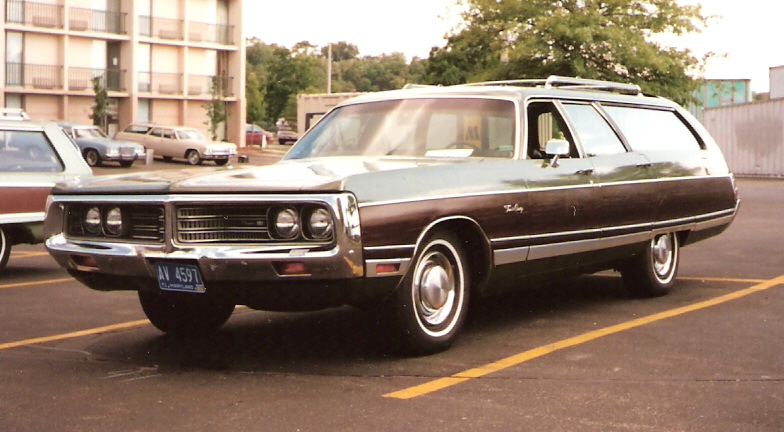
- 1972 Chrysler Town & Country 4-door wagon

Overview
- Manufacturer: Chrysler
- Production: 1940–1941; 1945–1988
- Model years: 1941–1942; 1946–1988
- Assembly: Jefferson Avenue Assembly; Detroit, Michigan, United States

Body and chassis
- Class: Full-size luxury car (1941–1942) (1946–1977); Mid-size luxury car (1978–1988)

Chronology
- Successor: Chrysler Town & Country minivan (1990–2016)

The Chrysler Town & Country is an automobile manufactured by Chrysler from 1940 to 1942 and from 1945 to 1988, with production interrupted during World War II. Primarily produced as a luxury station wagon, the Town & Country was also available in "woodie" four-door sedan, two-door hardtop and convertible body styles from 1947 to 1950, 1968 to 1969, and 1983 to 1986. The 1988 model year was the last for the station wagon until the 1990 model year, when Chrysler reintroduced the Town & Country nameplate as the rebadged Town & Country minivan.

The Town & Country wagon was reintroduced with all-steel construction in 1951, in both Windsor and New Yorker variants until the end of Windsor model production for the 1960 model year, and then in Newport and New Yorker models through 1965. In 1966, it became a standalone model, with trim and features that bridged the gap between the two sedan lines. It was distinguished by luxury features including a carpeted rear cargo area with split-folding second row bench seats trimmed with chrome covered strips of steel, and from 1968 forward, simulated woodgrain paneling on the body sides and tailgate, a feature also associated with somewhat competitive top-shelf station wagons such as the AMC Ambassador, Buick Estate, Oldsmobile Custom Cruiser, Ford Country Squire and the Mercury Colony Park. In 1976, AMC introduced the Jeep Grand Wagoneer, with similar passenger accommodation and a simulated woodgrain appearance built on a dedicated chassis. The Town & Country, however, stood in a luxury class by itself until the last of the full-sized versions of 1977. In 1978, it was sized down and absorbed into the LeBaron series, with a lesser version lacking the more luxurious features and the woodgrain bodyside decals available for a few years in the early 1980s.

Chrysler reintroduced the Town & Country nameplate in 1989 as a luxury rebadged variant of the Dodge Grand Caravan/Plymouth Grand Voyager minivan for the 1990 model year. This incarnation of the Town & Country would continue to be sold until the end of the 2016 model year, when Chrysler reintroduced the Pacifica nameplate for their minivan for the 2017 model year.

== 1941–1942 ==
Series C-28/C-30
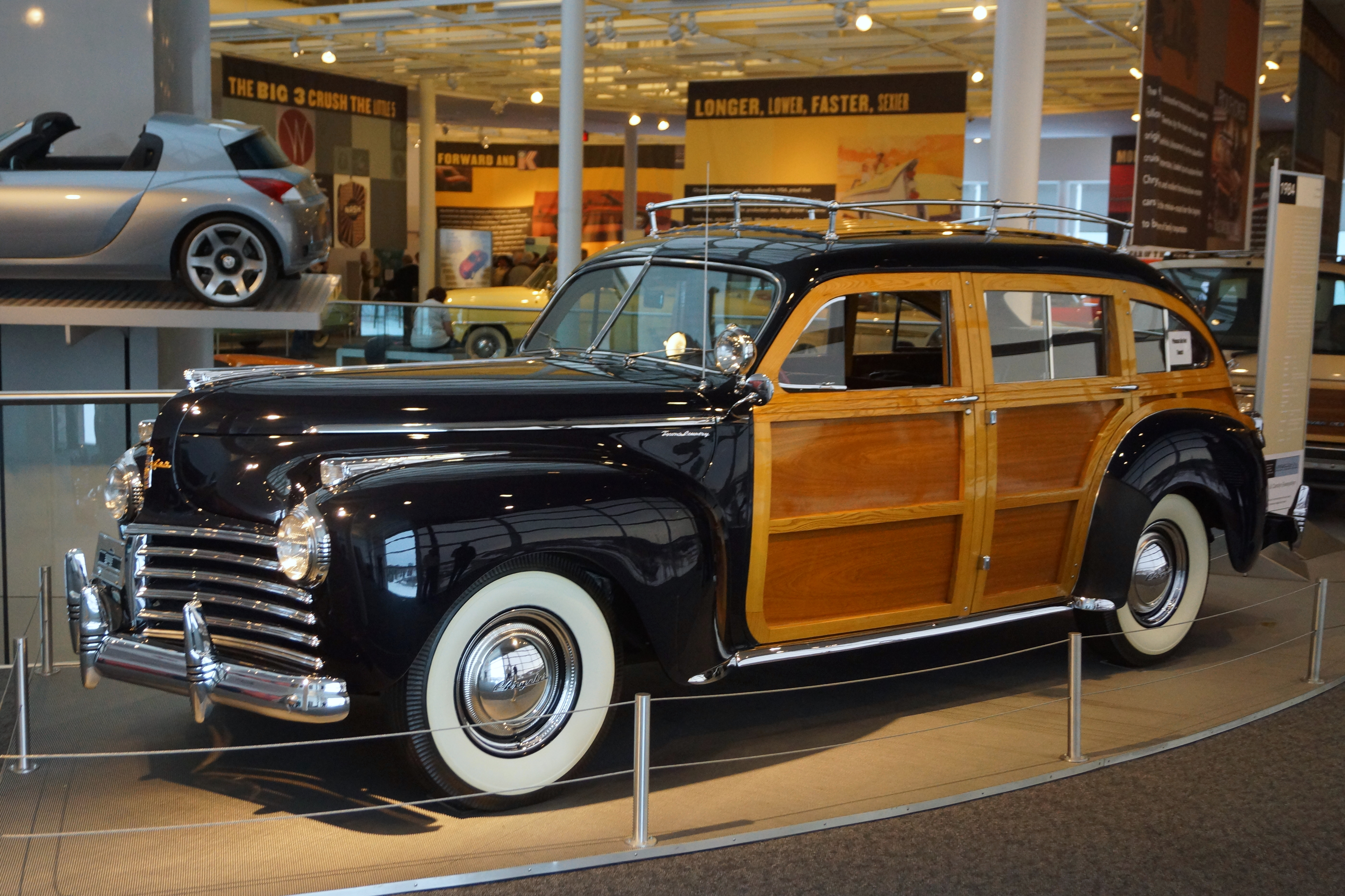
- 1941 Chrysler Town & Country

Overview
- Production: 1940–1941
- Model years: 1941–1942
- Assembly: Detroit, Michigan (Jefferson Avenue Assembly)

Body and chassis
- Body style: 4-door wagon (1941–1942)
- Layout: FR layout
- Related: Chrysler Imperial; Chrysler New Yorker; Chrysler Saratoga; Chrysler Windsor; DeSoto Custom

Powertrain
- Engine: 241.5 cu in (4.0 L) Chrysler I6; 323.5 cu in (5.3 L) Chrysler I8
- Transmission: 3-speed synchromesh manual w/Fluid Drive; Vacamatic 3-speed semi-automatic

Dimensions
- Wheelbase: 124 in (3,150 mm) (C-28 LWB); 127.5 in (3,238 mm) (C-30)
- Curb weight: 3,540–3,595 lb (1,606–1,631 kg)

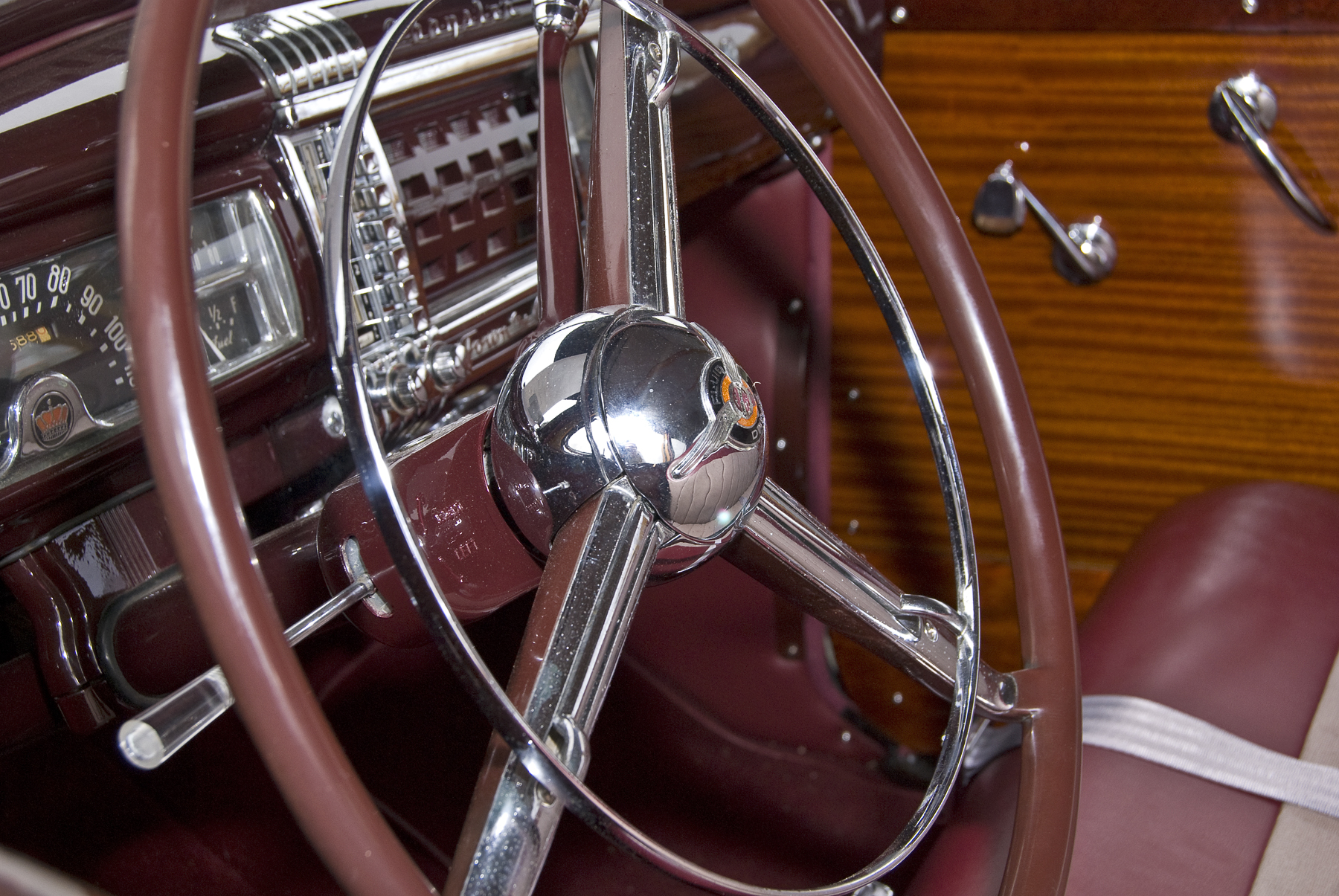
Town & Country interior

The four-door, eight-passenger Town & Country station wagon made its debut during the 1941 model year as Chrysler's first vehicle to offer wooden doors and body panels, or "woodie", with an all-steel roof. Using wood in vehicle production was not a new approach, as most cars built from the 1900s until the 1930s regularly used wood for body support, flooring, or structural uses. The car used the roof of the concurrent Chrysler Imperial limousine, which led to a rear-loading configuration with wooden double doors (also called "Barrel Back" doors) that opened out from the center beneath the fixed backlight (rear window). The wooden body framing was made from white ash, and the panels were Honduran mahogany veneer. The use of wood was not confined to exterior appearance, and carried over to the interior trunk lid and interior door panels as well. The wood panels were provided by Perkins Wood Products, and the owner's manual suggested that the wood panels be varnished every six months.

The name "Town & Country" was coined after another nameplate Chrysler offered for another six-passenger sedan, called the "Town Sedan", on the Windsor, Saratoga, and New Yorker product lines from 1941 to 1942.

It was introduced with the straight-six engine as an alternative to the Buick Estate, Oldsmobile Series 60, and Packard One-Ten woodie station wagons. This engine was installed in the Series C-28 Windsor, offering six or nine passenger accommodation with a six-cylinder engine, or the Series C-30 Saratoga, with the straight-eight engine and nine passenger accommodation (of which only one was specially requested for 1941). It was offered as a response to the eight-cylinder Buick Super and the Packard One-Twenty woodie station wagons. Prices listed for the six-cylinder Series C-28 Windsor wagon were US$1,492 ($32,659 in 2025 dollars). According to production totals of vehicles installed with the six-cylinder engine, 200 six-passenger wagons were made, and 797 nine-passenger wagons found buyers.

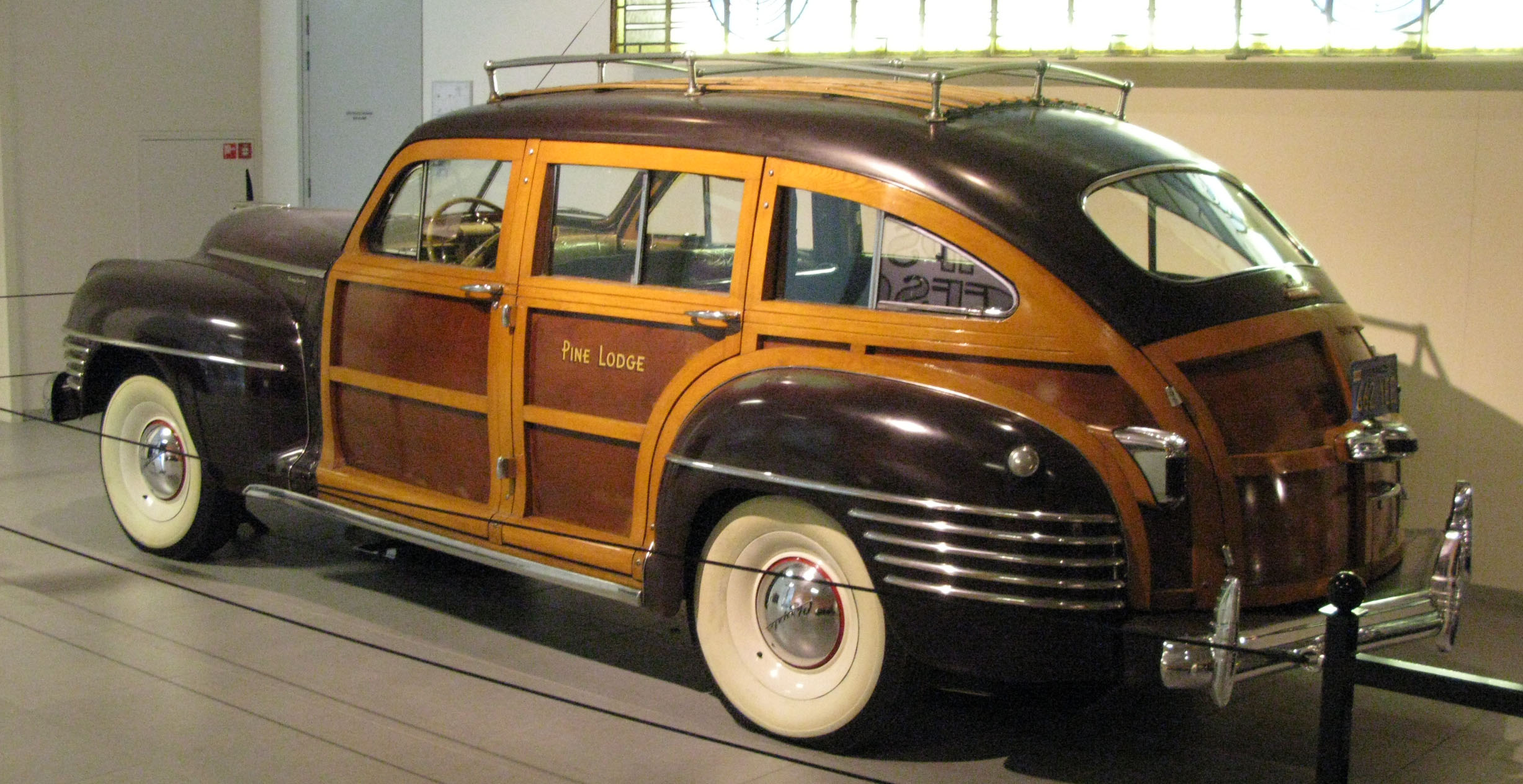
1942 Chrysler Town & Country 4-door 9-passenger wagon (pre-war)

The 1942 Town & Country had a shortened production run due to the U.S.' entry into World War II. Less than 1,000 units had been produced since the vehicle's introduction a year earlier. The wagon that was installed with the straight-eight was moved to the New Yorker line from the previous Saratoga, with only one New Yorker Town & Country wagon specially manufactured, while the straight-six remained with the Windsor line. A total of 999 total wagons were made in six- and nine-passenger configurations.

== 1946–1950 ==
First generation
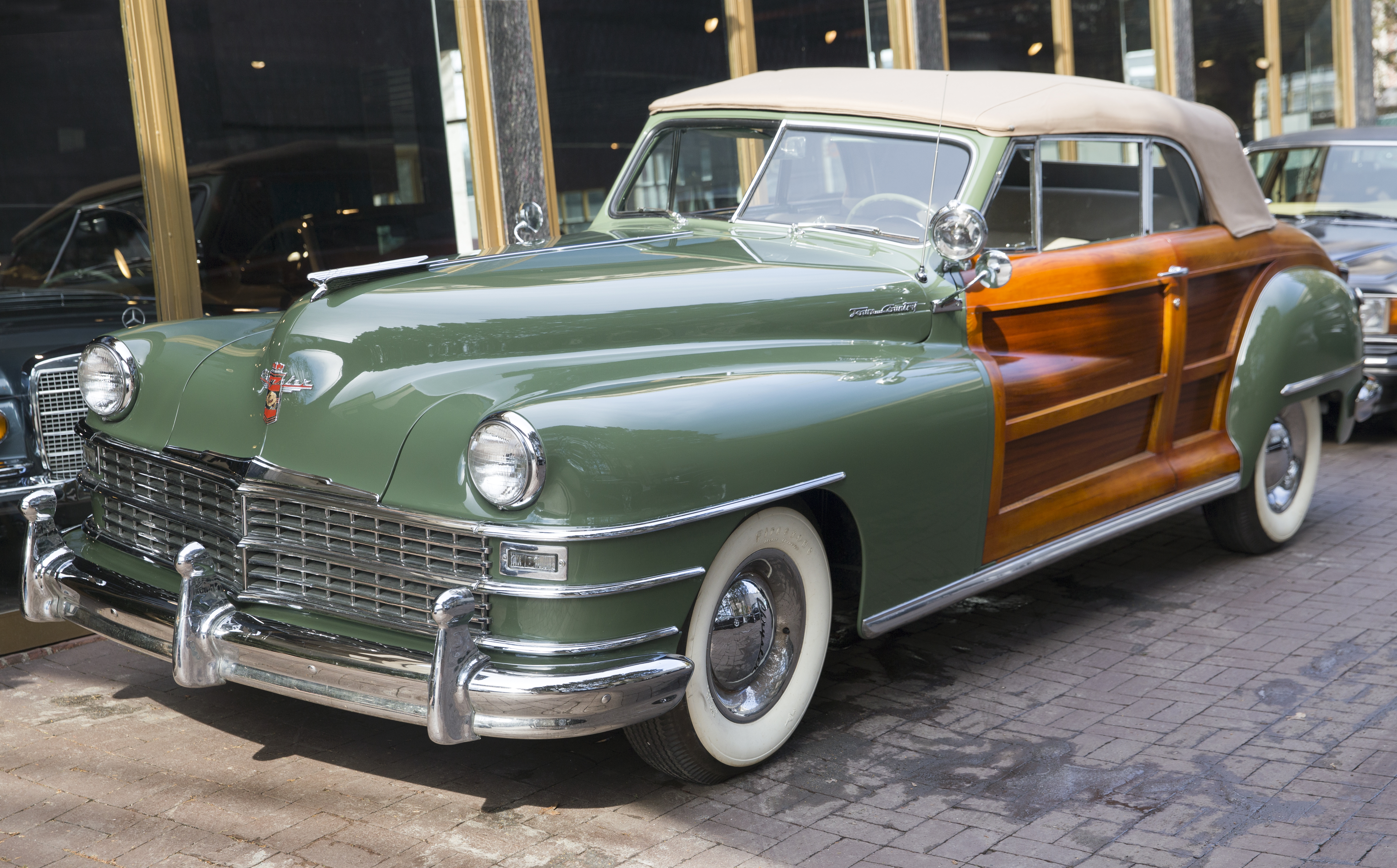
- 1948 Chrysler Town & Country 2-door convertible

Overview
- Production: 1945–1950
- Model years: 1946–1950
- Assembly: Detroit, Michigan (Jefferson Avenue Assembly) (1948 onward); Los Angeles, California (Los Angeles (Maywood) Assembly)

Body and chassis
- Body style: 4-door sedan (1946–1948); 2-door hardtop (1950 only); 2-door convertible (1946–1949)
- Layout: FR layout
- Related: Chrysler Imperial; Chrysler New Yorker; Chrysler Saratoga; Chrysler Windsor; DeSoto Custom

Powertrain
- Engine: 250.6 cu in (4.1 L) Chrysler I6; 323.5 cu in (5.3 L) Chrysler I8
- Transmission: 3-speed synchromesh manual 3-speed synchromesh manual w/Fluid Drive; Presto-Matic 3-speed semi-automatic

Dimensions
- Wheelbase: 121.5 in (3,086 mm) (straight 6); 127.5 in (3,238 mm) (straight 8)
- Length: 208.3 in (5,291 mm) (straight 6); 214.3 in (5,443 mm) (straight 8)
- Width: 77.8 in (1,976 mm)

After World War II, the Town & Country nameplate returned, though the 4-door 8-passenger station wagon did not. Only the 1946 4-door sedan and 2-door convertible were offered. However, the 1946 Town & Country sales brochure described and illustrated a roadster, a 2-door sedan called the Brougham, and a 2-door hardtop called the Custom Club Coupe. None of these three additional body styles progressed beyond the prototype stage, with only one Brougham and seven Custom Club Coupes being built. It would be another three years before General Motors would offer the first mass-produced 2-door hardtops, while the Town & Country range would not see a production 2-door hardtop until a year after that. The wooden body framing was made from white ash, and the panels were mahogany veneer, but were now bonded to steel body panels. The average retail price was listed at US$2,609 ($43,075 in 2025 dollars), and production totals were documented at 2,169.

For the 1947 model year, the Town & Country 4-door sedan and the 2-door convertible were each carried over with just a few improvements from the previous year.

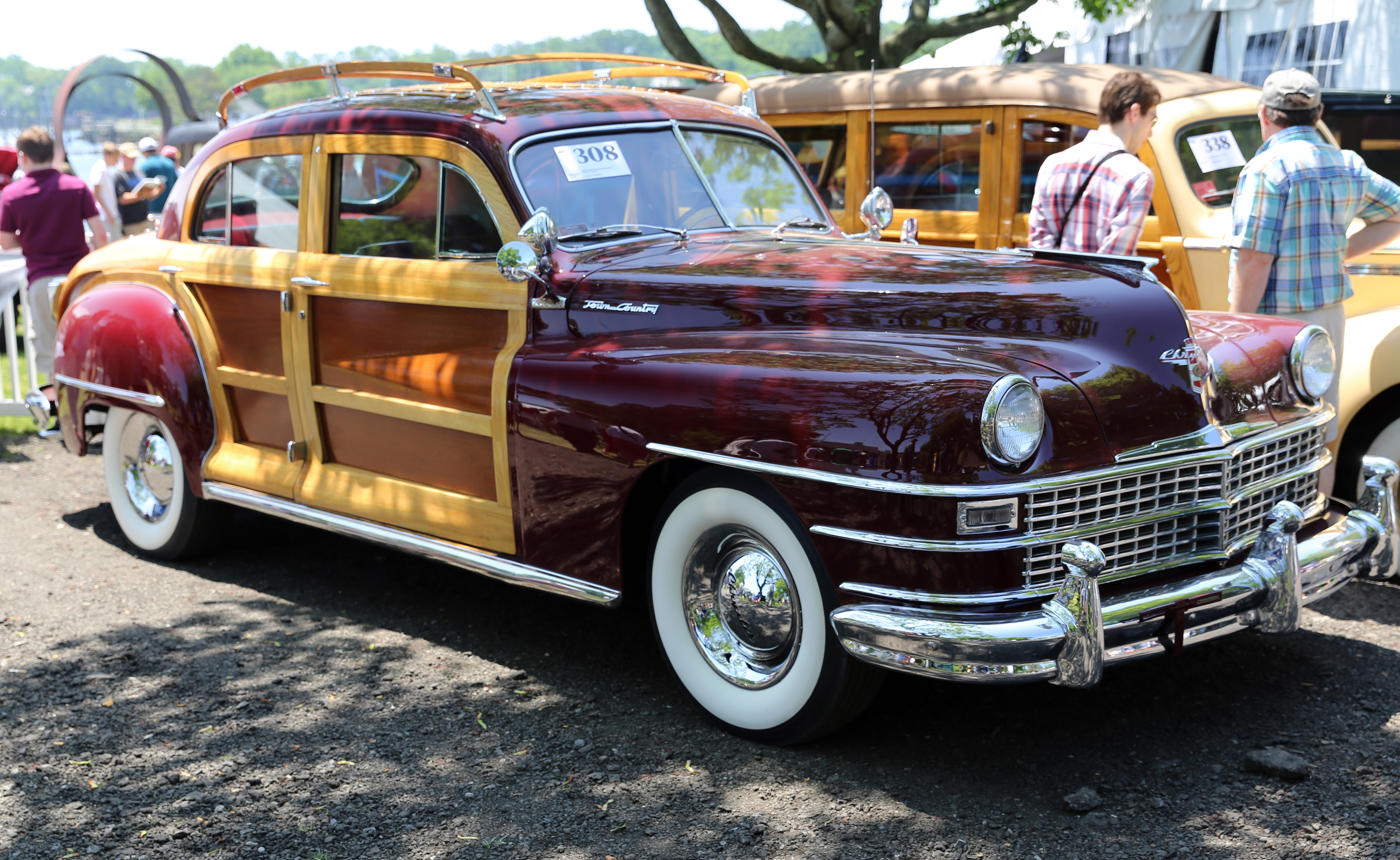
1948 Chrysler Town & Country sedan

The 1948 model year would be the last for the Town & Country 4-door sedan, after a three-year production run. The 2-door convertible carried over with very few improvements from the previous year. This was also the year the genuine Honduran mahogany wood panels were replaced by DI-NOC vinyl panels. A similar appearance sedan was also introduced in 1948, called the Packard Station Sedan, which resembled a sedan but had a two-piece tailgate constructed entirely of wood.

After a four-year production run, 1949 would be the last model year for the Town & Country 2-door convertible, which again received very few improvements from the previous year. Chrysler's 1949 models were the company's first to be designed after World War II, with a longer wheelbase (131.5 in), based upon the New Yorker.

The 1950 2-door Town & Country Newport hardtop was Chrysler's last true woodie offering, while the panels were now simulated. This year also marked the introduction of optional windshield washers, which are now a standard feature on all cars worldwide.

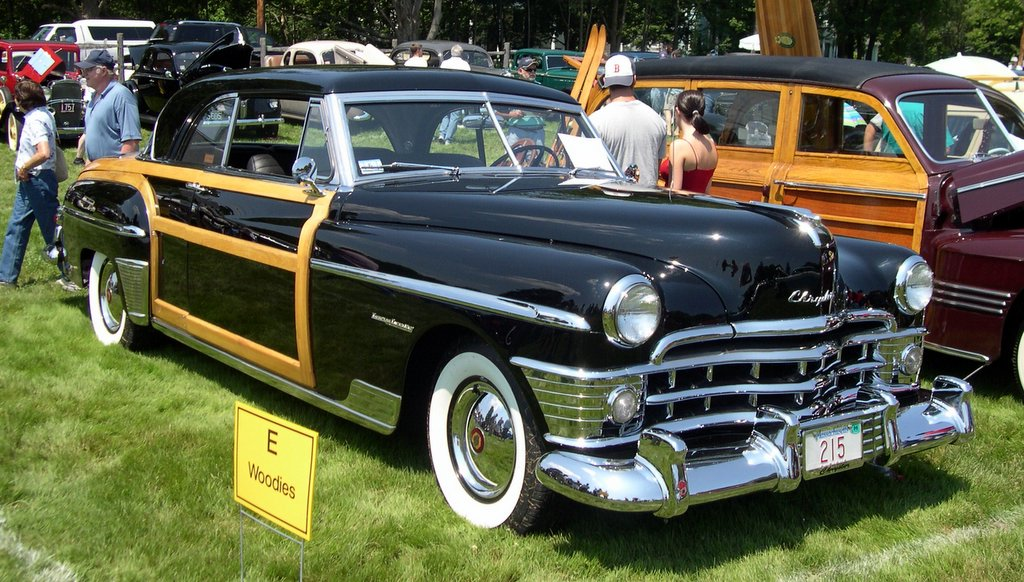
1950 Chrysler Town & Country Newport 2-door hardtop (post-war)

The 1950 Crosley Hot Shot is often given credit for the first production disc brakes, but the 1949 Chrysler Imperial Crown was actually the first to offer them as standard equipment. The Chrysler 4-wheel disc brake system was built by Auto Specialties Manufacturing Company (Ausco) of St. Joseph, Michigan, under patents of inventor H.L. Lambert, and was first tested on a 1939 Plymouth. Unlike the caliper disc, the Ausco-Lambert brake utilized twin expanding discs that rubbed against the inner surface of a cast-iron brake drum, which doubled as the brake housing. The Ausco-Lambert disc brake was complex, and because of the expense, the brakes were only standard on the Chrysler Imperial Crown through 1954 and the Town & Country Newport in 1950. They were optional, however, on other Chryslers, priced around $400 ($5,353 in 2025 dollars), at a time when a Crosley Hot Shot retailed for $935 ($12,512 in 2025 dollars).

== 1951–1959 ==
Second generation
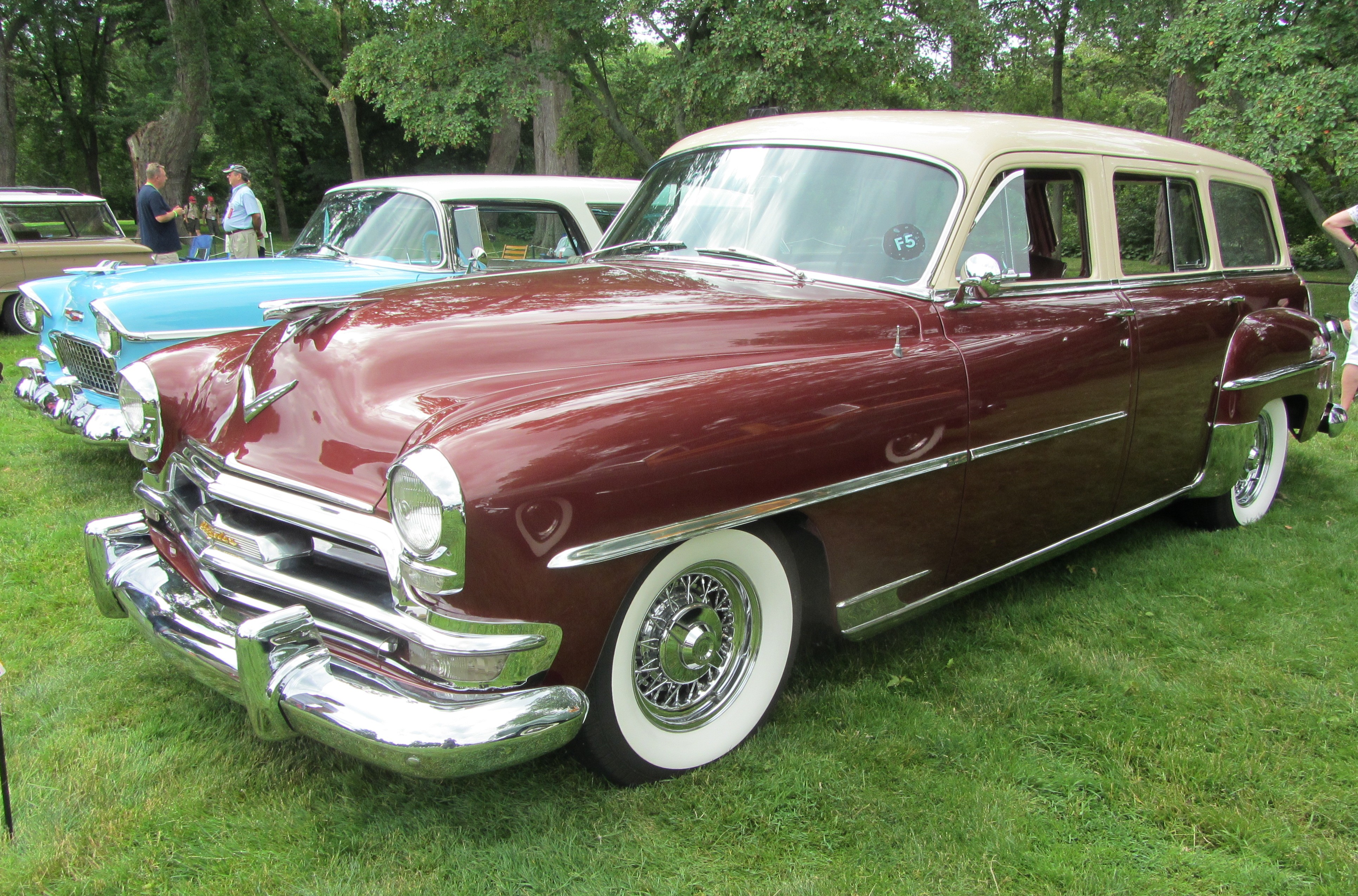
- 1954 Chrysler New Yorker Town & Country

Overview
- Production: 1950–1959
- Model years: 1951–1959
- Assembly: Detroit, Michigan (Jefferson Avenue Assembly); Los Angeles, California (Los Angeles (Maywood) Assembly)

Body and chassis
- Body style: 4-door station wagon
- Layout: FR layout
- Related: Chrysler Imperial; Chrysler Windsor; Chrysler Saratoga; Chrysler New Yorker; DeSoto Custom; DeSoto Powermaster; DeSoto Firesweep

Powertrain
- Engine: 250.6 cu in (4.1 L) Chrysler I6; 264.5 cu in (4.3 L) Chrysler I6; 331.1 cu in (5.4 L) FirePower V8; 413 cu in (6.8 L) Golden Lion V8
- Transmission: 3-speed manual 2-speed PowerFlite automatic (1955); 3-speed TorqueFlite automatic (1956)

Dimensions
- Wheelbase: 125.5 in (3,188 mm); 131.5 in (3,340 mm)
- Length: 206.5 in (5,245 mm)
- Width: 74.8 in (1,900 mm)
- Height: 62.5 in (1,588 mm)

After the woodie coupes, sedans, and convertibles were discontinued, the Town & Country nameplate was used on an all steel-bodied full-size rear wheel drive station wagon, coinciding with the debut of Chrysler's first V8 engine, which was originally called FireDome but later unofficially called HEMI. This wagon introduced several firsts, including roll-down rear windows for tailgates for 1951 and rear-facing third-row seats for 1957. It shared the chassis, engine, transmission and interior luxury features with the Chrysler Imperial, including a simulated leather and broadcloth upholstery. The previous generations' use of wood paneling bonded to the exterior steel body panels was discontinued due to durability and appearance upkeep issues, although it was still used on the DeSoto Firedome and Dodge Coronet. Production totals for the 1951 Windsor Town & Country were 1,967, while 1,299 Saratoga Town & Country and 251 New Yorker Town & Country were produced, with the New Yorker station wagon listed at US$4,026 ($49,938 in 2025 dollars). The Town & Country was luxurious and expensive and sold in limited numbers, averaging 1,900 each year for both the Windsor and New Yorker versions. The Windsor Deluxe sedan typically sold 64,000 and the New Yorker Deluxe sedan 34,000 each year, averaging US$2,660 ($32,994 in 2025 dollars) for the Windsor sedan and US$3,494 ($43,339 in 2025 dollars) for the New Yorker sedan.

The 1951 Town & Country wagons were offered in the Windsor, Saratoga, and New Yorker series, and featured split folding second row seats as standard equipment, with a hardwood-covered cargo area and chrome-covered steel load strips to aid in loading cargo, an appearance that remained for several decades. For 1955, Chrysler introduced the 2-speed PowerFlite automatic, a dashboard-installed "Finger-Tip" lever that replaced the steering column installed gear selector. In 1956, the 3-speed TorqueFlite automatic was introduced, with mechanically operated buttons to the left of the steering wheel as standard equipment until 1965. The New Yorker version was discontinued for 1952, but reappeared for 1953, when the Saratoga series was dropped.

For 1953, power windows, a heater and windshield defroster, windshield washer jets, power steering and power assist brakes were first installed on all Chryslers as optional equipment, with 41 different exterior color combinations. Two-speed windshield wipers also were installed as standard equipment, as well as directional turn signals and full floor carpeting. For 1954, "Air-Temp" air conditioning was offered as an option, along with "Solex" tinted windshield. 1955 saw a new appearance for Chrysler products, spearheaded by Virgil Exner and advertised as the "100-Million Dollar Look". This resulted in a longer, lower, wider stance that saw successful sales for Chrysler vehicles, including the Town & Country, while production totals were still modest for the luxury segment. The "Super-Scenic" wraparound windshield greatly improved outward visibility, and a power adjustable front bench seat was now optional along with wire spoke wheels.

Production totals for 1956 continued to be modest for both the Windsor and New Yorker variants of the Town & Country, averaging 2,700 for the Windsor and 1,070 for the New Yorker, with retail prices of US$3,598 ($42,608 in 2025 dollars) and US$4,523 ($53,562 in 2025 dollars) respectively. The Windsor version remained through 1960, and was moved to the Newport series for 1961. The new "Forward Look" was a sales success for Chrysler, but not for the Town & Country. By 1959, only 751 Windsor Town & Country vehicles were manufactured, while 444 New Yorker Town & Country vehicles had been built, with still expensive price tags of US$3,878 ($42,831 in 2025 dollars) and US$4,997 ($55,189 in 2025 dollars) respectively.

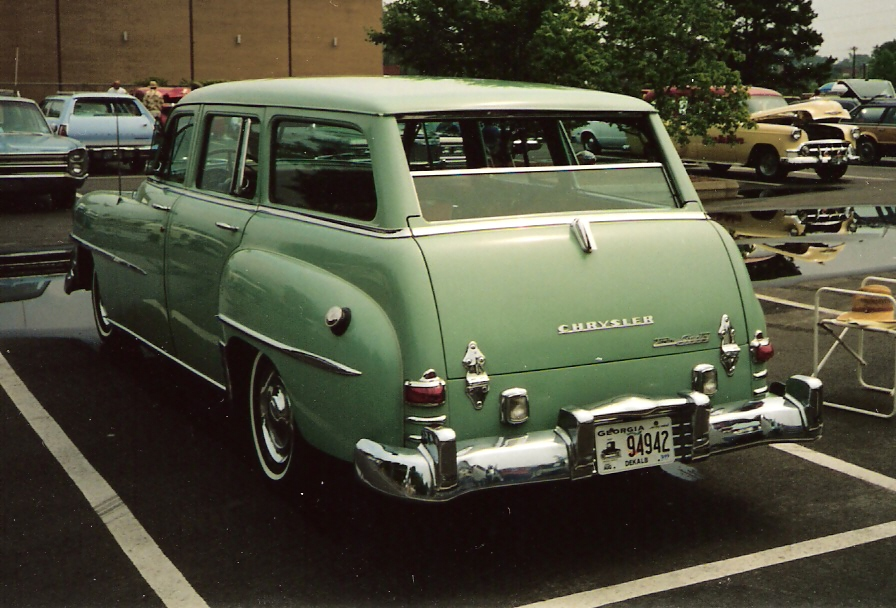
1952 Chrysler Windsor Town & Country rear view

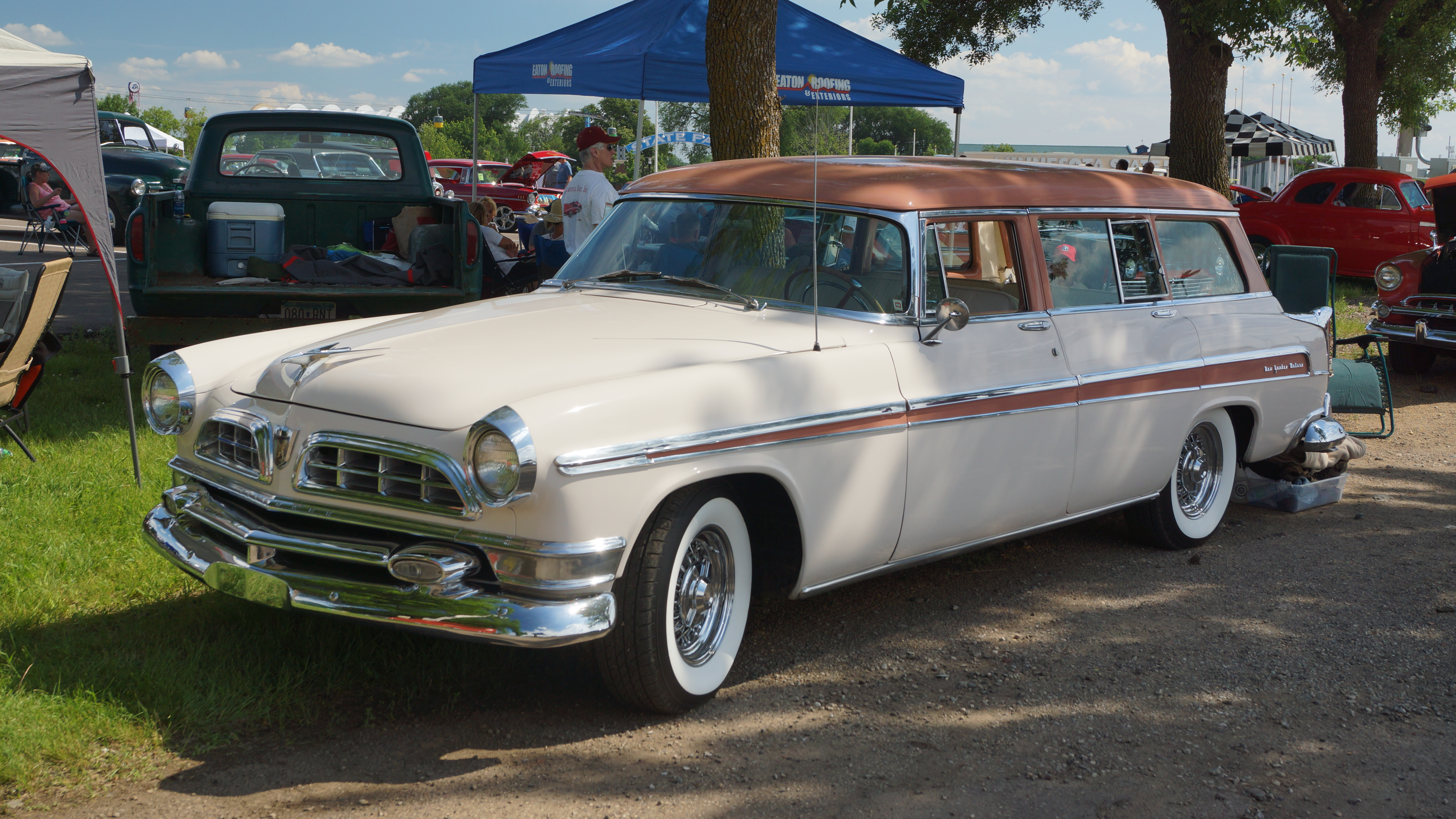
1955 Chrysler New Yorker Town & Country

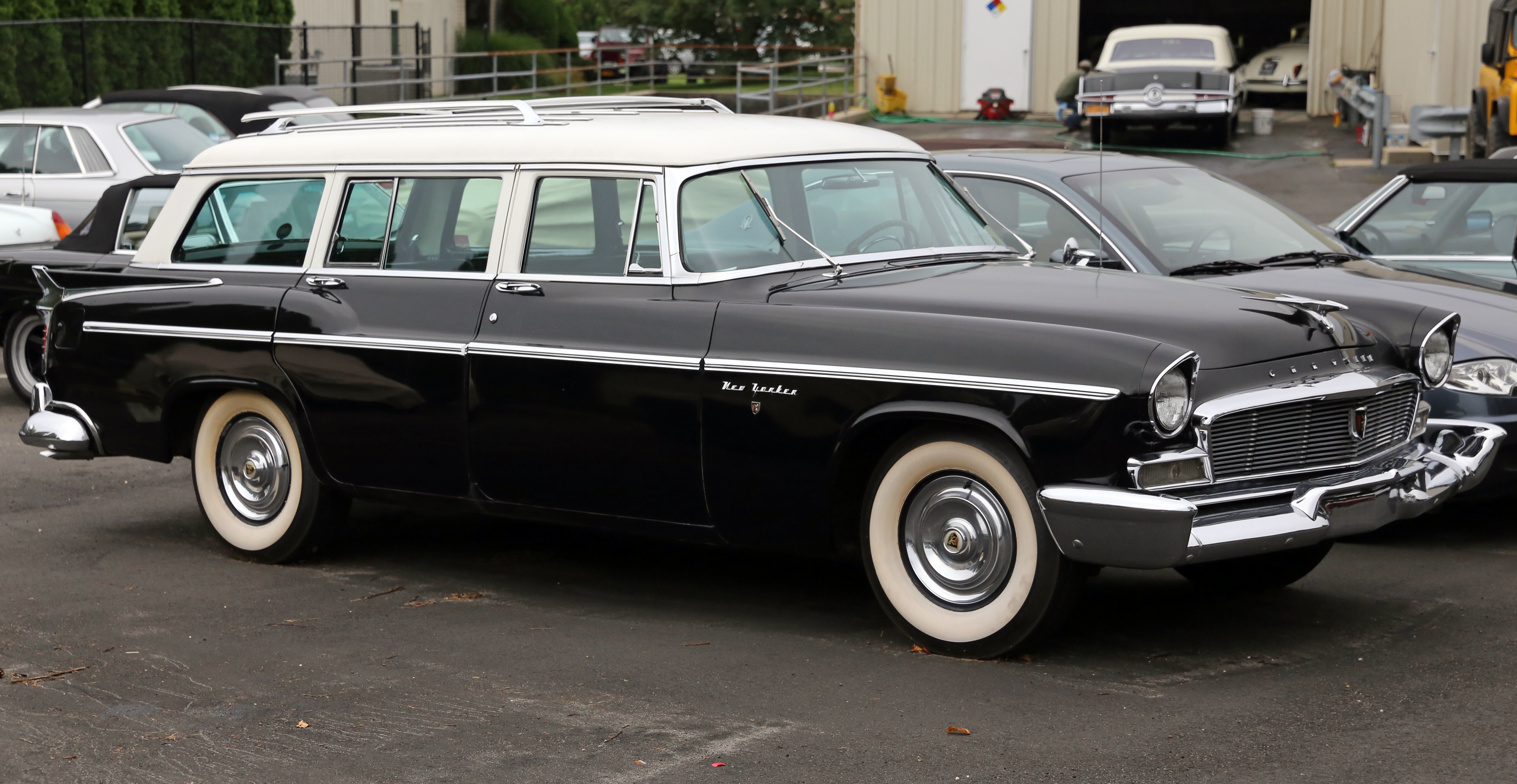
1956 Chrysler New Yorker Town & Country

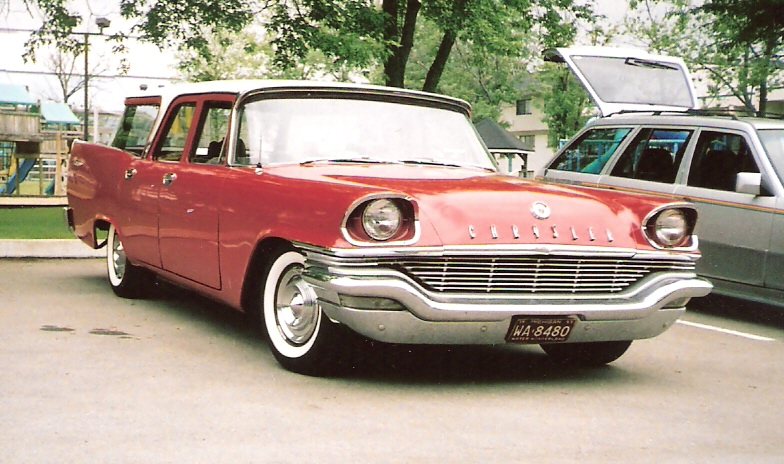
1957 Chrysler Windsor Town & Country

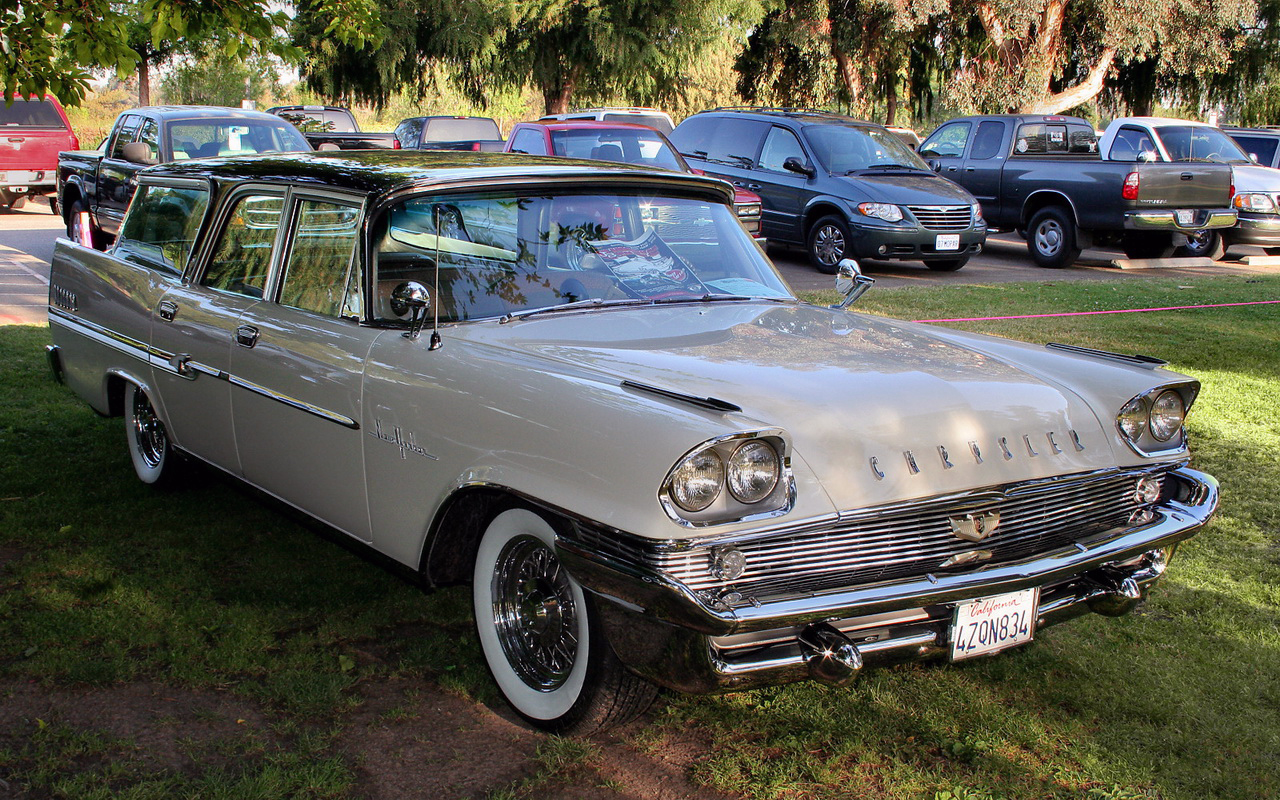
1958 Chrysler New Yorker Town & Country

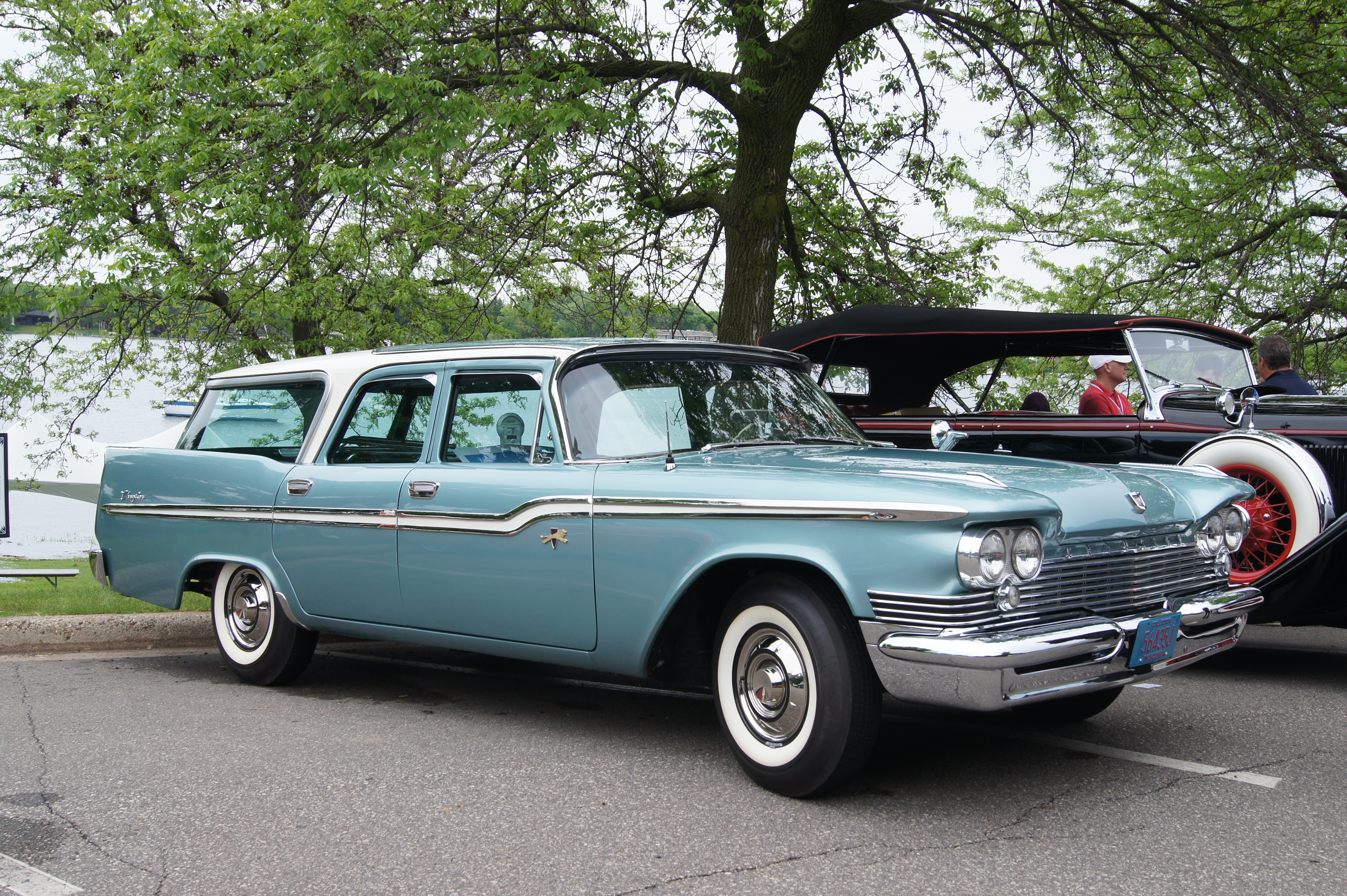
1959 Chrysler Windsor Town & Country

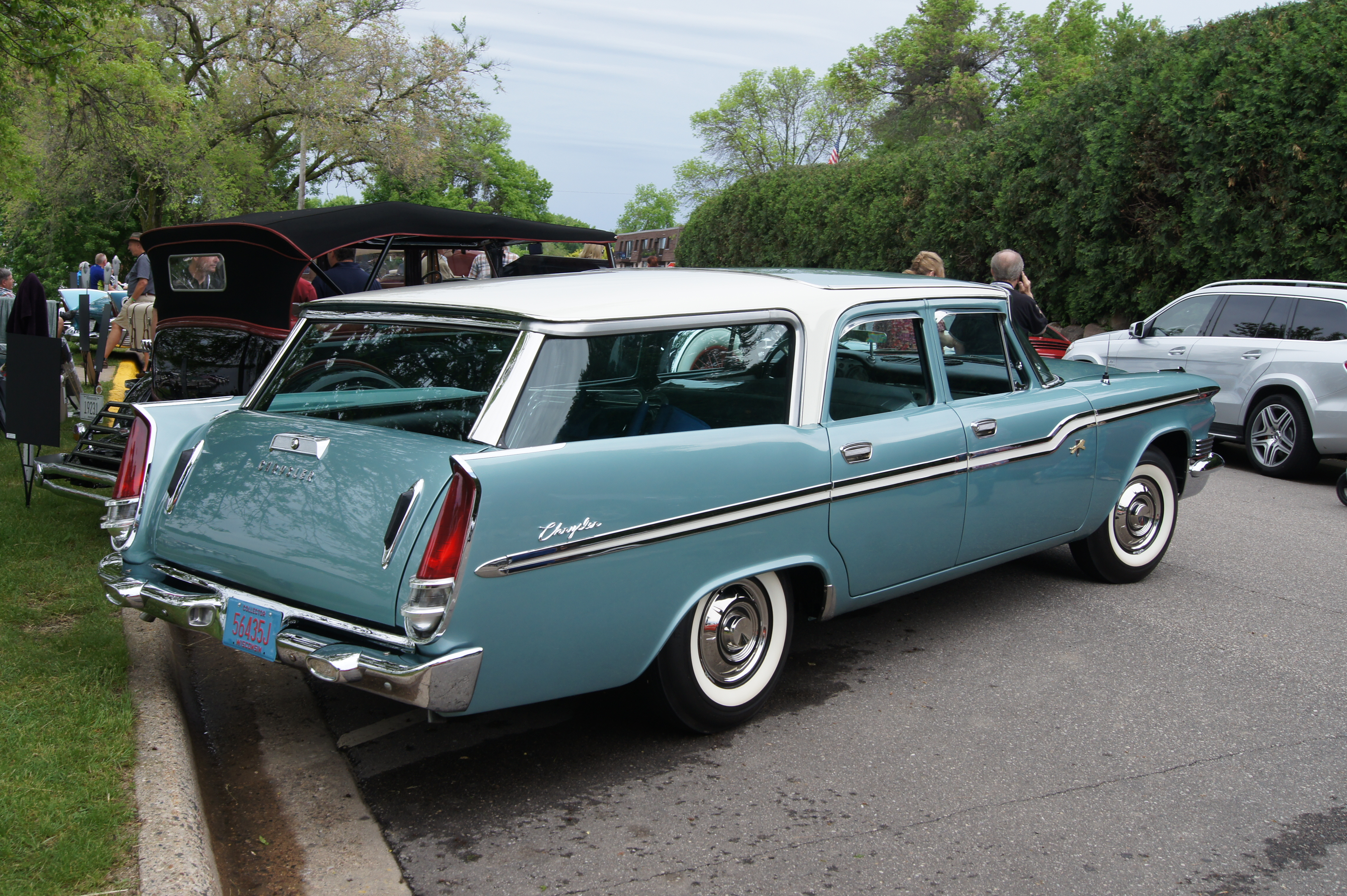
1959 Chrysler Windsor Town & Country

== 1960–1964 ==
Third generation
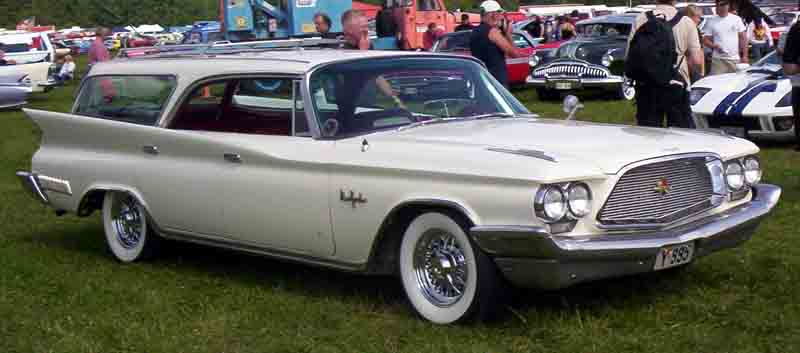
- 1960 Chrysler New Yorker Town & Country Wagon

Overview
- Production: 1959–1964
- Model years: 1960–1964
- Assembly: Detroit, Michigan (Jefferson Avenue Assembly); Los Angeles, California (Los Angeles (Maywood) Assembly)

Body and chassis
- Body style: 4-door hardtop station wagon
- Layout: FR layout
- Related: Chrysler 300; Chrysler Newport; Chrysler New Yorker; Chrysler Windsor

Powertrain
- Engine: 361 cu in (5.9 L) Wedge V8; 413 cu in (6.8 L) Wedge V8

Dimensions
- Wheelbase: 122 in (3,099 mm) (Windsor T&C); 126 in (3,200 mm) (New Yorker T&C)
- Length: 215.5 in (5,474 mm) (Windsor T&C); 219.6 in (5,578 mm) (New Yorker T&C)
- Width: 78.8 in (2,002 mm)

For model years 1960 through 1962, the New Yorker Town & Country remained on the 126-inch wheelbase, while the Windsor and later the Newport Town & Country models rode a wheelbase of 122 inches. These were the roomiest factory-bodied, automobile-based station wagons on the market at the time. Chrysler also introduced hardtop styling as standard on Chrysler-branded models for the first time. These were the first large wagons, and among the largest automobiles with unibody construction. The 1960 New Yorker Town & Country nine-passenger station wagon was US$5,131 ($55,841 in 2025 dollars); 671 have been recorded to have been manufactured. Starting in 1958, Chryslers were optionally equipped with Captive-Aire tires that remained inflated regardless of a tire puncture for $94 ($1,023 in 2025 dollars). In 1957, Chrysler introduced a new torsion bar front suspension called Torsion-Aire, which replaced the previous coil spring front suspension.

The dashboard had been designed with Chrysler's button controls for the TorqueFlite automatic in mind, with the "AstraDome" instrument cluster covering the part of the steering column. As standard practice, a column shifter would come out from under, and manual cars thus used a floor shifter. Due to the installation of the "AstraDome" instrument cluster extending outward towards the steering wheel, the traditional installation of the turn signal lever was relocated to the dashboard, underneath the "TorqueFlite" pushbutton gear selectors, and was installed as a sliding lever that would return to center as the steering wheel returned to the center position.

When the program to create Chryslers for 1962 was abruptly canceled in 1960, both of the 1962 Town & Country wagons (Newport and New Yorker) were instead created by mating their 1961 front ends (updated for 1962) to the body of a 1961 4-door Plymouth station wagon. The Plymouth wagon was chosen because it was Chrysler's only finless, full-sized station wagon. Its existing taillights were replaced by wrap-around units.

For 1963, all Chrysler models, including the New Yorker, were standardized on the shorter Newport 122 inch wheelbase. Both New Yorker and Newport trim level Town & Country wagons continued as four-door hardtops through 1964, making them the last American station wagons offered in this short-lived configuration. Powertrains and standard equipment remained familiar. A 340 hp 4-BBL 413 cu.in. V8 with Torqueflite AT, as well as power steering and power brakes, remained standard on the New Yorker Town & Country. The Newport Town & Country shared that model's standard 265 hp 2-BBL 361 cu. in. V8 with 3-speed synchromesh transmission and floor shifter. Both continued to offer six- and nine-passenger variants, as well as a long list of optional equipment. The New Yorker remained unique among large American wagons, offering the option of bucket front seats with center cushion and folding armrest.

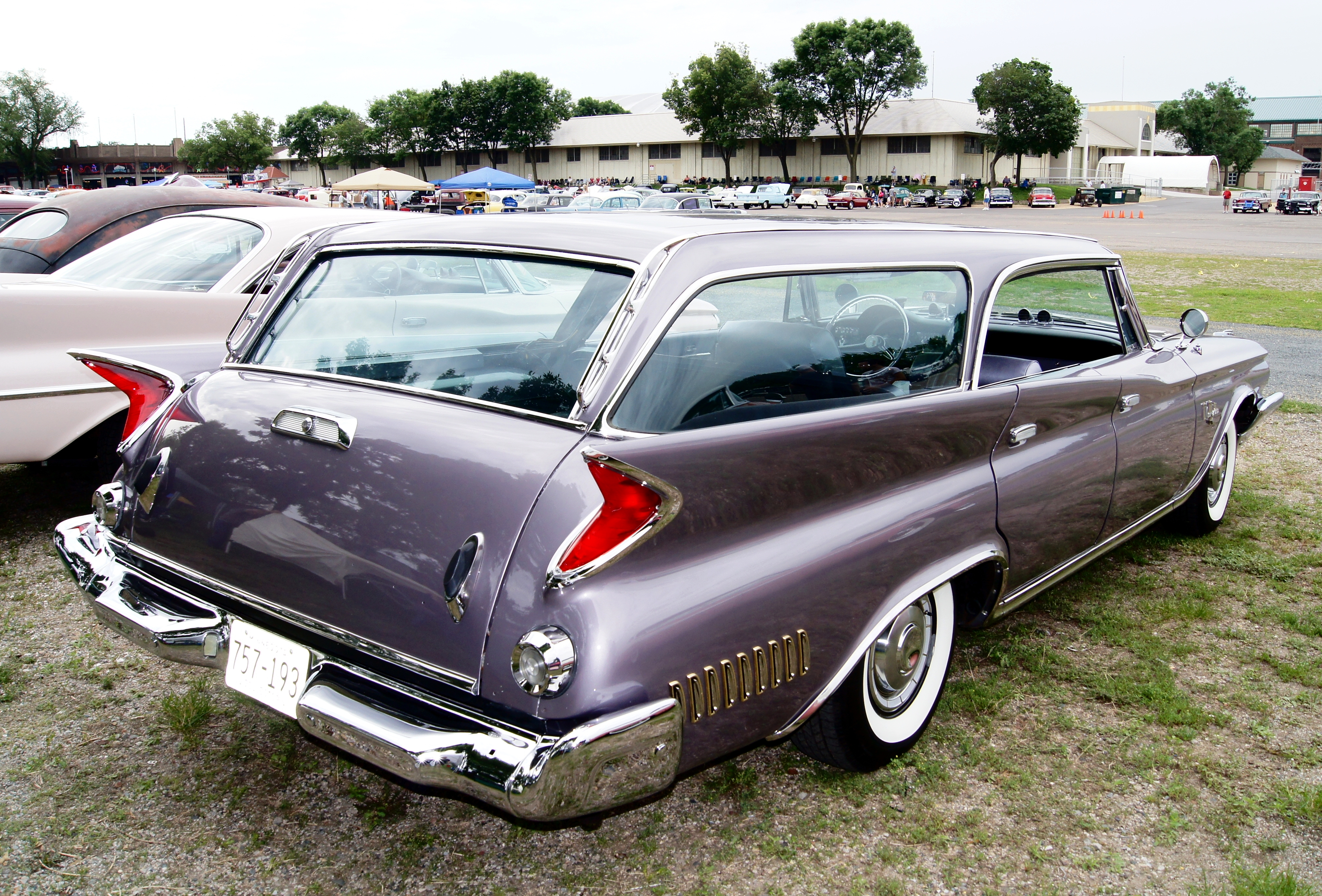
1960 Chrysler New Yorker Town & Country (rear view)

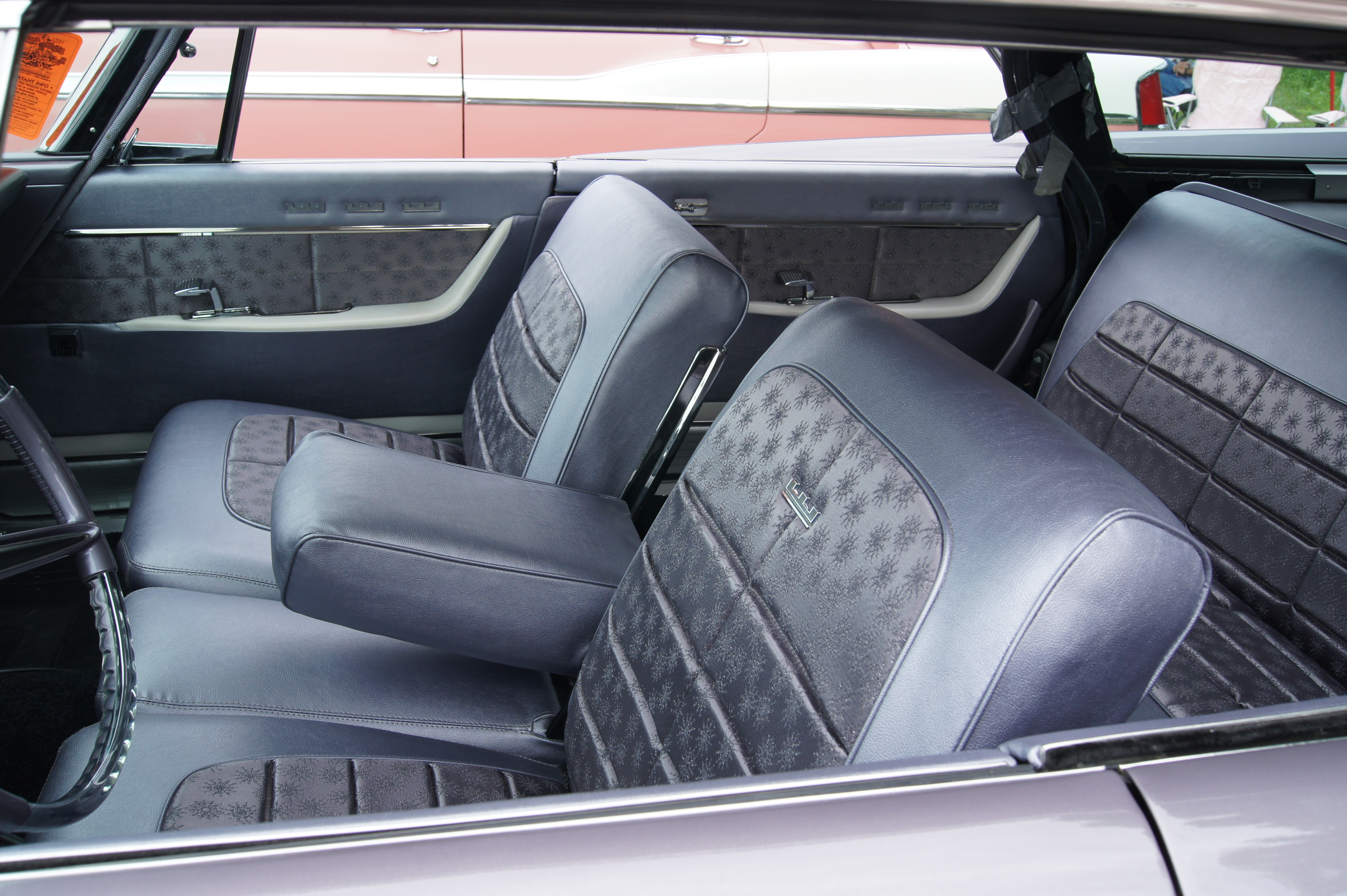
Interior of 1960 Chrysler New Yorker Town & Country

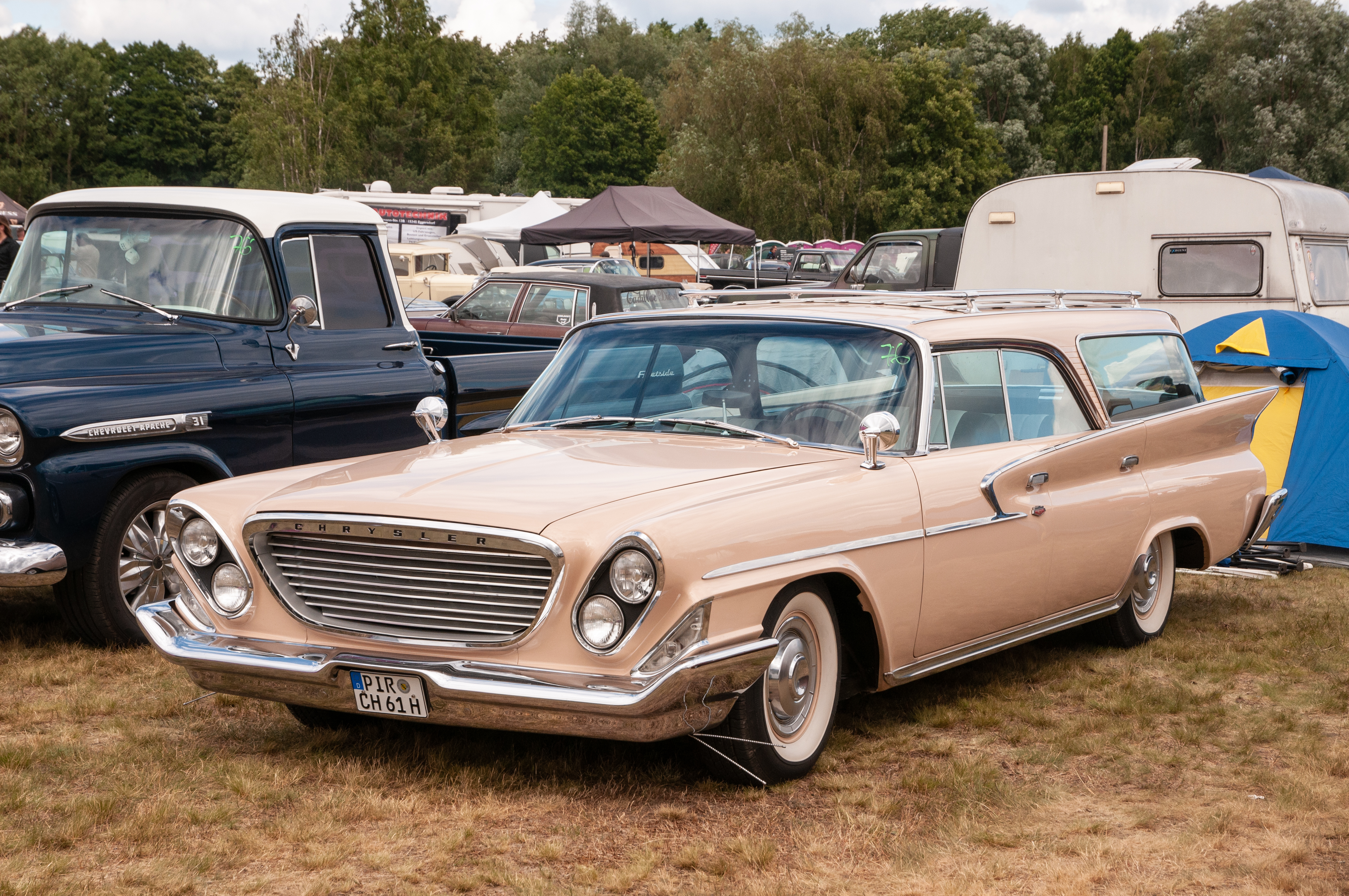
1961 Chrysler Newport Town & Country

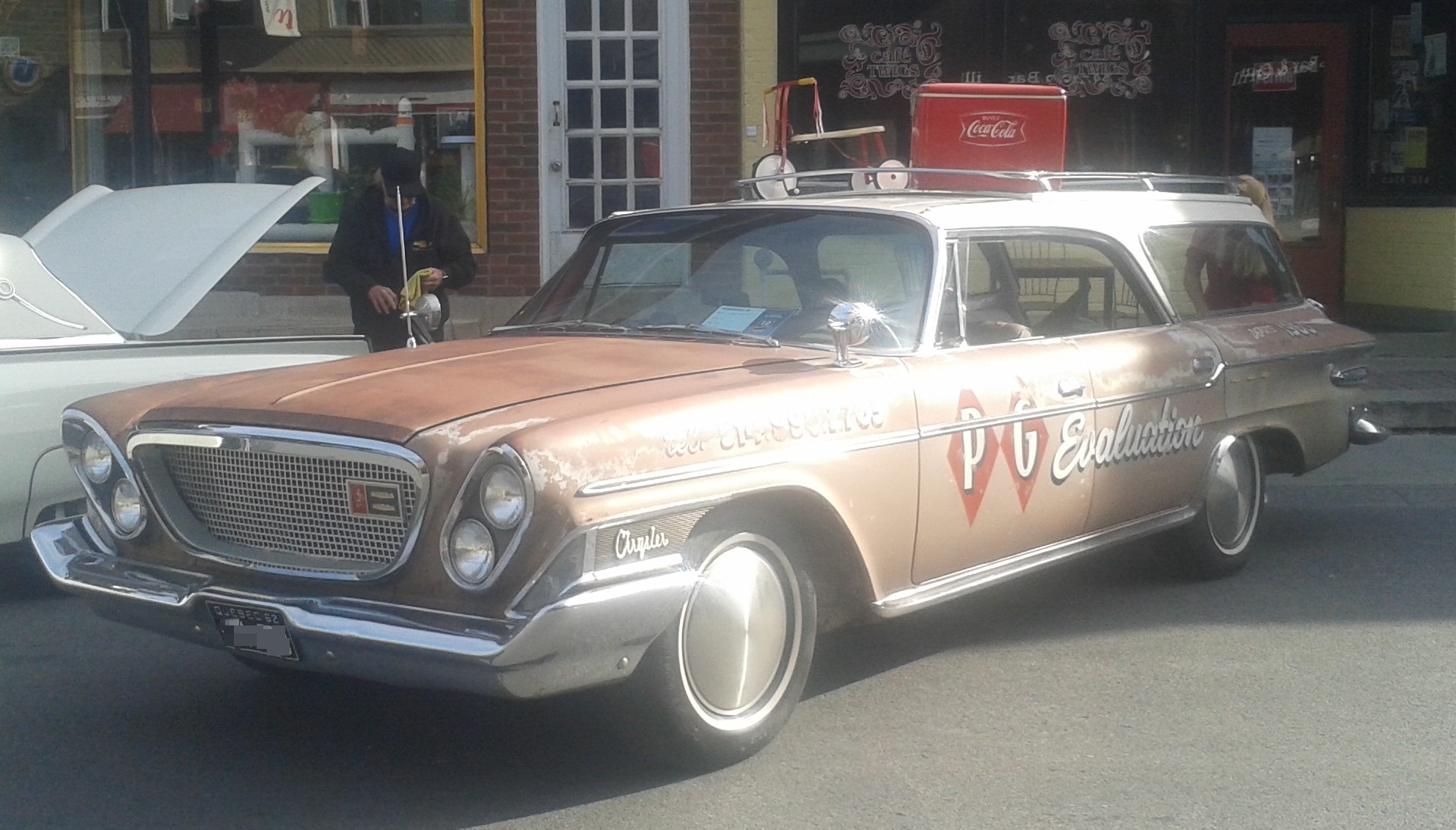
1962 Chrysler Newport Town & Country (with non-standard wheel covers)

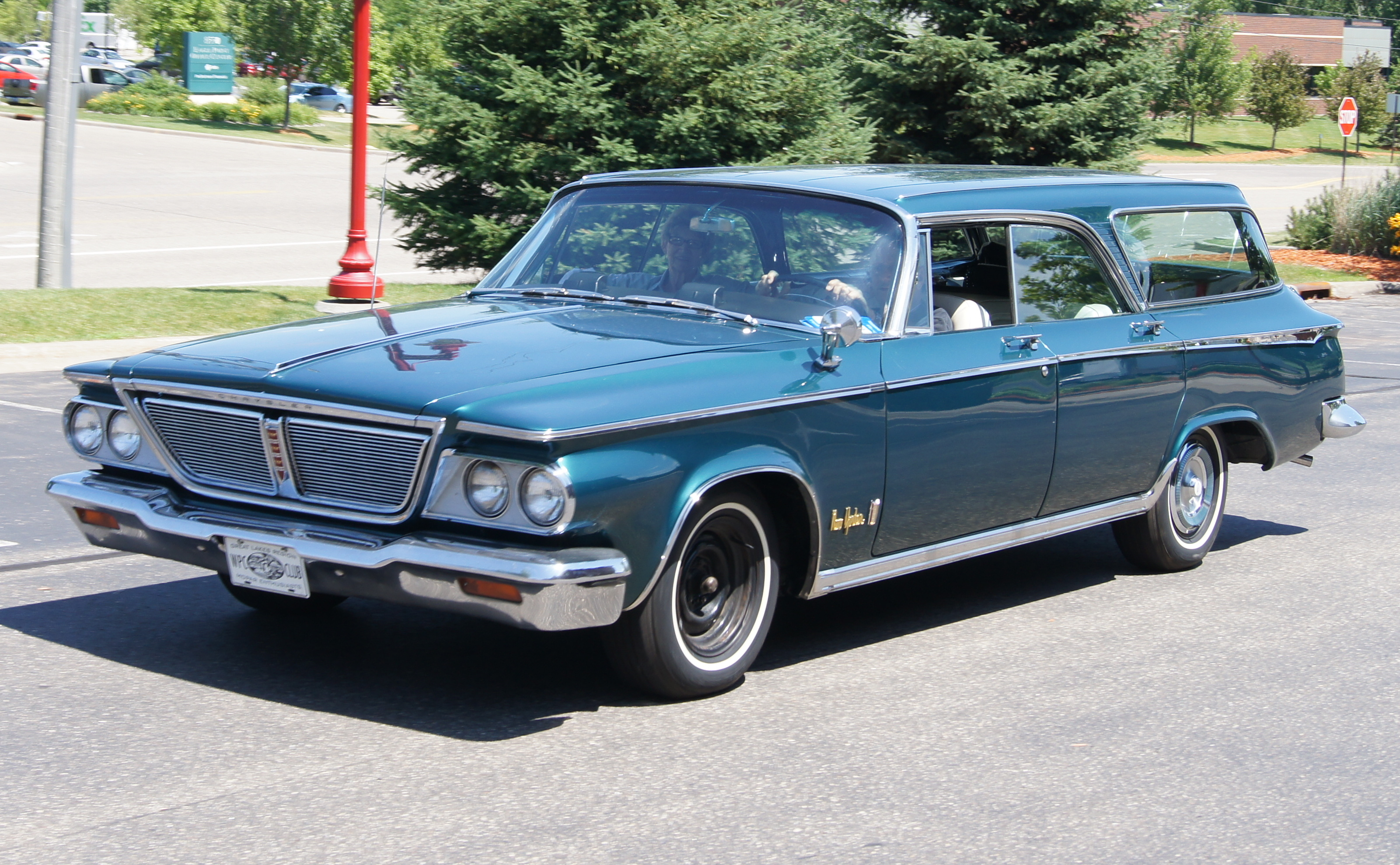
1964 Chrysler New Yorker Town & Country

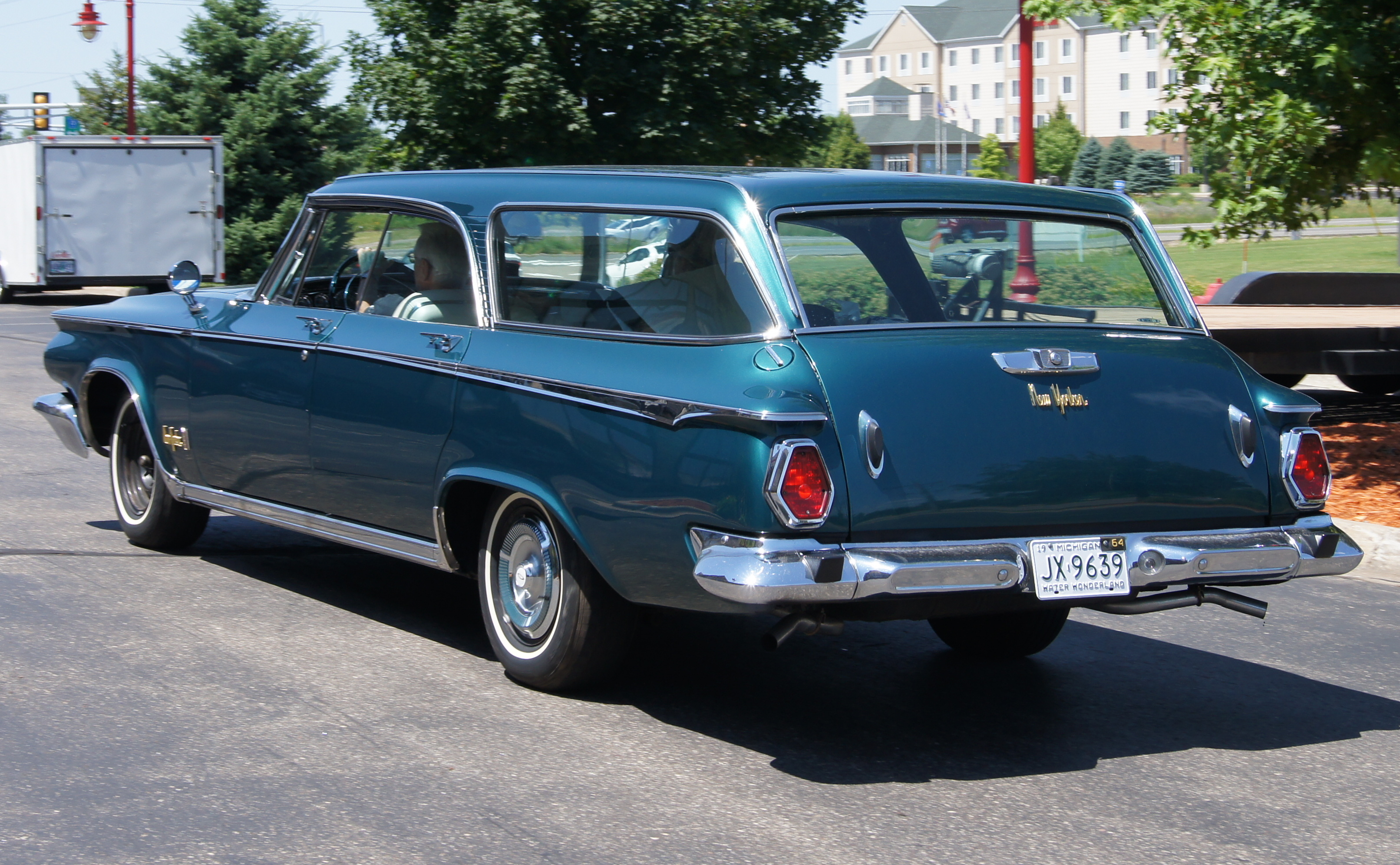
1964 Chrysler New Yorker Town & Country (rear view)

== 1965–1968 ==
Fourth generation
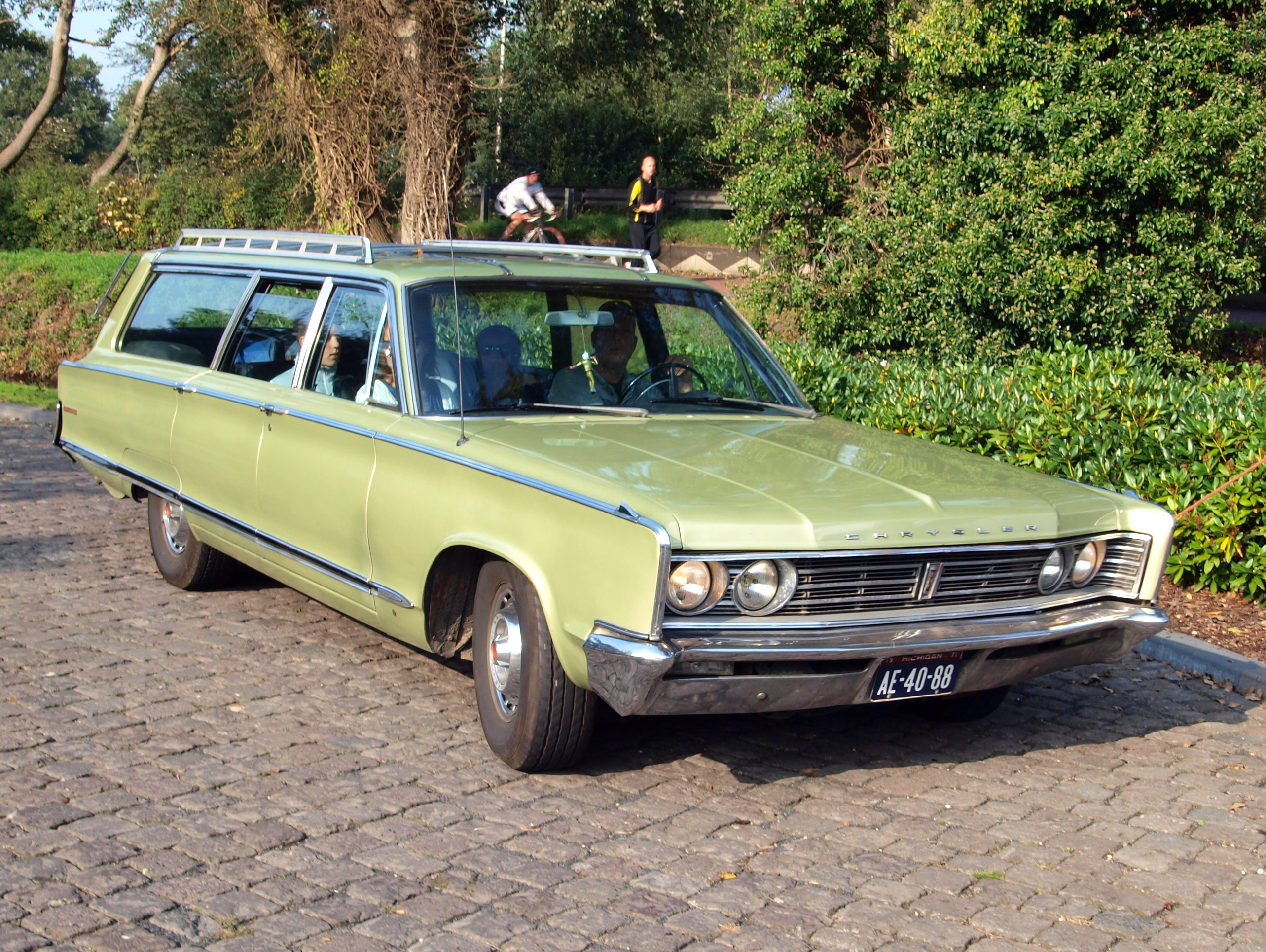
- 1966 Chrysler Town & Country

Overview
- Production: 1964–1968
- Model years: 1965–1968
- Assembly: Detroit, Michigan (Jefferson Avenue Assembly); Belvidere, Illinois (Belvidere Assembly Plant)

Body and chassis
- Body style: 4-door station wagon; 2-door hardtop (1968–1969); 2-door convertible
- Layout: FR layout
- Platform: C-body
- Related: Imperial; Chrysler New Yorker; Dodge Polara; Plymouth Fury; Dodge Monaco; Plymouth VIP; Chrysler 300; Chrysler Newport; Dodge Custom 880; Chrysler 300L

Powertrain
- Engine: 383 cu in (6.3 L) RB V8; 413 cu in (6.8 L) RB V8; 440 cu in (7.2 L) RB V8
- Transmission: 3-speed A-727 automatic

Dimensions
- Wheelbase: 121 in (3,073 mm)
- Length: 220 in (5,588 mm)

All of Chrysler's full-sized cars, except the Imperial, received major makeovers for the 1965 model year. They were the work of chief of design, Elwood Engel, who had been hired away from Ford a few years earlier. The unitized body and chassis, with longitudinal front torsion bars and rear leaf springs, carried over from the prior generation. The wood-sided appearance which was last used in 1950 returned, albeit in a simulated form. The 1965 New Yorker Town & Country station wagon was US$5,033 ($51,420 in 2025 dollars); 1,697 were recorded to have been manufactured.

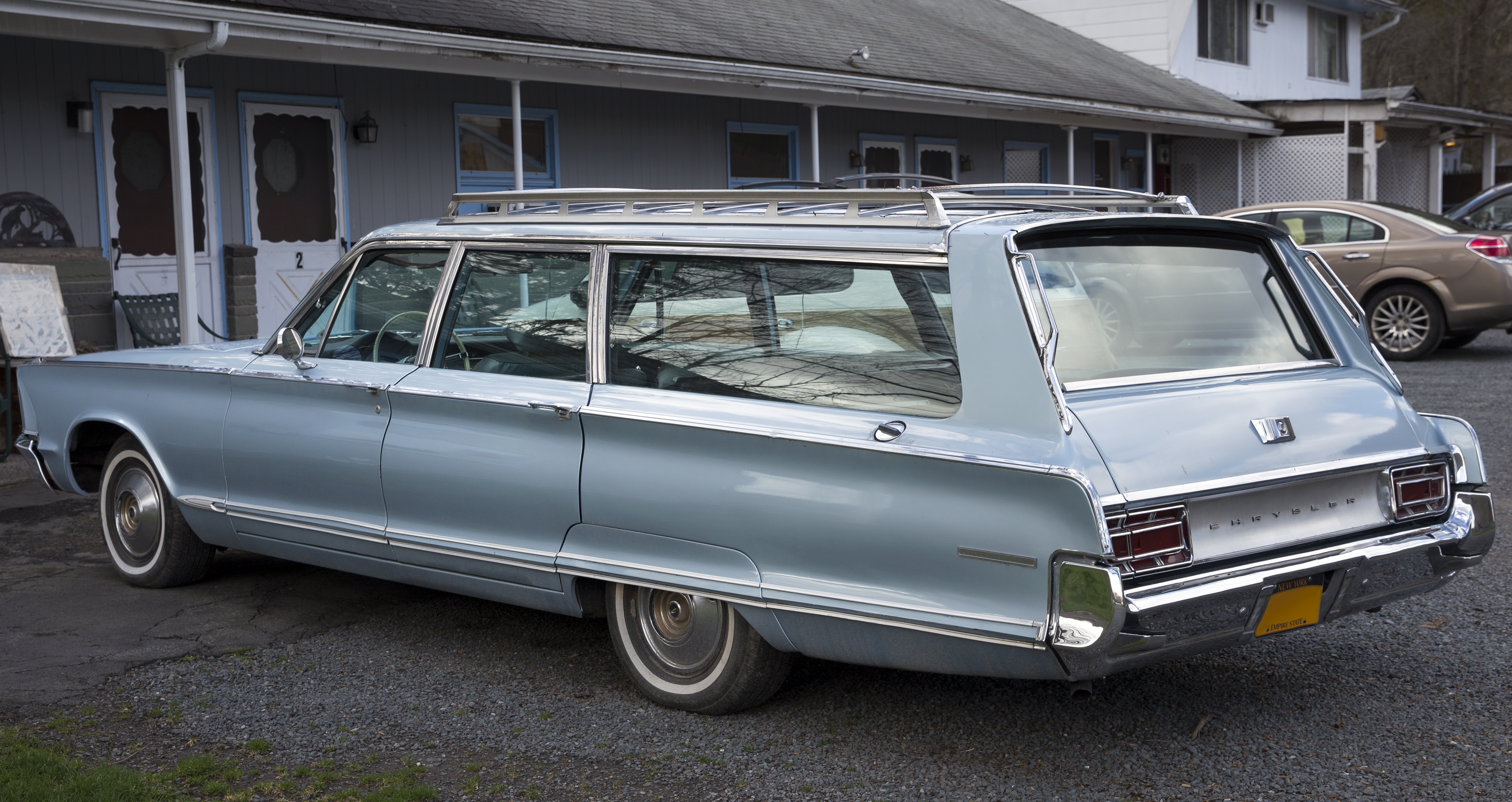
1966 Chrysler Town & Country (rear view)

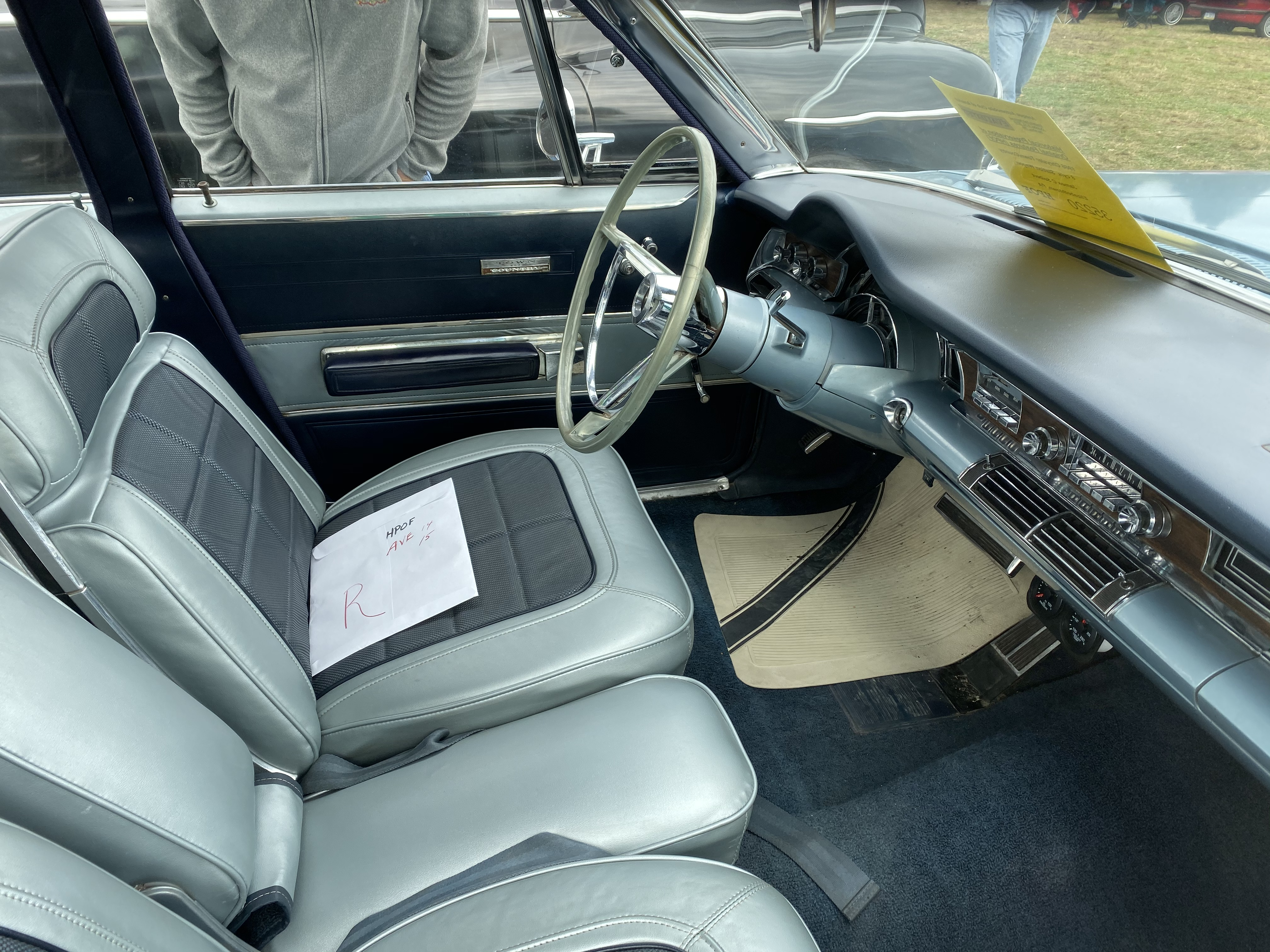
1966 Chrysler Town & Country station wagon interior

Automatic transmission-equipped cars dropped the dashboard shift control and converted to the new industry-standard PRNDL sequence shift lever, either column or floor mounted. Dodge and Chrysler models shared passenger compartment structures, and so interior dimensions were essentially identical. The Town & Country wagons shared the 121 in (3,073 mm) wheelbase and design with Plymouth and Dodge wagons, while other Chrysler body styles rode on a wheelbase 3 in (76 mm) longer. However, the wagons had the same overall length as sedans, at just under 220 in (5,588 mm). All Chrysler models and body styles, including the Town & Country, featured rear wheel opening skirts.

Thin pillars and tall glass shared with 4-door sedans made for generous space and outward visibility. Straight roof rails on the long roof rack had adjustable cross bars. All Newport models including wagons had a larger standard engine for 1965. The 3.375 inch stroke LB engine was bored to 4.25 inches, yielding 383 cubic inches. With a 2BBL carburetor and single exhaust, the regular fuel 383 produced 270 HP. A premium fuel 383 engine with 4BBL and dual exhausts producing 305 HP was an available option. New Yorker wagons continued to feature the 413 cubic inch 4BBL V8, Torqueflite automatic transmission, with power steering and power brakes as standard equipment. Both trim levels were available in six- or nine-passenger versions. However, this was the last year that wagons would be available in either New Yorker or Newport trim levels.

For 1966, Town & Country would become a model designation for the sole wagon in the Chrysler lineup. Exterior trim was similar to the Newport series, with unique taillights. The vinyl bench seat interior shared features with both the Newport and New Yorker series, with the front seat center armrest standard. The dashboard featured simulated woodgrain, resulting in a level of standard trim intermediate between the sedan series. Individual buckets with center armrest and passenger recliner from the New Yorker option list remained available for one more year. Chrysler's 2BBL regular fuel 383 V8 became the standard engine, with the 4BBL, dual exhaust, premium fuel 383 V8 available as an option, as on the Newport. Unlike the Newport, power steering, power brakes and Torqueflite automatic transmission were standard equipment. New in all Chryslers for 1966, the 3.75 inch stroke RB engine was bored to 4.32 inch yielding 440 cubic inches. With a 10.0:1 compression ratio, premium fuel, a 4-barrel carb and dual exhausts, the 440 cubic inch V8 produced 350 HP, and was the top power option for the Town & Country. Also available for the first time on all large Chryslers were front disc brakes, which required 15-inch wheels with unique wheel covers. With optional front discs, T&C wagons wore size 8.45×15 extra load range tires. With standard drum brakes, the tire size was 9.00×14.

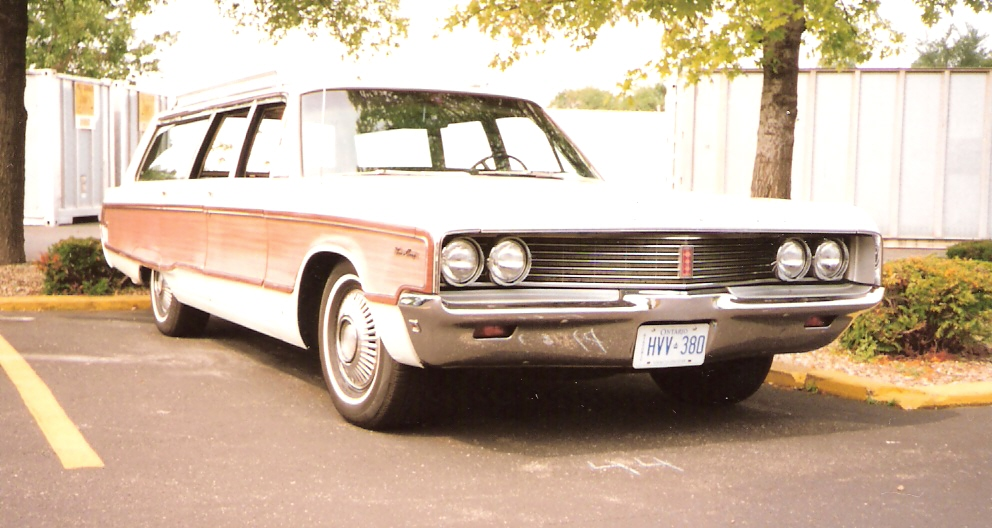
1968 Chrysler Town & Country

Exterior sheet metal for all large Chryslers was new for 1967, with a concave side cove being a key design element. Interiors were updated with a new instrument panel, perfectly symmetrical in shape and featuring an inverted fan style speedometer. Chassis dimensions and the greenhouses for 4-door sedans and wagons remained unchanged. A single Town & Country model in two- or three-seat versions was offered. The exterior trim matched the Newport series. Interior trim again split the difference between Newport and New Yorker, featuring a standard all-vinyl notchback bench seat with folding center armrest, and the New Yorker's simulated woodgrain applique on the dashboard. A new seating option was Chrysler's 50/50 3-in-1 split-bench seat, shared with the Newport Custom sedan. Standard and optional powertrains remained the same. Sales literature for 1967 showed front disc brakes as standard equipment on Town & Country, along with the requisite 15-inch wheels, 8.45×15 extra-load tires, and restyled "disc brake" wheel covers. However, many 1967 had 14-inch wheels and Newport wheel covers because they had drum brakes. These wagons were equipped with 8.85×14 tires.

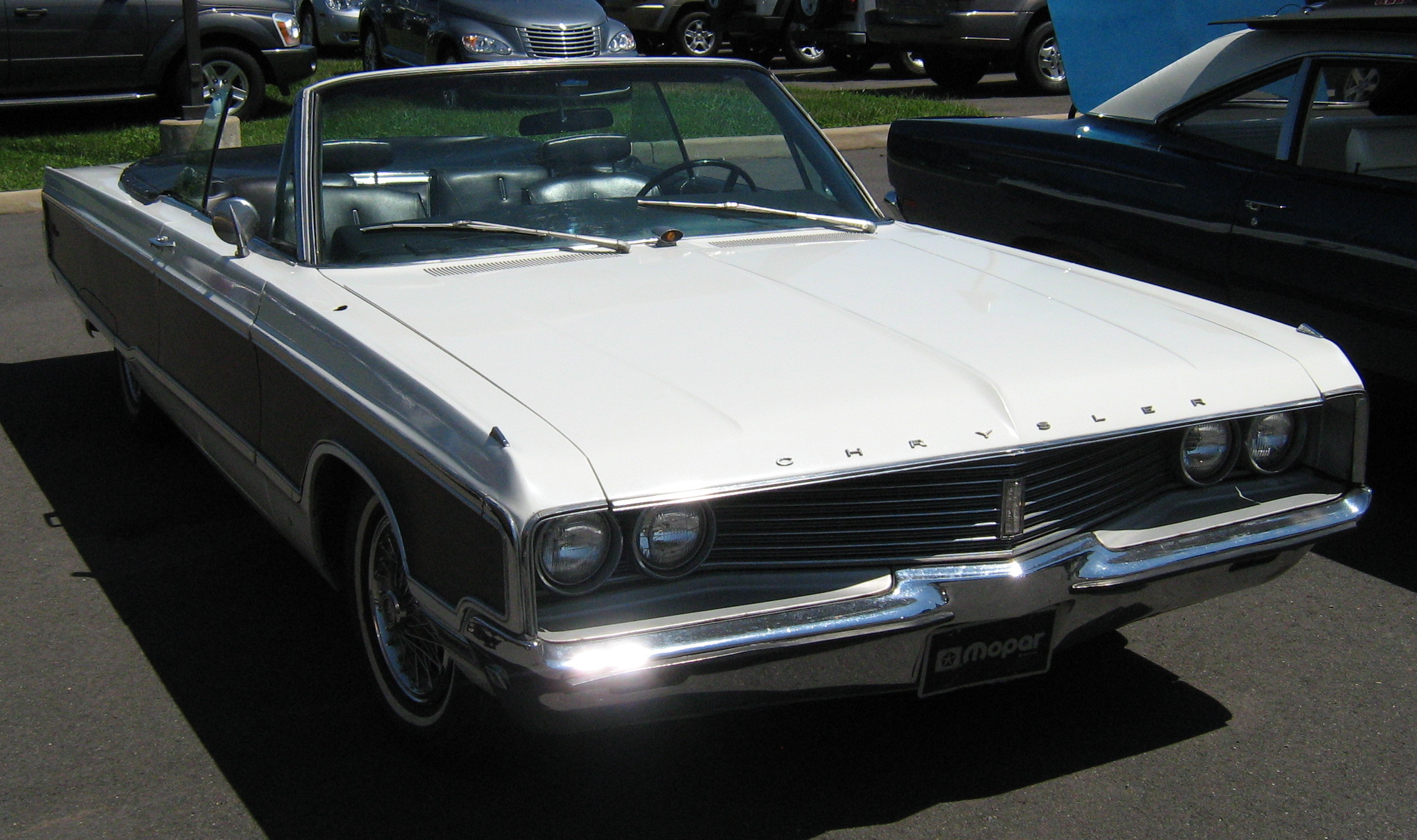
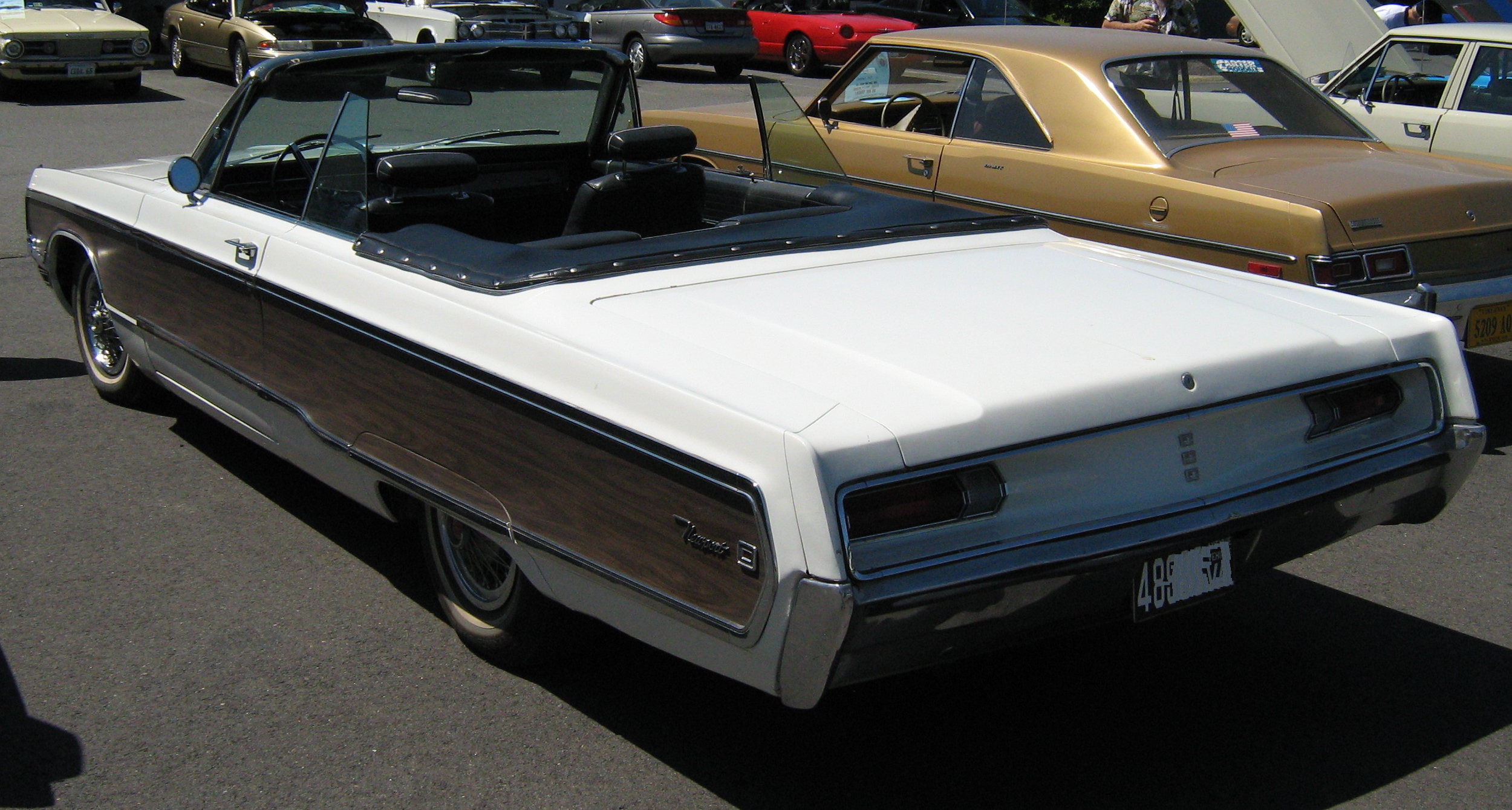
1968 Chrysler Town & Country convertible

For 1968, all new US cars were equipped with front and rear side marker lights. Chrysler bumpers, grille, hood, deck lid, rear fascia, and lamps all changed significantly, although side sheet metal, wagon tailgate, and rear lamps remained the same. Functionally, there were few changes. Better breathing cylinder heads boosted output of the standard 383 cu. in. 2BBL V8 to 290 HP. Front disc brakes returned to the options list, while front drum brakes and 8.85×14 tires were standard. Inside, standard notchback and optional 50/50 front seats continued, sharing seat and door trim patterns with the Newport Custom series. The most notable change in the Town & Country's appearance came in the form of simulated walnut grain paneling, filling the coved portion of the body sides and surrounded by a stainless steel molding. The wood paneling was standard on all Town & Country wagons, although an option without it was offered.

The original genuine wood of the Town & Country was available on coupes and convertibles as well as wagons. The simulated wood panels were offered as an option on 2-door Newport hardtops and convertibles for 1968 and 1969. The appearance was also offered on the Mercury Park Lane hardtop coupe and convertible, where it was known as "yacht deck paneling" and was also not as popular.

== 1969–1973 ==
Fifth generation
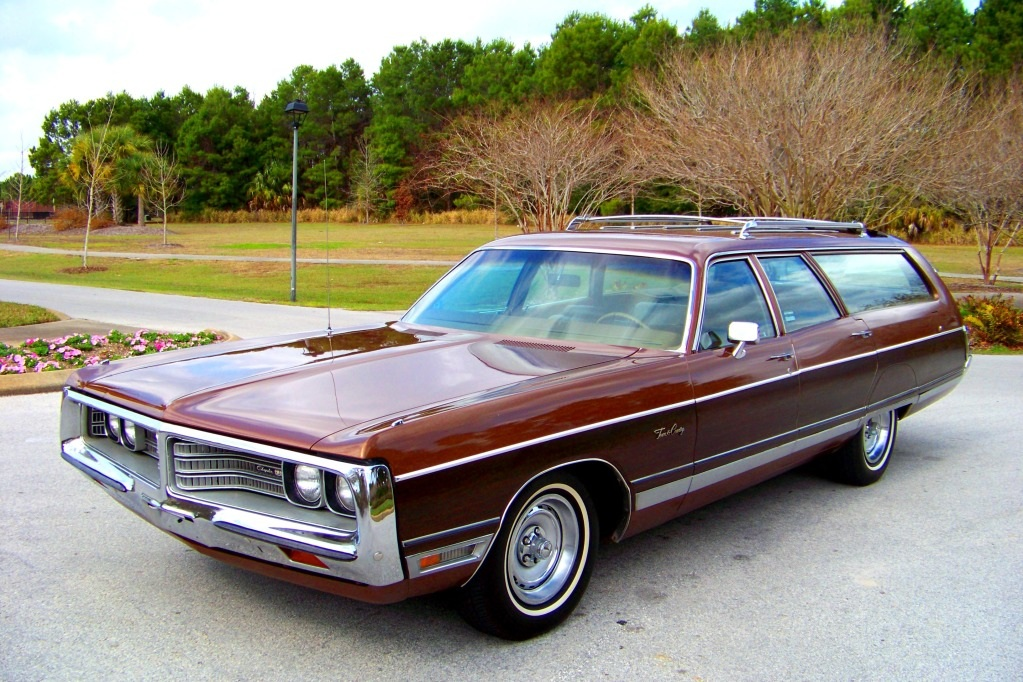
- 1972 Chrysler Town & Country 4-door wagon

Overview
- Production: 1968–1973
- Model years: 1969–1973
- Assembly: Detroit, Michigan (Jefferson Avenue Assembly); Belvidere, Illinois (Belvidere Assembly Plant)

Body and chassis
- Body style: 4-door wagon
- Layout: FR layout
- Platform: C-body
- Related: Imperial; Chrysler New Yorker; Chrysler Newport; Dodge Monaco; Dodge Polara; Plymouth Fury

Powertrain
- Engine: 383 cu in (6.3 L) RB V8; 440 cu in (7.2 L) RB V8
- Transmission: 3-speed A-727 automatic

Dimensions
- Wheelbase: 122 in (3,099 mm)
- Length: 225 in (5,715 mm)

For 1969, a major restyle brought a dramatic new look to all full-sized Chrysler cars. Called "fuselage design", it featured a pronounced side curvature from the rocker panels all the way to the roof rails. Plymouth and Dodge models, excluding wagons, shared passenger compartment structures and greenhouses riding on 120-inch and 122-inch wheelbases respectively. Similarly, Chrysler and Imperial models, excluding the Town & Country wagon, shared slightly longer passenger compartments and greenhouses, riding on 124-inch and 127-inch wheelbases respectively (all of the Imperial's longer wheelbase was in the front clip). As with the prior generation, all full-sized Chrysler wagons shared a common greenhouse on a unitized body and chassis with longitudinal front torsion bars, rear leaf springs, and Dodge's 122-inch wheelbase. As before, the wagon's shorter wheelbase was offset by the additional rear overhang. 1969 Town & Country wagons were nearly identical to other Chrysler body styles in overall length, at just under 225 inches. The 1969 Town & Country was US$5,279 ($46,347 in 2025 dollars); 24,516 were recorded to have been manufactured.

Fuselage-era Chryslers featured a full-width loop style chrome front bumper. Quad headlamps and grille were recessed inside the loop, with differing grille inserts for each series. Turn signal and parking lamps were recessed into the bumper below the headlamps. Body sides were simple and smooth, with a subtle character line originating at the front bumper, descending slightly for the length of the car, and ending at the wrap-around rear bumper. On Town & Country wagons, this character line was also the location of the lower molding surrounding the standard wood grain side paneling, simulated cherry for 1969. The fuselage profile extended the length of a full-sized "long roof", and made for a rather striking looking wagon. At the trailing edge of the long roof, body sides, D pillars, and a unique rooftop airfoil formed one continuous arch over the tailgate opening. The airfoil directed airflow from the roof down and over the tailgate window, intended to keep the glass clear of dirt accumulation.

The Town & Country's grille insert and wheel covers for this new generation were from the New Yorker, while front seating choices and interior trim were again drawn from the Newport Custom. The new instrument panel featured a symmetrical padded loop, echoing the design theme of the front end. The inverted fan style speedometer from 1967 and 1968 continued, balanced on the passenger side by a large glove box door. A unique Chrysler feature was floodlighting of the instruments and controls instead of more typical backlighting.

For 1969, all full-size Chrysler vehicles returned to standard 15-inch wheels. This accommodated the growing share of cars equipped with front disc brakes, which were updated to a simpler, less costly single-piston sliding caliper design from the earlier 4-piston fixed caliper type. Once again, Chrysler sales literature listed power front disc brakes as standard equipment on the Town & Country, although some were built with front drum brakes instead. Regardless of brake type, all T&Cs included standard size 8.85×15 tires on 6.5-inch x 15-inch heavy-duty rims. Powertrain choices for the Town & Country remained unchanged.

Chrysler played catch-up on some wagon specific features in 1969. The tailgate became a two-way door-gate, able to swing sideways or drop downward, a feature Ford had pioneered in 1965. The rear axle track was widened nearly three inches to 63.4 inches (1,610 mm), enabling a full 48.5 inches (1,230 mm) wide load floor between the wheel wells, a feature General Motors had also pioneered in 1965. Chrysler sought to leapfrog both of its competitors with a few station wagon exclusive features of its own, including passenger assist handles integrated into the rear opening trim molding, and a window washer contained entirely inside the tailgate.

Few changes were made for the 1970 model year. Most US automakers, including Chrysler, adopted bias-belted tires, a short-lived hybrid that combined familiar soft riding bias body plies with tread stabilizing belts used in European style radial tires. One well-known brand name at the time was Goodyear's Polyglas. All 1970 Chryslers featured standard bias-belted tires, with Town & Country wagons wearing size J78-15. The letter "J" identified the second largest size available in load capacity, while "78" indicated a cross-section height-to-width (or aspect ratio of 78%), and "15" indicated the nominal rim diameter in inches, as before.

A minor styling change found only on the Town & Country for 1970 and 1971 was the addition of a dogleg or kink in the lower body side character line on the rearward half of each rear door. Simulating a styling feature which had been seen on all 1967-1968 Chryslers (and which would return in 1974), this dogleg was simply a new shape for the woodgrain side trim, and involved no special sheet metal. It served to distinguish Chrysler wagons from Dodge and Plymouth models using the same body. Front disc brakes moved back to the options list one last time.

The late 1960s proved to be a financially challenging time for Chrysler Corporation, as tightening emissions standards and safety requirements spread the company's resources thin. Consequently, the biennial mid-cycle facelift originally intended for the company's 1971 lineup was postponed by a year. As a result, all 1971 Chryslers, including the Town & Country, looked virtually unchanged from the prior year. One interior change planned that did make it into the 1971 cars was the instrument panel surround, whose upper bolster became a bit larger, while the lower bolster was reduced in size, eliminating the lower ledge. The glove box door received a color-keyed overlay. Standard tires for the wagons were enlarged to L84×15, a size shared with the Imperial. Torsion Quiet Ride, unique to Chrysler and comprising a set of tuned rubber isolators for the front suspension sub-frame and rear leaf-spring mounts, was added to wagons. It had been introduced as a new feature for all other Chrysler models and body styles in 1970. Front disc brakes became standard equipment on the Town & Country.

Additional changes were related to federal emission standards and the requirement that 1971 cars run on unleaded regular-grade gasoline. Compression ratios on all engines were reduced to ~8.5:1. For this year, engine power and torque specifications were advertised as using both the familiar SAE gross rating method (for the last time) and SAE net rating method, which remains the standard today (net ratings are more representative of engine output as installed, since they measure output when the engine is fully "dressed" with production intake and exhaust plumbing, cooling system, and accessory loads in place). Revised ratings for Town & Country engines were 383 cu. in. 2-BBL V8: 75 (190 net) hp with 375 (305 net) lb-ft; 383 cu. In. 4-BBL V8: 300 (240 net) hp with 410 (310 net) lb-ft; 440 cu. In. 4-BBL: 335 (220 net) hp with 460 (350 net) lb-ft. Dual exhaust systems were no longer used.

The mid-cycle restyle originally intended for 1971 made its appearance for the 1972 model year. The overall design of Chrysler models remained very similar, and the uni-body platform and all key dimensions remained unchanged. The fuselage theme evolved toward an even simpler body side, still with a subtle rearward sloping character line, but with a squared off shoulder at the window sill. The front bumper retained its loop form, adding a center divider splitting the grille into halves. Greenhouses for all four-door models remained unchanged, while two-door coupe rooflines became more formal, and convertibles were dropped from the lineup. After many years of declining sales, the 300 series was eliminated, replaced by a New Yorker Brougham series with plusher interior choices and more standard equipment, slotted between the Imperial and New Yorker.

For 1972, the Town & Country borrowed most of its exterior trim from the New Yorker. Die-cast grille inserts were shared with the New Yorker, and rear-wheel openings once again wore fender skirts. Brushed bright metal moldings about two inches wide ran the length of the car from the front bumper to rear, and served as the lower border for the standard simulated wood grain side panels. Standard wheel covers were shared with the Newport and were identical to the 1969 wheel covers, then shared with the New Yorker. Inside, the front seating choices and door trim were again shared with the Newport Custom. Seatbacks for the standard notch-back front seat featured a high back design with integrated headrests. Chrysler's two-way door-gate became a three-way, able to open as door with the glass up.

Unfortunately, as the Town & Country (and most cars during the 1970s) grew heavier, available powertrain choices became fewer and weaker. Compression ratios were further reduced to 8.2:1. An increase in bore from 4.25 inches in the 383 to 4.34 inches produced a new LB series engine displacement of 400 cu. in. With a 2-BBL carburetor, it just matched the 190 net horsepower and 310 lb⋅ft (420 N⋅m) net torque ratings of the prior year 383s. The only remaining optional engine was the 440 cu. in. 4-BBL V8 producing 215 net horsepower and 345 lb⋅ft (468 N⋅m) net torque. Even so, the updated Town & Country, with its more imposing grille and well integrated fender skirts, set sales records, with 6,473 six-passenger and 14,116 nine-passenger wagons produced for 1972.

1973 was the fifth and final year of what had been planned as a four-year platform cycle. A federal mandate to equip 1973 cars with bumpers that could absorb up to 5 mph (8.0 km/h) impacts with no functional damage was a challenge, since the large cars that Chrysler had designed to comply with this standard were delayed until the 1974 model year. The stopgap solution was to replace the fuselage-era signature loop front bumpers with a generic grille and more conventional bumpers wearing large black rubber impact absorbers, front and rear. The absorbers added more than 5 in (127 mm) to the overall length of the cars. Apart from 5 mph (8.0 km/h) bumpers, other changes for the 1973 Town & Country were few: the 50/50 3-in-1 front seat had proven sufficiently popular that it became standard equipment, as did the higher torque 440 cu. in. V8 engine, which featured a standard electronic ignition for the first time.

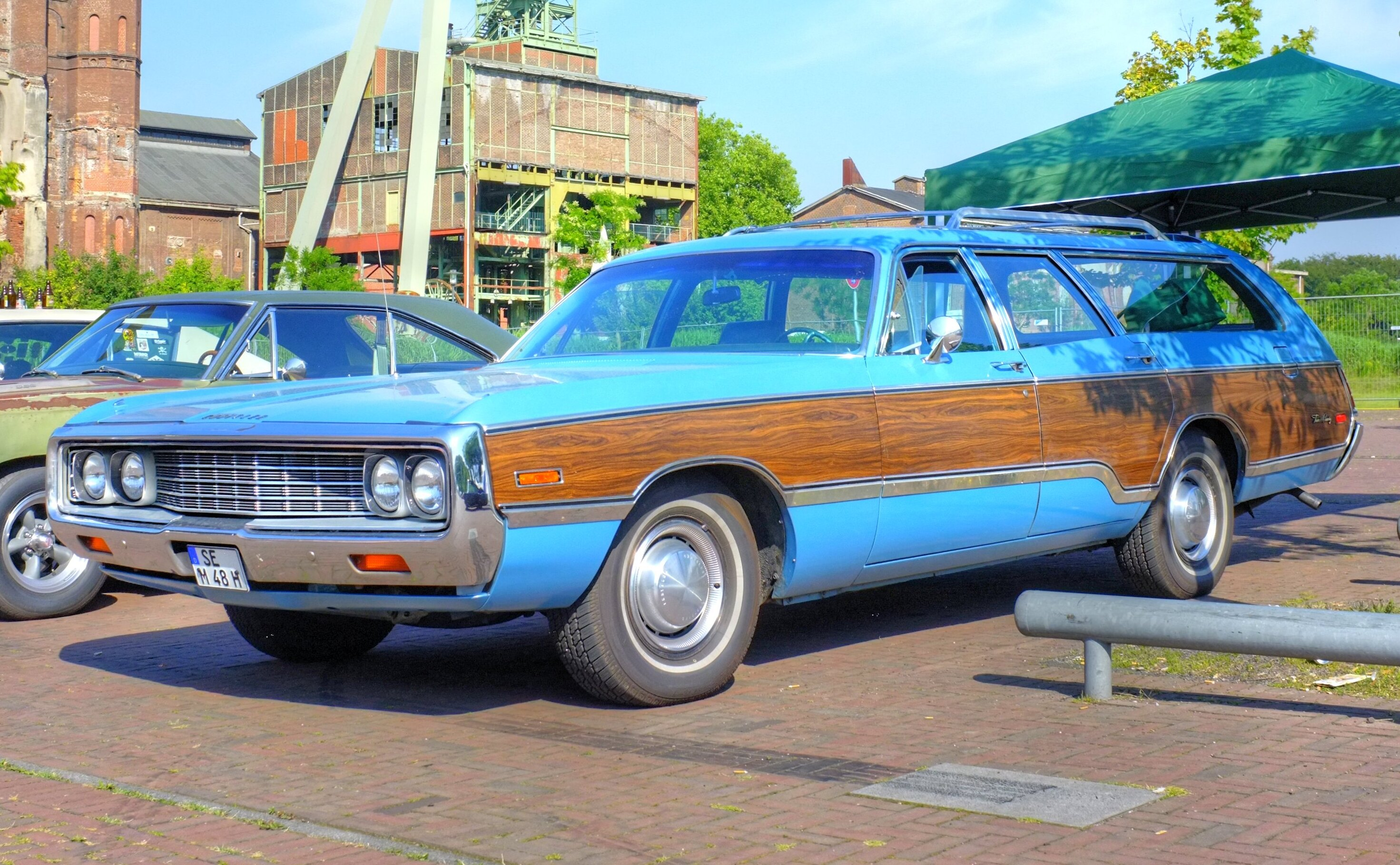
1970 Chrysler Town & Country Wagon

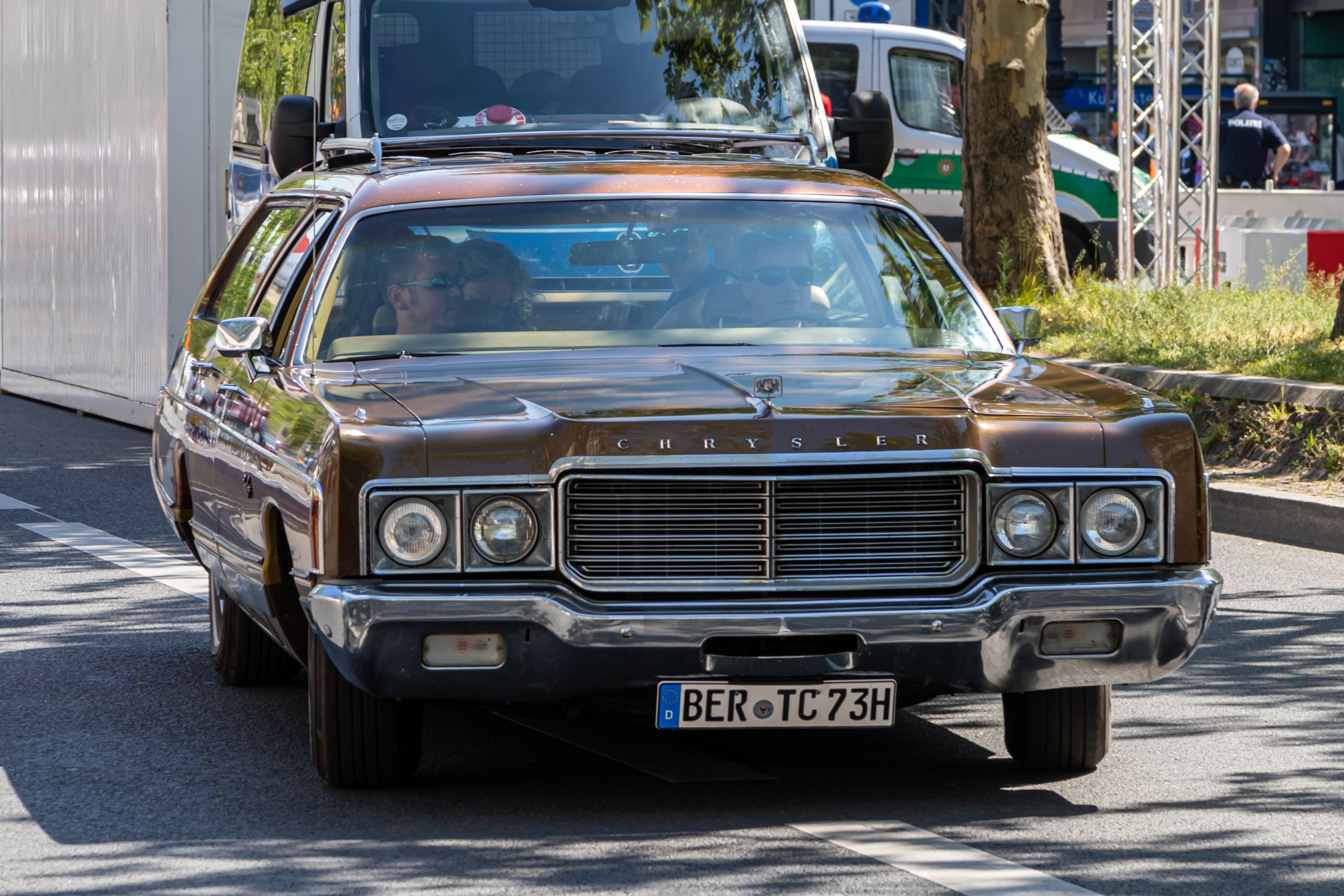
1973 Chrysler Town & Country Station Wagon

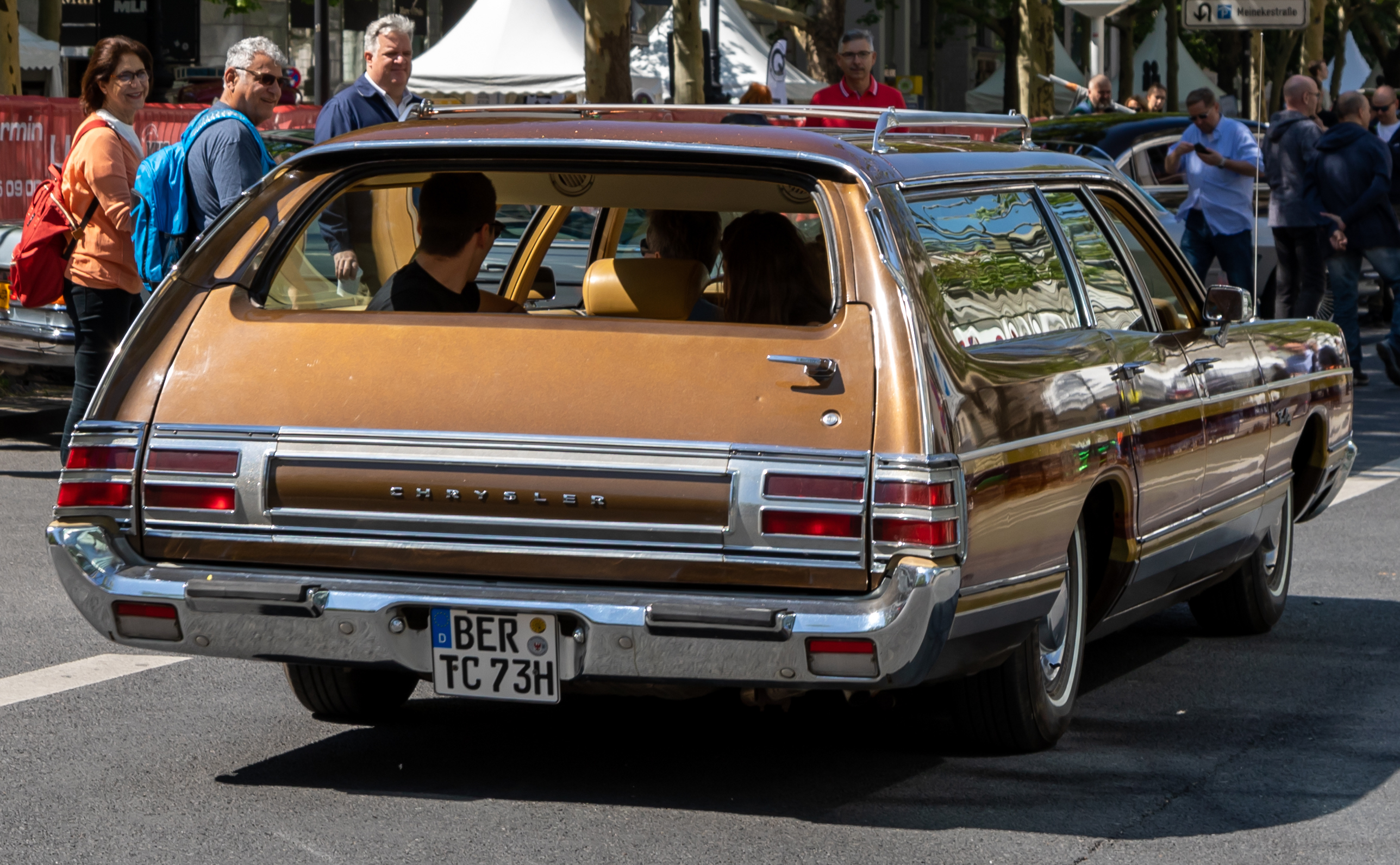
1973 Town & Country (rear view)

== 1974–1977 ==
Sixth generation
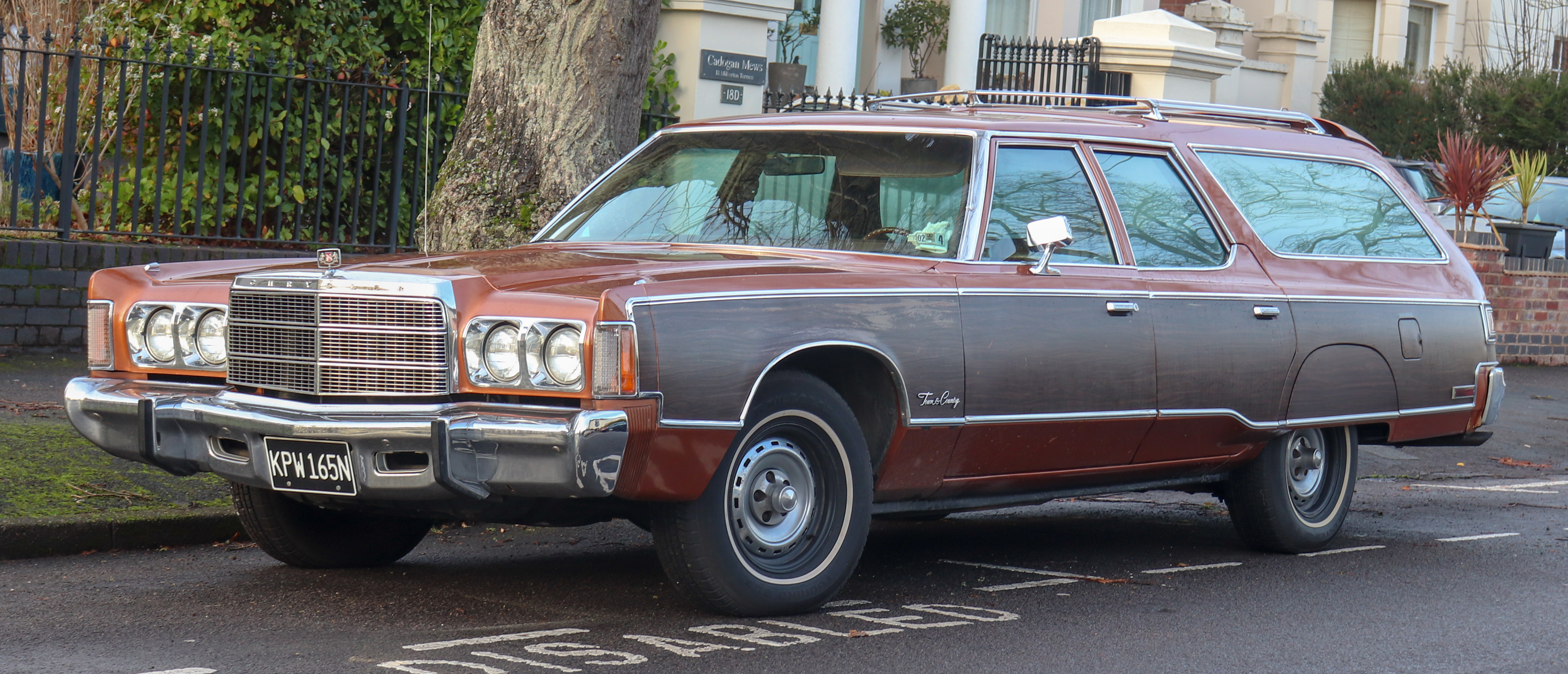

Overview
- Production: 1973–1977
- Model years: 1974–1977
- Assembly: Detroit, Michigan (Jefferson Avenue Assembly); Belvidere, Illinois (Belvidere Assembly Plant)

Body and chassis
- Body style: 4-door wagon
- Layout: FR layout
- Platform: C-body
- Related: Imperial; Chrysler New Yorker; Chrysler Newport; Plymouth Gran Fury; Plymouth Fury; Dodge Monaco

Powertrain
- Engine: 440 cu in (7.2 L) Wedge V8; 400 cu in (6.6 L) Wedge V8

Dimensions
- Wheelbase: 124 in (3,150 mm)
- Length: 227.2 in (5,771 mm)

For the 1974 model year, Chrysler introduced its new large car lineup that was originally planned for the previous year. The timing proved to be unfortunate, as the Arab oil embargo of late 1973 had Americans waiting in line for gasoline coast to coast, sometimes for hours. Big cars quickly became a glut on the market, despite the fact that Chrysler's new models were some of the best large cars the company had produced in years. The new styling was a clear departure from the fuselage generation, and appeared to share proportions and design cues from General Motors' 1971 large car redesign. The body sides had a more pronounced tumble home. A-pillars were thin, and beltlines were lower, yielding significantly more glass area. Energy-absorbing bumpers were integrated into the designs, front and rear. The 1975 nine-passenger Town & Country station wagon was US$8,099 ($88,142 in 2025 dollars); 4,764 were recorded to have been manufactured.

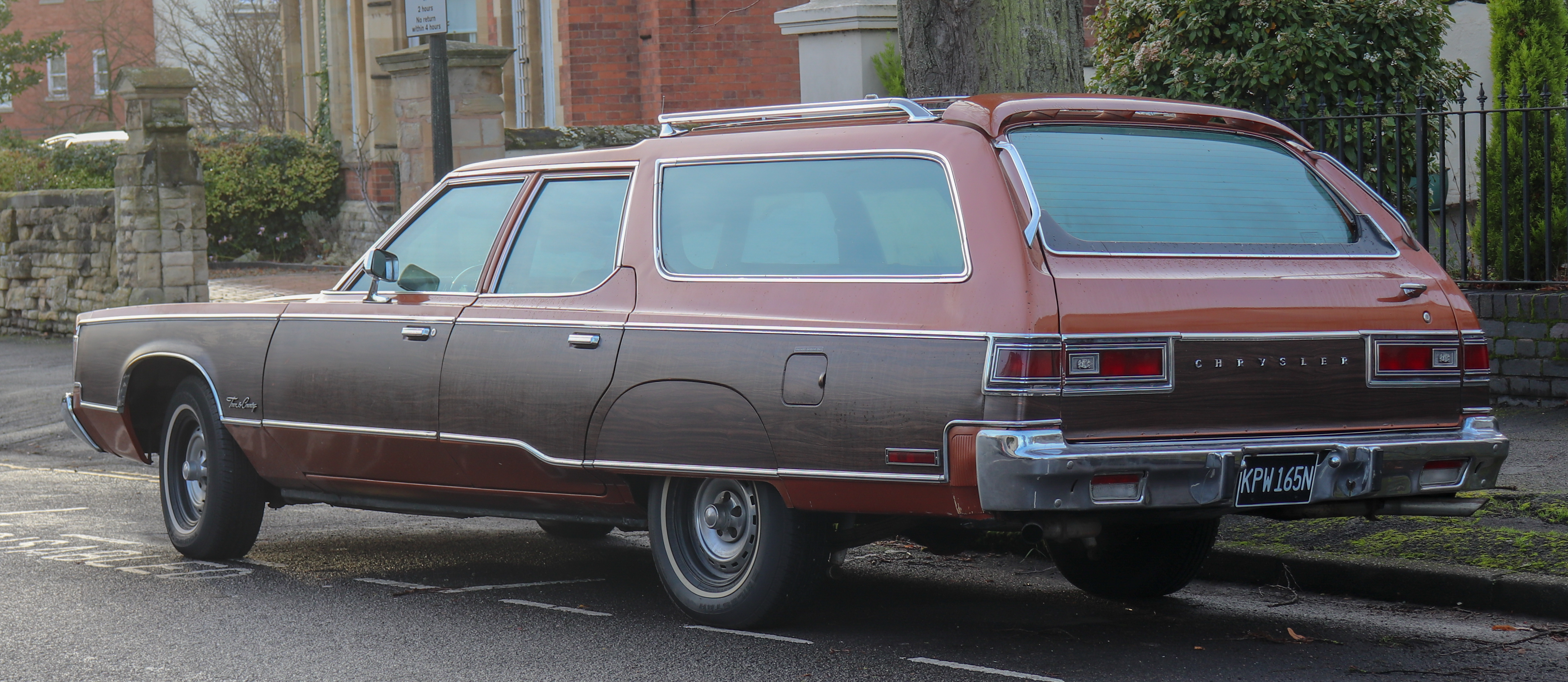
Rear view

For this generation, full-sized Plymouths and Dodges, excluding wagons, shared more than just body shells. They also shared a common 122-inch wheelbase, instrument panels, and most exterior body stampings. Likewise, Chrysler and Imperial models shared slightly longer body shells on a common 124-inch wheelbase, as well as instrument panels and exterior body stampings. Once again, Chrysler's wagons would share a common greenhouse across all of its divisions, although this time all wagons would roll on the longer Chrysler 124-inch wheelbase. All remained large enough to swallow the ubiquitous 4×8 sheet of plywood flat on its floor with the three-way door-gate closed, with no evidence of any attempt to follow GM's clamshell-style rear closure. The roof was slightly elevated aft of the C-pillar, and a body-colored air deflector at the trailing edge remained a standard feature, although it was no longer integrated into the body structure. Fully skirted rear wheel openings and simulated woodgrain side and doorgate panel appliqués remained standard equipment on all Town & Country wagons.

A significant safety improvement was achieved with the relocation of the fuel tank from the left rear quarter (where it had been located since the 1950s) to under the floor, just behind the rear axle. Underfloor storage space was reduced on 2-seat wagons, but revisions in the third seat folding mechanism minimized any compromises in seating utility. Space freed up in the left rear quarter panel became a lockable storage compartment.

Although the overall size of 1974 Chryslers was barely larger than the fuselage generation that preceded it, the overall weight continued to increase. Additional emission controls, safety features, and growing standard equipment lists were having the same effect on every automaker. The 3-seat Town & Country now weighed just under 5,000 pounds, about 300 pounds heavier than its 1972 fuselage generation counterpart. With air conditioning, and a typical complement of power assists, the average 1974 T&C weighed about 5,200 pounds. Standard tires were L78×15 bias belted on 6.5×15-inch rims. Steel-belted radials were optional.

Changes were few for 1975, and most were shared across the entire US auto industry, including Chrysler. The lower rolling resistance radial-ply tires became standard equipment, in size LR78×15 for the Town & Country. All Chryslers were equipped with an exhaust system catalytic converter for the first time, which required unleaded gasoline to run properly. The 400 cu.in. 2BBL V8 engine returned as a fuel economy alternative to the still-standard 440 engine. As a minor appearance upgrade for all Chrysler models, lower instrument panels, steering columns, and steering wheels became color-coordinated, in departure from the previous black finish.

1975 was a year of product line consolidation for Chrysler. Imperial, no longer a separate model but a highly trimmed Chrysler, was discontinued, as it could not compete effectively with Cadillac, Lincoln, or premium European brands. The Imperial's unique trim, with waterfall grille, concealed headlamps, extended rear fenders, vertical tail lamps, and "lose pillow" upholstery seating, became the 1976 New Yorker Brougham. Similarly, what had been New Yorker interior and exterior trim became the 1976 Newport Custom. The Town & Country continued unchanged inside and out. It remained as large and well-equipped as ever, but the market's interest in giant luxury station wagons was waning.

1977 would be the last year of the Town & Country as a traditional full-sized American premium station wagon. Additionally, the 1977 Town & Country, like the full-size Plymouth and Dodge wagons, was not sold in California or high-altitude regions due to emissions regulations. Both GM and Ford would downsize and continue with traditional big wagons, with Ford doing so through 1991 and GM until 1996. At Chrysler, however, the C-body's replacement, the R-body, would only be offered as a four-door sedan, and the Town & Country moniker would take on new roles in new market segments.

== 1978–1981 ==
Seventh generation
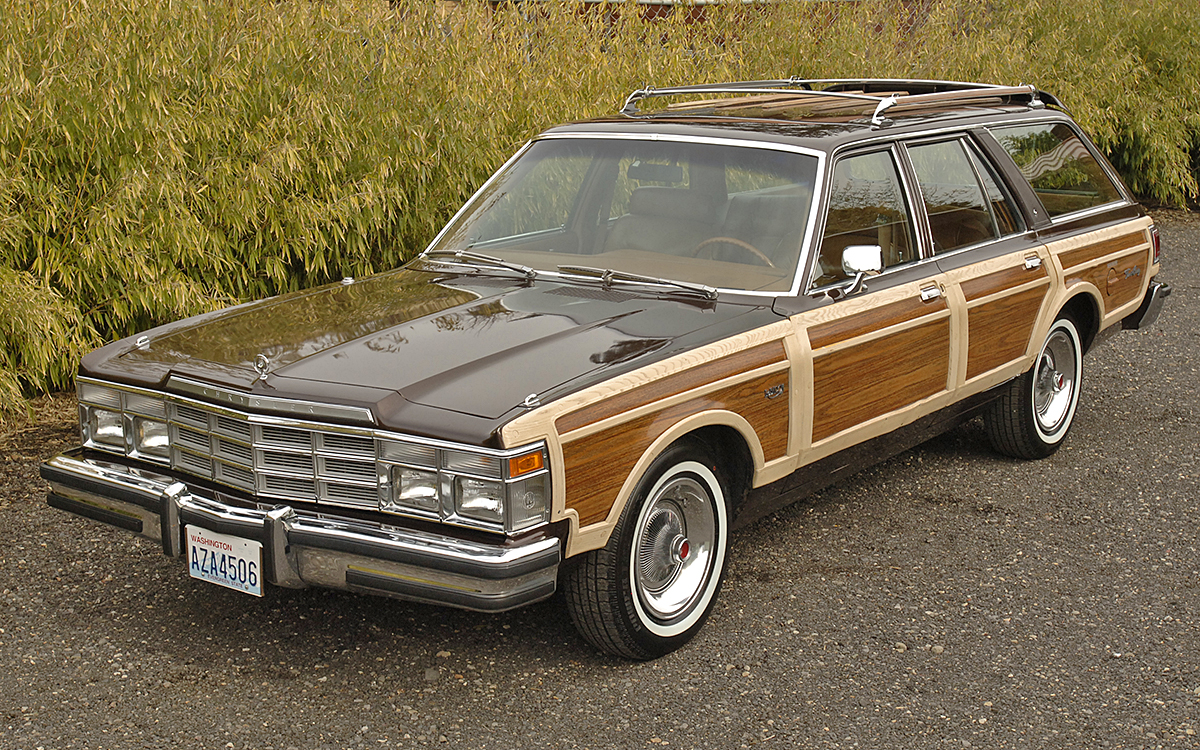

Overview
- Production: 1977–1981
- Model years: 1978–1981
- Assembly: Newark, Delaware; St. Louis, Missouri

Body and chassis
- Body style: 4-door wagon
- Layout: FR layout
- Platform: M-body
- Related: Chrysler New Yorker; Dodge Diplomat; Plymouth Caravelle; Dodge Aspen; Plymouth Volare

Powertrain
- Engine: 225 cu in (3.7 L) Slant-6; 318 cu in (5.2 L) LA 318 V8; 360 cu in (5.9 L) LA 360 V8

Dimensions
- Wheelbase: 112.7 in (2,863 mm)
- Length: 205.5 in (5,220 mm)
- Width: 74.2 in (1,885 mm)
- Height: 55.5 in (1,410 mm)

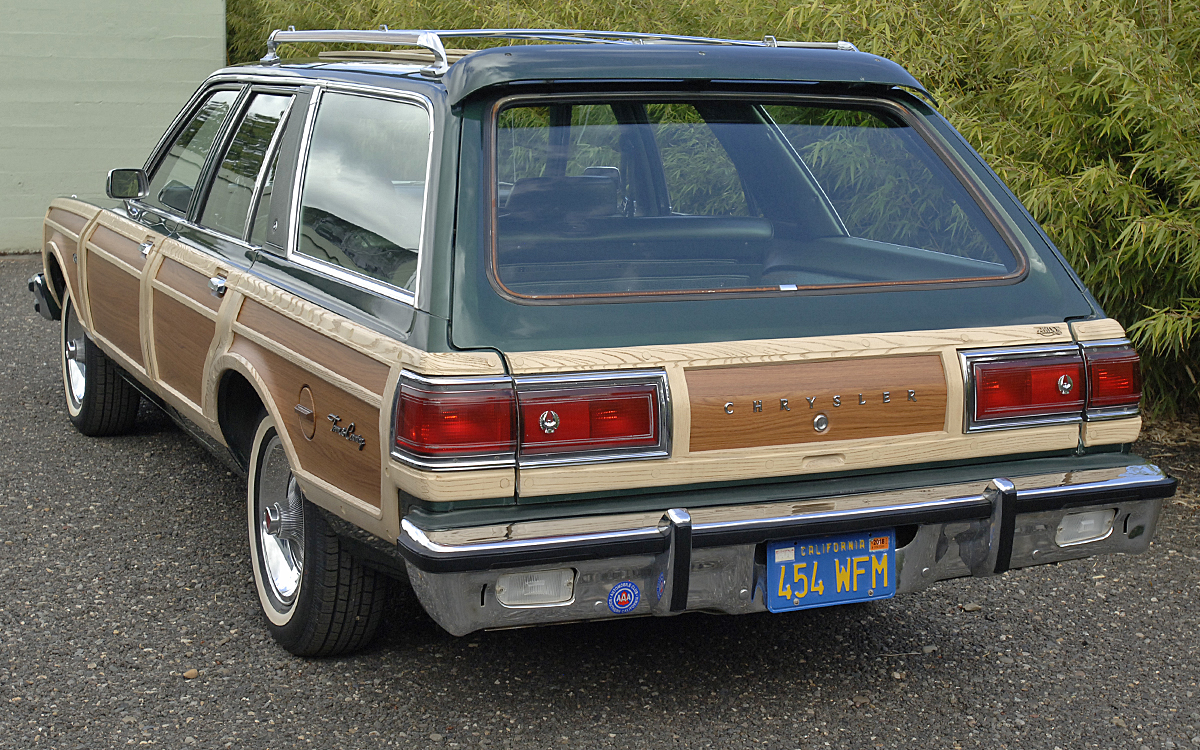
1978 Chrysler LeBaron Town & Country, rear view

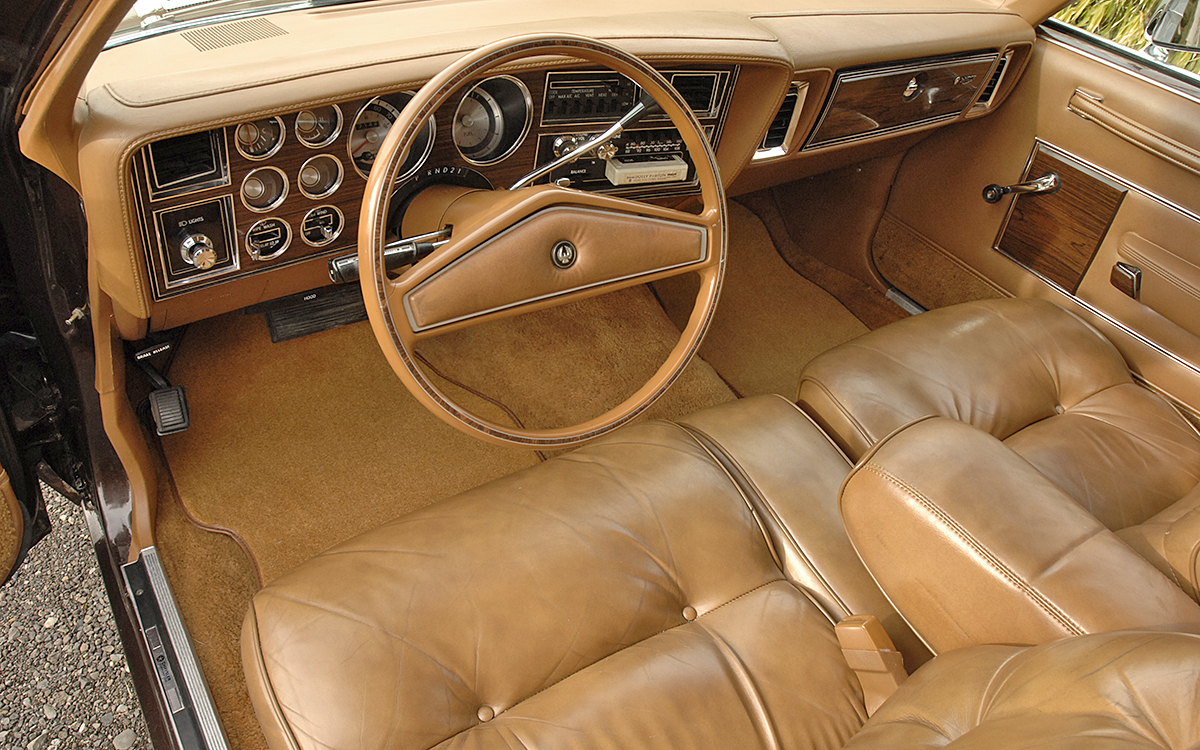
1978 Chrysler LeBaron Town & Country interior

From 1978 through 1981, the Town & Country nameplate designated the simulated wood-trimmed wagon model of the mid-sized Chrysler LeBaron series, built on the Chrysler M platform, which included the Plymouth Gran Fury, Dodge Diplomat, and LeBaron. Although it was trimmed more elegantly inside and out, there were not many substantial differences in the chassis and powertrain, between Chrysler's downsized intermediate line-up and its compact rear wheel drive Dodge Aspen/Plymouth Volare models introduced in 1976. Wheelbases, tread width, and interior dimensions were identical, leaving only front/rear overhangs and overall length to differentiate mid-sized from the compact.

== 1982–1988 ==
Eighth generation
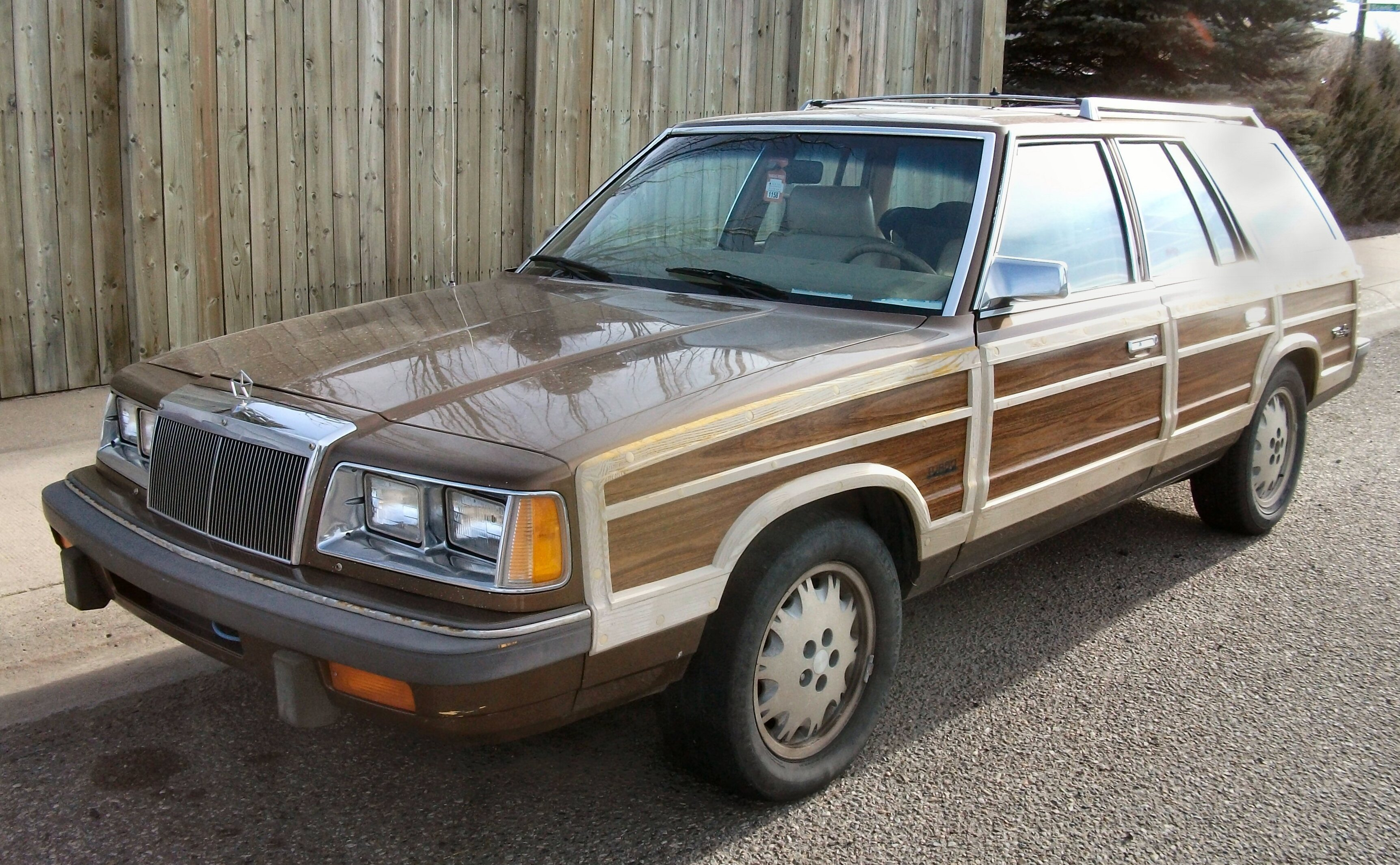

Overview
- Production: 1981–1988
- Model years: 1982–1988
- Assembly: Newark, Delaware (wagon); St. Louis, Missouri (convertibles)

Body and chassis
- Body style: 4-door wagon (1982–1988); 2-door convertible (1983–1986)
- Layout: FF layout
- Platform: K-body
- Related: Chrysler LeBaron; Dodge 400; Plymouth Reliant; Dodge Aries

Powertrain
- Engine: 2.2 L K I4; 2.2 L Turbo I I4; 2.5 L K I4; 2.6 L Mitsubishi G54B I4
- Transmission: 3-speed automatic

Dimensions
- Wheelbase: 100.4 in (2,550 mm)
- Length: 179.0 in (4,547 mm)
- Width: 68.0 in (1,727 mm)
- Height: 53.2 in (1,351 mm)

For model years 1982 through 1988, the Town & Country name was featured on the wagon version of the K-body-based front wheel drive LeBaron, featuring simulated woodgrain exterior trim. A limited production convertible version was manufactured from model years 1983 to 1986, and also featured simulated woodgrain paneling. It was meant to reflect the classic look of original 1940s and early 1950s convertibles, and came standard with Mark Cross leather interior.

Chrysler's K-body platform models, including the LeBaron-based Town & Countries, were eventually phased out by the late 1980s. The Town & Country name was briefly absent from the start of the 1989 model year, but returned for 1990 on a new luxury Chrysler Town & Country minivan. Like most Town & Country models of the past, the new minivan also featured woodgrain exterior trim.

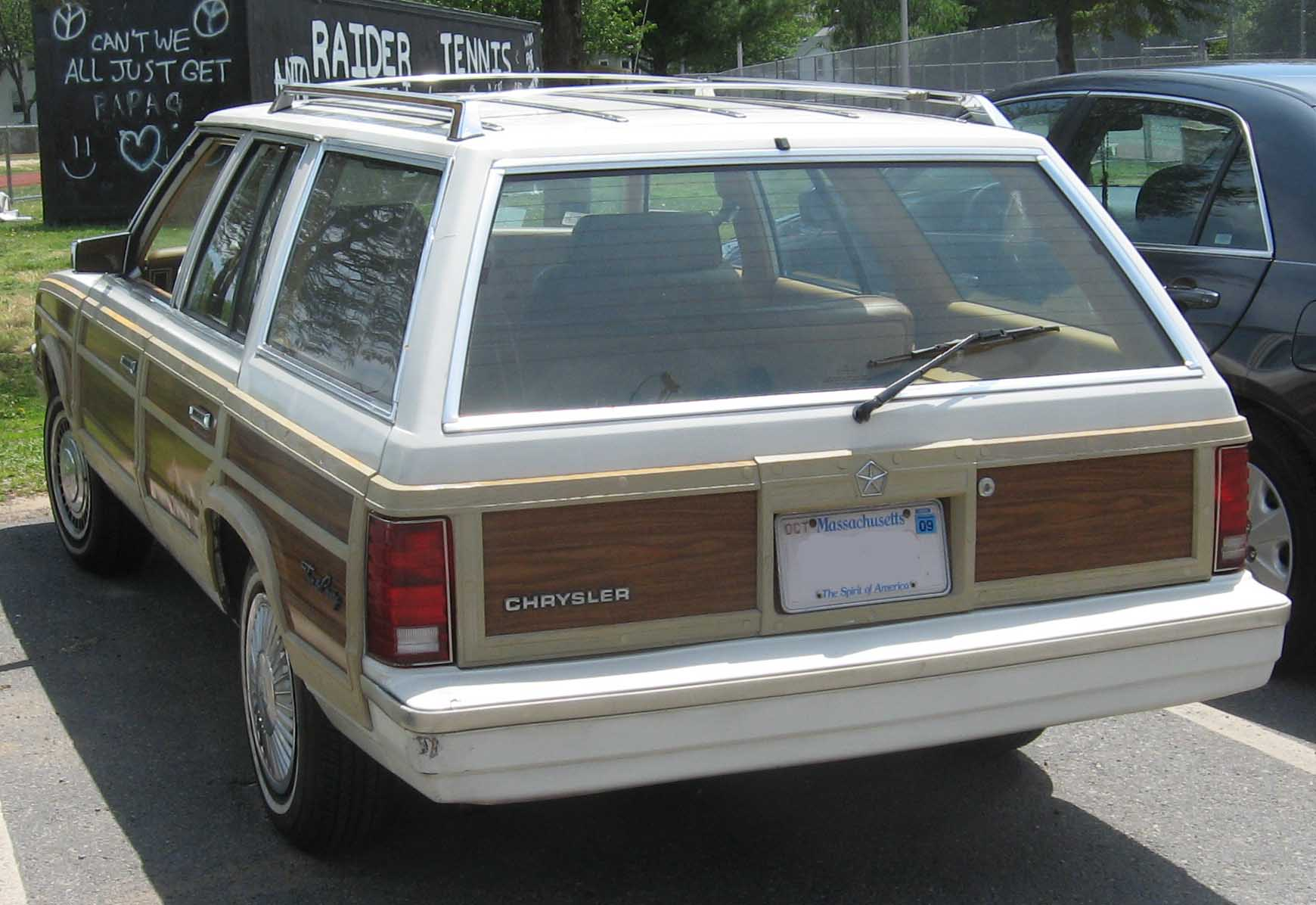
Town & Country wagon

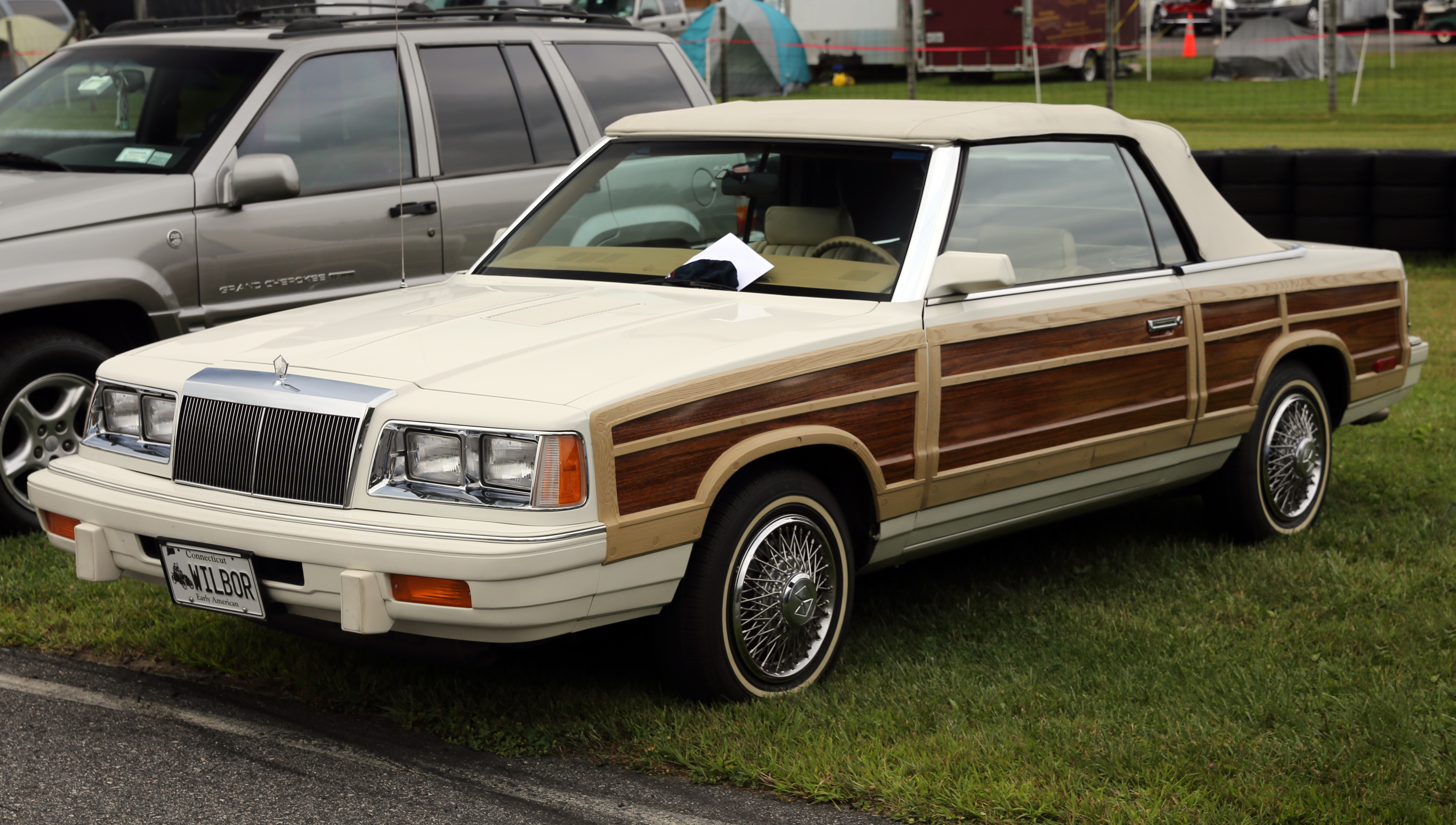
Town & Country convertible

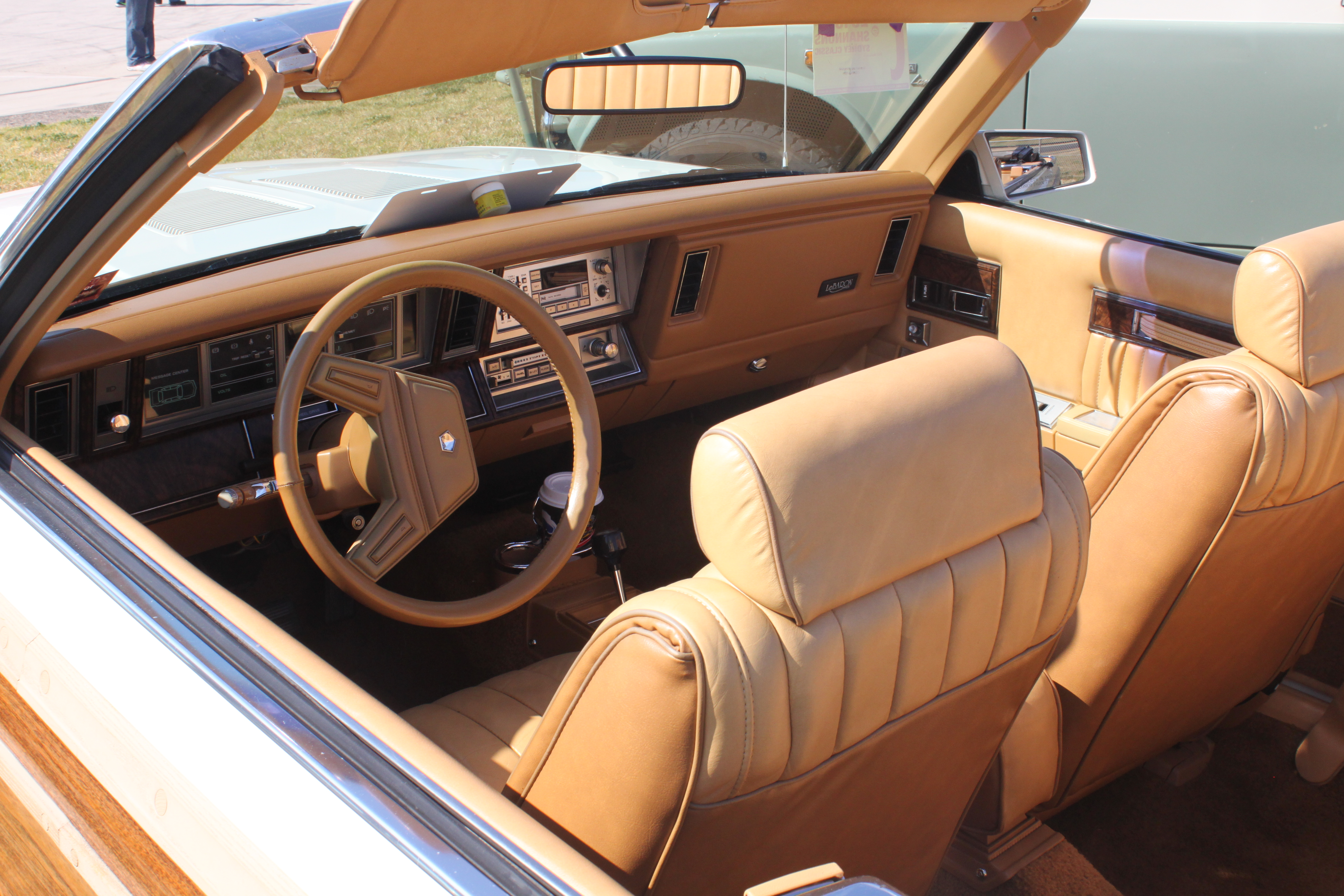
Town & Country convertible interior

== 1990–2016 ==
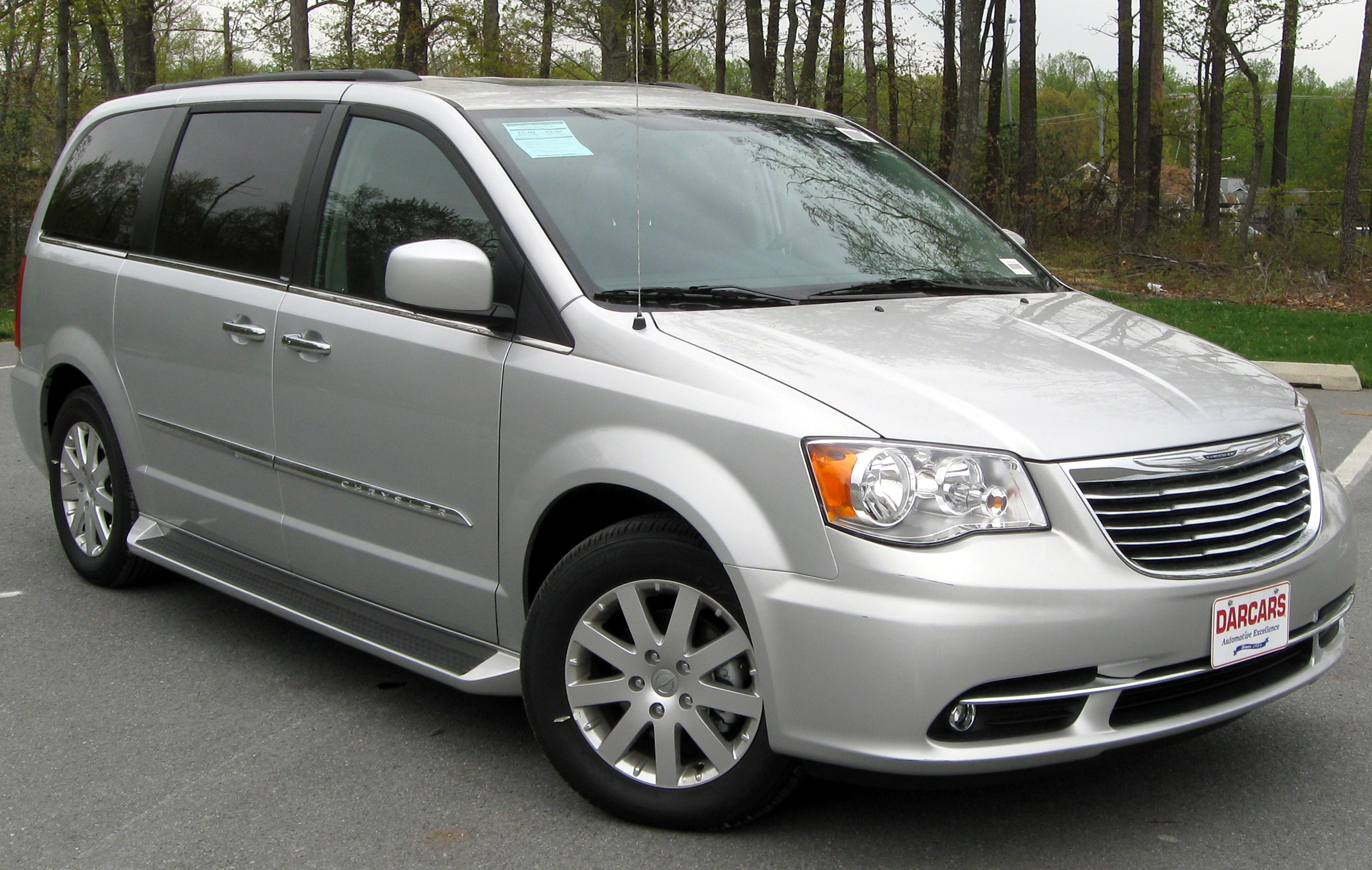
2011 Chrysler Town & Country

Initially planned for the 1989 model year, the Chrysler Town & Country returned in the spring of 1989 as an early 1990 model year introduction. This time, however, it became part of the new Town & Country luxury minivan lineup, which was based on the Dodge Grand Caravan and Plymouth Grand Voyager minivans (each of which had been added to Chrysler's corporate minivan lineup during the start of the 1987 model year as long-wheelbase/extended-length versions of their standard-wheelbase/standard-length Dodge Caravan and Plymouth Voyager minivan cousins). It was redesigned for the 1991, 1996, 2001, and 2008 model years, with each generation adding new technology and with numerous industry firsts.
