= Chrysler Saratoga =

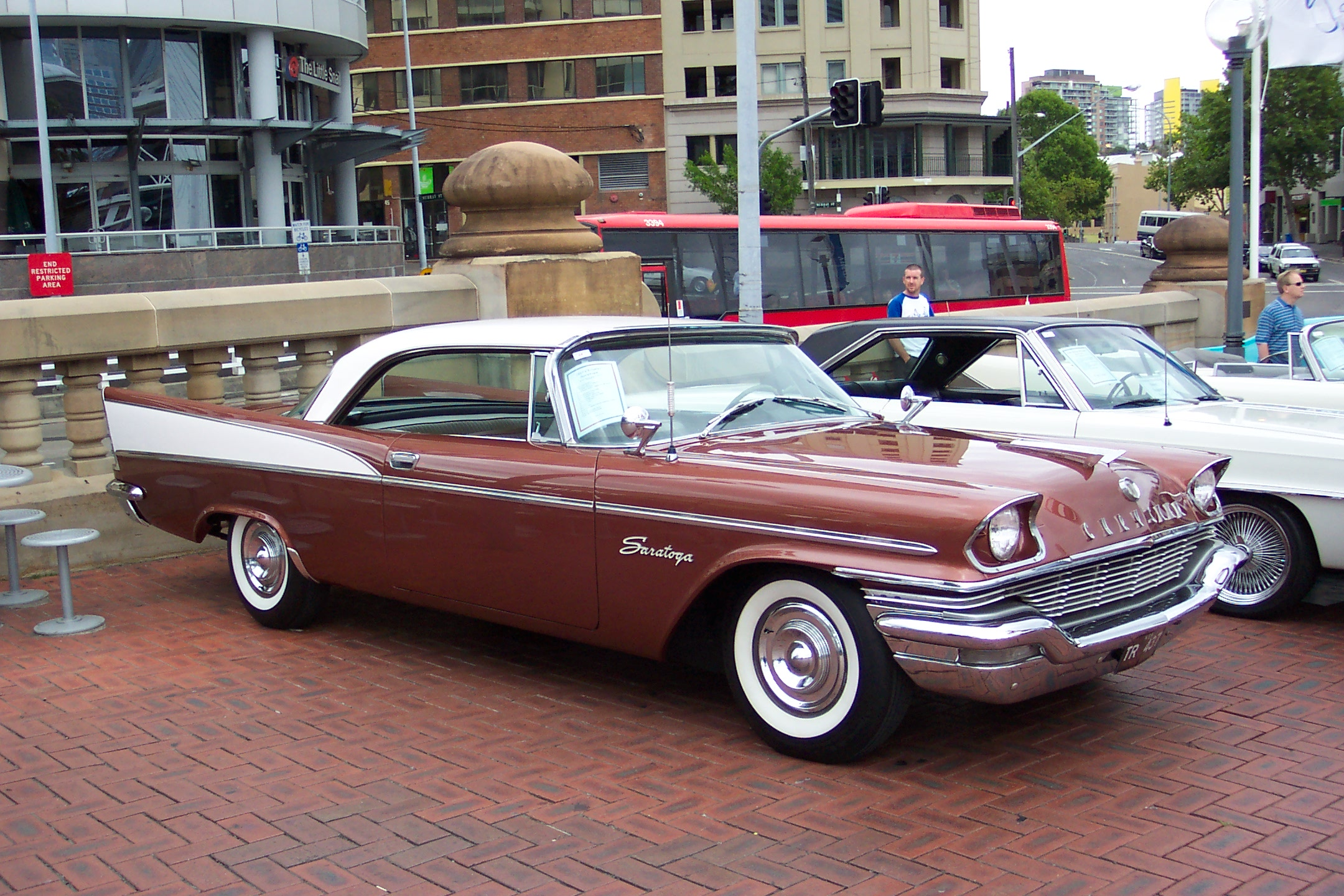
- 1957 Chrysler Saratoga 2-Door Hardtop

Overview
- Manufacturer: Chrysler
- Also called: Chrysler Saratoga 300 (Canada)
- Production: 1939–1942; 1946–1952; 1957–1965; 1989–1995 (Europe)

Body and chassis
- Class: Full-size car
- Body style: 2-door coupe 4-door sedan

Chronology
- Predecessor: Chrysler Eight
- Successor: Chrysler 300

The Chrysler Saratoga is an automobile built by Chrysler. The nameplate was used from 1939 to 1952 and from 1957 to 1960 in the U.S. market, in Canada through 1965, and in Europe from 1989 to 1995. In the beginning, it was introduced as a sport luxury model, using the Straight Eight engine from the Chrysler New Yorker which was more formal, and the Imperial which had graduated to special order limousine.

The Saratoga was introduced one year after the luxurious New Yorker and was well equipped, wearing the Chrysler nameplate. It was initially more expensive than the New Yorker, then marketing changes repositioned the Saratoga more modestly as the Imperial took the top of the Chrysler hierarchy followed by the New Yorker. Items that were standard equipment such as power windows, power locks, power steering, power brakes, power adjustable front seat and air conditioning on the New Yorker were initially available on the Saratoga, then as years progressed became standard on the Saratoga.

As it maintained its high performance image for Chrysler, it was used to introduce the 331 cu in (5.4 L) overhead valve Hemi V8 in 1951. It was discontinued in 1953 initially when the New Yorker, and, later the 1955 Chrysler 300 took over as the performance models. It was reintroduced from 1957 until 1965 as a junior model to the Chrysler 300 and was available as a sedan and priced lower. In 1989, the nameplate was reused only in Europe as a rebadged Dodge Spirit available with a 3.0 V6 and a 5-speed manual transmission until 1995.

It was named for Saratoga Springs, New York, and is home to the Saratoga Race Course, a thoroughbred horse racing track.

== 1939–1942 ==
First Generation (Series C-23/C-26/C-30)
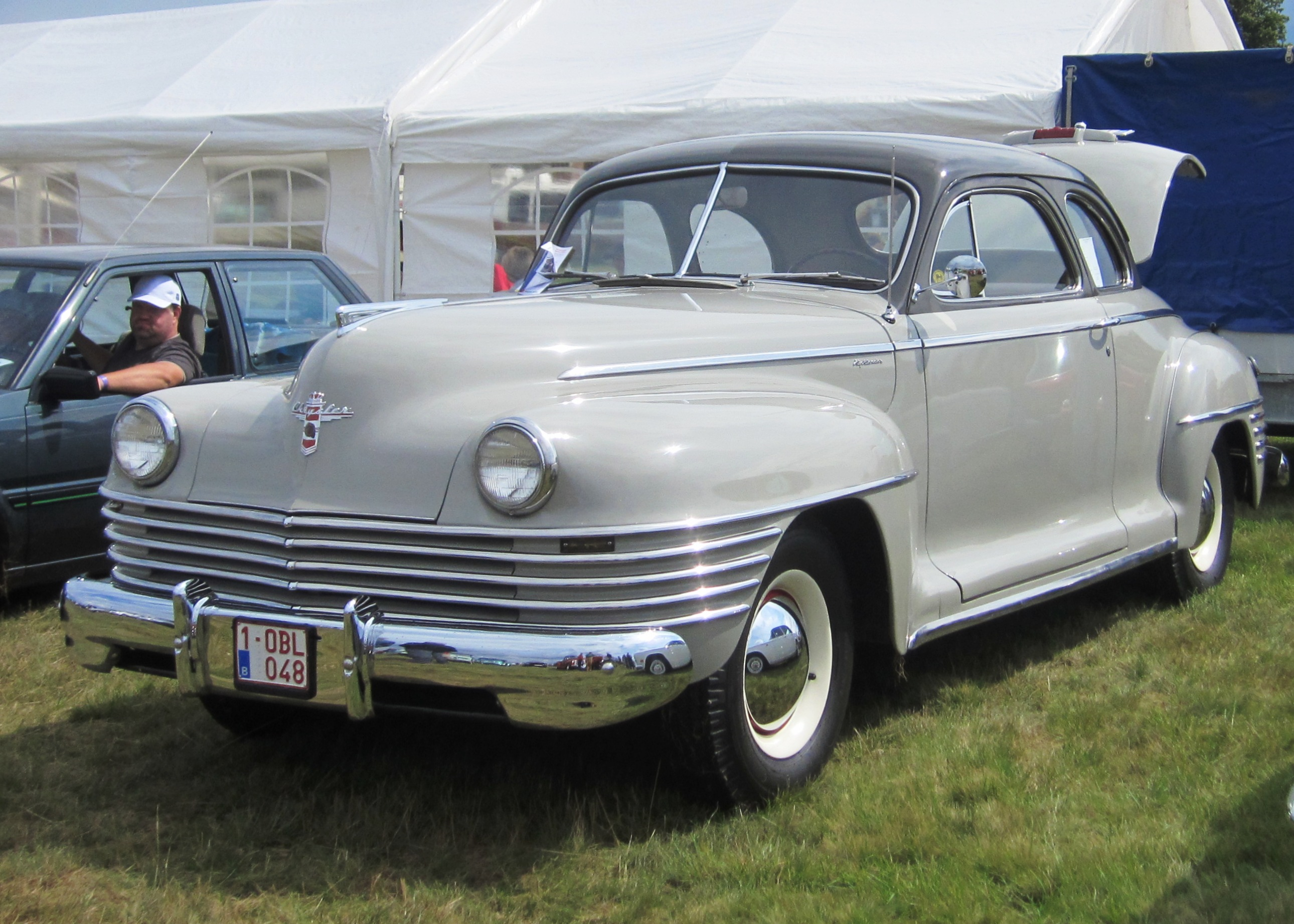
- 1942 Chrysler Saratoga Club Coupe

Overview
- Model years: 1939–1942
- Assembly: Jefferson Avenue Assembly; Detroit, Michigan

Body and chassis
- Body style: 2/4-door sedan 2-door coupe
- Layout: FR layout
- Related: Chrysler Imperial; Chrysler New Yorker; Chrysler Newport Phaeton; Chrysler Royal

Powertrain
- Engine: 298.7 cu in (4.9 L) Straight Eight; 323.5 cu in (5.3 L) Straight Eight
- Transmission: 3-speed column-shifted manual, w/Cruise and Climb overdrive

Dimensions
- Wheelbase: 125 in (3,175 mm) (1938–1939); 128.5 in (3,264 mm) (1940); 127.5 in (3,238 mm) (1941–1942)

The Saratoga nameplate first appeared in 1939 and shared the 125 in (3,175 mm) wheelbase and the 323.5 cu in (5.3 L) Chrysler Straight-8 with the C-23 Imperial and C-23 New Yorker. At its introduction, it was Chrysler's second most expensive models, above that of the Imperial and the New Yorker but below the Series C-24 Imperial Custom sedans and limousines. It was only offered as a Club Coupe or the four-door sedan. Prices listed for the 1939 Saratoga were US$1,495 ($34,603 in 2025 dollars) for the Club Coupe and US$1,443 ($33,400 in 2025 dollars) for the four-door Sedan. Saratogas were introduced as a "sports luxury", with leather and Bedford cord upholstery, with an optional sun roof, while the optional, high compression aluminum cylinder head was available. Chrysler had a history of producing race car products going back to the Chrysler Six that was entered in the 1925 24 Hours of Le Mans.

In 1940, Chrysler updated the Series C-23 with the Series C-26 and all came with a 128.5 in (3,264 mm) wheelbase and the 323.5 cu in (5.3 L) Chrysler Straight-8. The Saratoga became a sports luxury trim package as a sedan only, and in two interior configurations, standard and sport formal. The latter had a glass privacy partition in the front seat back which could be lowered as found in limousines. The all-new Chrysler Traveler was the economy model, the New Yorker was luxury focused, and New Yorker Highlander models came with tartan interior. Fluid Drive was offered for the first time, mated to a three-speed manual transmission along with Cruise and Climb overdrive.

In 1941, the Saratoga was assigned to Chrysler's Series C30 and was demoted to the bottom of the eight-cylinder series, replacing the Traveler. Body styles offered expanded to include a business coupe, club coupe, two-door sedan and four-door Town Sedan, as well as the six-window sedan. The Saratoga offered Fluid Drive and the eight-cylinder version of Vacamatic which consisted of a three-speed transmission mated to an overdrive unit.

For 1942 the Series C-36 Saratoga was again available only with an eight-cylinder engine along with the same transmission selections as in 1941. Selection of body styles also remained as in 1941.

== 1946–1948 ==
Second generation (Series C-39)
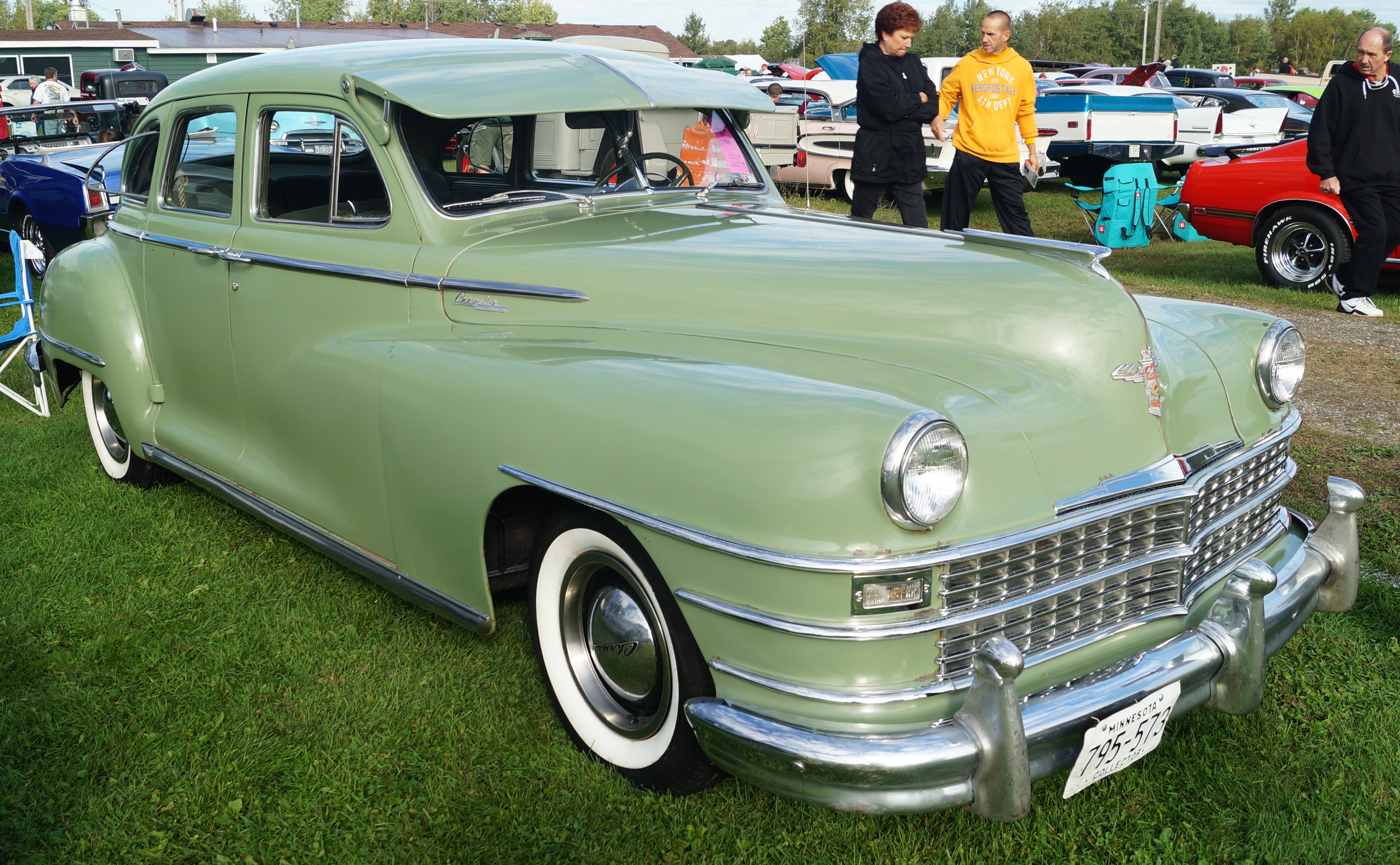
- 1947 Chrysler Saratoga sedan

Overview
- Model years: 1946–1948
- Assembly: Jefferson Avenue Assembly; Detroit, Michigan (starting 1948); Los Angeles (Maywood) Assembly; Los Angeles, California

Body and chassis
- Body style: 4-door sedan 2-door coupe
- Layout: FR layout
- Related: Chrysler Imperial; Chrysler New Yorker; Chrysler Windsor; Chrysler Royal; Chrysler Town and Country; DeSoto Custom

Powertrain
- Engine: 323.5 cu in (5.3 L) Straight Eight
- Transmission: 3-speed steering column shift synchromesh manual 3-speed steering column shift synchromesh manual w/Fluid Drive; Presto-Matic 4-speed semi-automatic

Dimensions
- Wheelbase: 127.5 in (3,238 mm)
- Length: 214.3 in (5,443 mm)
- Width: 77.8 in (1,976 mm)

The Saratoga nameplate returned for 1946, positioned as Chrysler's second expensive eight-cylinder model below the New Yorker, in a full array of body styles shared with the New Yorker wheelbase, sharing the die-cast grille with all Chrysler products. The body styles available were the two-door three-passenger coupe, two-door six-passenger Brougham Sedan, two-door six-passenger Club Coupe and the four-door sedan. The Saratoga was related to the six-cylinder Chrysler Windsor with the same longer wheelbase, along with the Chrysler Royal and the DeSoto Custom. Prices listed for the Saratoga averaged at US$1,826 ($30,148 in 2025 dollars) and 1,544 were recorded to have been manufactured in 1946.

Annual styling changes were almost non-existent between 1946 and the "First Series" 1949 Chryslers. Distinguishing a Chrysler model was limited to a nameplate attached on the front fender just below the engine hood, interior upholstery and standard features installed that were optional on other models. The Saratoga offered pile fabric or broadcloth upholstery, rubber floor covering for the front passengers with a carpeted rear passenger compartment, turn signals, an electric clock, two-speed electric windshield wipers, and an illuminated trunk compartment. The upscale Club Coupe offered carpeting for the front passengers.

The interior trim and upholstery was less elaborate than the New Yorker while the Saratoga shared the 127.5 in (3,238 mm) wheelbase, straight eight engine and standard equipment but shared an appearance used on the Chrysler Royal which was only available with a six-cylinder engine. Because of government restrictions on manufacturer source goods, Chrysler offered white steel "beauty rings" on its car wheels to give the appearance of wide white wall tires. White wall tires as an option returned in 1947. Fluid Drive continued but the four speed semi-automatic, called Presto-Matic was now offered.

The years initially after the war were a sellers market, as customers replaced vehicles they needed to maintain during the war. When production resumed, Chrysler had very little resistance selling every car they made as customers wanted something new and modern. In 1948, Chrysler increased prices across the board so as to invest in new appearances for the next product cycle. The average price for a Saratoga was US$2,244 ($30,070 in 2025 dollars) and 2,121 were recorded to have been manufactured in 1948. Also starting in 1948 the Maywood, California factory began production until the mid-1970s.

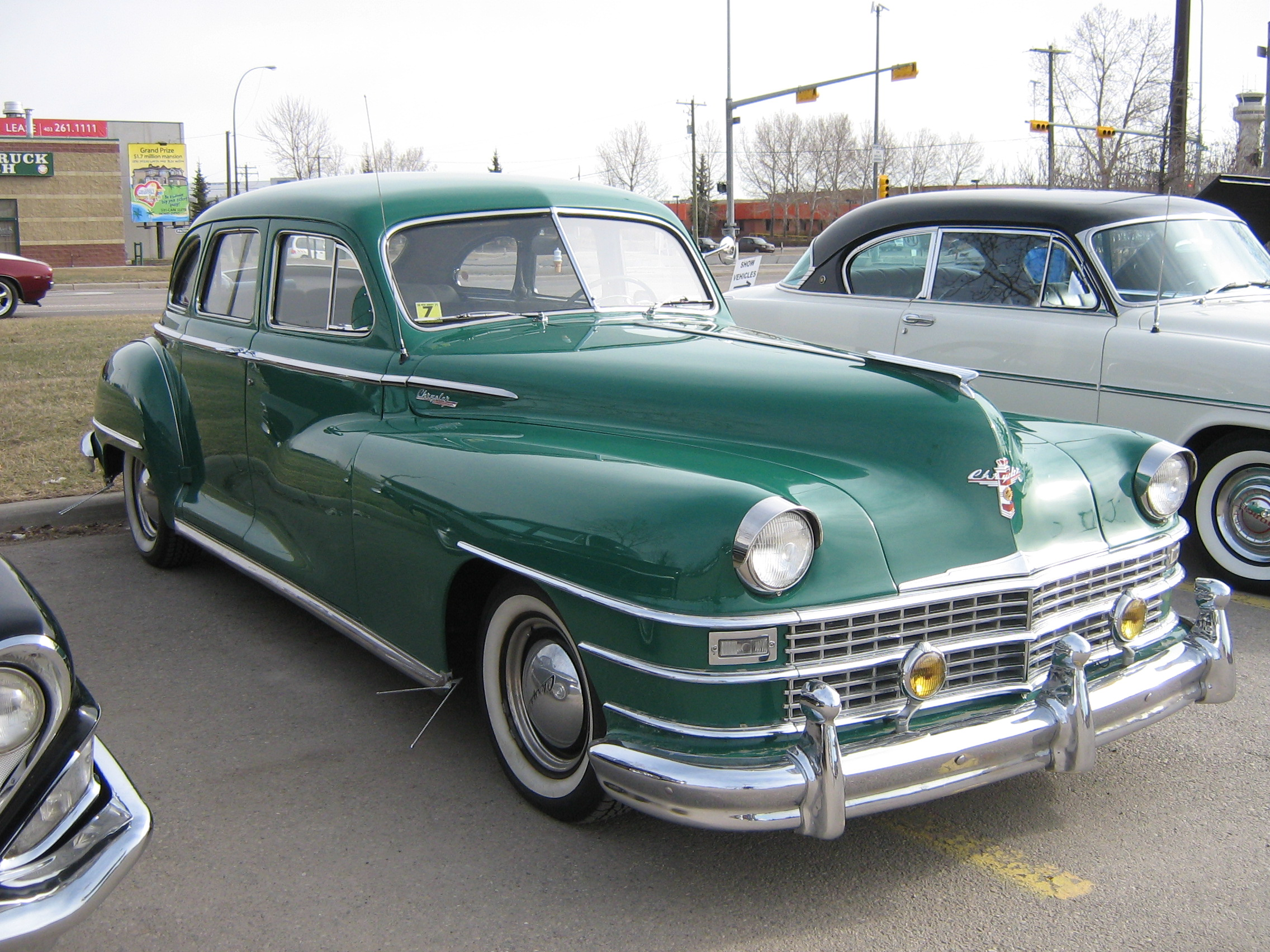
1948 Chrysler Saratoga sedan

== 1949–1952 ==
Third generation (Series C-46K/C-49K/C-55)
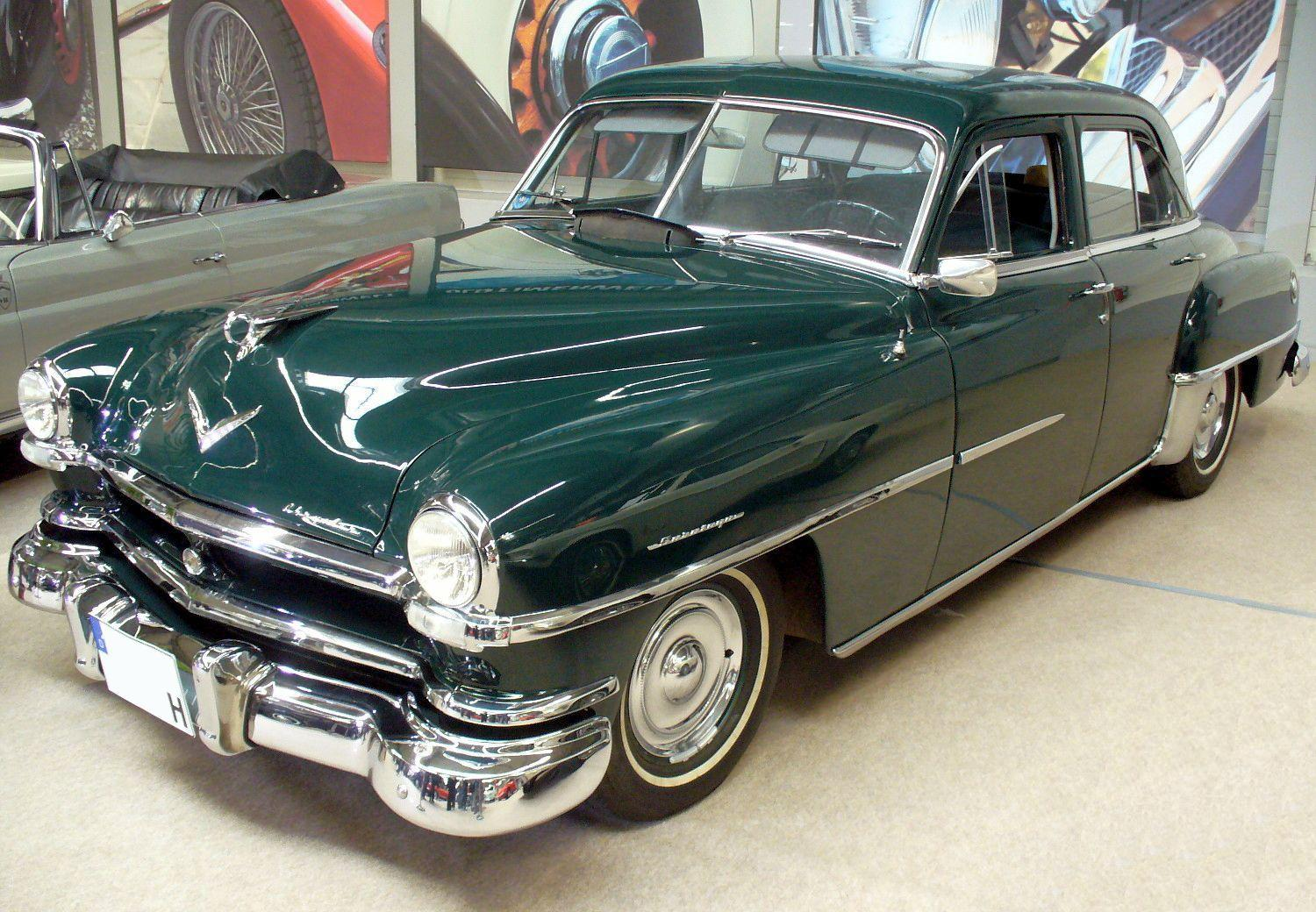
- 1951 Chrysler Saratoga Series C-55 sedan

Overview
- Model years: 1949–1952
- Assembly: Jefferson Avenue Assembly; Detroit, Michigan; Los Angeles (Maywood) Assembly; Los Angeles, California

Body and chassis
- Body style: 2-door coupe; 4-door sedan; 4-door, 8-passenger sedan (1951); 4-door station wagon (1951-1952)
- Layout: FR layout
- Related: Chrysler Imperial; Chrysler Town and Country; Chrysler New Yorker; Chrysler Windsor; Chrysler Royal; DeSoto Custom; DeSoto Firedome; DeSoto Powermaster

Powertrain
- Engine: 323.5 cu in (5.3 L) Spitfire I8; 331 cu in (5.4 L) FirePower V8
- Transmission: 2-speed steering column shift Presto-Matic; 4-speed steering column shift Fluid Drive

Dimensions
- Wheelbase: 131.5 in (3,340 mm); 125.5 in (3,190 mm)
- Length: 211.75 in (5,378 mm) (1949–1950); 213.25 in (5,417 mm) (1951–1952)
- Width: 75.12 in (1,908 mm) (1949–1952); 76.25 in (1,937 mm) (1953)
- Height: 62.75 in (1,594 mm) (1953)

When the fully redesigned 1949 "Second Series" Chryslers bowed in mid-season, the Saratoga was once again regulated to two body styles, the four-door sedan and two-door club coupe, and shared the 131.5 in (3,340 mm) wheelbase and the 323.5 cu in (5.3 L) Chrysler Straight-8 engine of the Chrysler New Yorker and the reintroduced Imperial. The semi-automatic was now called Prestomatic on Chryslers. Saratoga production for 1949 came to 2,275 vehicles in total, and the average list price for the Saratoga was US$2,461 ($33,301 in 2025 dollars). Model year 1949 and later Chryslers had a padded dash as a safety feature, the first in an American mass production car.

1950 models received new grilles, taillights and a larger rear window. Production dropped to 1,300 cars.

The 1951 Saratoga was introduced well into the model year. Early brochures have no mention of it. In Chrysler's model numbering system it was designated C55. The two numerical didgets don't correspond to model years. For 1951 the Saratoga was built on the shorter 125.5 in (3,188 mm) wheelbase shared with the flathead six powered Windsor, but offered the Chrysler's famed 331 cu in (5.4 L) Hemi V8. Power drum brakes were standard with v8 engines. Also offered as an option was Hydraguide power steering, an industry first, and Fluid Torque Drive, a true torque converter in place of Fluid Drive's fluid coupling. The engine was used in the Cunningham C-2R where the C-2R debuted at 1951 24 Hours of Le Mans, continuing a tradition of racing Chrysler engines at LeMans which began in 1925. 1951 and 1952 Saratoga 2 door Club Coupe models were the lightest body styles with the 180 horse power Hemi V8's and were used in road racing and stock car racing.

In the 1951 La Carrera Panamericana, a cross country rally from the northern border of Mexico to the southern border, a Saratoga driven by Bill Sterling came in third behind two Ferraris. Minnesota based outboard boat motor manufacturer Mercury Marine owned by Carl Kiekhaefer raced a pair of Saratogas in the grueling multiday race in 1951 and 1952. Average speeds approached 110 miles an hour in some segments and a Saratoga had the top average speed in one segment.

Model selection also increased for 1951 with a wagon plus eight-passenger sedan and on the 139.5 in (3,543 mm) wheelbase added. This combination of the shorter, lighter Six body and the powerful new V-8 put the new Hemi Saratoga in the same performance league as the Olds Rocket 88, but was the quicker car. 1951 proved to be a great year with 34,806 cars built. Most were six-passenger, four-door sedans. Two-door Club Coupes, four-door station wagons, and eight-passenger, four-door sedans were relatively rare. Two forward facing jump seats ahead of the back seat provided the extra seating in the latter model. Unlike the Windsor, which offered an eight-passenger sedan as well as a limousine, no 1951-1952 Saratoga limousines were built. V8 limousine customers were only offered the Crown Imperial. The difference between an 8-passenger sedan verses a limousine was the presence of a glass divider and all leather seating surfaces in the front compartment.

1952 brought new tail lamps with the backup lamps moved to the same housing as the tail lamps. Due to the Korean War, production dropped to 17,401 for the 1952 model year. A further 1,300 Saratoga models were built in Canada, the first eight-cylinder Chryslers to roll out of the Windsor plant since 1937. 1952 Model year Chryslers suffered from a war strategic materials shortage and the pot metal trim was painted silver rather than chromed.

For 1953 the Saratoga was discontinued, and the Saratoga's sports luxury duties were initially given to the New Yorker in 1953 until the performance coupe Chrysler 300 was introduced in 1955. The nameplate would reappear for 1957.

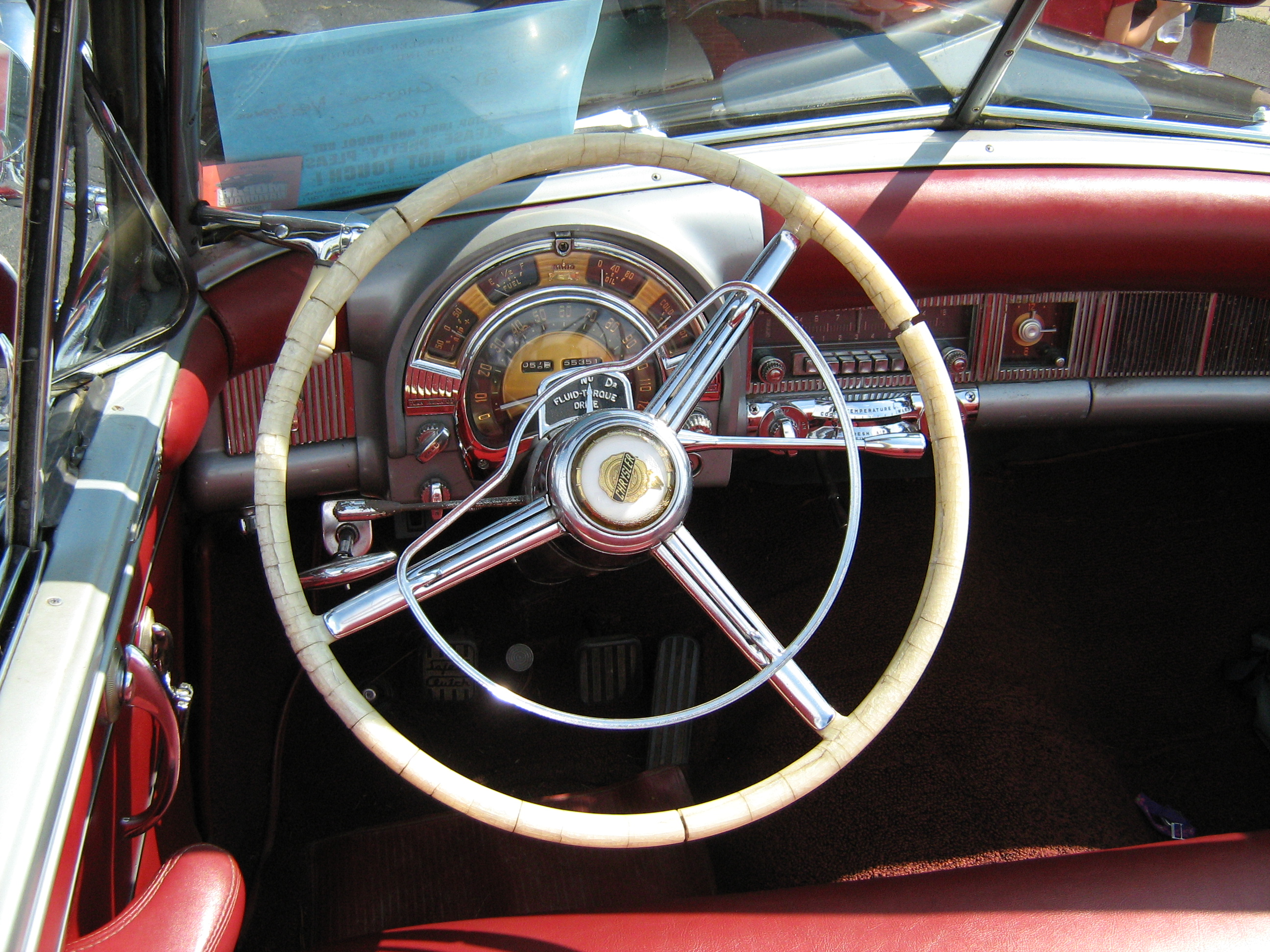
1951 Chrysler instrument cluster

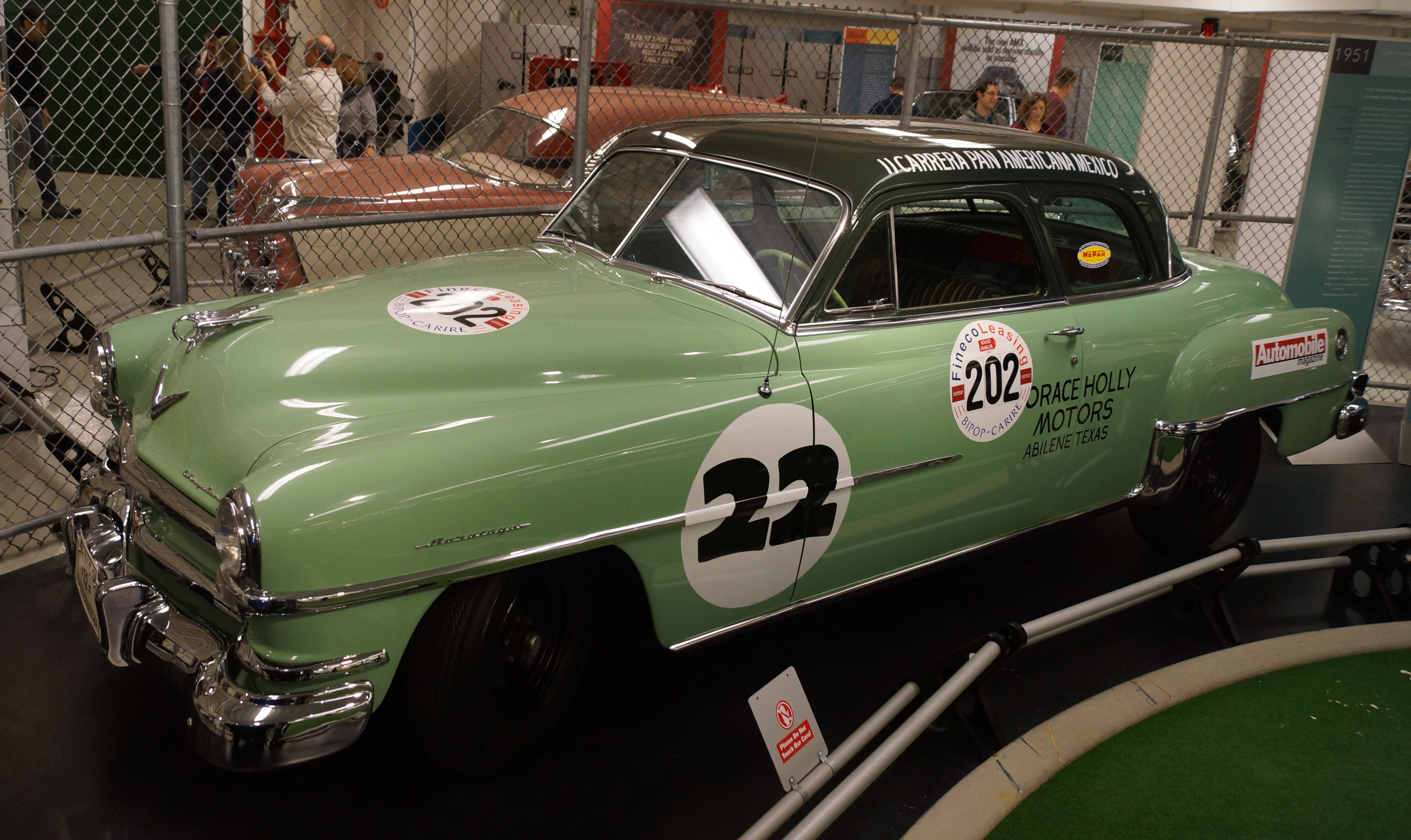
1951 Chrysler Saratoga stock car

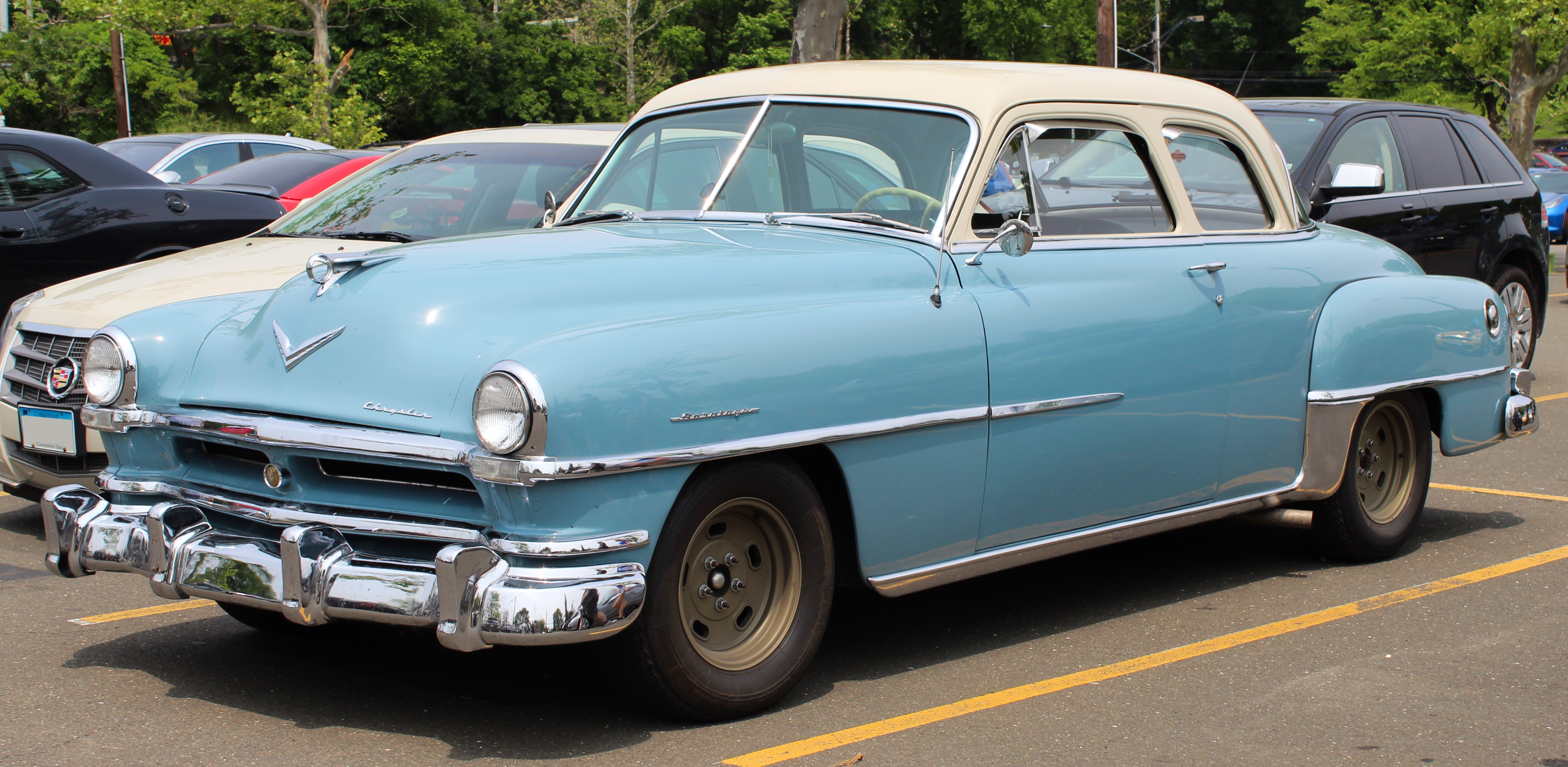
1952 Chrysler Saratoga Club Coupe with non-standard wheels

== 1957–1960 ==
Fourth Generation
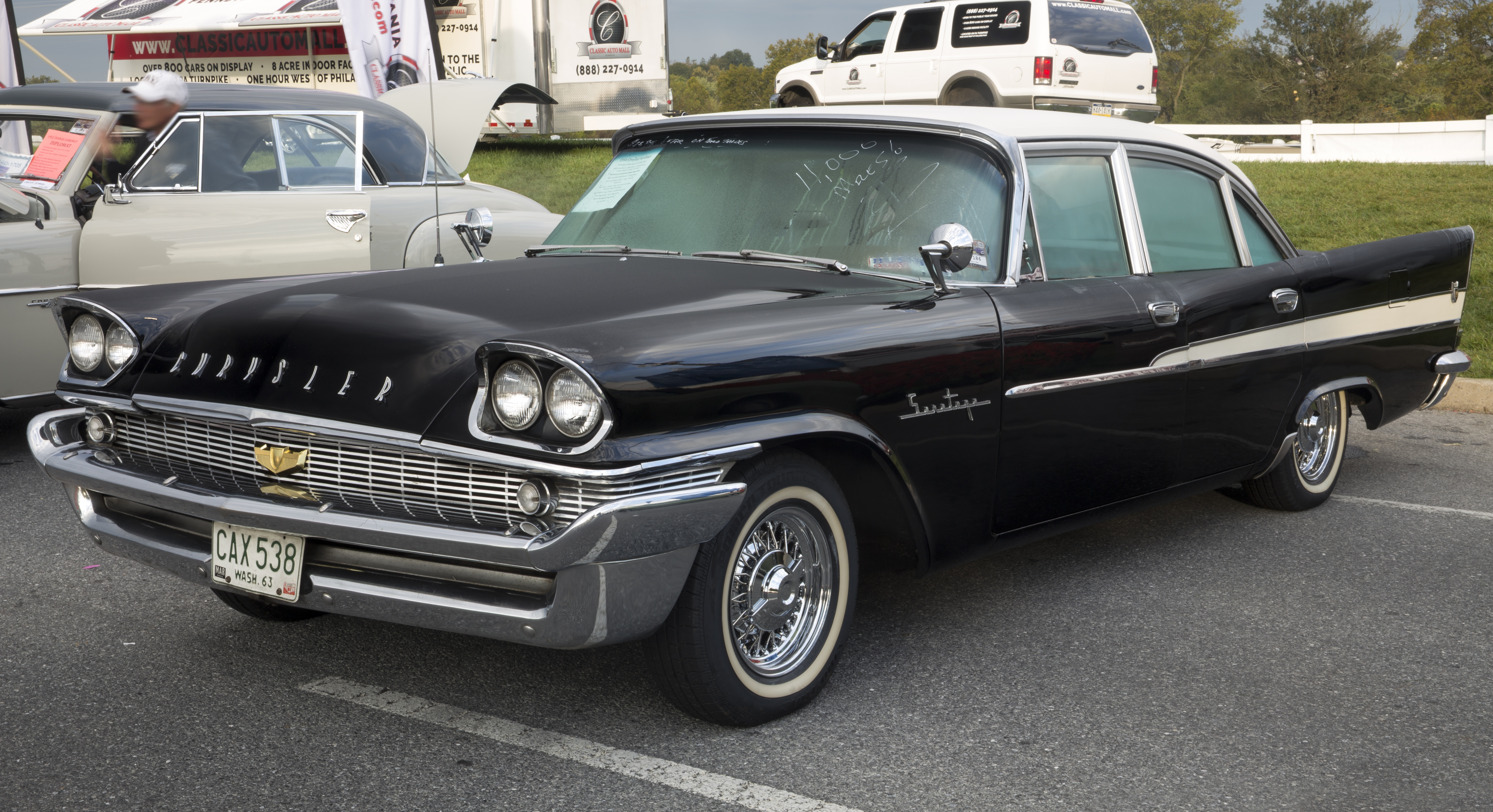
- 1958 Chrysler Saratoga 4-Door Sedan

Overview
- Model years: 1957–1960
- Assembly: Jefferson Avenue Assembly; Detroit, Michigan; Los Angeles (Maywood) Assembly; Los Angeles, California; Windsor Assembly, Windsor, Ontario, Canada

Body and chassis
- Layout: FR
- Related: Chrysler 300C, D, E Chrysler Town & Country; Chrysler Windsor; DeSoto Firesweep; Dodge Coronet; Plymouth Belvedere

Powertrain
- Engine: 354 cu in (5.8 L) Spitfire V8; 383 cu in (6.3 L) B V8; 392 cu in (6.4 L) FirePower V8
- Transmission: 3-speed center column floor mounted manual 3-speed TorqueFlite Automatic

Dimensions
- Wheelbase: 126 in (3,200 mm) (1957); 122 in (3,099 mm) (1958)
- Length: 219.2 in (5,568 mm) (1957); 218 in (5,537 mm) (1958)
- Width: 78.8 in (2,002 mm)

Chrysler reused the Saratoga nameplate in 1957 as part of its "Forward Look" styling by Virgil Exner. The Saratoga maintained its position between the entry-level Windsor and top New Yorkers models, and was related to the DeSoto Firedome, but received trim upgrades and better appointments inside the passenger compartment. The tradition of adding the Newport as a suffix to the model name continued and a four-door hardtop was added. The base V8 in the Saratoga was a cast-iron 354 cu in (5.80 L) "Poly head" V8 shared with the Windsor. Chrysler's highly praised Hemi was available on the Saratoga and Windsor as an option and a larger 392 cubic inch with dual four-barrel carburetors that was standard on the more upscale Chrysler 300. Early 1957 models featured dual headlights, with quad-headlights as an option where permitted by state law. By the model year's end all Saratogas were outfitted with quad headlights. Saratoga production for 1957 came to 37,196 vehicles and the average list price for the Saratoga was US$3,768 ($43,194 in 2025 dollars).

For 1958, all Windsors were shifted to the 122 inch Dodge chassis, and used a modified front end design based in part on Dodge's front clip - this was especially evident around the Windsor's headlights. The Saratogas continued to be based on the longer 126 inch wheelbase using the New Yorker body and was again available in three body styles – four-door sedan, four-door hardtop, and two-door hardtop coupe.

In Canada, the 1957–1958 Saratoga was sold as the Windsor. The American Windsor was not sold in Canada although Windsor Town and Country station wagons were imported.

In 1959, the Saratoga remained on the longer Chrysler wheelbase and in the same three models. The Saratoga was sold as the Saratoga in Canada this year, sharing its interior with the Canadian-built DeSoto Firedome. For 1959 the Saratoga got the new RB V8 engine, although it was the Chrysler-only 383-cid in 1959 and 1960. Canadian-built 1959–1960 Saratogas used the B block 383 as used by Dodge and DeSoto.

In its final year in the U.S., the 1960 Chrysler Saratoga was based wholly on the New Yorker body shell, less New Yorker trimmings, and again offered in three body styles – four-door sedan, four-door hardtop, and two-door hardtop coupe. Some 15,525 1960 Chrysler Saratogas rolled off the assembly line.

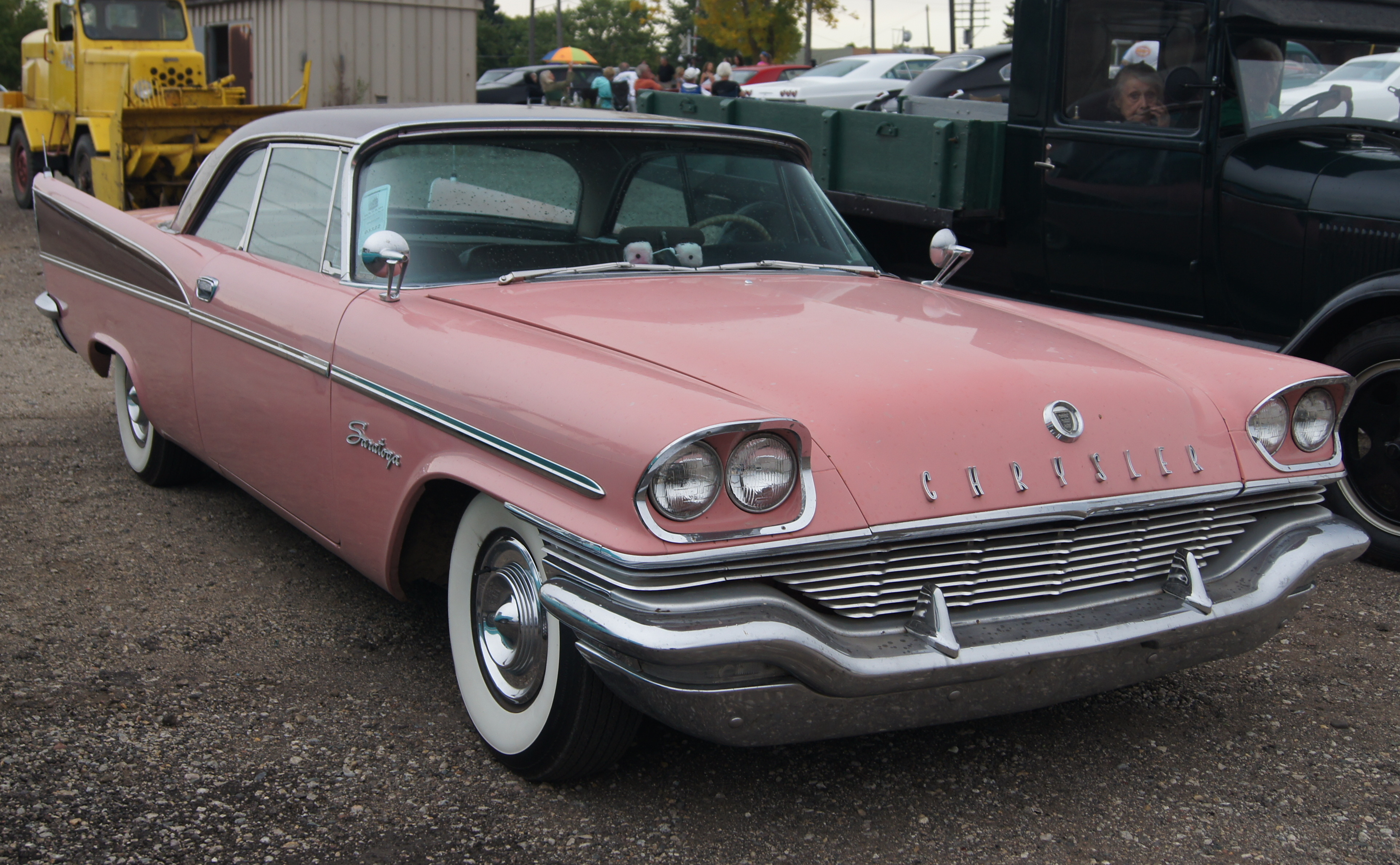
1957 Chrysler Saratoga Newport 2-Door Hardtop

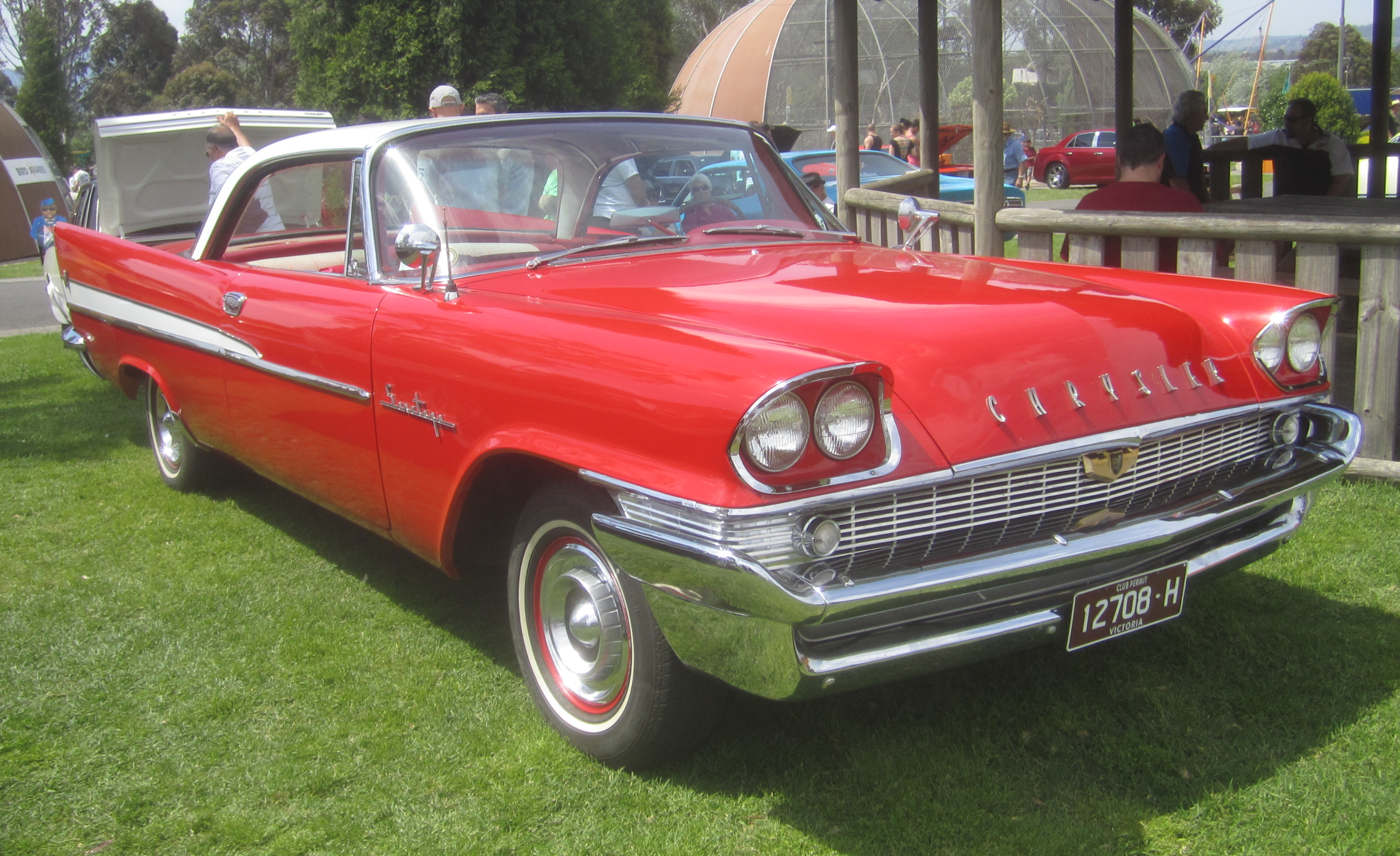
1958 Chrysler Saratoga Newport 2-Door Hardtop

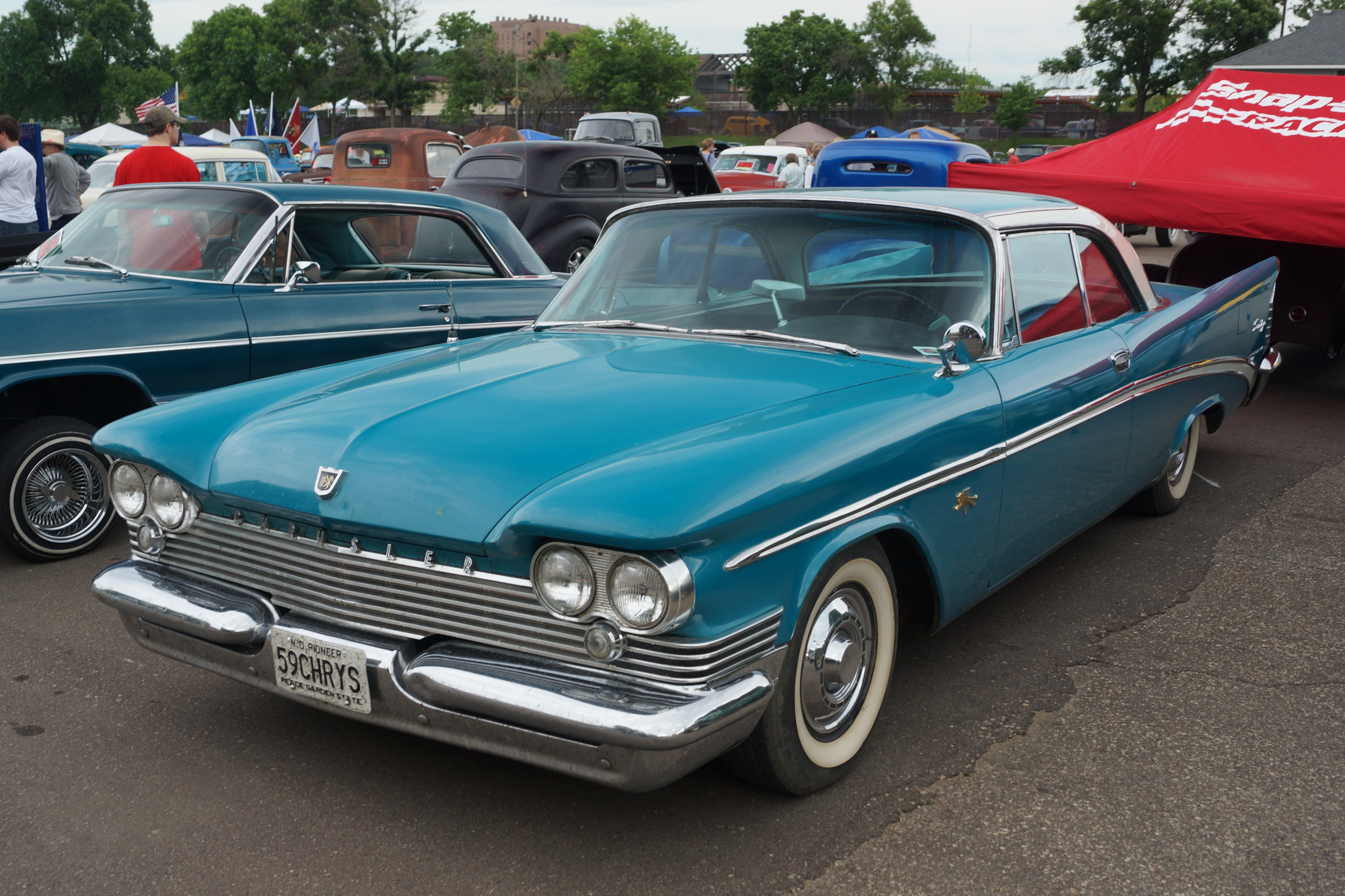
1959 Chrysler Saratoga Newport 2-Door Hardtop

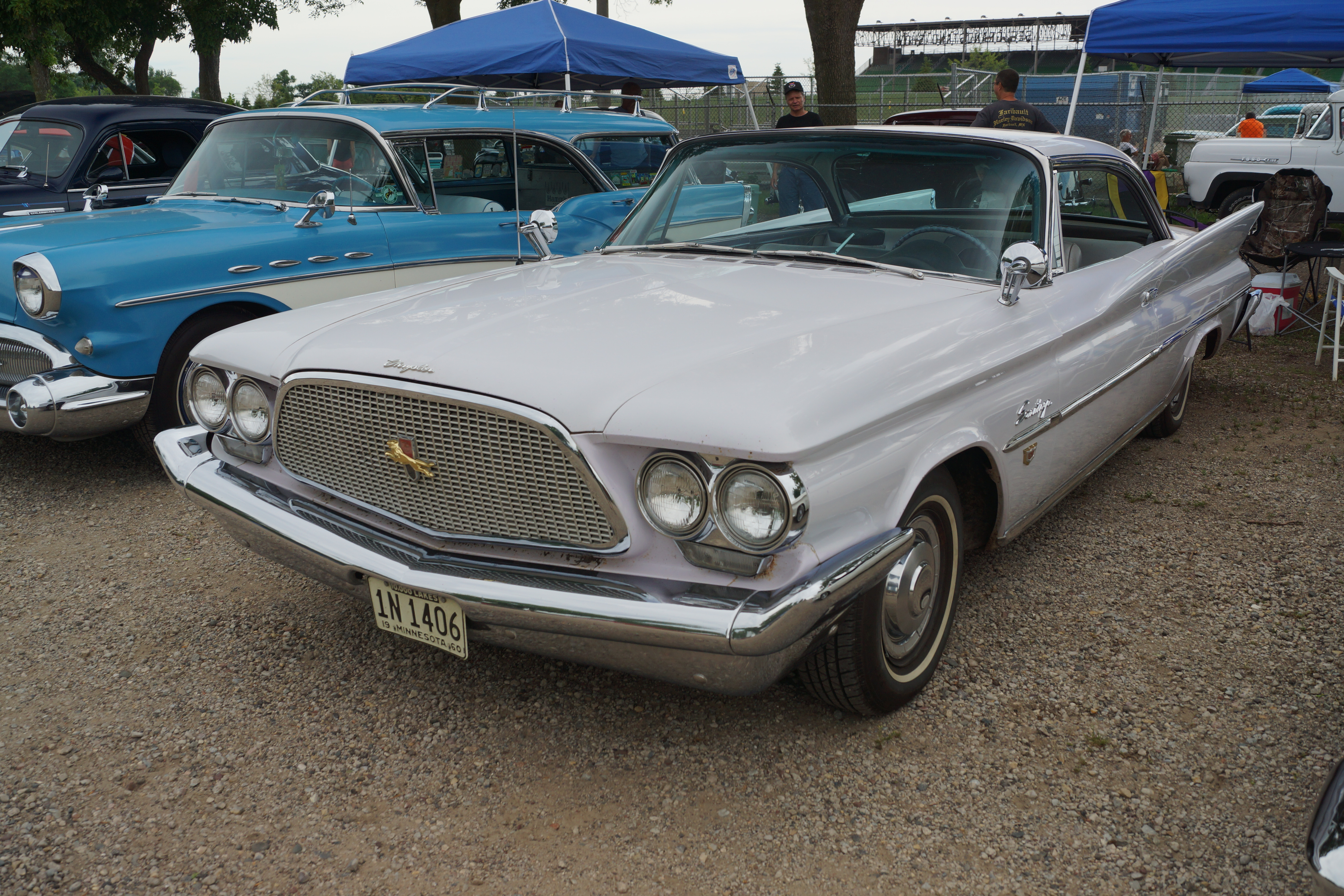
1960 Chrysler Saratoga Newport 2-Door Hardtop

== 1961–1965 (Canada) ==
Fifth generation (Canada)
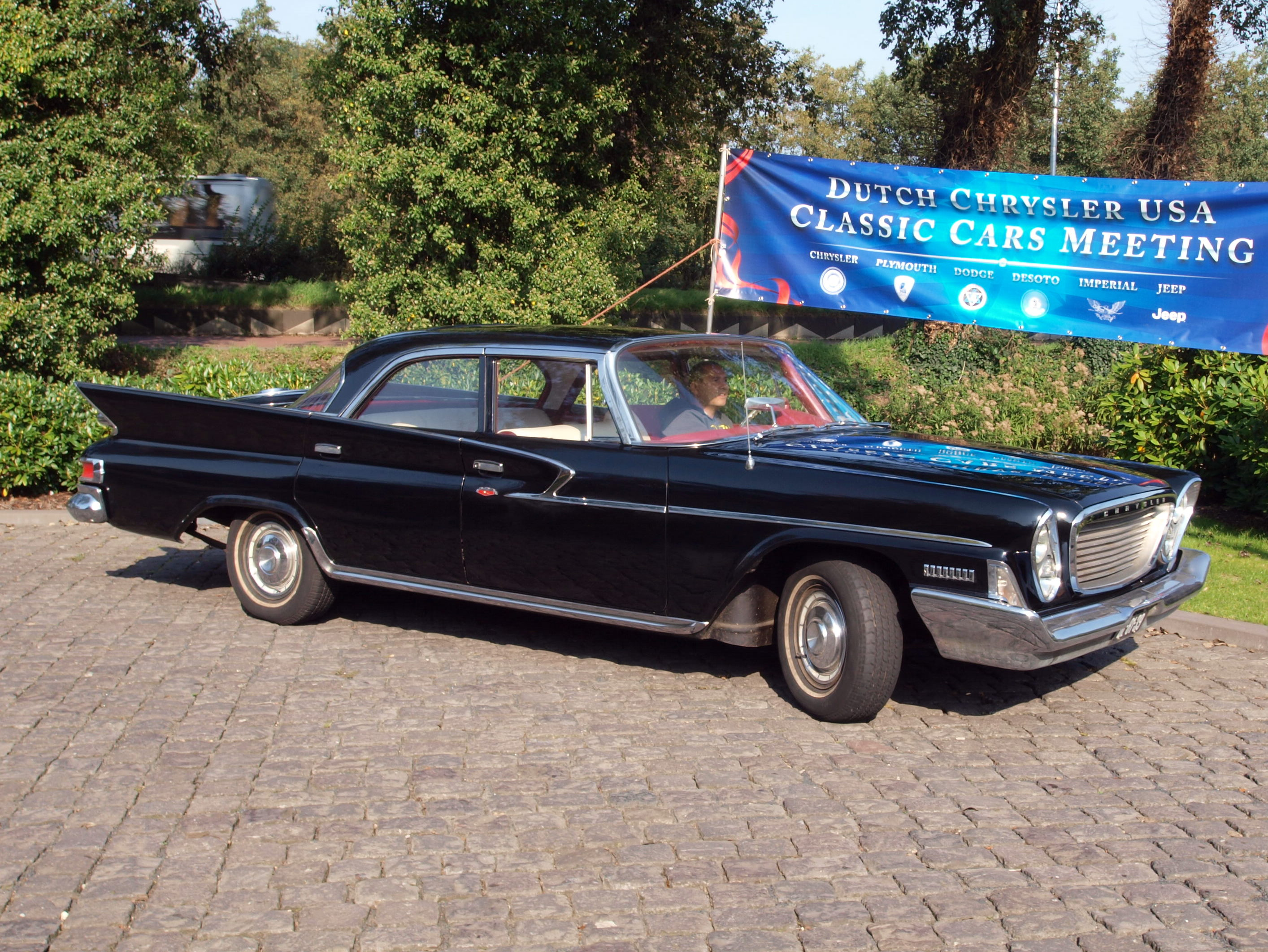
- 1961 Chrysler Saratoga four-door sedan

Overview
- Model years: 1961–1965 (Canada)
- Assembly: Jefferson Avenue Assembly; Detroit, Michigan; Los Angeles (Maywood) Assembly; Los Angeles, California; Windsor Assembly, Windsor, Ontario, Canada
- Designer: Virgil Exner

Body and chassis
- Body style: 4-door sedan 2-door hardtop
- Related: Chrysler 300; Chrysler New Yorker; Imperial Crown; Dodge Custom 880

Powertrain
- Engine: 361 cu in (5.9 L) V8; 383 cu in (6.3 L) V8; 413 cu in (6.8 L) V8
- Transmission: 3-speed automatic PowerFlite automatic 3-speed manual

Dimensions
- Wheelbase: 122 in (3,099 mm)
- Length: 214.9–216.4 in (5,458–5,497 mm)
- Width: 79.4 in (2,017 mm)
- Height: 55.9 in (1,420 mm)
- Curb weight: 3,650–4,215 lb (1,656–1,912 kg)

Whilst the Saratoga was discontinued in the U.S. market after the 1960 model year, it remained an active nameplate in Canada from 1961 through 1965.

In 1961, Chrysler added the Newport as its entry-level model for the American market, positioned below the Windsor. It used a name which in 1961 was commonly associated with Chrysler's expensive hardtops in the early and mid-1950s to take the market segment left open when the manufacturer's DeSoto brand was canceled. In 1961, in the US, the mid-range Saratoga was discontinued, with the Windsor name elevated to the mid-level position, and in 1962 the Windsor was replaced by the introduction of the 300, a non-"letter series" performance-oriented luxury sedan.

The 1961 Saratoga shared a futuristic semi-circular domed instrument cluster Chrysler called the AstraDome, which housed the speedometer and all gauges in one location with the Chrysler 300, Newport, Windsor, and New Yorker. The cluster's appearance was compared to a gum ball machine, and the gauges at night could be viewed with electroluminescent lighting Chrysler called "Panelescent Light", a feature shared with all Chrysler, Dodge, Plymouth, DeSoto, and Imperial vehicles starting in 1960.

In Canada, the Saratoga continued on through to 1965, with the Windsor line remaining as the base model. Thus the Canadian 1961 Saratoga was basically the US' Windsor, with Saratoga nameplates, on the 122 inch wheelbase.

For 1962, the new 300 was not offered on the Canadian market, but rather the Saratoga. The grille was shared with the Newport/Windsor while the side trim was from the American Newport. The trunk lid sported New Yorker trim. Model offering remained 4-door sedan and hardtop as well as the 2-door hardtop.

New bodies appeared for 1963 with the Canadian Saratoga using the same grille and trim as the U.S. 300, only with "Saratoga 300" nameplates, as the series was now called. Body styles remained the same and this year the 300 convertible was imported.

Although the American 1964 300 continued to use the 1963 headlamp rings, the Canadian Saratoga 300 used the headlamp treatment of the Newport/Windsor, and had 300 side trim. The American 300 convertible continued to be an import.

1965 brought completely new "C" bodies on a 124-inch wheelbase. Again, the Canadian Saratoga 300 was identical to the U.S. 300. This was the last year for a Saratoga sold in North America.

For 1966 the mid-range Chrysler series in Canada was sold as the 300, except it used Newport/Windsor taillamps. The same three models continued, but this year the American 300 convertible and two-door hardtop were imported and marketed as the Sport 300.

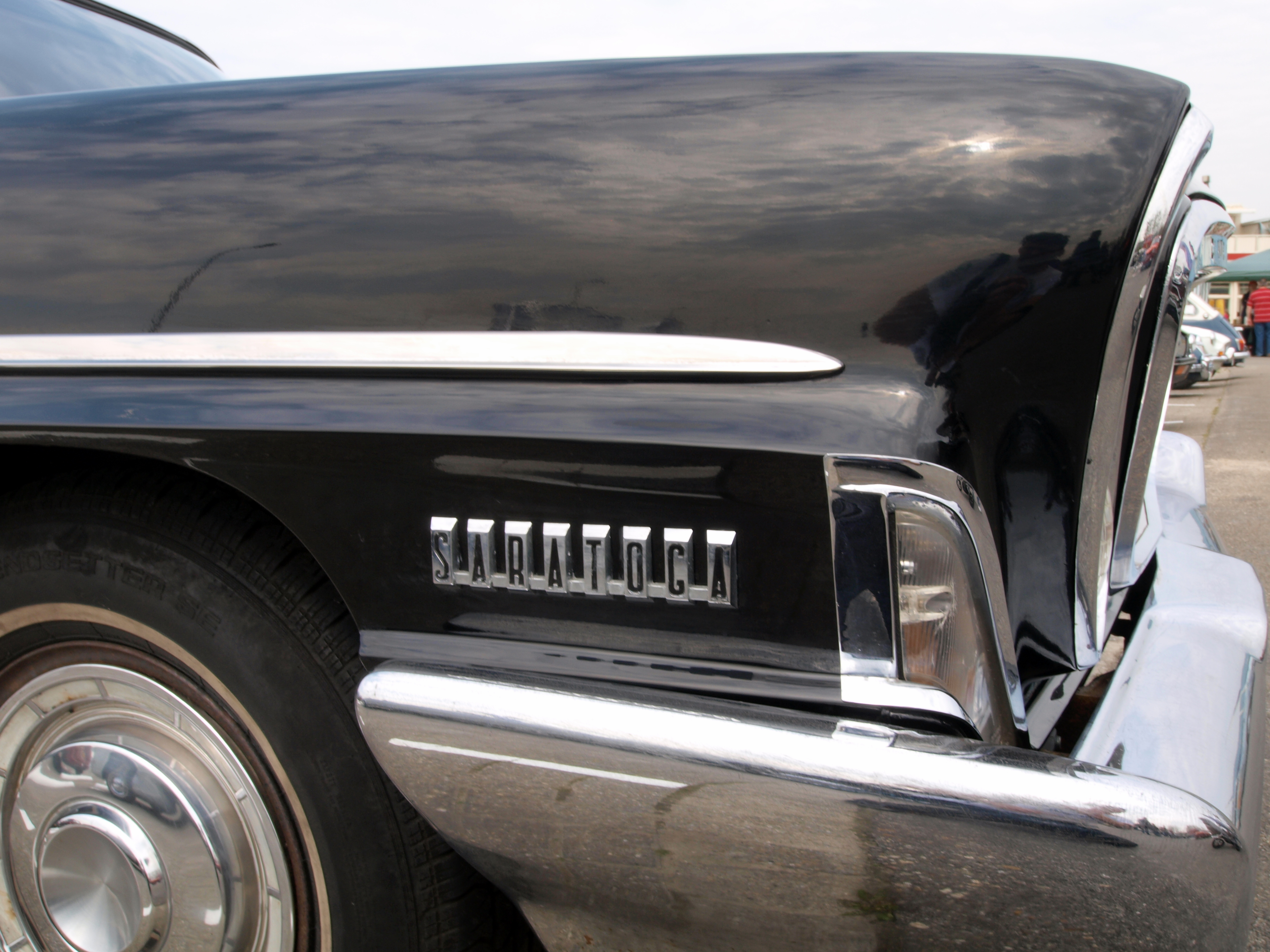
1961 Chrysler Saratoga

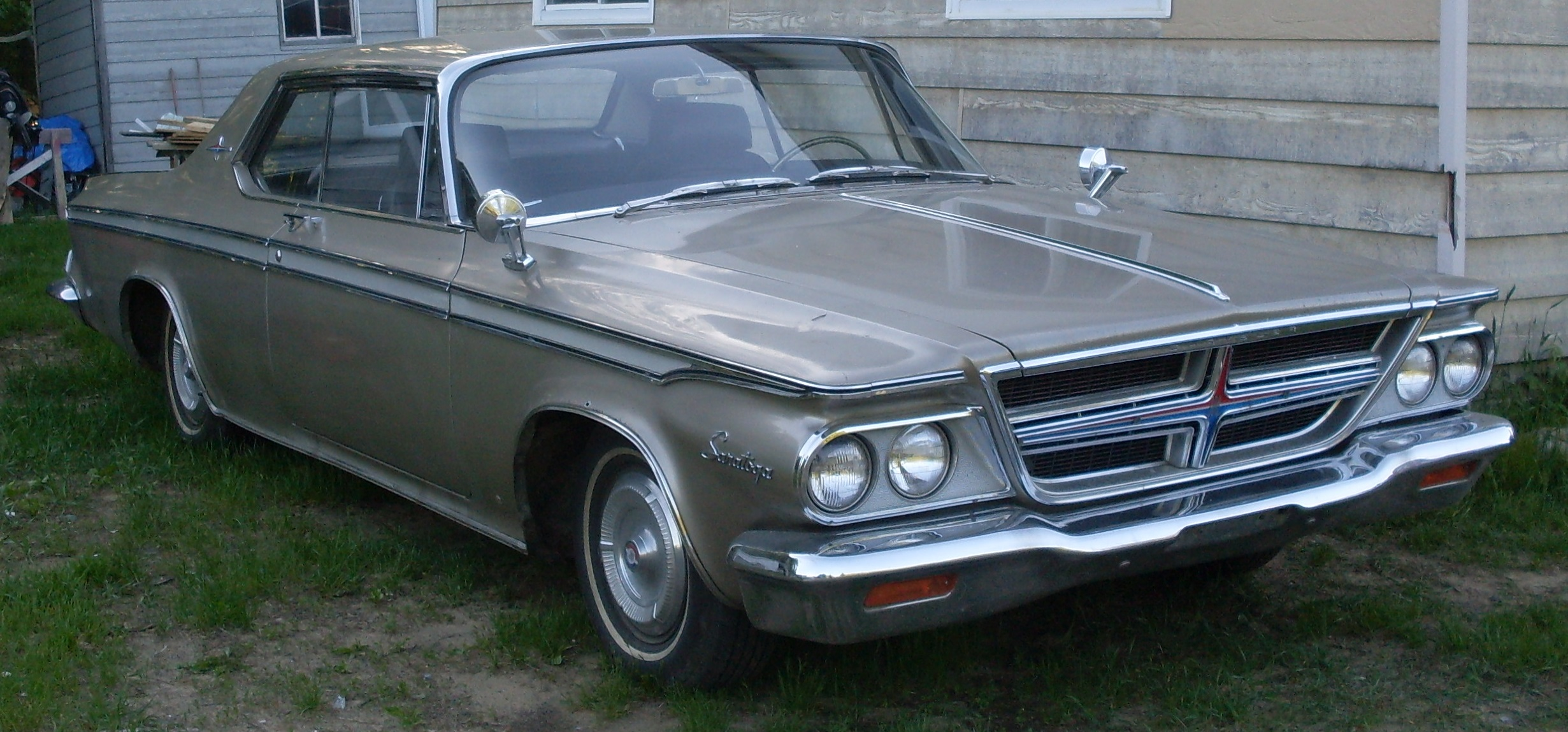
1964 Chrysler Saratoga 300

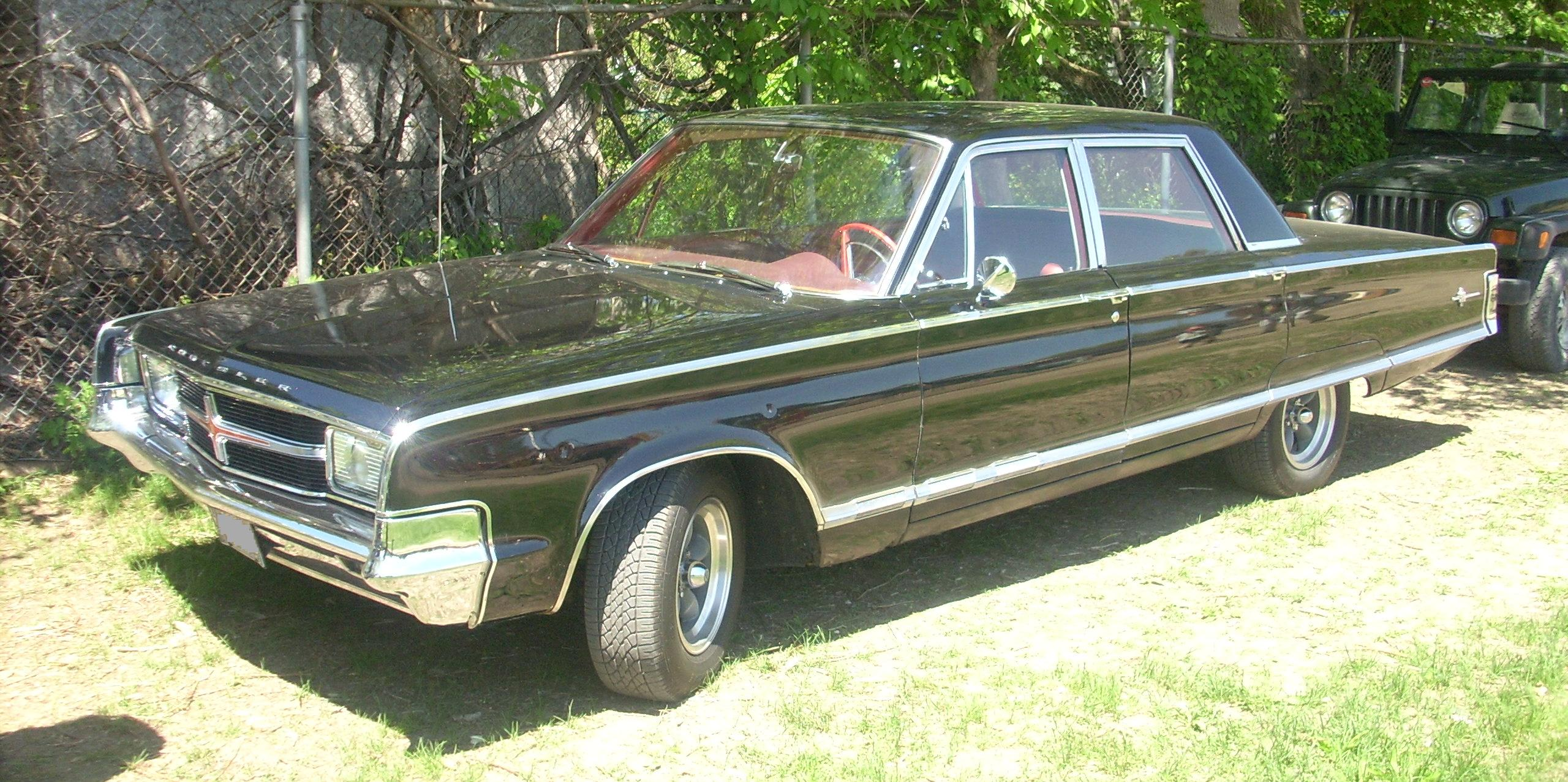
1965 Chrysler Saratoga 300 sedan

== 1989–1995 ==
Sixth generation
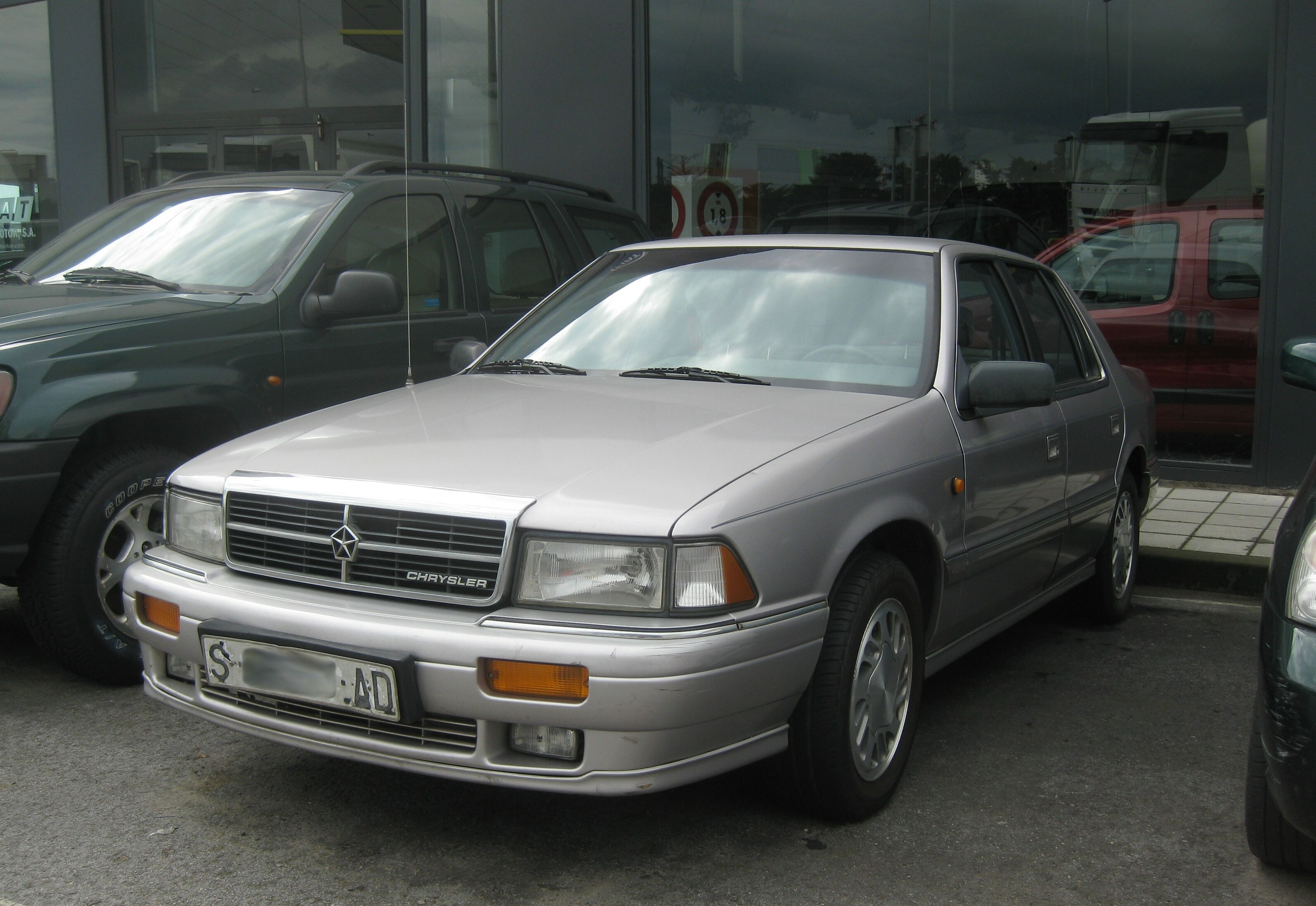

Overview
- Also called: Chrysler New Yorker (Mexico); Dodge Spirit; Plymouth Acclaim
- Production: 1989–1994
- Assembly: Newark, Delaware, United States (Newark Assembly); Toluca, Mexico (Toluca Car Assembly); Valencia, Carabobo, Venezuela

Body and chassis
- Class: Mid-size
- Body style: 4-door sedan
- Layout: Transverse front-engine, front-wheel drive
- Platform: AA-body
- Related: Chrysler LeBaron; Dodge Spirit; Plymouth Acclaim

Powertrain
- Engine: 2.5 L Chrysler K I4; 3.0 L Mitsubishi 6G72 V6
- Transmission: 2.5 L engines: 5-speed Getrag A523 manual; 3-speed A413 automatic; 3 L engines: 5-speed Getrag A543 manual; 5-speed Getrag A555 manual; 5-speed Getrag A568 manual; 3-speed A670 automatic; 4-speed A604 automatic

Dimensions
- Wheelbase: 103.5 in (2,629 mm)
- Length: 182.7 in (4,641 mm)
- Width: 68.1 in (1,730 mm)
- Height: 53.7 in (1,364 mm)
- Curb weight: 2,971 lb (1,348 kg)

Chronology
- Successor: Chrysler Stratus

The Saratoga name was revived in 1989 when Chrysler rebadged its Dodge Spirit sedan for export to Europe. Marketing of this Saratoga was officially discontinued in 1993, but the Saratoga continued being built and exported, and parts unique to it continued being catalogued through the 1995 end of A-body production. It was manufactured at the Sterling Heights Assembly factory.

These export-market Saratogas were not simply Dodge Spirits with different nameplates. Differing vehicle safety regulations in the rest of the world versus North America required the Saratoga to have different headlamps and front, side, and rear lights and reflectors, glass, mirrors, seat belts, instrument clusters and radios; engine control units were programmed in accord with European emission standards rather than the North American standards. All Saratogas featured front bucket seats. Basic equipment included the 2.5 L 4-cylinder engine with throttle-body fuel injection and a 5-speed manual transmission; the most commonly ordered powertrain upgrade was the Mitsubishi 3.0 L V6 with A604 Ultradrive 4-speed automatic transmission, though the turbocharged version of the 2.5 was also available with 3-speed Torqueflite automatic or 5-speed manual transaxle. Starting in 1993, the Saratoga was available with leather seats and other luxury equipment not provided in the North American market. Most 1993 and later Saratogas were equipped with the V6/4-speed automatic powertrain. All Saratogas were equipped with the highest-specification suspension and brake systems made by Chrysler for the A-body.

The last Saratogas, sold in 1994 and 1995, were based on the US-market Chrysler LeBaron Sedan. They can be identified by additional fender chrome and an "LE" badge on the trunklid. These models were all equipped with the 3.0 liter Mitsubishi V6, the A604 automatic transmission, leather seats and air conditioning. Saratoga production ended on December 9, 1994, and was replaced with the Chrysler Stratus.

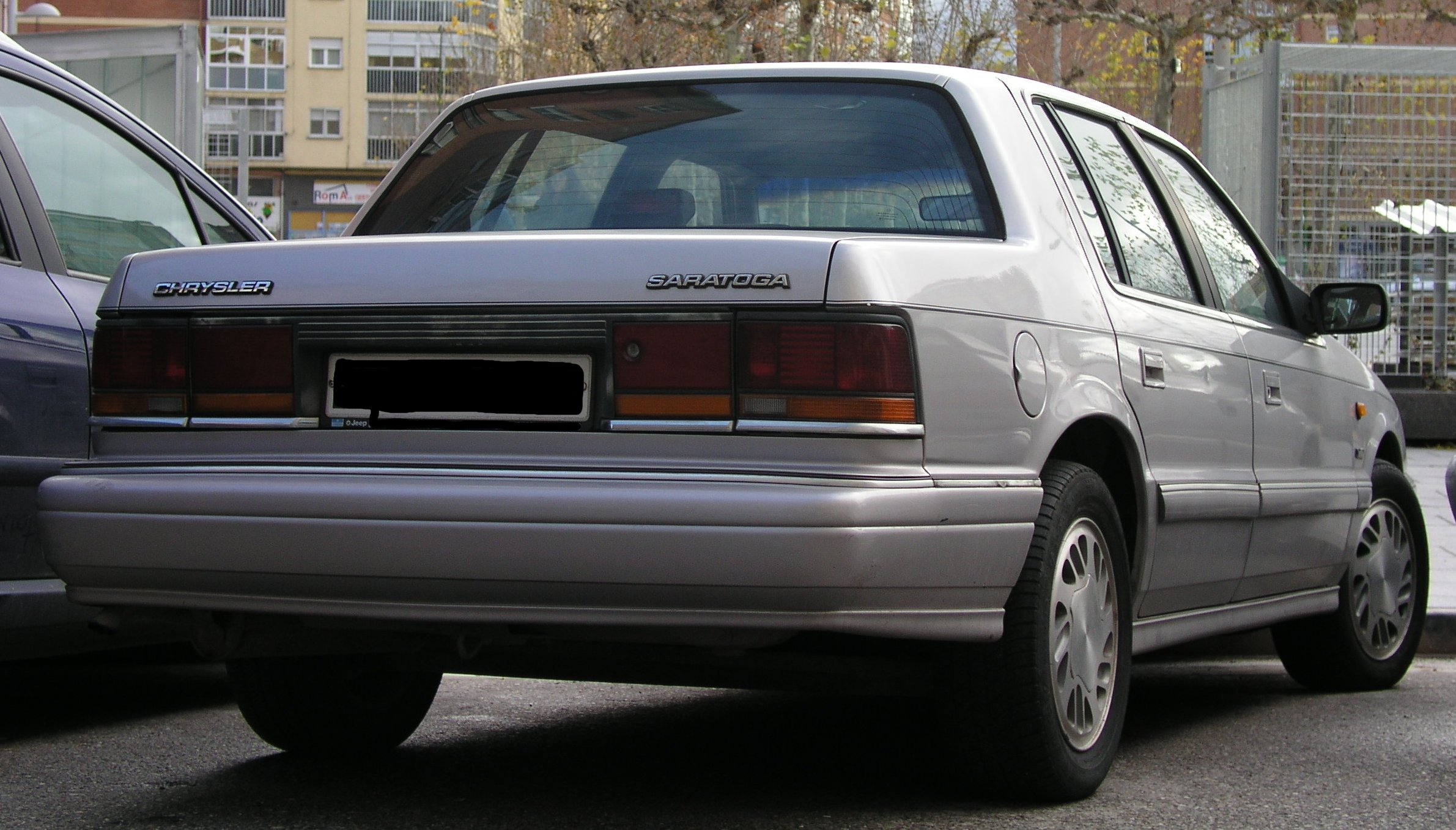
1992–1995 Chrysler Saratoga in Spain

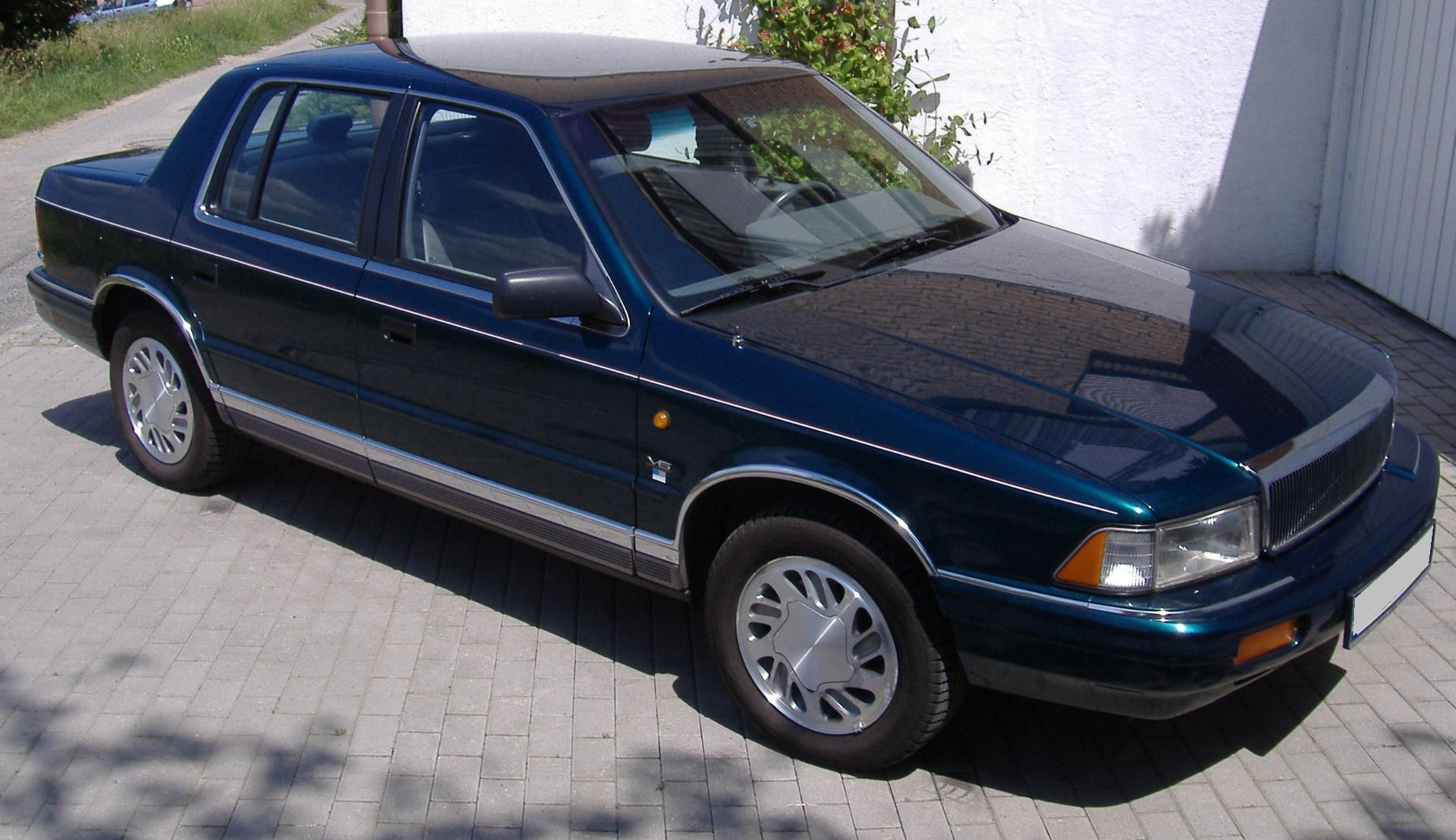
1994 Saratoga based on the LeBaron Sedan
