= Vacamatic =

Automobile transmission system

The 1941 M4 Vacamatic transmission by Chrysler was, historically, the first semi-automatic transmission which was marketed by a major manufacturer. It was an attempt to compete against rivals' hydraulic automatic transmissions, though it still had a clutch, primarily to change range. In normal driving, the clutch is not used. The transmission itself was a fully-synchronized manual transmission, with four forward gears, one reverse; where the shifting was done 'automatically' by either vacuum cylinders (early, M4), or hydraulic cylinders (late, M6, Presto-Matic). The main difference was the addition of a fluid coupling between engine and clutch, and the shifting mechanism.

== Operation ==
The range selector (looked like a column shift) had three positions: Low, High, and Reverse. Low consisted of what would be a first and second gear with an ordinary four-speed; High was third and fourth. The reverse was a single ratio. Driving one was/is quite different: Upon starting, one would disengage the clutch, then choose a ratio (High for normal driving), and, whilst stopped with a foot on the brake, engage the clutch. Pressing the accelerator would move you forward, in third, with the fluid coupling connecting the engine to the transmission. Upon reaching 15–20 mph (24–32 km/h), the accelerator is lifted, a 'clunk' would ensue (the automatic shift), and you would continue in fourth gear. The low range was quite similar, but much slower speeds. It is possible to start in Low, allow the shift, then move the range selector to High, using the clutch, and continue in High. This allowed somewhat faster acceleration but was quite clumsy. Kickdown for passing was possible through electrical connections made by flooring the accelerator, though only in one range (i.e.: fourth to third).

== Commentary ==
Never a performance transmission, it was nevertheless fine behind the six- or eight-cylinder flathead engine but once the V8 Hemi engine was introduced, the shortcomings of such a slow-shifting transmission were magnified greatly. Over the years, though, this transmission has acquired a reputation for absolute reliability.

== See also ==
- Fluid Drive
- List of Chrysler transmissions
