= List of Chrysler transmissions =

Chrysler produces a number of automobile transmissions in-house.

== Semi-automatic ==
- 1941–1942 M4 Vacamatic — 4-speed (2-range manual control with automatic 2-speed shift vacuum operated) with clutch and fluid coupling (Fluid Drive); also known as Simplimatic, Powermatic
- 1946–1953 M5/M6 Presto-Matic — 4-speed (2 gear manual with electric overdrive) with clutch and fluid coupling (Fluid Drive) or torque converter (Fluid Torque Drive); also known as Tip-Toe Shift, Gyro-Matic, Fluid-Matic, Gyro-Torque
- 1953–1954 Hy-Drive — 3-speed manual transmission behind a torque converter

== Automatic ==
- 1954–1961 PowerFlite — 2-speed automatic
- 1956–2007 TorqueFlite
  - 1956–1961 A466 — 3-speed automatic
  - 1962–1994 A727 (36RH/37RH) — 3-speed automatic
  - 1960–2002 A904 (30RH) — 3-speed automatic
  - A998 (31RH) — 3-speed automatic
  - A999 (32RH) — 3-speed automatic
  - 1988–2004 A500 (40RH/42RH/40RE/42RE/44RE) — 4-speed automatic
  - 1992–2003 A518 (46RH/46RE) — 4-speed automatic
  - 1994–2003 A618 (47RH/47RE) — 4-speed heavy-duty automatic
  - 2003–2007 A818 (48RE) — 4-speed heavy-duty automatic
- 1978–1983 A404 — 3-speed front-wheel drive transaxle
  - 1981–2001 A413 (31TH)
  - 1981–1987 A470
  - 1987–2000 A670
- 1989–2020 Ultradrive
  - 1989–2010 A604 (40TE/41TE) — 4-speed transverse front-wheel drive automatic
  - 1991–2004 A604 (41AE) — 4-speed transverse all-wheel drive automatic
  - 1993–2004 A606 (42LE) — 4-speed longitudinal front-wheel drive automatic
  - 2003–2012 42RLE — 4-speed longitudinal rear-wheel drive automatic
  - 2007–2020 40TES/41TES — 4-speed transverse front-wheel drive automatic
  - 2007–2020 62TE — 6-speed transverse front-wheel drive automatic
  - 2007–2019 62TEA — 6-speed transverse all-wheel drive automatic
- 1999–present RFE — longitudinal rear-wheel drive
  - 1999–2003 45RFE — 4-speed (5 gear) automatic
  - 2001–2011 545RFE — 5-speed (6 gear) automatic
  - 2012–2013 65RFE — 6-speed automatic
  - 2012–2018 66RFE — 6-speed heavy-duty automatic
  - 2007–present 68RFE — 6-speed heavy-duty automatic
  - 2005-2020 Chrysler A580 / W5A580, 5-speed automatic. This was a Chrysler adaptation of the Mercedes 722.6. The A580 was first labelled as the NAG1. Commonly found in the 300, Magnum, Charger, Challenger, WK/WK2/WD Grand Cherokee and Durango (through 2013), Wrangler, and some Dodge Ram pickups. The A580 was last built at Kokomo II in August 2018, and remaining inventory was used in the 2019 - 2020 Dodge Charger Pursuit models.

=== Model number conventions ===
Newer Chrysler automatic transmissions follow standard model number conventions. Below are the available values and some example transmission models:

	Speeds	Torque Rating	Drive Orientation	Control System
Values	4; 5; 6	0 · 1; 2 · 5; 7 · 8	Rear; Longitudinal; Transverse	Electronic; Full Electronic; Hydraulic
31TH	3	1	T	H
41TE	4	1	T	E
42LE	4	2	L	E
42RLE	4	2	R · L	E
545RFE	5 · 4	5	R	FE
68RFE	6	8	R	FE

== Manual ==
- 1960–1972 Chrysler A903 — 3-speed manual for 6-cyl and low power V8s. 1st gear, no synchromesh
- 1961–1971 Chrysler A745 — 3-speed manual for V8s
- 1964–1974 Chrysler A833 — 4-speed manual manufactured by New Process Gear
- 1970–1981 Chrysler A230 — 3-speed manual, all-synchromesh
- 1973–1974 Chrysler A250 — 3-speed manual, 1st gear no synchromesh
- 1975–1978 Chrysler A390 — 3-speed manual, all-synchromesh
- 1976–1980 Chrysler A833 — 4-speed manual overdrive (NPG)
- 1981–1986 Chrysler A460 — 4-speed manual transaxle
- 1983–1984 Chrysler A465 — 5-speed manual transaxle
- 1984–1990 Chrysler A525 — 5-speed manual transaxle
- 1987–1989 Chrysler A520 — 5-speed manual transaxle
- 1987–1989 Chrysler A555 — 5-speed manual transaxle, Chrysler-built (NPG) with Getrag-sourced gearset
- 1990–1994 Chrysler A523 — 5-speed manual transaxle
- 1990–1994 Chrysler A543 — 5-speed manual transaxle
- 1990–1993 Chrysler A568 — 5-speed manual transaxle, Chrysler-built (NPG) with Getrag-sourced gearset
- 1995–2005 New Venture Gear T350 (also known as A578 and F5MC1) — 5-speed manual transaxle for the Dodge and Plymouth Neon and various GM subcompacts
- 2001–2007 New Venture Gear T850 — 5-speed manual transaxle
- 2005–2018 Chrysler NSG370 transmission — 6-speed longitudinal manual
- 1962–1993 New Process Gear NP435 — 4-speed longitudinal manual
- 1987–1991 New Process Gear NP535 (also known as New Venture Gear NV2500) — 5-speed longitudinal manual
- New Venture Gear NV1500 — 5-speed longitudinal manual
- 1994–2004 New Venture Gear NV3500 — 5-speed longitudinal manual
  - 2000–2004 New Venture Gear NV3550
- 1992–2005 New Venture Gear NV4500 — 5-speed longitudinal manual
- 1999–2005 New Venture Gear NV5600 — 6-speed longitudinal manual

== Non-Chrysler Transmissions used on Chrysler vehicles ==
=== Automatic ===
- Aisin-Warner AW4 — 4-speed longitudinal
  - 1987–2001 Jeep Cherokee
  - 1987–1992 Jeep Comanche
  - 1993 Jeep Grand Cherokee (with 6-cylinder engine)
- Aisin AS66RC — 6-speed longitudinal with PTO capability
  - 2014–present Ram Chassis Cab 3500/4500/5500 (6.4L V8)
- Aisin AS68RC — 6-speed longitudinal with PTO capability
  - 2007–2012 Dodge Ram Chassis Cab 3500/4500/5500
- Aisin AS69RC — 6-speed longitudinal with PTO capability
  - 2013–present Ram Chassis Cab 3500/4500/5500 (6.7L diesel)
- Aisin AW6F25 (AW60T) — 6-speed transaxle
  - 2017–present Jeep Compass
- Powertech 6F24 — 6-speed transverse front-wheel drive
  - 2013–2016 Dodge Dart
  - 2014–2016 Jeep Compass
  - 2014–2017 Jeep Patriot
- ZF 8HP (also branded as TorqueFlite 8 by Chrysler) — 8-speed longitudinal
  - 8HP45 (replaced by 845RE)
    - 2011–2013 Chrysler 300 V6
    - 2011–2013 Dodge Charger (LD) V6 Retail
    - 2013 Ram 1500 (3.6L V6)
  - 845RE (Chrysler-built version of 8HP45)
    - 2013–2023 Chrysler 300 V6
    - 2013–2023 Dodge Charger (LD) V6 Retail
    - 2014–present Dodge Durango V6
    - 2015–2023 Dodge Challenger V6
    - 2014–present Ram 1500 (3.6L V6)
    - 2014–2016 Jeep Grand Cherokee (WK2) (3.6L V6)
  - 850RE (Chrysler-built version of 8HP50)
    - 2017–2021 Jeep Grand Cherokee (WK2) (3.6L V6)
    - 2018–present Jeep Wrangler (JL)
    - 2021–2023 Dodge Charger V6 AWD Pursuit (LD)
  - 8HP70
    - 2013–2024 Ram 1500 (5.7L V8, 3.0L V6 diesel)
    - 2014–2024 Dodge Durango V8 Retail
    - 2015–2023 Dodge Charger (5.7L & 6.4L V8)
    - 2021–2023 Dodge Charger Pursuit RWD V8 (LD)
    - 2015–2023 Dodge Challenger (5.7L & 6.4L V8)
    - 2014–2021 Jeep Grand Cherokee (WK2) (5.7L & 6.4L V8, 3.0L V6 diesel)
    - 2015–2023 Chrysler 300 V8
  - 8HP90
    - 2015–2023 Dodge Challenger (6.2L V8 s/c)
    - 2015–2023 Dodge Charger (LD) (6.2L V8 s/c)
  - 8HP95
    - 2018–2021 Jeep Grand Cherokee (WK2) (6.2L V8 Supercharged)
    - 2021–2024 Ram 1500 TRX (6.2L V8 Supercharged)
- ZF 9HP — 9-speed transverse
  - 9HP48
    - 2015–2017 Chrysler 200 (3.6L V6)
    - 2017–present Jeep Compass
  - 948TE (Chrysler-built version of 9HP48)
    - 2014–2023 Jeep Cherokee (KL)
    - 2014–present Jeep Renegade
    - 2015–2017 Chrysler 200 (2.4L)
    - 2015–present Ram ProMaster City
    - 2017–present Chrysler Pacifica

=== Manual ===
- Aisin AX5 — 5-speed longitudinal
  - 1984–2000 Jeep Cherokee
  - 1986–1992 Jeep Comanche
  - 1987–2002 Jeep Wrangler
- Aisin AX15 — 5-speed longitudinal
  - 1989–1999 Jeep Cherokee
  - 1989–1992 Jeep Comanche
  - 1993 Jeep Grand Cherokee
  - 1989–1999 Jeep Wrangler
  - 1992–1999 Dodge Dakota
- Aisin BG6 — 6-speed transaxle
  - 2007–2010 Chrysler Sebring (diesel engine)
  - 2006–2011 Dodge Caliber (diesel engine)
  - 2007–2010 Dodge Avenger (diesel engine)
  - 2008–2010 Dodge Journey (diesel engine)
  - 2006–2016 Jeep Compass (diesel engine)
  - 2006–2017 Jeep Patriot (diesel engine)
- Aisin AL6 (D478) — 6-speed longitudinal
  - 2018–present Jeep Wrangler (JL)
- Borg-Warner T-10 — 4-speed longitudinal
  - 1963 Dodge and Plymouth V8, except Hemi
- Borg-Warner T-56 (also known as Tremec T-56) — 6-speed longitudinal
  - 2004–2006 Dodge Ram SRT10
  - 1992–2002 Dodge Viper RT/10
  - 1996–2002 Dodge Viper GTS
  - 2003–2007 Dodge Viper SRT-10
- Fiat C510 — 5-speed transaxle
  - 2014–present Jeep Renegade (1.6L E.torQ)
- Fiat C635 — 6-speed transaxle
  - 2011–2020 Dodge Journey/Fiat Freemont (2.0L MultiJet)
  - 2013–2016 Dodge Dart (1.4L turbo)
  - 2014–present Jeep Renegade (1.4L turbo, 1.6L-2.0L MultiJet)
  - 2017–present Jeep Compass

Getrag 360 5 speed longitudinal 1989-1993 w/d 250 250 cummins diesel

- Getrag 238 — 6-speed longitudinal
  - 2005–2008 Dodge Ram
  - 2005–2009 Dodge Dakota
- Getrag 288 — 5-speed transaxle
  - 2003–2008 Chrysler PT Cruiser GT
- Getrag DMT6 — 6-speed transaxle
  - 2008–2009 Dodge Caliber SRT4
- Magna Driveline T355 — 5-speed transaxle
  - 2006–2011 Dodge Caliber
  - 2008–2010 Dodge Journey
  - 2006–2016 Jeep Compass
  - 2006–2017 Jeep Patriot
- Mercedes-Benz G56 — 6-speed longitudinal
  - 2005–present Dodge Ram 2500/3500/4500/5500
- Mitsubishi F5 — 5-speed transaxle
  - F5M22
    - 1989–1994 Plymouth Laser (1.8L - 2.0L n/a)
  - F5M33
    - 1991–1996 Dodge Stealth (3.0L V6 n/a)
    - 1989–1994 Plymouth Laser (2.0L turbo)
  - F5M42
    - 2000–2006 Dodge Stratus (2.4L - 2.7L)
  - F5M51
    - 2000–2006 Chrysler Sebring (3.0L V6)
    - 2001–2006 Dodge Stratus (3.0L V6)
- Peugeot BA10/5 - 5-speed longitudinal
  - 1987-mid-1989 Jeep Wrangler (YJ), Jeep Cherokee (XJ) and Jeep Comanche
- Tremec TR-6060 — 6-speed longitudinal
  - 2008–2010 Dodge Viper SRT-10
  - 2009–2023 Dodge Challenger
  - 2012–2017 SRT and Dodge Viper
- Volkswagen 020 — 4-speed transaxle adopted as Chrysler A412
  - 1978–1982 Dodge Omni 1.7L
  - 1978–1982 Plymouth Horizon 1.7L

=== Dual clutch ===
- Fiat C635 DDCT
  - 2013–2016 Dodge Dart (1.4L turbo)
  - 2014–present Jeep Renegade
- Fiat C725 DDCT
  - 2016–present Jeep Renegade (China)
  - 2017–present Jeep Compass (China)
- Getrag MPS6 (6DCT450)
  - 2009–2010 Chrysler Sebring (diesel engine)
  - 2009–2010 Dodge Avenger (diesel engine)
  - 2009–2010 Dodge Journey (diesel engine)

=== Continuously variable ===
- Jatco JF011E
  - 2007-2012 Dodge Caliber
  - 2006–2016 Jeep Compass
  - 2006–2017 Jeep Patriot

== See also ==
- List of AMC Transmission Applications (for list of transmission used in AMC vehicles before Chrysler buyout)
