= Hy-Drive =

Overview
- Manufacturer: Chrysler Corporation
- Production: 1953–1954

Body and chassis
- Class: 3-speed semi-automatic (manual with torque converter)

Chronology
- Predecessor: Presto-Matic
- Successor: PowerFlite

The Hy-Drive was a Chrysler Corporation semi-automatic transmission introduced in 1953 in US-market Plymouths. It was a hybrid manual transmission equipped with a torque converter, like an automatic. Although Hy-Drive cars had a clutch pedal like a traditional manual transmission, it was only used to put the car in gear. Once underway, the driver could upshift and downshift using the gear shift without using the clutch or even lifting off the accelerator.

The industry was caught by surprise by the advent of the automatic transmission in the early-to-late-1940s. General Motors' Dynaflow, introduced by Buick in 1948, was a smash hit with the public, very soon being fitted in over 80% of new Buicks. (GM's fully automatic Hydramatic, which debuted in 1939, was only used in Oldsmobile in 1940. Cadillac got it in 1941 and Pontiac got it in 1948.) Chrysler had previously offered a Fluid Drive fluid coupling (not a torque converter, as it did not multiply the torque) on their manual transmissions, and the Hy-Drive was an evolution of this. It was sold by Plymouth for the entire 1953 model year, and into April of the 1954 model year, when the fully automatic PowerFlite became available. About 75,000 cars came equipped with this transmission.

== Trivia ==
- The Hy-Drive was so large it required a complete reengineering of the engine compartment and transmission tunnel.
- Export Plymouth-based Dodges and DeSotos could be ordered with Hy-Drive.
- Hy-Drive transmissions shared the engine's lubricating oil, requiring 11 quarts (10.4 L) for an oil change.

== See also ==
- List of Chrysler transmissions
