= Presto-Matic =

Type of semi automatic gearbox made by the Chrysler Corporation from 1946 to 1953

M6

Overview
- Manufacturer: Chrysler Corporation
- Also called: Presto-Matic; Tip-Toe Shift; Gyro-Matic; Fluid-Matic; Fluidtorque; Gyrotorque; Fluid Drive
- Production: 1946–1953

Body and chassis
- Class: 2-speed semi-automatic transmission (manual with overdrive and torque converter)

Chronology
- Predecessor: M4 Vacamatic
- Successor: PowerFlite

The M6 Presto-Matic was a Chrysler Corporation semi-automatic transmission produced from 1946 to 1953. It was a special manual transmission with a fluid coupling. Although it had just two forward gears, an electric overdrive unit was attached and useful in either gear for a total of four forward speeds.

The driver would use the clutch pedal any time when selecting low, high, or reverse gear. Once underway, the accelerator could be eased and the car would engage the overdrive. With the Fluid Drive coupling, the car could be brought to a halt in gear without releasing the clutch and would creep like an automatic.

The "Presto-Matic" name was only used on Chrysler-brand cars. DeSoto called the transmission the Tip-Toe Shift, while Dodge used Gyro-Matic, Fluid-Matic, Fluidtorque, or Gyro-Torque. Chrysler and DeSoto sold the unit from 1946 to 1953, while Dodge did not introduce it until 1948. Plymouth introduced their Hy-Drive semi-automatic in 1953, but all were replaced by the PowerFlite hydraulic automatic in 1954.

== Operation ==
Attached to the transmission was an “underdrive” with a reduction gear of 1.75/1. The shift lever was column-mounted and had three positions: Low (in the “2nd” position of a conventional 3-speed manual unit), High (in the “3rd” position), and Reverse (same as the 3-speed). The clutch had to be depressed every time the gear shift lever was moved. When the lever was put in Low, the car started in “underdrive” low; when the vehicle reached a minimum speed of 6 mph (9.7 km/h), the driver lifted his foot off the accelerator, the underdrive unit would kick out and the car would be in Low. Similarly, with the lever in High position, the car would start in underdrive high, and at any speed above 13 mph (21 km/h), the driver would lift his foot and the car would “shift” into direct drive.

This configuration had the effect of providing 4 gear ratios:

- Underdrive Low, 3.57/1,
- Low 2.04/1,
- Underdrive High, 1.75/1,
- High, 1/1.

In order for the unit to work without gear clashing, it contained a freewheeling device (in Underdrive, Low and High), and the Owner's manual cautioned drivers not to use “1st or 3rd” gear when descending hills because there was no engine compression braking in those free-wheeling ranges. Generally, most drivers started an M6 car in High and accomplished the shift to direct drive somewhere between 13 and 25 MPH by releasing the accelerator pedal and waiting for the “clunk” that signaled the disengagement of the underdrive. An M6 car would automatically shift from High down to underdrive high when car speed dropped below approximately 11 MPH.

== See also ==
- Vacamatic
- List of Chrysler transmissions
