= TorqueFlite =

Automatic transmission made by Chrysler

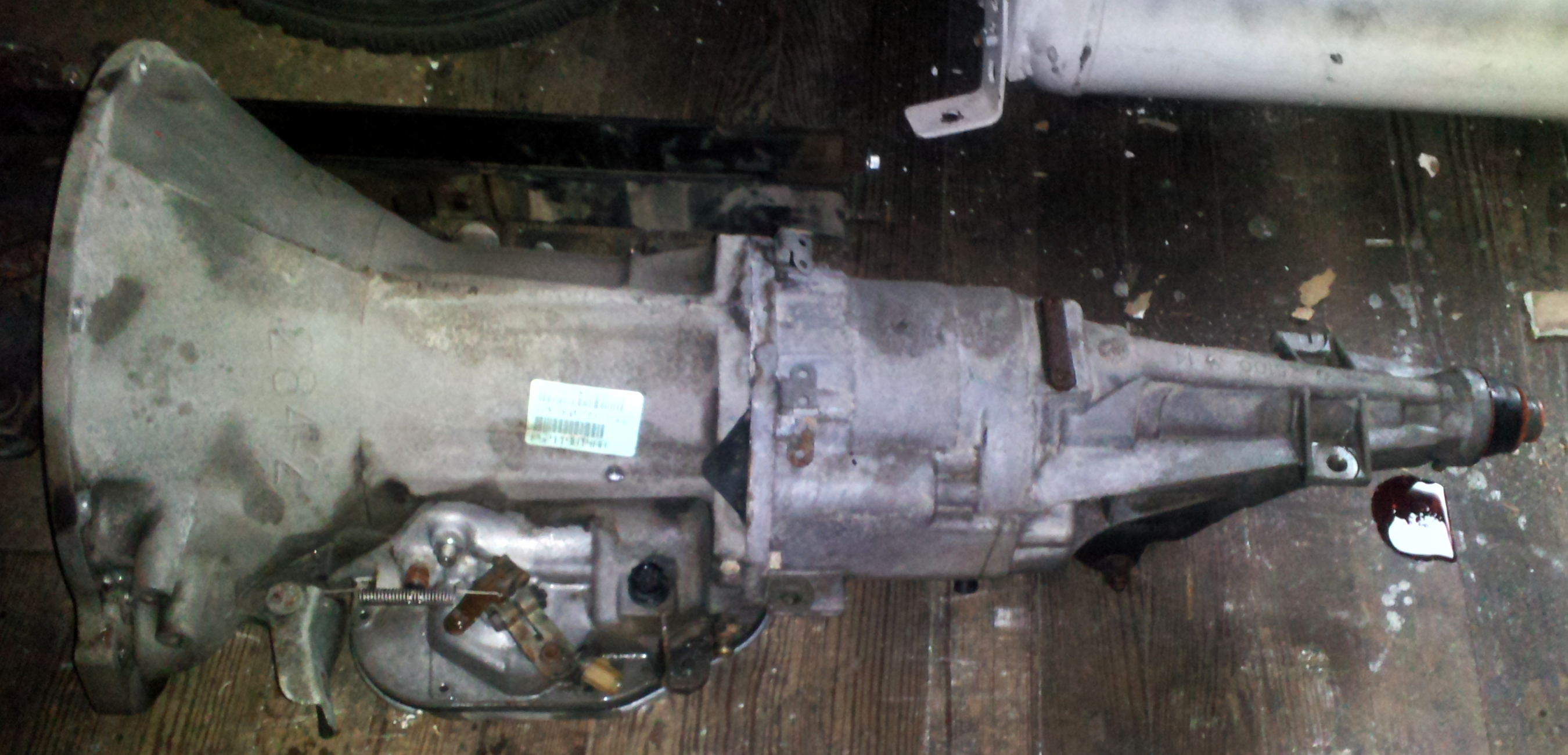
- Torqueflite 42RE

Overview
- Manufacturer: Chrysler Corporation
- Also called: Torqueflite; TorqueCommand (AMC); LoadFlite (Trucks)
- Production: 1956–present

Body and chassis
- Class: 3- or 4-speed automatic transmissions or 8-speed automatic

Chronology
- Predecessor: Chrysler PowerFlite transmission
- Successor: Chrysler RFE transmission

TorqueFlite (also seen as Torqueflite) is the trademarked name of Chrysler Corporation's automatic transmissions, starting with the three-speed unit introduced late in the 1956 model year as a successor to Chrysler's two-speed PowerFlite. In the 1990s, the TorqueFlite name was replaced with alphanumeric designations, although the latest Chrysler eight-speed automatic transmission has revived the name.

== History ==
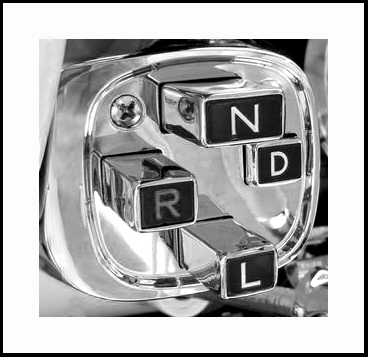
Imperial dash push-button "Powerflite" transmission introduced for the 1956 models

Torqueflite transmissions use torque converters and Simpson gearsets, two identical planetary gearsets sharing a standard sun gear. Chrysler Corporation licensed this gear set from Howard Simpson in 1955.

The first Torqueflites offered three forward speeds plus reverse. Gear ratios were 2.45:1 in first, 1.45 in second, 1.00 in third, and 2.20 in reverse.

The transmission was controlled by a series of push buttons on the vehicle's dashboard. The buttons were generally located at the extreme driver's side end of the dash, i.e., on the left in left-hand drive vehicles and on the right in right-hand drive ones. Exceptions included the 1962 Dodge Phoenix, a right-hand drive export model sold in Australia and South Africa, which used the standard 1962 U.S. Plymouth Valiant model year instrument cluster assembly, with the transmission push-buttons integrated on the left side.

The button arrangement varied by vehicle model and year; the sequence was reverse, neutral, drive, second, and first, arranged top to bottom with vertically aligned buttons, from left to right with horizontally aligned buttons, and clockwise, starting at the upper left with clustered buttons. The neutral button had to be engaged before starting the engine. In some applications, the button also activated the starter.

A parking lock was not provided until the advent of the aluminum-case Torqueflites in 1960 (standard-duty A-904) and 1962 (heavy-duty A-727), at which point a lever was added adjacent to the push-buttons: Moving the lever to the "park" position placed the car into neutral and engaged a lock pawl on the transmission's output shaft. Moving the parking lever from the "park" position unlocked the shift buttons to select a driving range. The buttons were replaced by conventional steering column- or floor-mounted shift levers in all automatic Chrysler-built vehicles for the 1965 model year. Floor shift levers were available in some 1964 models. The levers always used the P-R-N-D-2-1 sequence.

Like the operation of General Motors' Hydramatic transmissions, Torqueflites start in first gear when the drive or second position is selected. This contrasts with vehicles equipped with automatic transmissions from Ford and Borg-Warner, which begin in second rather than first if the second position is selected.

For 1962, a canister-style fluid filter was installed in the cooler line. For 1964, the canister filter was eliminated, and an efficient Dacron filter replaced the transmission's internal intake screen. Fluid life starting in 1964 was extended from 12,000 mi (19,000 km) to 50,000 mi (80,000 km), justifying the deletion of the drain plug from the oil pan.

For 1966, the twin-cable shift and park control mechanism (a holdover from the push-button operation) was replaced by a solid shift control linkage consisting of a series of pushrods, rotating rods, and levers. The rear pump was eliminated, which simplified and reduced the cost of the transmission but rendered push-starting impossible. Chrysler engineers reasoned that improved electrical and fuel systems reduced the need for push-starting vehicles, and safety concerns outweighed the benefits of doing so. The gated shift quadrants also permitted the deletion of the reverse safety blocker valve, which, in TorqueFlites made through 1965, had shifted the transmission harmlessly into neutral if the driver selected the reverse position while the vehicle was moving forward at speeds above approximately 3 mph (4.8 km/h). With the elimination of the rear pump, the oil filter was designed with a single oil port.

In 1968, part-throttle downshift functionality was added to A-904 transmissions used with six-cylinder engines. This feature permitted the transmission to shift from third to second gear in response to moderate accelerator pressure. Previously, an automatic 3-2 downshift occurred only if the driver pressed the accelerator to the floor. This change was made to maintain acceptable in-town performance with taller final-drive ratios in the rear axle — 2.76:1 rear axle gears were being furnished in applications previously equipped with 2.93:1 or 3.23:1 gearsets. Part-throttle downshift functionality was extended to V8 A-904s in 1969 and to most A-727 transmissions in 1970 and 1971.

Starting in 1978, most Torqueflite transmissions were equipped with a lockup torque converter clutch, which mechanically connected the converter's impeller and turbine, thereby eliminating slip and improving highway fuel economy. This addition required the removal of the torque converter drain plug.

For 1980, a wide-ratio gearset was introduced for the A904, A998, and A999, featuring a 2.74:1 ratio in first gear, 1.54 in second gear, and 1.00 in third gear.

Since 1962, a version of the Torqueflite was an available option or standard equipment, depending on model and year, on rear-wheel-drive Chrysler products: Plymouth, Dodge, DeSoto, Chrysler, and Imperial. When installed in light-duty Dodge trucks and vans, the transmission was marketed as LoadFlite.

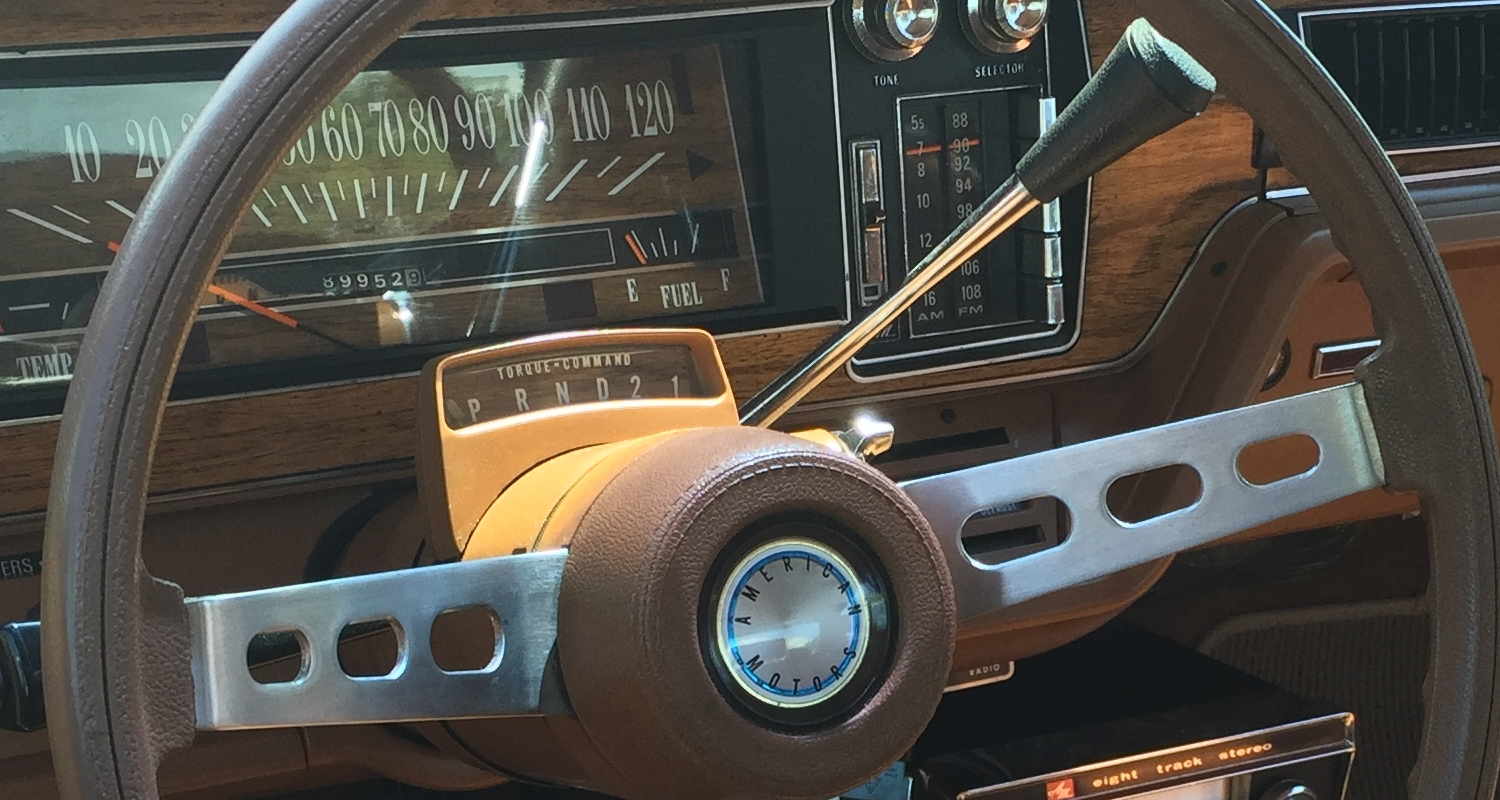
Steering column-mounted Torque-Command gear selector

The Torqueflite replaced Borg-Warner automatics in American Motors Corporation (AMC) cars beginning with the 1972 model year, and AMC marketed them as Torque-Command. After 1979, AMC discontinued offering the Hydramatic in Jeeps to join the rest of AMC's models.

Other automakers using the Torqueflite included International Harvester, Maserati Quattroporte, Monteverdi (automobile), and Bristol, as well as several brands of light and medium-duty trucks and panel vans.

In the 1990s, the transmissions were renamed. However, the original Torqueflite design remained the basis of many Chrysler-designed and built transmissions through 2007 (and FWD transaxles through 2000).

== Nomenclature ==
Torqueflite transmissions and transaxles made through 1991 were assigned arbitrary engineering designations consisting of the letter "A" followed by three digits. The 1992 and later units have four-character designations in which the first through fourth characters indicate, respectively, the number of forward speeds, torque capacity, drive type or transaxle orientation, and control system:

Forward speeds	Torque capacity	Drive type	Control
3 or 4	0 (low) to 9 (high)	R (Rear wheel); T (Transverse); A (All-wheel)	H (Hydromechanical); E (Electronic)

== Rear-wheel drive transmissions ==
=== A466 ===
The original TorqueFlite was designated A466, with a cast iron case, separate iron converter housing, and no parking pawl.

=== A727 (36RH/37RH) ===
The A466 was replaced in 1962 with the A727 (later renamed 36RH and 37RH), with a one-piece aluminum case to reduce weight by about 60 lb (27 kg). This was initially referred to in consumer-oriented publications as the "TorqueFlite 8" to differentiate it from the A904. The A727 incorporated a parking pawl, with the sole exception being that for 1962 the Chrysler, Imperial, and Dodge 880 (based on a Chrysler Newport) A727s had an extension-mounted drum parking brake instead of a parking pawl. Compared to the early cast-iron transmissions, many and various internal improvements were featured, and it used a 10.75 in (27.3 cm) or 11.75 in (29.8 cm) torque converter. The heavier-duty A727 Torqueflites became — and remain — wildly popular for drag racing, off roading, and monster truck applications because of their controllability, reliability, ease/cheapness of repair, and brute strength. There are unique bellhousing bolt patterns for the small block "A" and big block "B" engine versions of this transmission and for American Motors (AMC) and Jeep applications.

- 1962–1978 361, 383, 400 B-Motor V8
- 1962–1978 413, 426 Wedge, 440 RB-V8
- 1966–1971 426 "Street" Hemi
- 1964–1971 426 Race Hemi (super stock, etc.)
- 1962–1966 318 "A" "Poly" V8
- 1968–1973 340 (all)
- 1969–1983 225 (Police, Taxi)
- 1971–1980 360 (4-BBl only)
- 1978–1983 318 (4-bbl Police)
- 1972–1978 AMC "Torque-Command"
- 1984–1989 318 (2-bbl Taxi special order)
- 1980–1991 Jeep (some)

Gear ratios:

1	2	3	R
2.45	1.45	1.00	2.20

==== A518 (46RH/46RE) ====
The A518, later renamed 46RH (hydraulic controlled governor pressure) and 46RE (electronic controlled governor pressure), is an A727 derivative with overdrive, in the A500 ilk. Starting in 1990, it was used in some trucks and vans. The overdrive fourth gear ratio is 0.69:1.

Gear ratios:

1	2	3	4	R
2.45	1.45	1.00	0.69	2.35

Applications:

- Dodge Ram pickup and vans 150/250/350 V8 and diesel engines (DGT)
- Dodge Ramcharger SUV 1988–1993 5.2L & 5.9L V8
- Jeep Grand Cherokee 1993 5.2L, 1998 5.9L
- 1995 Dodge Dakota 5.2L Magnum V8
- 1996 Dodge Dakota V8
- 1998–2003 Dodge Dakota R/T
- 1998–2003 Dodge Durango 5.9L V8 (4WD or 2WD)
- 1994–1995 Dodge Ram 1500/2500/3500 V8
- 1996–2001 Dodge Ram 1500 V8
- 1996–2002 Dodge Ram 2500/3500 V8
- 2002-early 2003 Dodge Ram 1500 5.9L V8
- X-1995 Dodge Ram Van 2500 5.2L Magnum V8

==== A618 (47RH/47RE/48RE) ====
The A618, later renamed 47RE (electronically controlled governor pressure) is a heavier-duty version of A518, also known as the 46RE (which also has electronically controlled governor pressure, versus the earlier RH version, which was hydraulically controlled). It was used in trucks and vans starting in the mid-1990s. While currently used with some internal changes such as the move from aluminum to steel planetary carriers and an increase in the number of clutch plates when coupled to the 5.9 L Cummins Turbo-Diesel and the 8.0 L V-10 applications, it is a 727 with overdrive and more robust internal parts. It has an input torque rating of 450 lb⋅ft (610 N⋅m). The 48RE is an electronically governed, ECU-controlled, four-speed heavy-duty overdrive automatic transmission, that is stronger than its predecessor, the 47-series. The 48RE was introduced in 2004 to 3rd gen ram pickups with the 5.9 cummins, or the v10, some 2003 and early '04 trucks still were equipped with 47RE units, and then came a 48RE which still used a TV cable, and then from 2004.5 to '07 the 48RE was fitted with a TTVA motor (transmission throttle valve actuator) which eliminated the need for a mechanical TV cable. 48RE units had the highest volume pump out of any of its predecessors, using a 10 lobe design with tighter clearances (.003"-.005") versus the 47RE's 11 lobe design for additional holding ability. More volume was on tap to be circulated through the larger cooling circuit. With the higher than ever low end Cummins torque, the direct drum was bigger to allow 5 .085" frictions and 5 .084" steels, the forward drum is in fact made bigger (deeper) to make room for the 5th direct friction/steel, the 48's forward clutch frictions switched from a 64 tooth to a 93 tooth inner spline count, 6 pinion steel planets were introduced with more robust thrust washers backing them, and the overdrive housing was slightly enlarged in the parking mechanism areas to allow the bigger parking rod and pawl mechanism. Most importantly, the valvebody introduced the ability to have 2nd gear TCC lockup in manual second. Along with a handful of other enhancements, part throttle 3rd gear TCC lockup was a big quality of life enhancement.

The base design from the original Torqueflite remains essentially unchanged. The addition of a two-speed output shaft (overdrive unit) that is bolted to the back of the three-speed transmission has only two ratios: direct (1:1) and overdrive (.69:1). While lubrication to the overdrive unit was a challenge early on, this was overcome with factory improvements or aftermarket valve body kits. The overdrive planetary has six-pinion gears (unlike the five-pinion used with the A518 used with the Cummins turbodiesel), which is often used as an aftermarket replacement for the stock four-pinion planetary used with the lighter duty transmissions.

Gear ratios:

1	2	3	4	R
2.45	1.45	1.00	0.69	2.21

Applications:

- Dodge Ram pickups 2500/3500 ISB Diesel and iron V-10 (DGP)
- Dodge Ram SRT-10 (DGP)
- 1994–1995 Dodge Ram 2500/3500 Diesel/V10
- 1996–2002 (Also some early production 2003's) Dodge Ram 2500/3500 Diesel/V10
- 1998–2000 Aston Martin Virage V8 5.3L
- 2003–2004 Dodge Ram 2500/3500 ISB Diesel
- 2003–2004 Dodge Ram 2500/3500 HO ISB Diesel
- 2004–2007 Dodge Ram 2500/3500 600/610 Diesel
- 2004–2006 Dodge Ram SRT-10

=== A904 (30RH) ===
For standard-duty applications in smaller and lighter vehicles with six-cylinder or small V8 engines starting with the 1964-1/2 273, the compact A904 (later 30RH) was introduced in 1960. This transmission used a 10.75 in (27.3 cm) torque converter. A smaller version of this transmission was also used in the Dodge Colt/Plymouth Champ cars made by Mitsubishi in Japan. This smaller transmission used a 10 in (25 cm) torque converter.

There are unique bellhousing bolt patterns for the Chrysler Slant-Six, small block V8, and AMC versions (both the six and V8s), including the Chevrolet V8 bellhousing pattern when used with the GM Iron Duke, which was the base engine in some 1980–1983 AMC and Jeep products (this bellhousing pattern is not commonly found since transmission cores are usually sought after for drag racing in building a Powerglide or TH200 derivative using THM2004R internals inclusive of a modified torque converter front face and/or torque converter adapter ring allowing the use of the TorqueFlite bolt pattern to a GM flexplate), and a GM 60 Degree V6 bolt pattern when used with the GM 2.8 L LR2 of this transmission.

Uses:

- 1960–1976 170, 198, 225 slant-six
- 1964–1969 273 LA V8
- 1967–1978 318 LA V8
- 1972–1977 AMC Hornet
- 1972–1978 AMC Gremlin, AMC Matador with six-cylinder engines
- 1975–1980 AMC Pacer
- 1978–1983 AMC Concord
- 1979–1983 AMC Spirit
- 1980–1983 Jeep CJ, AMC Eagle with GM Iron Duke engine
- 1983–1984 Jeep DJ-5M with AMC 2.5 L
- 1984–1986, 1994–2000 Jeep Cherokee (XJ) with GM 2.8 L LR2 V6, AMC 2.5 L I4
- 1986 Jeep Comanche (MJ) with GM 2.8 L V6, AMC 2.5 L I4
- 1994–1995 Jeep Wrangler (YJ) with four-cylinder engine
- 1997–2002 Jeep Wrangler (TJ) with four-cylinder engine

==== A998 (31RH) ====
The A998, later renamed 31RH was a medium-duty, narrow or wide-ratio version of the small-frame A904 transmission for use with medium-power V8 engines and the 3.9 L V6 engine. It was equipped with four direct friction plates. This transmission differed from the A904 by having a reinforced case and internals. Narrow ratios are 2.45/1.45/1.00:,1 and wide ratios are 2.74/1.55/1.00:1.

Uses:

- 1984–1989 318 (2-bbl)
- 1972–1988 AMC 6-cylinder and 304 cu in (5.0 L) V8 engines
- 1987–1988 Dodge Dakota

==== A999 (32RH) ====
The A999 (later renamed 32RH) was a heavier-duty, wide-ratio version of the small-frame A904 transmission for use with medium-power V8 engines and the 3.9 L V6 engine. It was equipped with five direct friction plates. These automatics had lower first- and second-gear ratios, allowing the lower-powered engines to provide better acceleration without sacrificing highway fuel economy. They were frequently used today in drag racing.

Uses:

- 1975–1980 360 (2-bbl)
- 1984–1989 318 (4-bbl Police)
- 1994–2003 Dodge Ram Van B150 with Magnum 3.9L V6 engine
- 1994–2003 Dodge Dakota with Magnum 3.9 L V6 engine
- 1987–1995 Jeep Wrangler YJ with 6-cylinder engine.
- 1997–2002 Jeep Wrangler TJ with 6-cylinder engine.
- Jeep Wagoneer/Grand Wagoneer with the 258 cu in (4.2 L) straight-6

==== A500 (40RH/42RH/40RE/42RE/44RE) ====
The A500, later renamed 40RH and 42RH (hydraulically controlled governor pressure) and 40RE, 42RE, 44RE (electronically controlled governor pressure, 1993-up), was an A904 derivative used in trucks and vans. Introduced in the 1988 model year on a limited basis, it was the first light-duty Chrysler four-speed automatic and was placed behind the 3.9 L and 5.2 L engines for light-duty purposes. Forward direct clutch drum (same as the A998) usually has a four friction disc pack – an A999 forward direct clutch drum with the five friction disc pack does interchange. A bolt-in low/reverse overrun clutch assembly (shared with the A904 derivatives manufactured after 1988) uses a roller clutch, which is shared with the GM THM200 and THM2004R. Much like the later production A904 with a wide ratio gear, a double wrap low-reverse band is used. An extension housing mounted (New Process built) overdrive unit was bolted to the rear of the case to provide a total of four forward speeds; the extension housing and its internals interchange with the 46-48RH/RE (A518/618) – when overhauling the overdrive unit transmission rebuilders usually would use replacement parts from the A518/618 overdrive section since the A500 internals are light duty e.g. number of friction discs and thick pressure plates.

The overdrive housing (RWD/2WD) uses an output shaft yoke commonly shared with the A727 and its later derivatives, except for the A618/48RE. Electronic governor pressure was phased in during the middle of the 1993 model year, where it was renamed as the A500SE – Jeep Grand Cherokees equipped with the 4.0L used the A500SE/42RE since the middle of the 1993 model year replacing the AW4. Oil pans used with the A500SE/42RE are similar in design to the one used in the A500, with a clearance area for the shift solenoid. The pan and filter were updated during the 1998 model year with some Dodge applications, which have a deeper oil pan and a redesigned oil filter that is held with two valve body screws (the single oil port filter does interchange with the older A500 and A904 derivatives along with the oil pan). This transmission was replaced by the 42RLE in 2004.

Gear ratios:

1	2	3	4	R
2.74	1.54	1.00	0.69	2.21

Applications:

- 1989–2001 Dodge Ram pickup 150/1500 V6/V8(2WD)
- 1989–2003 Dodge Ram Van B150/B250/B350 V6/V8
- 1989–2003 Dodge Dakota
- 1993–2004 Jeep Grand Cherokee I6
- 1996–1998 Jeep Grand Cherokee 5.2 V8
- 1999–2003 Jeep Grand Cherokee 3.1 TD
- 1998–2000 Dodge Durango 5.2L V8 (4WD (98–99) or 2WD (99–00))

== Front-wheel drive transaxles ==
The A404, A413, A470, and A670 are front wheel drive transaxle derivatives of the A904 Torqueflite.

In the late 1970s, Chrysler designed the A404 TorqueFlite three-speed automatic transaxle for its front-wheel drive Dodge Omni and Plymouth Horizon subcompact cars. This transaxle would be upgraded in the 1980s into the A413 and A670 units, which were progressively heavier-duty, for Chrysler's K-cars and their derivatives, including the minivans. The four-speed Ultradrive electronic four-speed automatic transaxle would eventually replace it. Still, the three-speed lasted for more than a decade after the 1989 debut of the four-speed unit.

=== A404 ===
The light-duty A404 was used with the smallest straight-4 engines from Chrysler, commonly the 1.7 L Volkswagen unit.

=== A413 or 31TH ===
The A404 was strengthened to become the A413 (later 31TH) in 1981. This was used with Chrysler's 2.2 and 2.5 L K-car engines. It was available both with and without a lockup torque converter.

Applications:

- 1995–2001 Dodge/Plymouth/Chrysler Neon
- 1982–1995 Chrysler LeBaron
- 1987–1994 Dodge Shadow/Plymouth Sundance/Chrysler
- 1978–1990 Dodge Omni/Plymouth Horizon
- 1981–1989 Plymouth Reliant/Dodge Aries
- 1989–1995 Dodge Spirit/Plymouth Acclaim
- 1983–1988 Plymouth Caravelle
- 1983–1984 Chrysler E-Class
- 1983–1988 Dodge 600/Chrysler New Yorker
- 1982–1983 Dodge 400
- 1988–1993 Dodge Dynasty
- 1983–1987 Dodge Charger
- 1983–1986 Chrysler Executive
- 1984–2007 Dodge Caravan/Grand Caravan/Plymouth Voyager/Grand Voyager
- 1985–1989 Dodge Lancer
- 1989–1991 Chrysler TC by Maserati

=== A415 ===
The A415 was developed for the 1.6 L Simca 1100 engine, but was not released for series production in the U.S. It was used in Europe, in the Talbot Simca, 1510, and Solara.

=== A470 ===
The A470 was a strengthened version of the transaxle used with the 2.6 L Mitsubishi Astron engine in the K-cars from 1981 until 1985, and minivans from 1984 through 1987.

=== A670 ===
The highest-specification three-speed transaxle was the A670. It was used with the 3.0 L Mitsubishi V6 engine in Chrysler's cars and minivans from 1987 to 2000.

Gear ratios:

1	2	3	R	Final
2.69	1.55	1.00	2.10	3.02

== See also ==
- List of Chrysler transmissions
- AMC/Jeep Transmissions
- Pan Shapes and Naming
