= Chrysler PowerFlite transmission =

Two speed automatic transmission from Chrysler Corporation

PowerFlite
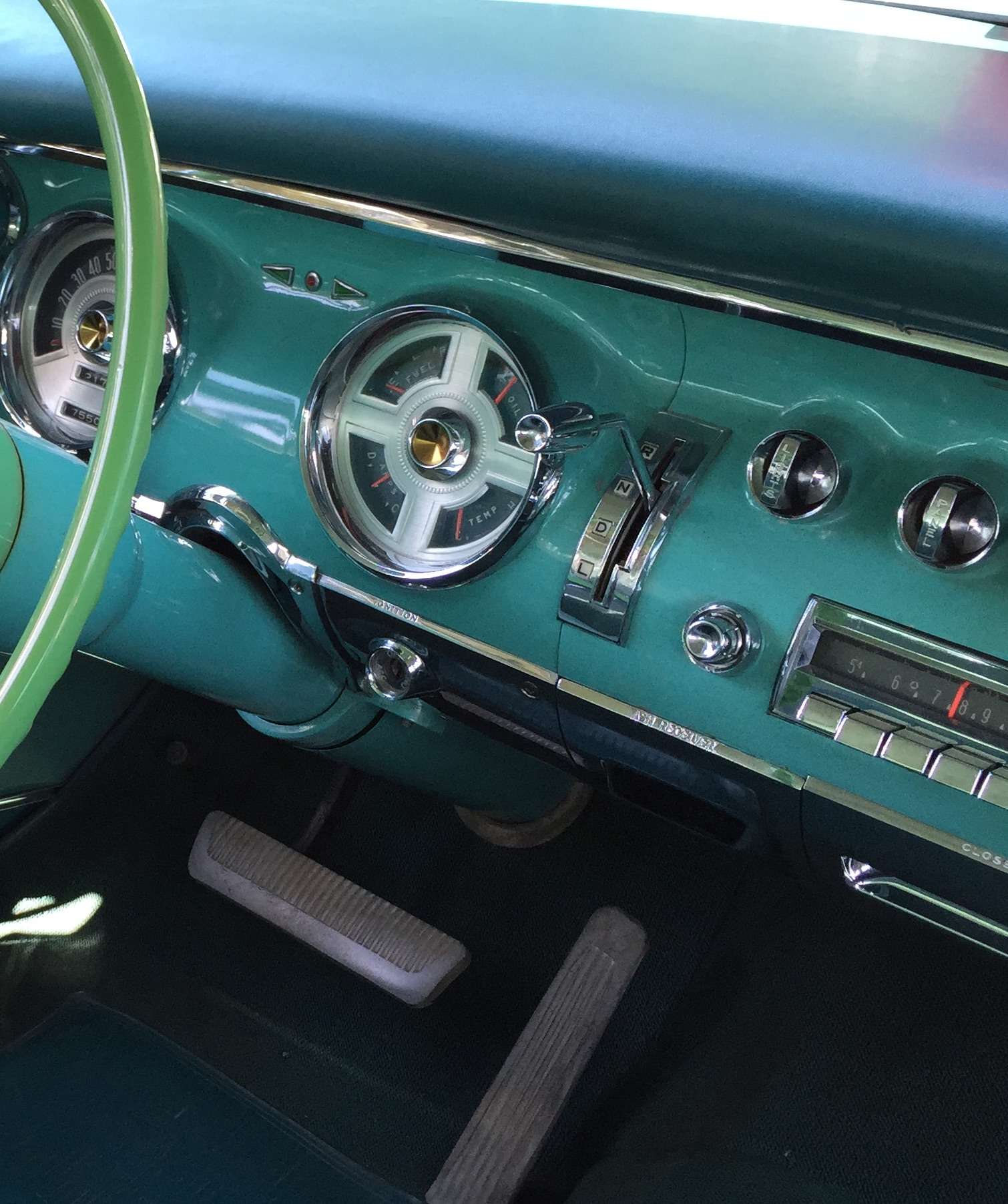
- Selector mounted on the dashboard of a 1955 Chrysler New Yorker

Overview
- Manufacturer: Chrysler Corporation
- Production: 1954-1961

Body and chassis
- Class: 2-speed automatic

Chronology
- Predecessor: M6 Presto-Matic; Hy-Drive
- Successor: Chrysler TorqueFlite transmission

PowerFlite is a two-speed automatic transmission engineered and produced by the Chrysler Corporation and used in their passenger cars from 1954 to 1961. Production began in late 1953 and the simple and durable PowerFlite remained available on Plymouths and Dodges through the 1961 model year.

== Background ==
Chrysler was the last of Detroit's Big Three automakers to introduce a fully automatic transmission, some 14 years after General Motors had introduced Oldsmobile's Hydramatic automatic transmission and nearly three years after Ford's Ford-O-Matic. Packard's Ultramatic debuted in 1949, and Studebaker's Automatic Drive was introduced in 1950.

The PowerFlite was lighter and simple in its construction and operation, with fewer parts than competing transmissions. It was also durable, being used behind every Chrysler Corporation engine from the Plymouth Six to the Imperial's Hemi V8. Chrysler introduced a three-speed TorqueFlite automatic in 1956, but the two-speed PowerFlite remained available on some models through 1961.

== Shift sequence ==
Upon its introduction, the PowerFlite was controlled by a single lever mounted on the steering column. The shift quadrant sequence was R-N-D-L, which differed from the more common P-N-D-L-R on other makes. In those cars, it was necessary to pass through all forward ranges to put the car in reverse gear, and then back through some of those ranges to drive forward. Chrysler promoted the greater safety of the PowerFlite pattern; because forward and reverse settings were separated by neutral and it was necessary to move the lever only one notch to the left or right to put the car in motion, so an accidental over shift past D would result in a harmless shift to low gear rather than an unintended engagement of reverse.

In 1955, Chrysler moved the shift lever to the dashboard in a vertical slot with "R" at the top and "L" at the bottom.

In 1956, Chrysler switched to pushbutton transmission controls, which remained the only PowerFlite shift mechanism.

Many years later, when the U.S. National Highway Traffic Safety Administration began regulating vehicle controls and displays, the Chrysler pattern (with the Park setting added, becoming P-R-N-D-L), became mandatory for safety reasons originally stated by Chrysler.

Unlike most other automatic transmissions, the PowerFlite, Chrysler's 2-speed automatic transmission, did not feature a "Park" range, making it necessary to use the handbrake whenever the car was parked. All Chrysler products at the time had a parking brake independent from the vehicle's wheel brakes, a single brake drum mounted on the driveshaft, just behind the transmission. This had the (intended) effect of locking both rear wheels in the same way that the "Park" setting did in other transmissions.

== Soviet applications ==
The PowerFlite was reverse-engineered and copied by Soviet engineers from the ZiL plant. They utilized and fitted this transmission in the ZIL-111 limousine, used by members of the Soviet politburo.
