= Fluid Drive =

Chrysler transmission driveline of the 1940s

Fluid Drive is the trademarked name that Chrysler Corporation assigned to a transmission driveline combination which replaced the flywheel with a hydraulic coupling and performed the same function as a modern torque converter, only without torque multiplication. The fluid coupling and torque converter was invented by the German engineer Hermann Föttinger in the early 1900s.

== Configuration ==
The standard Fluid Drive configuration consisted of the fluid coupling and a manual transmission and clutch in tandem. If the Fluid Drive was mated to a manual transmission, the driver still needed to use the clutch to shift between any of the gears. The presence of Fluid Drive, however, prevented the driver stalling when taking off from a stop. The driver could also come to a stop in any gear without using the clutch and could then proceed without shifting or using the clutch.

Fluid Drive could also be mated to a semi-automatic transmission. With the semi-automatic transmission, the driver selected reverse, low range, or high range. Each range had two speeds; to shift between them, the driver accelerated then released pressure on the accelerator.

== See also ==
- List of Chrysler transmissions
